= French colonial empire =

Overseas territories controlled by France (1534–1980)

French colonial empire Empire colonial français
- 1534–1980
- Royal Standard of France (before 1792) Flag of the French Empire and the French Republic Flag

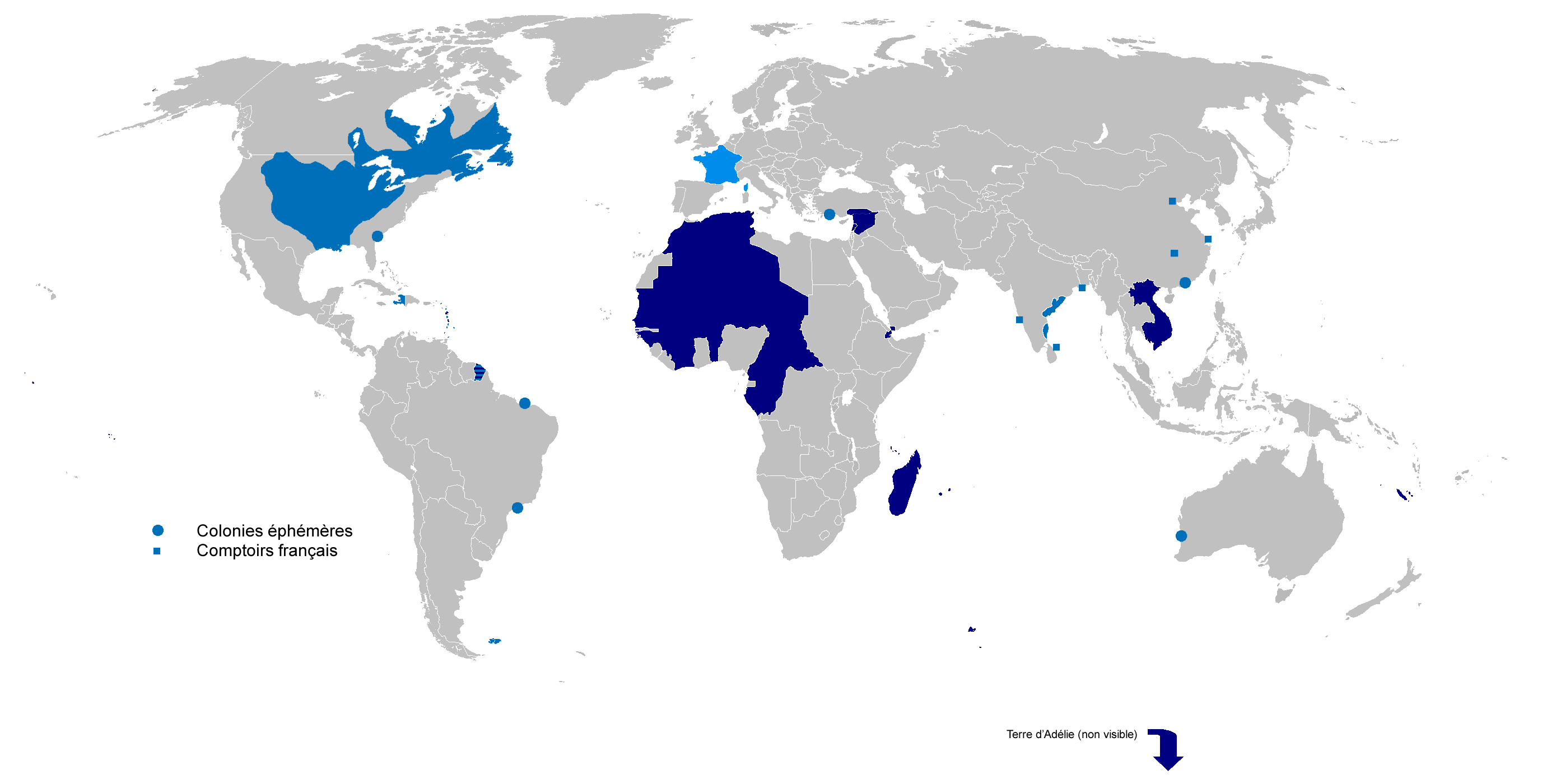
- French colonial empires: First Second
- Status: Colonial empire
- Capital: Paris
- History
  - Cartier claimed Gaspé Bay: 1534
  - Sale of Louisiana: 1803
  - Conquest of Algeria: 1830–1903
  - Creation of the French Union: 1946
  - Independence of Vanuatu: 1980
- Currency: French franc and various other currencies
- ISO 3166 code: FR
Succeeded by
French Union

The French colonial empire (French: Empire colonial français) consisted of the overseas colonies, protectorates, and mandate territories that came under French rule from the 16th century onward. A distinction is generally made between the "first French colonial empire", that existed until 1814, by which time most of it had been lost or sold, and the "second French colonial empire", which began with the conquest of Algiers in 1830. On the eve of World War I, France's colonial empire was the second-largest in the world after the British Empire.

France began to establish colonies in the Americas, the Caribbean, and India in the 16th century but lost most of its possessions after its defeat in the Seven Years' War. The North American possessions were lost to Britain and Spain, but Spain later returned Louisiana to France in 1800. The territory was then sold to the United States in 1803. France rebuilt a new empire mostly after 1850, concentrating chiefly in Africa as well as Indochina and the South Pacific. As it developed, the new French empire took on roles of trade with the metropole, supplying raw materials and purchasing manufactured items. Especially after the disastrous Franco-Prussian War, which saw Germany become the leading economic and military power of the continent of Europe, acquiring colonies and rebuilding an empire was seen as a way to restore French prestige in the world. It was also to provide manpower during the world wars.

The ideological foundation of French colonialism was the Mission civilisatrice, or "civilizing mission", which aimed to spread French language, institutions, and values. Promoted by figures like Jules Ferry, who spoke of a "duty to civilize", this vision framed colonialism as a universalist and progressive project. It was nonetheless contested, including by prominent politicians such as Georges Leygues, who rejected the policy of assimilation: "when faced with Muslim, Hindu, Annamite populations, all with a long history of brilliant civilizations, the policy of assimilation would be the most disastrous and absurd."

In practice, colonial subjects were governed under unequal legal systems and only rarely granted full citizenship, despite the universalist principles of the French Republic. While the French empire sometimes provided greater access to citizenship or education than other colonial powers, efforts to extend republican institution, such as the possibility of naturalization for Algerian Muslims, largely failed, facing both internal divisions and widespread refusal by colonized populations to fully submit to the laws of the French Republic.

In World War II, Charles de Gaulle and the Free French used the colonies as a base from which they prepared to liberate France. Historian Tony Chafer argues that: "In an effort to restore its world-power status after the humiliation of defeat and occupation, France was eager to maintain its overseas empire at the end of the Second World War." However, after 1945, anti-colonial movements began to challenge European authority. Revolts in Indochina and Algeria proved costly and France lost both colonies. After these conflicts, a relatively peaceful decolonization took place elsewhere after 1960. The French Constitution of 27 October 1946 (Fourth French Republic) established the French Union, which endured until 1958. Newer remnants of the colonial empire were integrated into France as overseas departments and territories within the French Republic. These now total altogether 119,394 km^{2} (46,098 sq. miles), with 2.8 million people in 2021. Links between France and its former colonies persist through La francophonie, the CFA franc, and joint military operations such as Operation Serval.

France sent few settlers to most colonies, with the notable exception of Algeria, where Europeans, though a minority, held political and economic dominance. The empire generated both collaboration and resistance, and many future anti-colonial leaders were educated in France, drawing on its republican ideals to challenge colonial rule.

== First French colonial empire (16th century to 1814) ==
=== The Americas ===
The French colonial empire in the Americas comprised New France (including Canada and Louisiana), French West Indies (including Saint-Domingue, Guadeloupe, Martinique, Dominica, St. Lucia, Grenada, Tobago and other islands) and French Guiana.

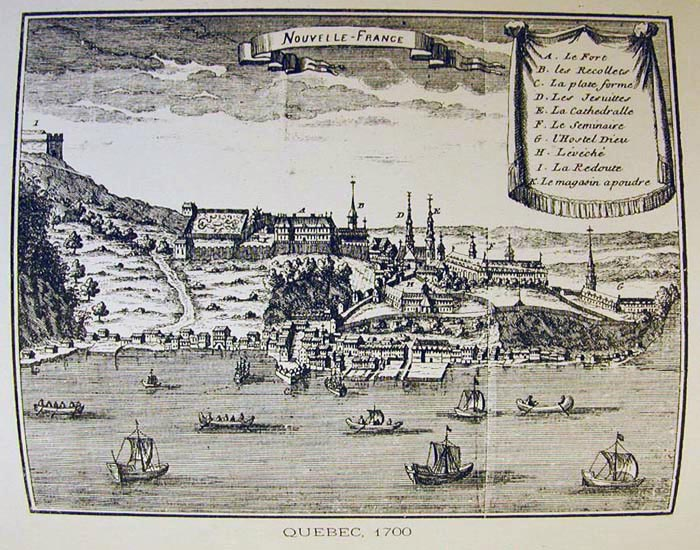
French North America was known as Nouvelle France or New France.

During the 16th century, the French colonization of the Americas began. Excursions of Giovanni da Verrazzano and Jacques Cartier in the early 16th century, as well as the frequent voyages of French boats and fishermen to the Grand Banks of Newfoundland throughout that century, were the precursors to the story of France's colonial expansion. But Spain's defense of its American monopoly, and the further distractions caused in France itself in the later 16th century by the French Wars of Religion, prevented any constant efforts by France to settle colonies. Early French attempts to found colonies in Brazil, in 1555 at Rio de Janeiro ("France Antarctique") and in Florida (including Fort Caroline in 1562), and in 1612 at São Luís ("France Équinoxiale"), were not successful, due to a lack of official interest and to Portuguese and Spanish vigilance.

The story of France's colonial empire truly began on 27 July 1605, with the foundation of Port Royal in the colony of Acadia in North America, in what is now Nova Scotia, Canada. A few years later, in 1608, Samuel de Champlain founded Quebec, which was to become the capital of the enormous, but sparsely settled, fur-trading colony of New France (also called Canada).

New France had a rather small population, which resulted from more emphasis being placed on the fur trade rather than agricultural settlements. Due to this emphasis, the French relied heavily on creating friendly contacts with the local First Nations community. Without the appetite of New England for land, and by relying solely on Aboriginals to supply them with fur at the trading posts, the French composed a complex series of military, commercial, and diplomatic connections. These became the most enduring alliances between the French and the First Nation community. The French were, however, under pressure from religious orders to convert them to Catholicism.

Through alliances with various Native American tribes, the French were able to exert a loose control over much of the North American continent. Areas of French settlement were generally limited to the St. Lawrence River Valley. Prior to the establishment of the 1663 Sovereign Council, the territories of New France were developed as mercantile colonies. It is only after the arrival of intendant Jean Talon in 1665 that France gave its American colonies the proper means to develop population colonies comparable to that of the British. Acadia itself was lost to the British in the Treaty of Utrecht in 1713. Back in France, there was relatively little interest in colonialism, which concentrated rather on dominance within Europe, and for most of its history, New France was far behind the British North American colonies in both population and economic development.

In 1699, French territorial claims in North America expanded still further, with the foundation of Louisiana in the basin of the Mississippi River. The extensive trading network throughout the region connected to Canada through the Great Lakes, was maintained through a vast system of fortifications, many of them centred in the Illinois Country and in present-day Arkansas.

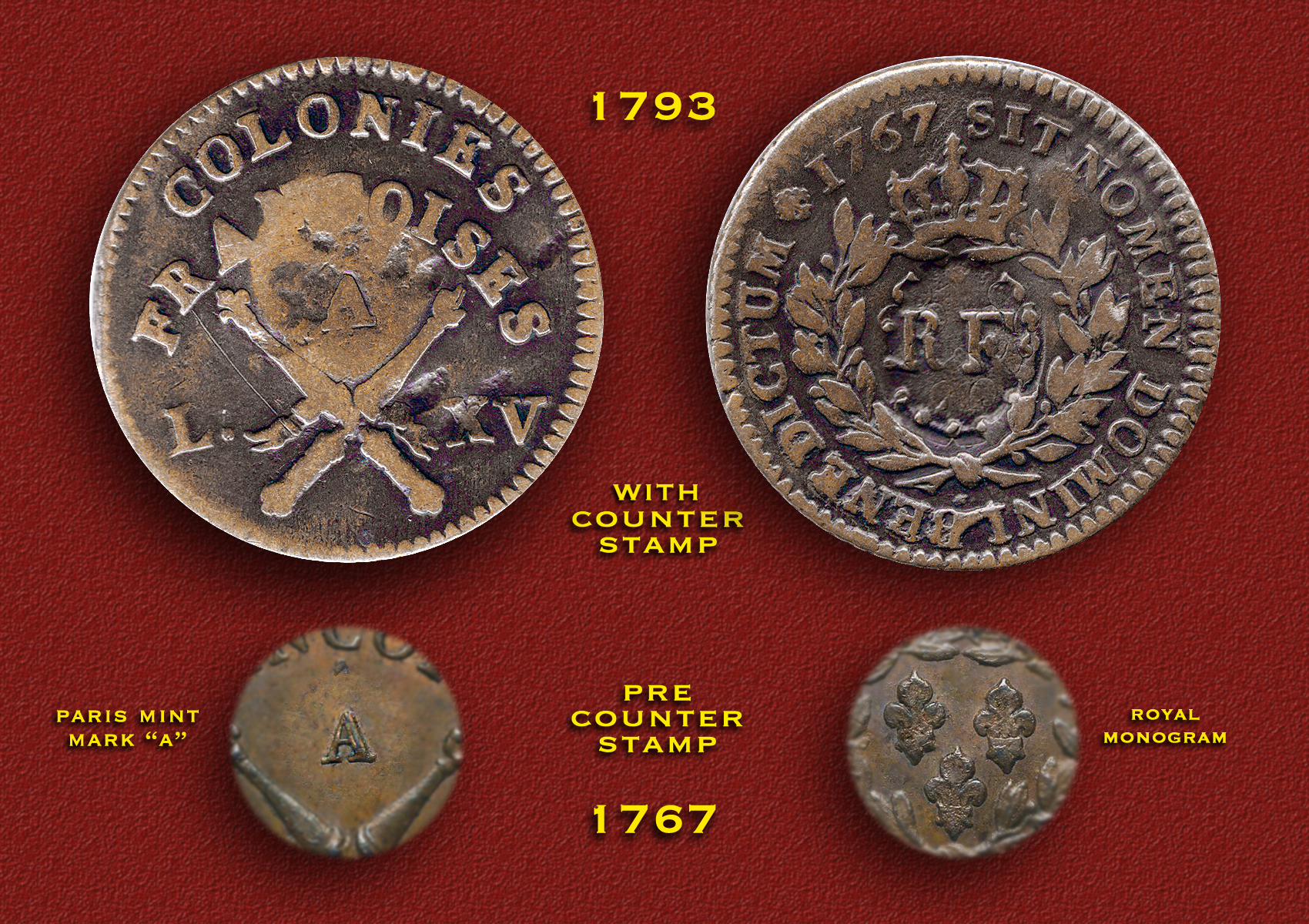
1767 Louis XV Colonies Françoises (West Indies) 12 Diniers copper Sous (w/1793 "RF" counterstamp)

As the French empire in North America grew, the French also began to build a smaller but more profitable empire in the West Indies. Settlement along the South American coast in what is today French Guiana began in 1624, and a colony was founded on Saint Kitts in 1625 (the island had to be shared with the English until the Treaty of Utrecht in 1713, when it was ceded outright). The current isle of the Commonwealth of Dominica in the eastern Caribbean also fell under increasing French settlement from the early 1630s. The Compagnie des Îles de l'Amérique founded colonies in Guadeloupe and Martinique in 1635, and a colony was later founded on Saint Lucia by (1650). The food-producing plantations of these colonies were built and sustained through slavery, with the supply of slaves dependent on the African slave trade. Local resistance by the indigenous peoples resulted in the Carib Expulsion of 1660. France's most important Caribbean colonial possession was established in 1664, when the colony of Saint-Domingue (today's Haiti) was founded on the western half of the Spanish island of Hispaniola. In the 18th century, Saint-Domingue grew to be the richest sugar colony in the Caribbean. The eastern half of Hispaniola (today's Dominican Republic) also came under French rule for a short period, after being given to France by Spain in 1795.

=== Asia (first empire) ===
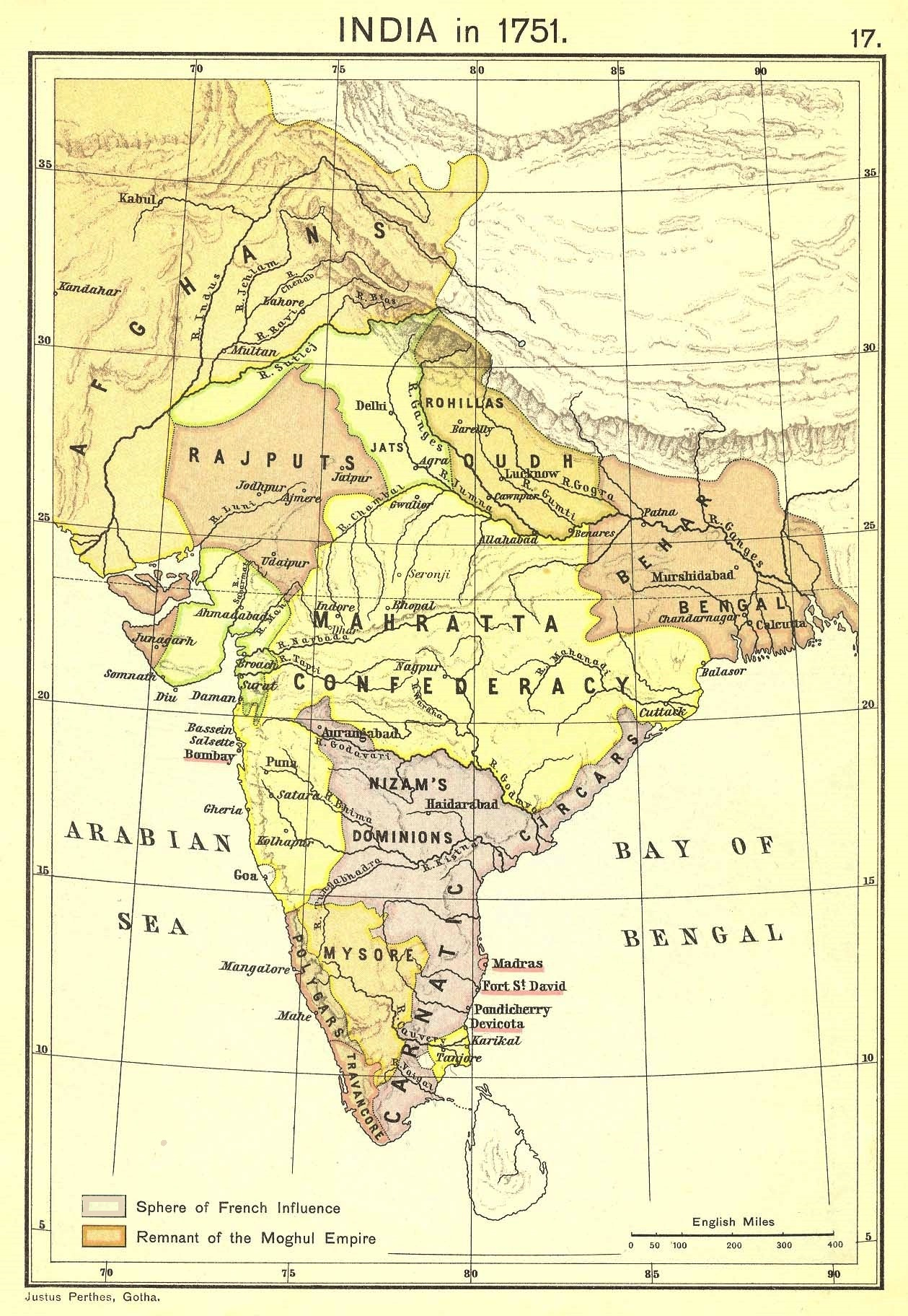
India at the height of French influence in 1751

With the end of the French Wars of Religion, in 1598, King Henry IV encouraged various enterprises to establish trade with the Africa and Asia due to their relations at the time. In December 1600, a company was formed through the association of Saint-Malo, Laval, and Vitré to trade with the Moluccas and Japan. Two ships, the Croissant and the Corbin, were sent around the Cape of Good Hope in May 1601. One was wrecked in the Maldives, leading to the adventure of François Pyrard de Laval, who managed to return to France in 1611. The second ship, carrying François Martin de Vitré, reached Ceylon and traded with Aceh in Sumatra, but was captured by the Dutch on the return leg at Cape Finisterre. François Martin de Vitré was the first Frenchman to write an account of travels to the Far East in 1604, at the request of Henry IV, and from that time numerous accounts on Asia would be published.

From 1604 to 1609, following the return of François Martin de Vitré, Henry developed a strong enthusiasm for travel to Asia and attempted to set up a French East India Company on the model of England and the Netherlands. On 1 June 1604, he issued letters patent to Dieppe merchants to form the first French East Indies Company, giving them exclusive rights to Asian trade for 15 years. No ships were sent, however, until 1616. In 1609, another adventurer, Pierre-Olivier Malherbe, returned from a circumnavigation of the globe and informed Henry of his adventures. He had visited China and India and had an encounter with Akbar.

Colonies were established in India's Chandernagore (1673) and Pondichéry in the south east (1674), and later at Yanam (1723), Mahe (1725), and Karikal (1739) (see French India).

In 1664, the French East India Company was established to compete for trade in the east.

=== Africa (first empire) ===
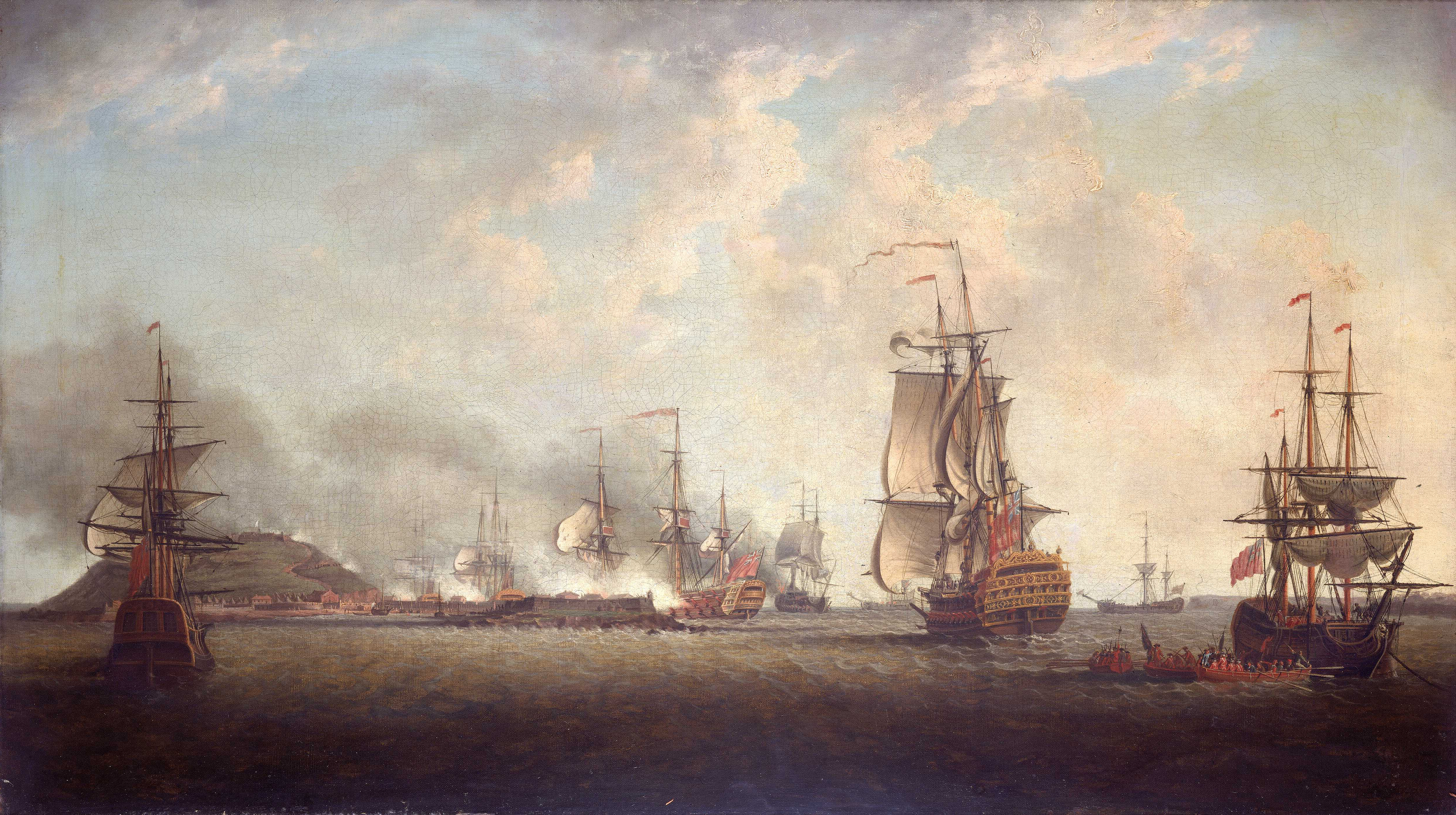
British attack on the French-controlled island of Gorée off the coast of Senegal during the Seven Years' War in 1758

Although initial French colonization primarily occurred in the Americas and in Asia, the French did establish a few colonies and trading posts on the African continent. Initial French colonization in Africa began in modern-day Senegal, Madagascar, and along the Mascarene Islands. Initial French colonial projects, partially administered by the French East India Company, prioritized plantation economies and slave labor. These economies were based on monoculture agriculture and forced African labor. Poor living conditions, famines, and disease made enslaved labor conditions particularly lethal across French colonies. French presence in Senegal began in 1626, although formal colonies and trading posts were not established until 1659 with the founding of Saint-Louis, and 1677 with the founding of Gorée. Additionally, the first settlement of Madagascar began in 1642 with the establishment of Fort Dauphin.

Initial French colonial expansion in Senegal and Madagascar was primarily motivated by desires to secure access to natural resources including gum arabic, groundnuts (or peanuts) and other raw materials. In addition they were further motivated by desires throughout the 17th and 19th century to secure access to and control the slave trade. Through an emphasis on controlling seaports, the French sought to forcibly extract enslaved people to send them abroad for profit.

Colonial development prioritized export oriented production while local industry remained very underdeveloped. There was high development of production for export oriented production, notably of ground nuts in Senegal. In additional coastal areas, the French set up slave plantations. Initial French development prioritized the building of roads to connect natural resources to harbors and ports.

Additional initial French settlements were established on the Mascarene Islands which include Reunion Island, Mauritius, and Rodrigues. Reunion Island was first settled in 1642 and was administered by the French East India Company starting in 1665.

After initial settlement by the Netherlands, France took control of Mauritius, which it renamed the Island of France in 1721. Furthermore, France took control of Rodrigues in 1735 and Seychelles in 1756.

On Reunion Island (Bourbon Island), the French East India Company first introduced the slave trade in the 1730s. The French East India Company additionally introduced coffee and sought to create a plantation economy centered around forced labor.

Characteristic of plantation colonies, the French colonists were a minority on Reunion Island. In 1763 there were only 4,000 French colonists while there were over 18,000 African enslaved people. The majority of enslaved people on Reunion Island worked on coffee plantations. They primarily came from Madagascar, Mozambique, and Senegal.

The economy of the Mauritius (Island of France) was similarly based on an exploitative plantation system dependent on forced African labor. The monoculture plantations farmed sugar cane, cotton, indigo, rice, and wheat. Around 2,000 colonists and enslaved people from Reunion Island migrated to Mauritius.

Conditions for enslaved people on the Mascarene Island plantations were very poor. Enslaved labor was highly lethal because of poor living conditions and famines. After a series of crop failures from 1725 to 1737, as much as 10% of the islands' enslaved populations died due to famine and disease.

=== Collapse of First French colonial empire ===
==== Colonial conflict with Britain ====
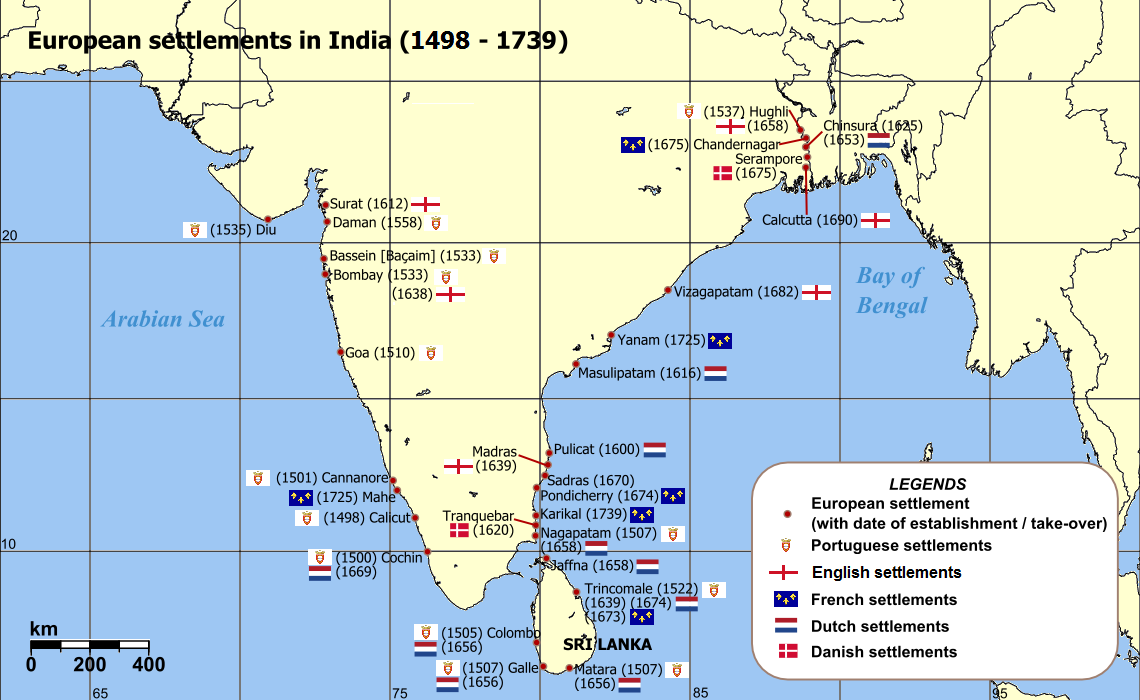
French and other European settlements in Colonial India

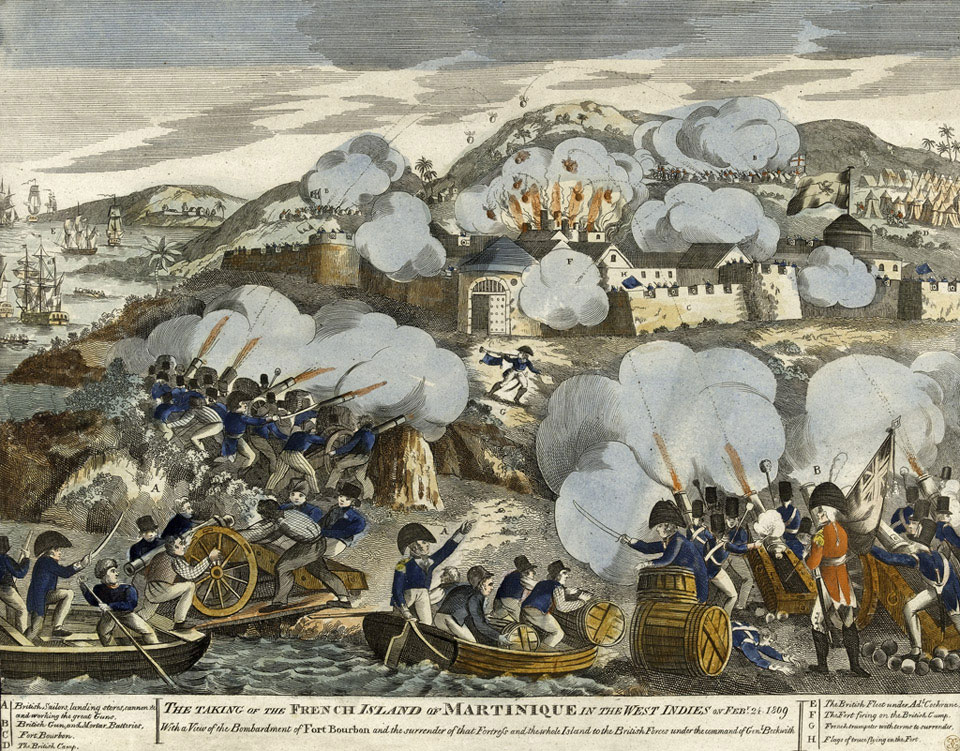
The British invasion of Martinique in 1809

In the middle of the 18th century, a series of colonial conflicts began between France and Britain, which ultimately resulted in the destruction of most of the first French colonial empire and the near-complete expulsion of France from the Americas. These wars were the War of the Austrian Succession (1740–1748), the Seven Years' War (1756–1763), the American Revolution (1775–1783), the French Revolutionary Wars (1793–1802) and the Napoleonic Wars (1803–1815). It may even be seen further back in time to the first of the French and Indian Wars. This cyclic conflict is sometimes known as the Second Hundred Years' War.

Although the War of the Austrian Succession was indecisive – despite French successes in India under the French Governor-General Joseph François Dupleix and Europe under Marshal Saxe – the Seven Years' War, after early French successes in Menorca and North America, saw a French defeat, with the numerically superior British (over one million to about 50 thousand French settlers) conquering not only New France (excluding the small islands of Saint Pierre and Miquelon), but also most of France's West Indian (Caribbean) colonies, and all of the French Indian outposts.

While the peace treaty saw France's Indian outposts, and the Caribbean islands of Martinique and Guadeloupe restored to France, the competition for influence in India had been won by the British, and North America was entirely lost – most of New France was taken by Britain (also referred to as British North America), except Louisiana, which France ceded to Spain as payment for Spain's late entrance into the war (and as compensation for Britain's annexation of Spanish Florida). Also ceded to the British were Grenada and Saint Lucia in the West Indies. Although the loss of Canada would cause much regret in future generations, it excited little unhappiness at the time; colonialism was widely regarded as both unimportant to France, and immoral.

Some recovery of the French colonial empire was made during the French intervention in the American Revolution, with Saint Lucia being returned to France by the Treaty of Paris in 1783, but not nearly as much as had been hoped for at the time of French intervention.

==== Haitian Revolution ====
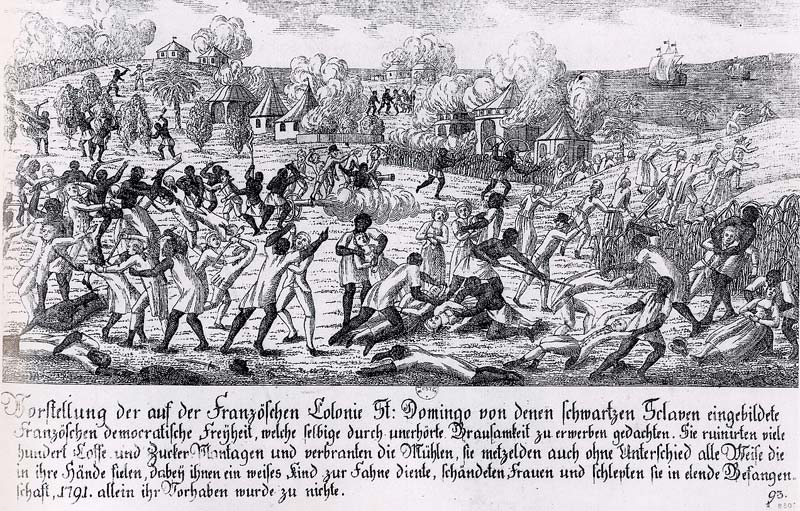
Saint-Domingue slave revolt in 1791

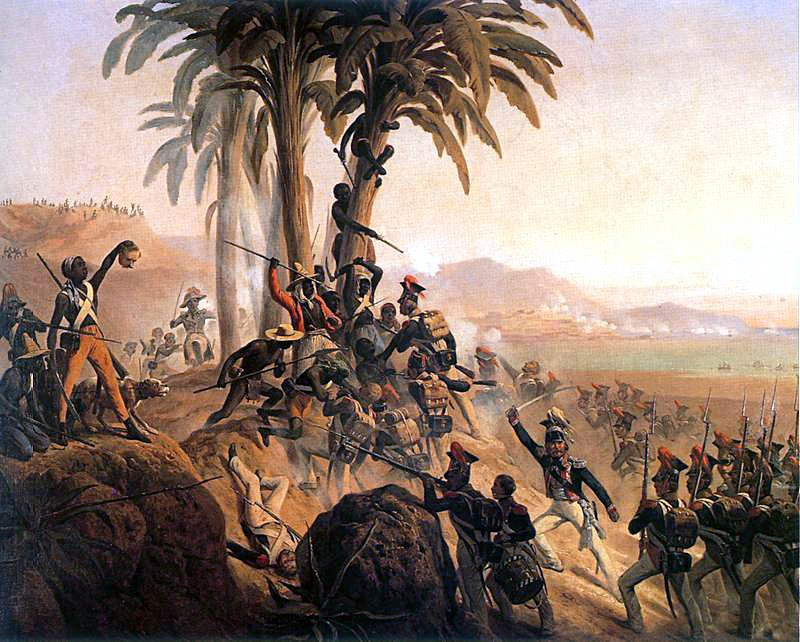
Napoleon's Saint-Domingue expedition in 1801–1803

True disaster came to what remained of France's colonial empire in 1791 when Saint Domingue (the Western third of the Caribbean island of Hispaniola), France's richest and most important colony, was riven by a massive slave revolt, caused partly by the divisions among the island's elite, which had resulted from the French Revolution of 1789.

The slaves, led eventually by Toussaint L'Ouverture and then, following his capture by the French in 1801, by Jean-Jacques Dessalines, held their own against French and British opponents. The French launched a failed expedition in 1802, and were up against a crippling Royal Naval blockade the following year. As a result, the Empire of Haiti ultimately achieved independence in 1804 (becoming the first black republic in the world, followed by Liberia in 1847). The black and mulatto population of the island (including the Spanish east) had declined from 700,000 in 1789 to 351,819 in 1804. About 80,000 Haitians died in the 1802–03 campaign alone. Of the 55,131 French soldiers dispatched to Haiti in 1802–03, 45,000, including 18 generals, died, along with 10,000 sailors, the great majority from disease. Captain [first name unknown] Sorrell of the British navy observed, "France lost there one of the finest armies she ever sent forth, composed of picked veterans, the conquerors of Italy and of German legions. She is now entirely deprived of her influence and her power in the West Indies."

Meanwhile, France's newly resumed war with Britain resulted in the British capture of practically all remaining French colonies. These were restored at the Treaty of Amiens in 1802, but when war resumed in 1803, the British soon recaptured them. France's 1800 recovery of Louisiana from Spain in the secret Third Treaty of San Ildefonso came to nothing, as the success of the Haitian Revolution convinced Napoleon that holding Louisiana would not be worth the cost, leading to its sale to the United States in 1803.

==== Failed invasion of Egypt ====
The French attempt to establish a colony in Egypt in 1798–1801 was not successful. Battle casualties for the campaign were at least 15,000 killed or wounded and 8,500 prisoners for France; 50,000 killed or wounded and 15,000 prisoners for Turkey, Egypt, other Ottoman lands, and Britain.

== Second French colonial empire (post-1830) ==
Animated map showing the growth and decline of the first and second French colonial empires

At the close of the Napoleonic Wars, most of France's colonies were restored to it by Britain, notably Guadeloupe and Martinique in the West Indies, French Guiana on the coast of South America, various trading posts in Senegal, the Île Bourbon (Réunion) in the Indian Ocean, and France's tiny Indian possessions; however, Britain finally annexed Saint Lucia, Tobago, the Seychelles, and the Isle de France (now Mauritius).

In 1825 Charles X sent an expedition to Haïti, resulting in the Haiti indemnity controversy.

The beginnings of the second French colonial empire were laid in 1830 with the French invasion of Algeria, which was fully conquered by 1903. Historian Ben Kiernan estimates that 825,000 Algerians died during the conquest by 1875.

=== Africa (second empire) ===
==== Morocco ====
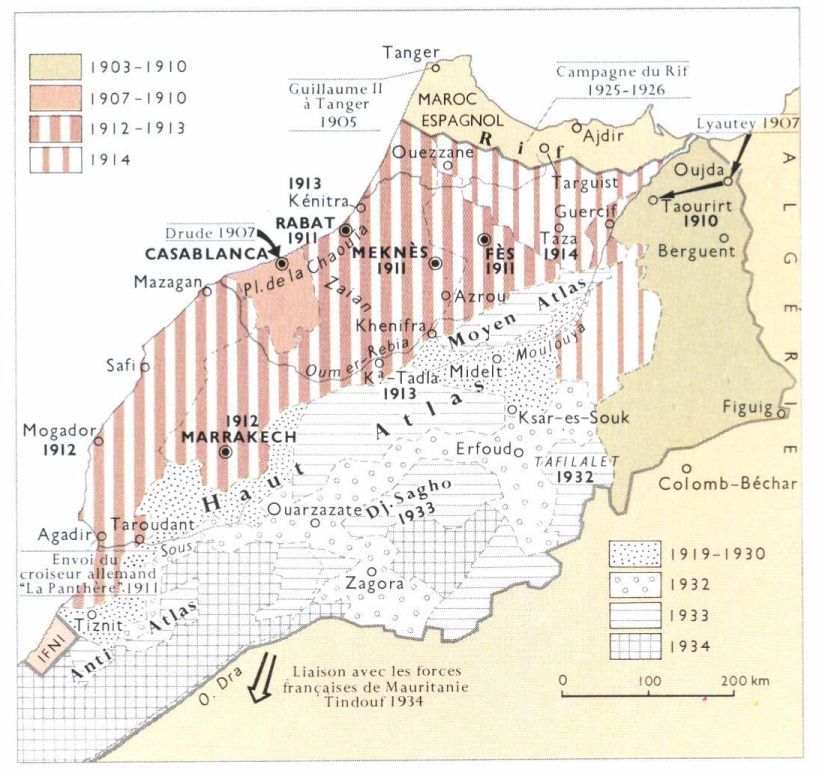
Map depicting the staged French pacification of Morocco through to 1934

The French Colonial Empire established a protectorate in Morocco between the years of 1912 to 1956. France's general approach to governing the protectorate of Morocco was a policy of in-direct rule where they co-opted existing governance systems to control the protectorate. Specifically, the Moroccan elite and Sultan were both left in control while being strongly influenced by the French government.

French colonialism in Morocco was discriminatory against native Moroccans and highly detrimental to the Moroccan economy. Moroccans were treated as second class citizens and discriminated against in all aspects of colonial life. Infrastructure was discriminatory in colonial Morocco. The French colonial government built 36.5 kilometers of sewers in the new neighborhoods created to accommodate new French settlers while only 4.3 kilometers of sewers were built in indigenous Moroccan communities. Additionally, land in Morocco was far more expensive for Moroccans than for French settlers. For example, while the average Moroccan had a plot of land 50 times smaller than their French settler counterparts, Moroccans were forced to pay 24% more per hectare. Moroccans were additionally prohibited from buying land from French settlers.

Colonial Morocco's economy was designed to benefit French businesses at the detriment of Moroccan laborers. Morocco was forced to import all of its goods from France despite higher costs. Additionally, improvements to agriculture and irrigation systems in Morocco exclusively benefited colonial agriculturalists while leaving Moroccan farms at a technological disadvantage.

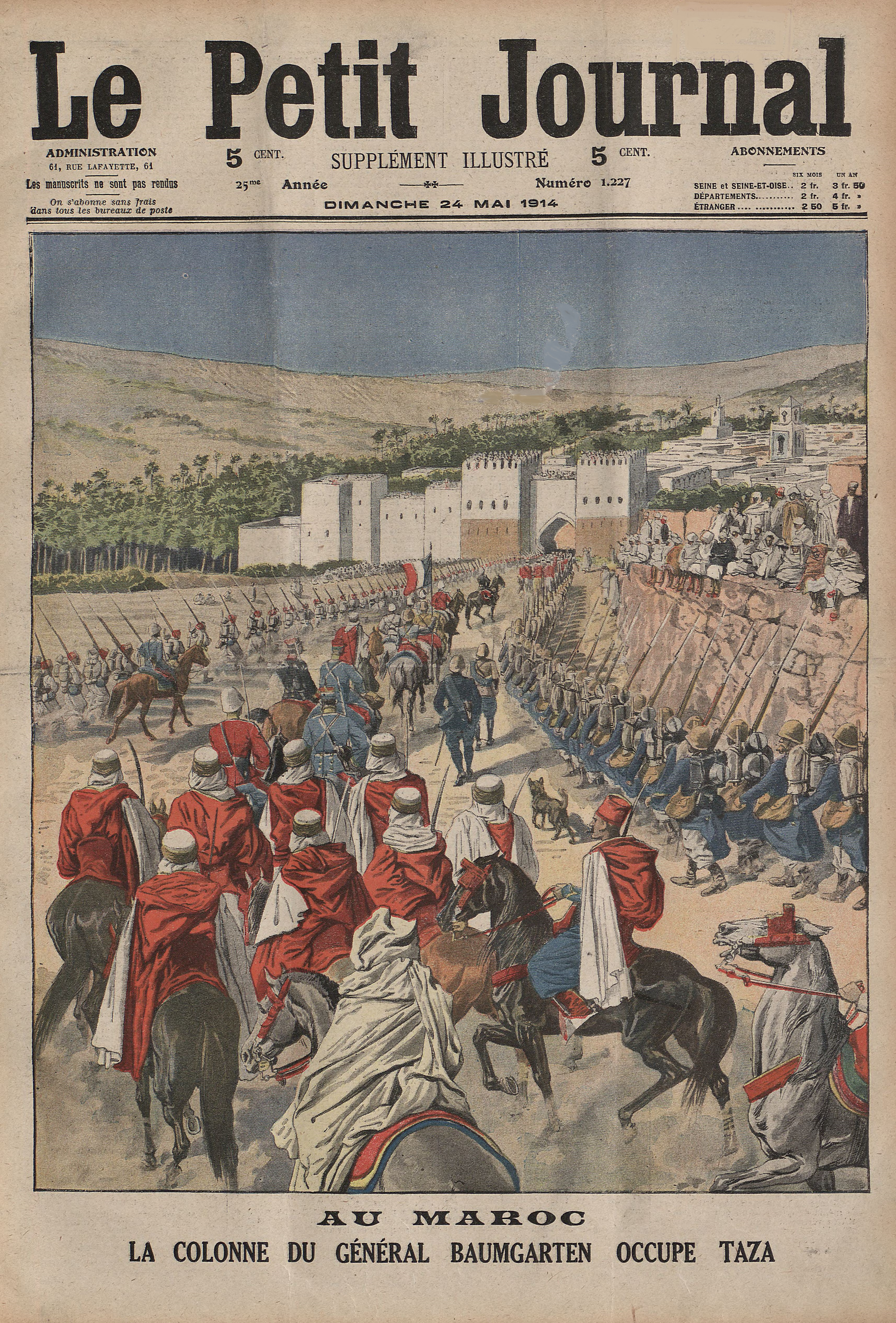
Le Petit Journal: French occupation of Taza in May 1914

Between the years of 1914 to 1921 the Zaian Confederation of Berber Tribes, primarily from the Atlas Mountain region of Morocco, staged an armed resistance against French colonial control. The outbreak of World War One prevented the French from committing fully to the conflict, and thus the French forces suffered high losses. For example, at the Battle of El Herri in 1914, 600 French soldiers were killed. The fighting was primarily characterized by Guerrilla warfare. The Zaian forces additionally received military and economic support from the Central Powers.

The Berber independence leader Abd el-Krim (1882–1963) organized armed resistance against the Spanish and French for control of Morocco. The Spanish had faced unrest off and on from the 1890s, but in 1921 Spanish forces were massacred at the Battle of Annual. El-Krim founded an independent Rif Republic that operated until 1926 but had no international recognition. Paris and Madrid agreed to collaborate to destroy it. They sent in 200,000 soldiers, forcing el-Krim to surrender in 1926; he was exiled in the Pacific until 1947. Morocco became quiet, and in 1936 became the base from which Francisco Franco launched his revolt against Madrid.

==== Tunisia ====
The French protectorate of Tunisia lasted from 1881 to 1956. The protectorate was initially established after the successful invasion of Tunisia in 1881. The groundwork for occupation was laid on April 24, 1881, when the French deployed 35,000 troops from Algeria to invade several Tunisian cities.

As in Morocco, the French governed indirectly and preserved the existing government structure. The bey remained an absolute monarch, Tunisian ministers were still appointed, although they were both subject to French authority. Over time, the French gradually weakened the existing structures of power and centralized power into a French colonial administration.

==== French West Africa ====
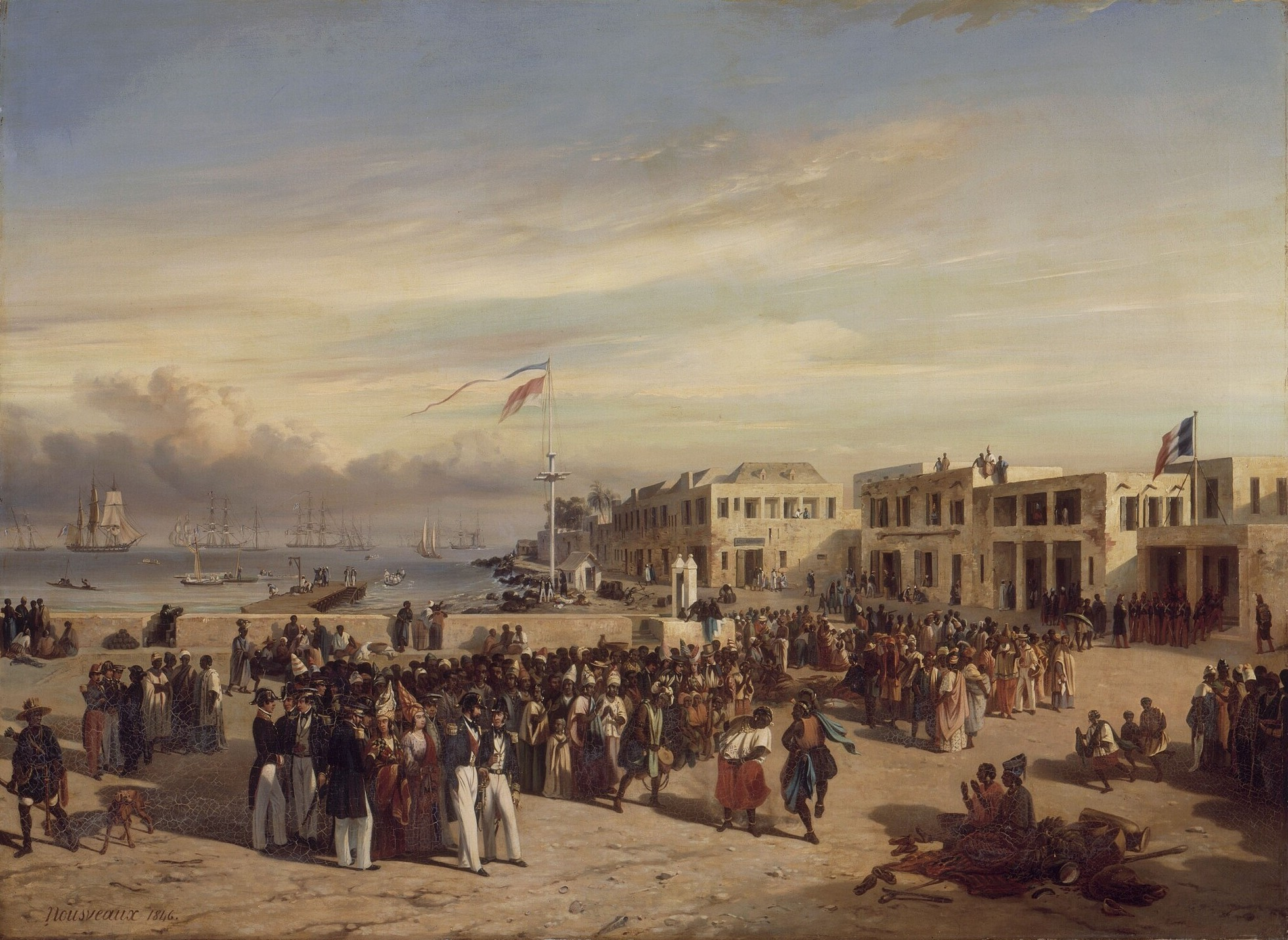
French trading post on Gorée, an island offshore of Senegal

French West Africa was a confederation of eight other French colonial territories including French Mauritania, French Senegal, French Guinea, French Ivory Coast, French Niger, French Upper Volta, French Dahomey, French Togoland, and French Sudan.

At the beginning of Napoleon III's reign, the presence of France in Senegal was limited to a trading post on the island of Gorée, a narrow strip on the coast, the town of Saint-Louis, and a handful of trading posts in the interior. The economy had largely been based on the slave trade, carried out by the rulers of the small kingdoms of the interior, as well as elite families, until France abolished slavery in its colonies in 1848. In 1854, Napoleon III named an enterprising French officer, Louis Faidherbe, to govern and expand the colony, and to give it the beginning of a modern economy. Faidherbe built a series of forts along the Senegal River, formed alliances with leaders in the interior, and sent expeditions against those who resisted French rule. He built a new port at Dakar, established and protected telegraph lines and roads, followed these with a rail line between Dakar and Saint-Louis and another into the interior. He built schools, bridges, and systems to supply fresh water to the towns. He also introduced the large-scale cultivation of Bambara groundnuts and peanuts as a commercial crop. Reaching into the Niger valley, Senegal became the primary French base in West Africa and a model colony. Dakar became one of the most important cities of the French Empire and of Africa.

While by the 20 century French already controlled southern Niger and Mali, northern nomadic peoples, mostly Tuareg, resisted successfully for many more years. Due to the persistent Tuareg resistance, France did not controlled Sultanate of Agadez until 1904.

==== French Equatorial Africa ====
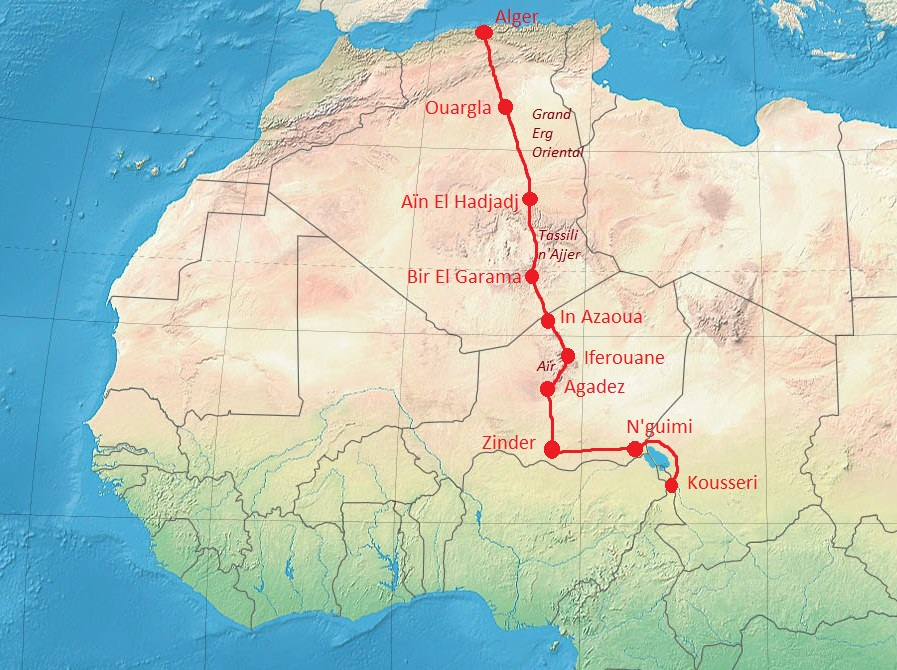
The Foureau-Lamy military expedition sent out from Algiers in 1898 to conquer the Chad Basin and unify all French territories in West Africa.

French Equatorial Africa was a confederation of French colonial possessions in the Sahel and Congo River regions of Africa. Colonies included in French Equatorial Africa include French Gabon, French Congo, Ubangui-Shari, and French Chad.

==== Cameroon ====
Cameroon was initially colonized by the German Empire in 1884. The indigenous people of Cameroon refused to work on German related projects, which turned into force labor. However, after World War One, the colony was partitioned by France and Britain. The French colony lasted from 1916 to until self-rule was achieved in 1960.

==== Madagascar ====
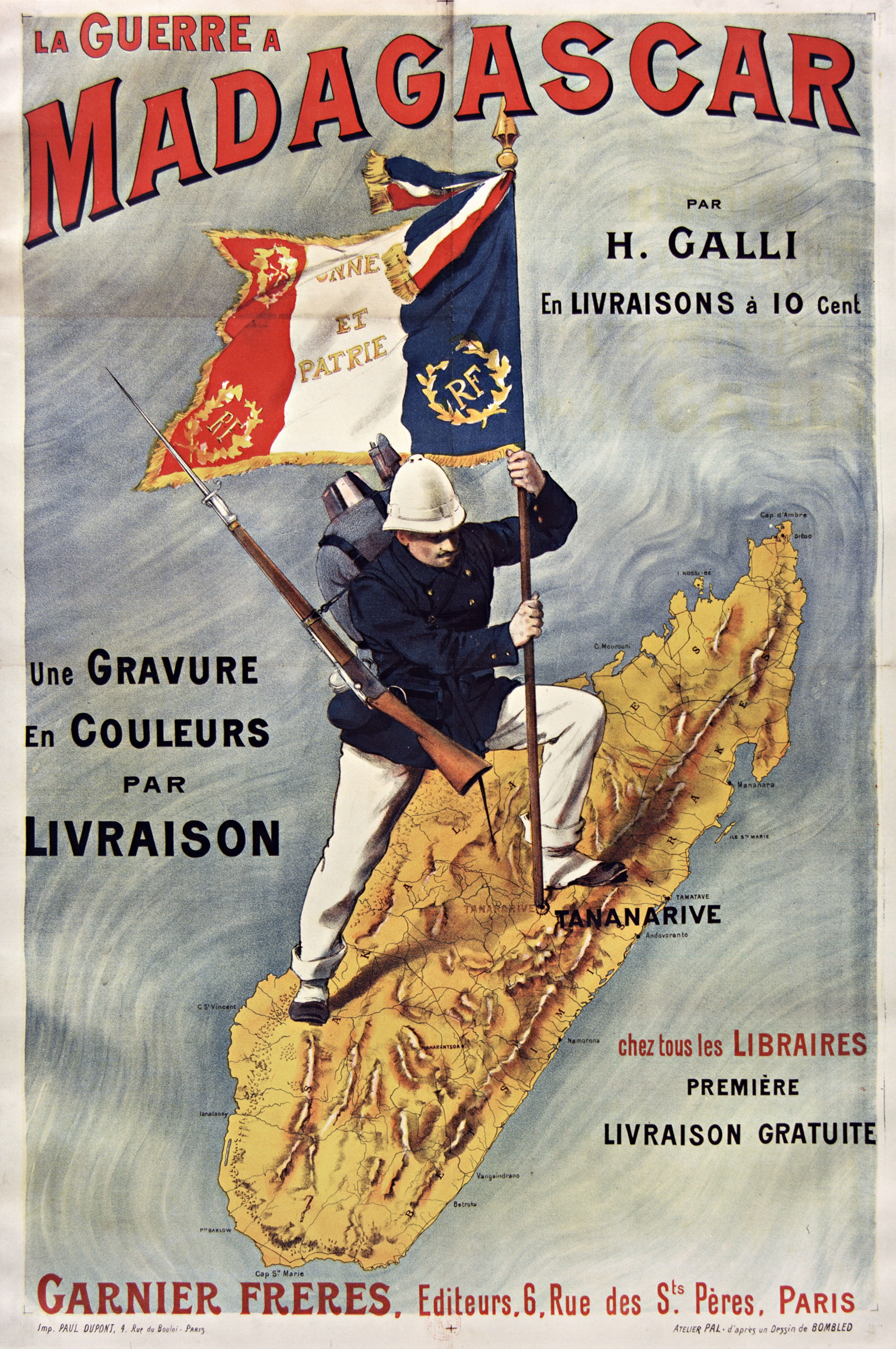
Engraving celebrating the conquest of Madagascar in 1895

French colonialism in Madagascar began in 1896 when France established a protectorate by force and ended in the 1960s with the beginning of self-rule. Under French control, the colony of Madagascar included the dependencies of Comoros, Mayotte, Réunion, Kerguelen, Île Saint-Paul, Amsterdam Island, Crozet Islands, Bassas da India, Europa Island, Juan de Nova Island, Glorioso Islands, and Tromelin.

==== Algeria ====
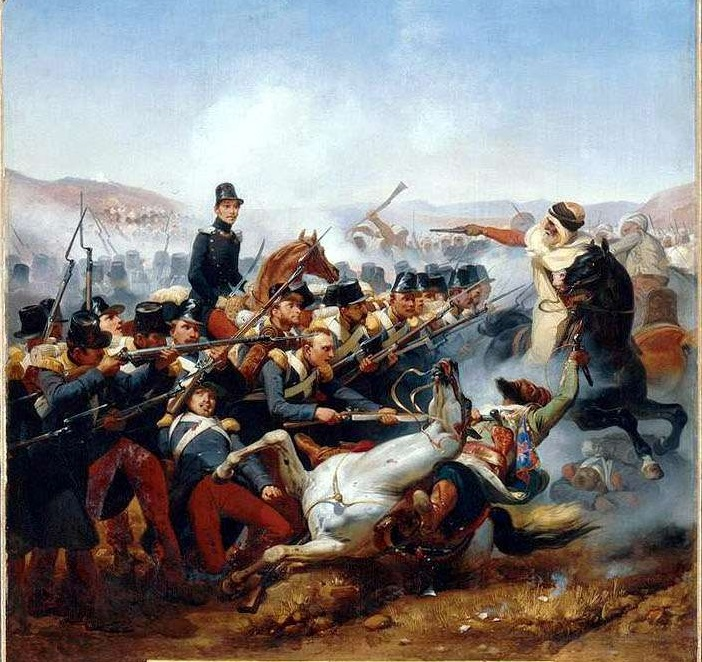
The French conquest of Algeria

The French conquest of Algeria began in 1830 with the invasion of Algiers, and was mostly completed by 1852. Not until 1903 was the conquest fully complete. French colonization of Algeria was undertaken through military conquest and the overthrow of existing structures of government. French colonial rule lasted until Algerian independence in 1962. French colonization of Algeria was defined by its lethality for indigenous Algerians, the dissolution of the Algerian government, and the creation of oppressive and segregationist structures which discriminated against the indigenous population.

The French military invasion of Algeria began in 1830 with a naval blockade around Algeria followed by the landing of 37,000 French soldiers in Algeria. The French captured the strategic port of Algiers in 1830 deposing Hussein Dey, the ruler of the Deylik of Algiers. They also seized other coastal communities. Around 100,000 French soldiers were deployed in the conquest of Algeria. Algerian armed resistance against the French invasion was mainly divided between forces of Ahmed Bey ben Mohamed Chérif at Constantine in the east, who was seeking to reinstate the Deylik of Algiers, and nationalist forces in the west and center. Treaties with the nationalists under Emir Abdelkader enabled the French to focus on the defeating of the remnants of the Deylik during the 1837 Siege of Constantine. Abdelkader continued to fight the French in the west until 1847. Between 500,000 and 1,000,000 Algerians, out of a total of 3 million, were killed during the French conquest as a result of war, massacres, disease and famine. Famines and disease epidemics were partially caused by French confiscation of farmland from Algerians and the "scorched earth" tactics of razing farms and villages to quell Algerian resistance. French losses from 1830 to 1851 were 3,336 killed in action and 92,329 dead in the hospital.

There were about 100,000 European settlers in the country in 1852, at that time, about half of them French. Under the Second Republic the country was ruled by a civilian government, but Louis Napoleon re-established a military government, much to the annoyance of the colonists. By 1857 the army had conquered Kabyle Province, and pacified the country. By 1860 the European population had grown to 200,000, and lands of native Algerians were being rapidly bought and farmed by the new arrivals.

In the first eight years of his rule Napoleon III paid little attention to Algeria. In September 1860, however, he and Empress Eugénie visited Algeria, and the trip made a deep impression upon them. Eugénie was invited to attend a traditional Arab wedding, and the Emperor met many of the local leaders. The Emperor gradually conceived the idea that Algeria should be governed differently from other colonies. In February 1863, he wrote a public letter to Pelissier, the Military Governor, saying: "Algeria is not a colony in the traditional sense, but an Arab kingdom; the local people have, like the colonists, a legal right to my protection. I am just as much the Emperor of the Arabs of Algeria as I am of the French." He intended to rule Algeria through a government of Arab aristocrats. Toward this end he invited the chiefs of main Algerian tribal groups to his chateau at Compiegne for hunting and festivities.

Compared to previous administrations, Napoleon III was far more sympathetic to the native Algerians. He halted European migration inland, restricting them to the coastal zone. He also freed the Algerian rebel leader Abd al Qadir (who had been promised freedom on surrender but was imprisoned by the previous administration) and gave him a stipend of 150,000 francs. He allowed Muslims to serve in the military and civil service on theoretically equal terms and allowed them to migrate to France. In addition, he gave the option of citizenship; however, for Muslims to take this option they had to accept all of the French civil code, including parts governing inheritance and marriage which conflicted with Muslim laws, and they had to reject the competence of religious Sharia courts. This was interpreted by some Muslims as requiring them to give up parts of their religion to obtain citizenship and was resented.

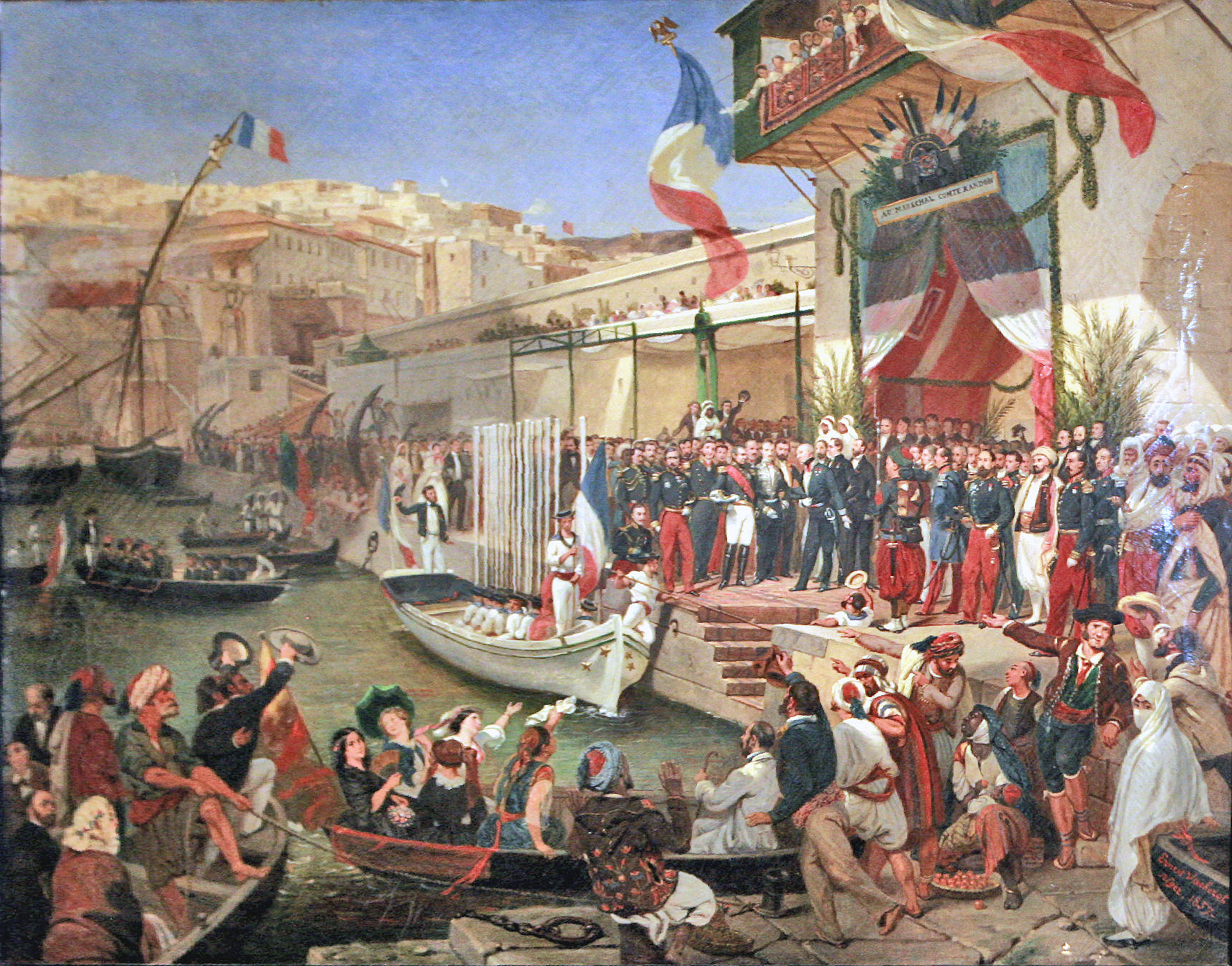
Arrival of Marshal Randon in Algiers in 1857 by Ernest Francis Vacherot

More importantly, Napoleon III changed the system of land tenure. While ostensibly well-intentioned, in effect this move destroyed the traditional system of land management and deprived many Algerians of land. While Napoleon did renounce state claims to tribal lands, he also began a process of dismantling tribal land ownership in favour of individual land ownership. This process was corrupted by French officials sympathetic to the French in Algeria who took much of the land they surveyed into public domain. In addition, many tribal leaders, chosen for loyalty to the French rather than influence in their tribe, immediately sold communal land for cash.

His attempted reforms were interrupted in 1864 by an Arab insurrection, which required more than a year and an army of 85,000 soldiers to suppress. Nonetheless, he did not give up his idea of making Algeria a model where French colonists and Arabs could live and work together as equals. He traveled to Algiers for a second time on 3 May 1865, and this time he remained for a month, meeting with tribal leaders and local officials. He offered a wide amnesty to participants of the insurrection, and promised to name Arabs to high positions in his government. He also promised a large public works program of new ports, railroads, and roads. However, once again his plans met a major natural obstacle in 1866 and 1868, Algeria was struck by an epidemic of cholera, clouds of locusts, drought and famine, and his reforms were hindered by the French colonists, who voted massively against him in the plebiscites of his late reign. Up to 500,000 people died from the famine and epidemics.

In 1871, in response to prolonged famine and the French authorities' discriminatory treatment of Algerians, the Mokrani Revolt in the Kabylia erupted, which spread through much of Algeria. By April 1871, 250 tribes were rebelling. The uprising was defeated in 1872. There were roughly 130,000 colonists in Algeria in 1871 and by 1900, there were one million. In 1902, a French military expedition entered Hoggar Mountains and defeated the kingdom of Kel Ahaggar. The conquest of Algeria was completed in 1920 when the Kel Ajjer gave up their resistance to the French colonial power.

==== Summary of additional colonization in Africa ====
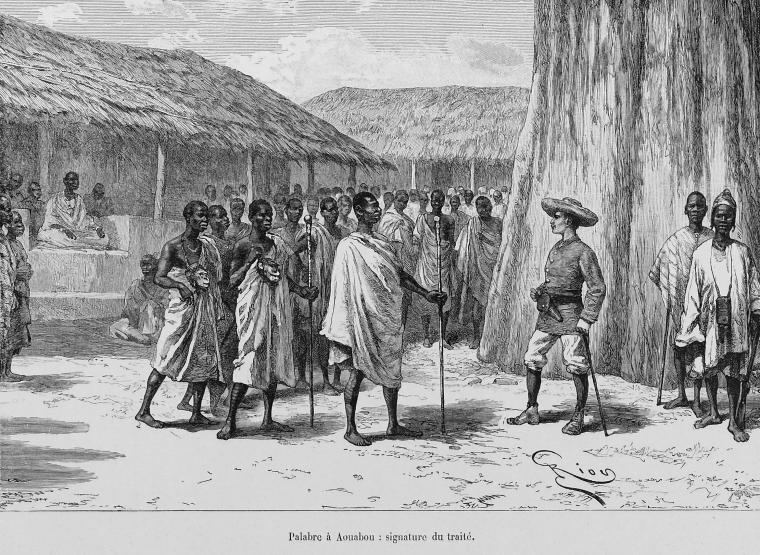
Louis-Gustave Binger signing treaty with Famienkro leaders, 1892, in present-day Ivory Coast

France also extended its influence in North Africa after 1870, establishing a protectorate in Tunisia in 1881 with the Bardo Treaty. Gradually, French control crystallised over much of North, West, and Central Africa by around the start of the 20th century (including the modern states of Mauritania, Senegal, Guinea, Mali, Ivory Coast, Benin, Niger, Chad, Central African Republic, Republic of the Congo, Gabon, Cameroon, the east African coastal enclave of Djibouti (Obock Territory), and the island of Madagascar.

Pierre Savorgnan de Brazza helped to formalise French control in Gabon and on the northern banks of the Congo River from the early 1880s. The explorer Colonel Parfait-Louis Monteil traveled from Senegal to Lake Chad in 1890–1892, signing treaties of friendship and protection with the rulers of several of the countries he passed through, and gaining much knowledge of the geography and politics of the region.

The Voulet–Chanoine Mission, a military expedition, set out from Senegal in 1898 to conquer the Chad Basin and to unify all French territories in West Africa. This expedition operated jointly with two other expeditions, the Foureau–Lamy and Gentil Missions, which advanced from Algeria and Middle Congo respectively. With the death (April 1900) of the Muslim warlord Rabih az-Zubayr, the greatest ruler in the region, and the creation of the Military Territory of Chad (September 1900), the Voulet–Chanoine Mission had accomplished all its goals. The ruthlessness of the mission provoked a scandal in Paris.

Central and east Africa, 1898, during the Fashoda Incident

As a part of the Scramble for Africa, France aimed to establish a continuous west–east axis across the continent, in contrast with the proposed British north–south axis. Tensions between Britain and France heightened in Africa. At several points war seemed possible, but no outbreak occurred. The most serious episode was the Fashoda Incident of 1898. French troops tried to claim an area in the Southern Sudan, and a British force purporting to act in the interests of the Khedive of Egypt arrived to confront them. Under heavy pressure, the French withdrew, implicitly acknowledging Anglo-Egyptian control over the area. An agreement between the two states recognised the status quo. The British were to maintain control over Egypt, while France remained the dominant power in Morocco. Still, it is commonly believed that France suffered a humiliating defeat overall.

During the Agadir Crisis in 1911, Britain supported France against Germany, and Morocco became a French protectorate.

The French made their last major colonial gains after World War I, when they gained mandates over the former territories of the Ottoman Empire that make up what is now Syria and Lebanon, as well as most of the former German colonies of Togo and Cameroon.

=== Pacific Islands ===
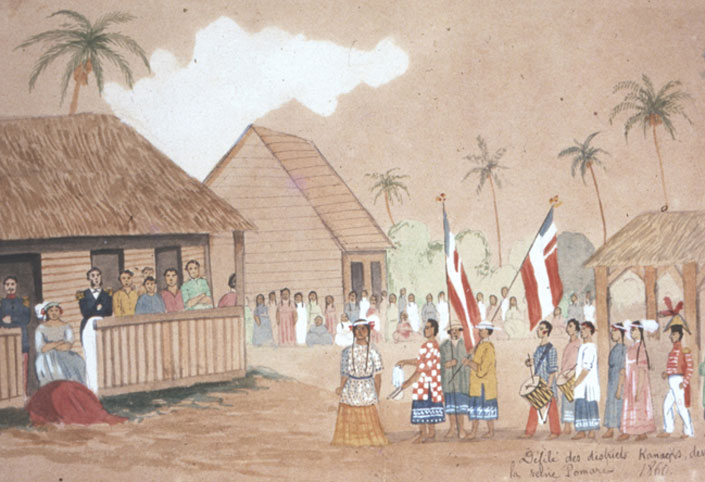
Queen Pōmare IV in 1860. Tahiti was made a French protectorate in 1842, and annexed as a colony of France in 1880.

In 1838, the French naval commander Abel Aubert du Petit-Thouars responded to complaints of the mistreatment of French Catholic missionary in the Kingdom of Tahiti ruled by Queen Pōmare IV. Dupetit Thouars forced the native government to pay an indemnity and sign a treaty of friendship with France respecting the rights of French subjects in the islands including any future Catholic missionaries. Four years later, claiming the Tahitians had violated the treaty, a French protectorate was forcibly installed and the queen made to sign a request for French protection.

Queen Pōmare left her kingdom and exiled herself to Raiatea in protest against the French and tried to enlist the help of Queen Victoria. The Franco-Tahitian War broke out between the Tahitian people and the French from 1844 to 1847 as France attempted to consolidate their rule and extend their rule into the Leeward Islands where Queen Pōmare sought refuge with her relatives. The British remained officially neutral during the war but diplomatic tensions existed between the French and British. The French succeeded in subduing the guerilla forces on Tahiti but failed to hold the other islands. In February 1847, Queen Pōmare IV returned from her self-imposed exile and acquiesced to rule under the protectorate. Although victorious, the French were not able to annex the islands due to diplomatic pressure from Great Britain, so Tahiti and its dependency Moorea continued to be ruled under the protectorate. A clause to the war settlement, known as the Jarnac Convention or the Anglo-French Convention of 1847, was signed by France and Great Britain, in which the two powers agreed to respect the independence of Queen Pōmare's allies in Leeward Islands. The French continued the guise of protection until the 1880s when they formally annexed Tahiti with the abdication of King Pōmare V on 29 June 1880. The Leeward Islands were annexed through the Leewards War which ended in 1897. These conflicts and the annexation of other Pacific islands formed French Oceania.

On 24 September 1853, Admiral Febvrier Despointes took formal possession of New Caledonia and Port-de-France (Nouméa) was founded 25 June 1854. A few dozen free settlers settled on the west coast in the following years, but New Caledonia became a penal colony and, from the 1860s until the end of the transportations in 1897, about 22,000 criminals and political prisoners were sent to New Caledonia.

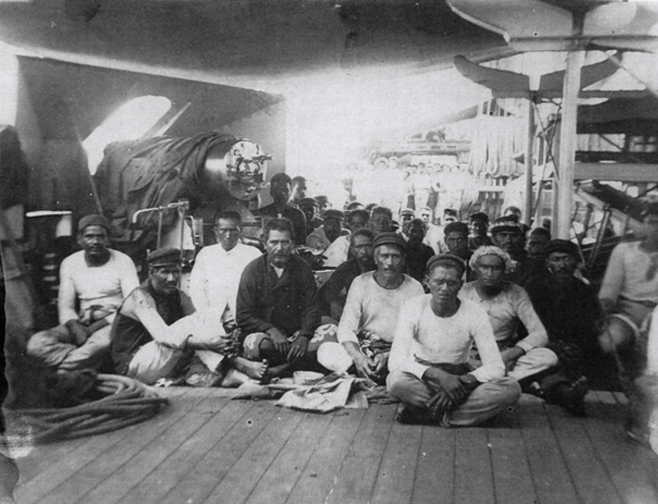
The captured rebels of Raiatea, 1897

In contravention of the Jarnac Convention of 1847, the French placed the Leeward Islands under a provisional protectorate by falsely convincing the ruling chiefs that the German Empire planned to take over their island kingdoms. After years of diplomatic negotiation, Britain and France agreed to abrogate the convention in 1887 and the French formally annexed all the Leeward Islands without official treaties of cession from the islands' sovereign governments. From 1888 to 1897, the natives of the kingdom of Raiatea and Tahaa led by a minor chief, Teraupo'o, fought off French rule and the annexation of the Leeward Islands. Anti-French factions in the kingdom of Huahine also attempted to fight off the French under Queen Teuhe while the kingdom of Bora Bora remained neutral but hostile to the French. The conflict ended in 1897 with the capture and exile of rebel leaders to New Caledonia and more than one hundred rebels to the Marquesas. These conflicts and the annexation of other Pacific islands formed French Polynesia.

At this time, the French also established colonies in the South Pacific, including New Caledonia, the various island groups which make up French Polynesia (including the Society Islands, the Marquesas, the Gambier Islands, the Austral Islands, and the Tuamotus), and established joint control of the New Hebrides with Britain.

==== Napoleon III: 1852–1870 ====
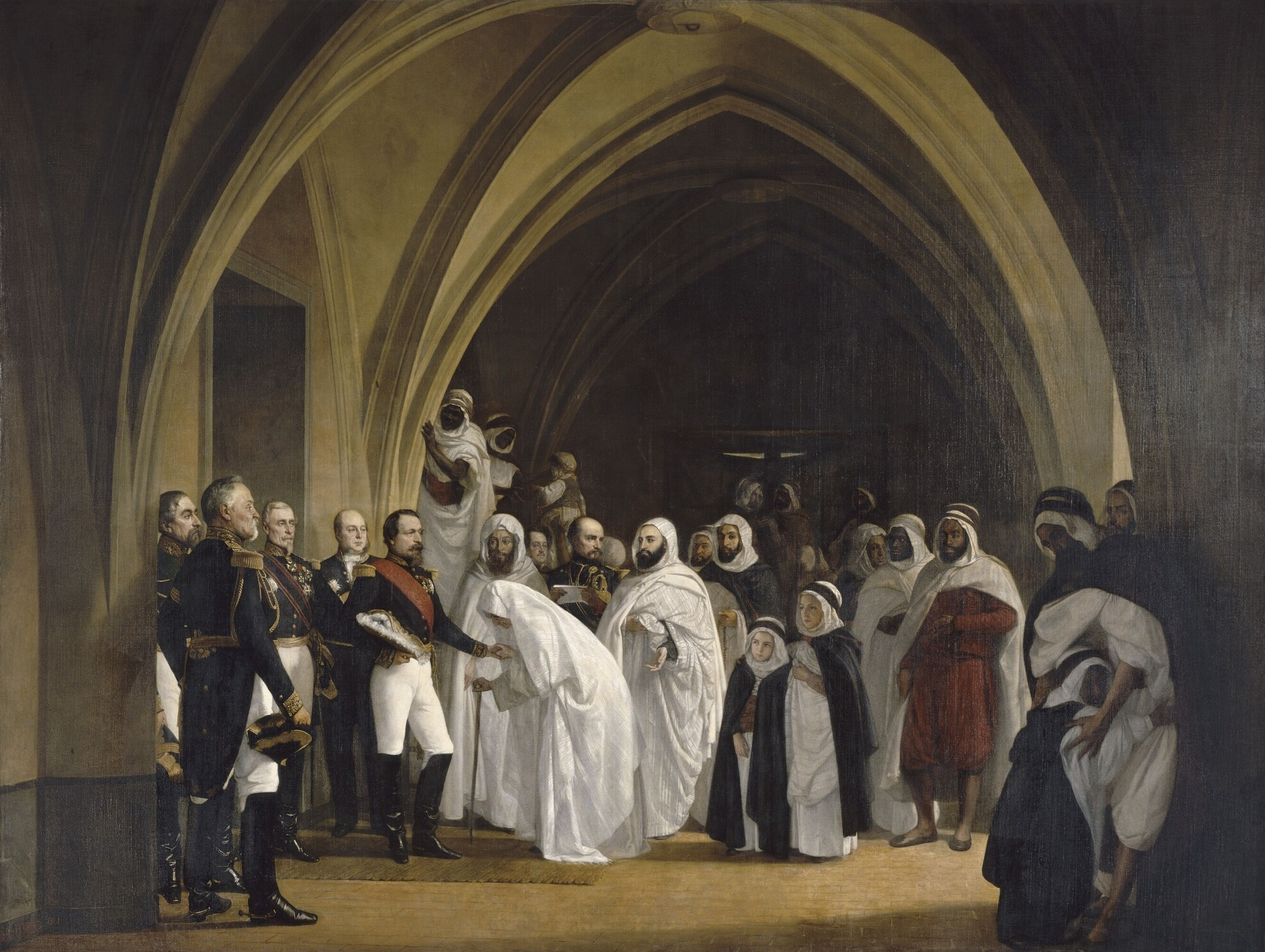
Napoleon III and Abdelkader El Djezairi, the Algerian military leader who led a struggle against the French invasion of Algeria

Napoleon III doubled the area of the French overseas Empire; he established French rule in New Caledonia, and Cochinchina, established a protectorate in Cambodia (1863); and colonized parts of Africa.

To carry out his new overseas projects, Napoleon III created a new Ministry of the Navy and the Colonies and appointed an energetic minister, Prosper, Marquis of Chasseloup-Laubat, to head it. A key part of the enterprise was the modernization of the French Navy; he began the construction of 15 powerful new battle cruisers powered by steam and driven by propellers; and a fleet of steam-powered troop transports. The French Navy became the second most powerful in the world, after Britain's. He also created a new force of colonial troops, including elite units of naval infantry, Zouaves, the Chasseurs d'Afrique, and Algerian sharpshooters, and he expanded the Foreign Legion, which had been founded in 1831 and won fame in the Crimea, Italy and Mexico. By the end of Napoleon III's reign, the French overseas territories had tripled in the area; in 1870 they covered a 1,000,000 km^{2} (390,000 sq mi), with more than 5 million inhabitants.

=== Asia (second empire) ===
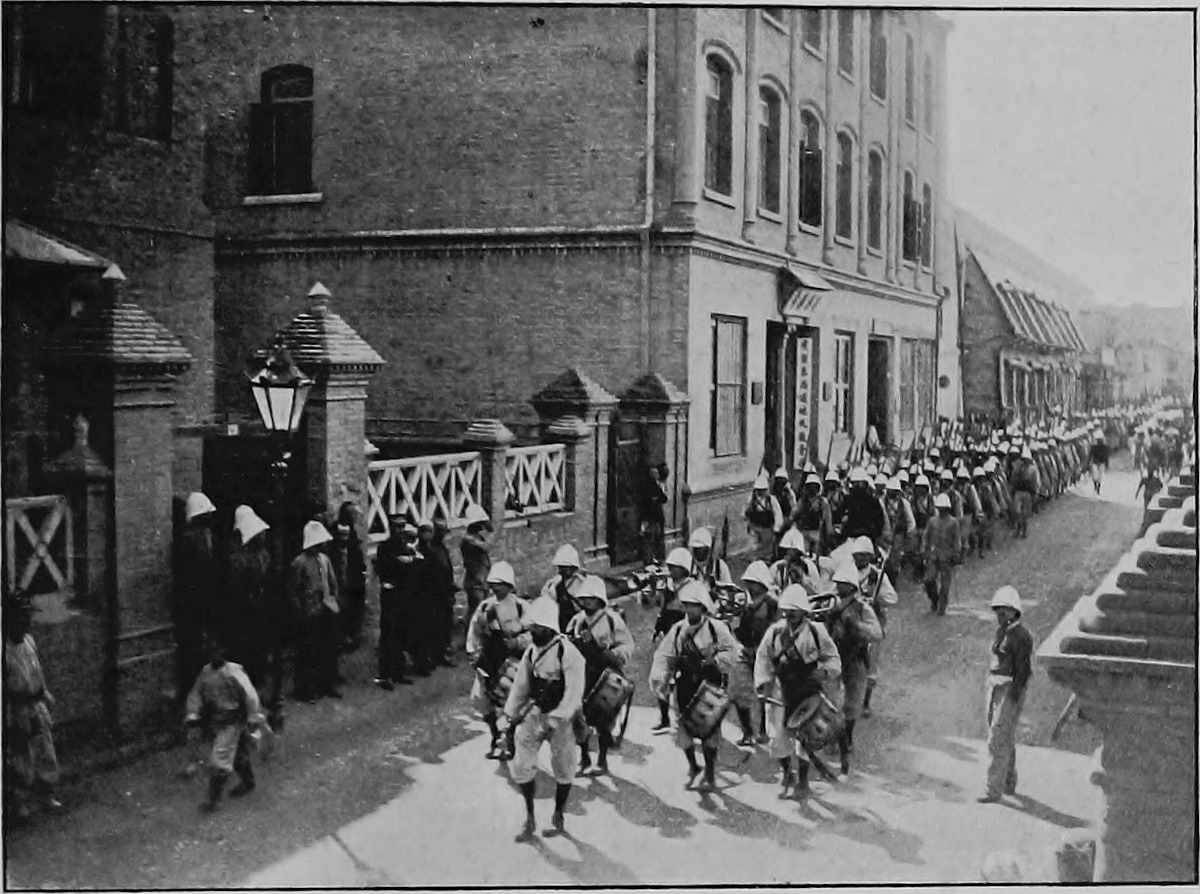
French colonial infantry marching through the French Concession in Tianjin during the Boxer Rebellion

Napoleon III also acted to increase the French presence in Indochina. An important factor in his decision was the belief that France risked becoming a second-rate power by not expanding its influence in East Asia. Deeper down was the sense that France owed the world a civilizing mission.

French missionaries had been active in Vietnam since the mid-17th century with the Paris Foreign Missions Society. In 1858 the Vietnamese emperor of the Nguyen dynasty felt threatened by the French influence and tried to expel the missionaries. Napoleon III sent a naval force of fourteen gunships, carrying three thousand French and three thousand Filipino troops provided by Spain, under Charles Rigault de Genouilly, to compel the government to accept the missionaries and to stop the persecution of Catholics. In September 1858 the expeditionary force captured and occupied the port of Da Nang, and then in February 1859 moved south and captured Saigon. The Vietnamese ruler was compelled to cede three provinces to France, and to offer protection to the Catholics in the Treaty of Saigon (1862). The French troops departed for a time to take part in the expedition to China, but when the agreements were not fully followed by the Vietnamese emperor, they returned. The Emperor was forced to open treaty ports in Annam and Tonkin, and all of Lower Cochinchina became a French territory in 1867.

In 1863, the ruler of Cambodia, King Norodom, who had been placed in power by the government of Thailand, rebelled against his sponsors and sought the protection of France. The Thai king granted authority over Cambodia to France, in exchange for two provinces of Laos, which were ceded by Cambodia to Thailand. In 1867, Cambodia formally became a protectorate of France.

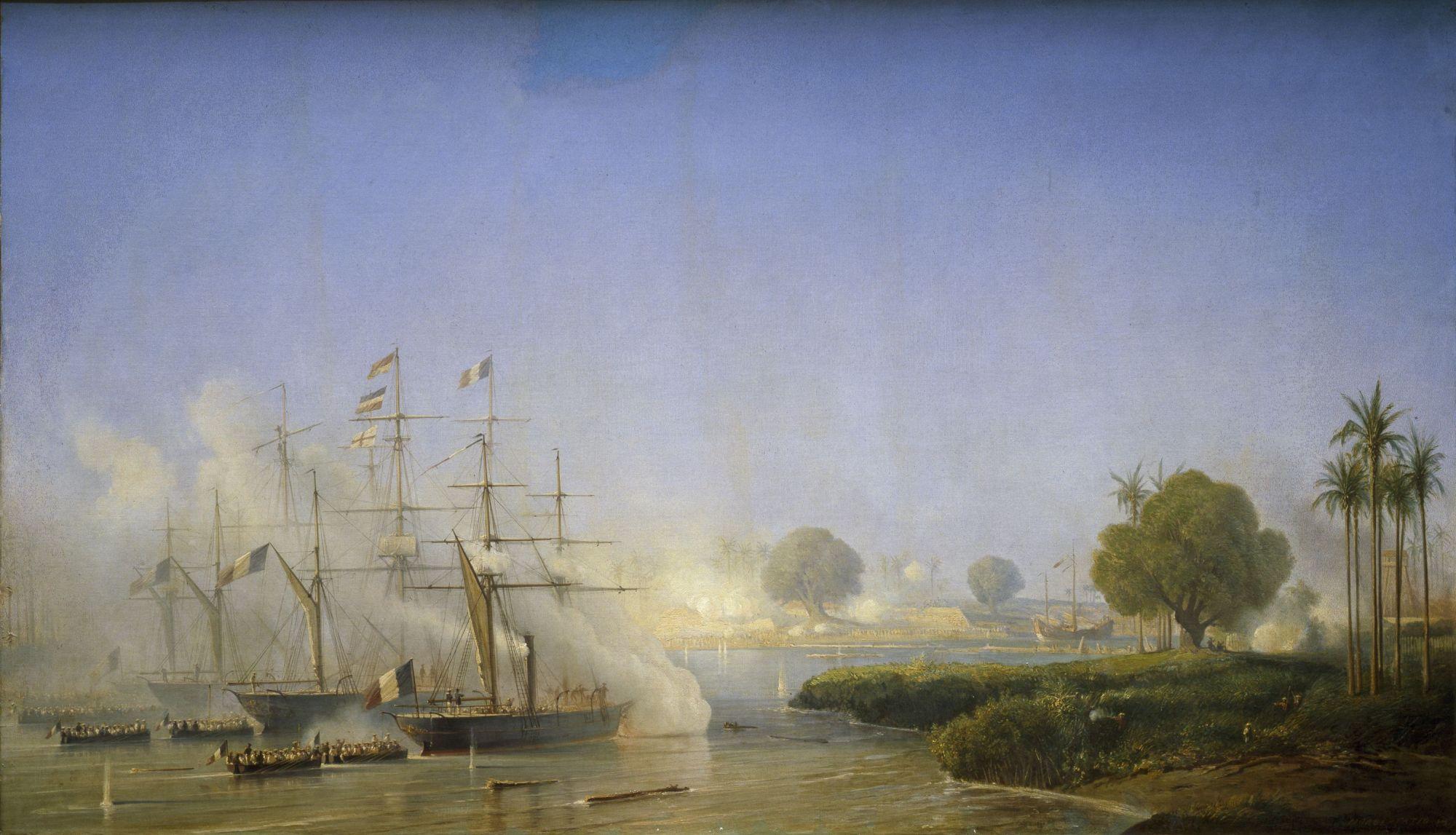
Capture of Saigon by Charles Rigault de Genouilly on 18 February 1859, painted by Antoine Morel-Fatio

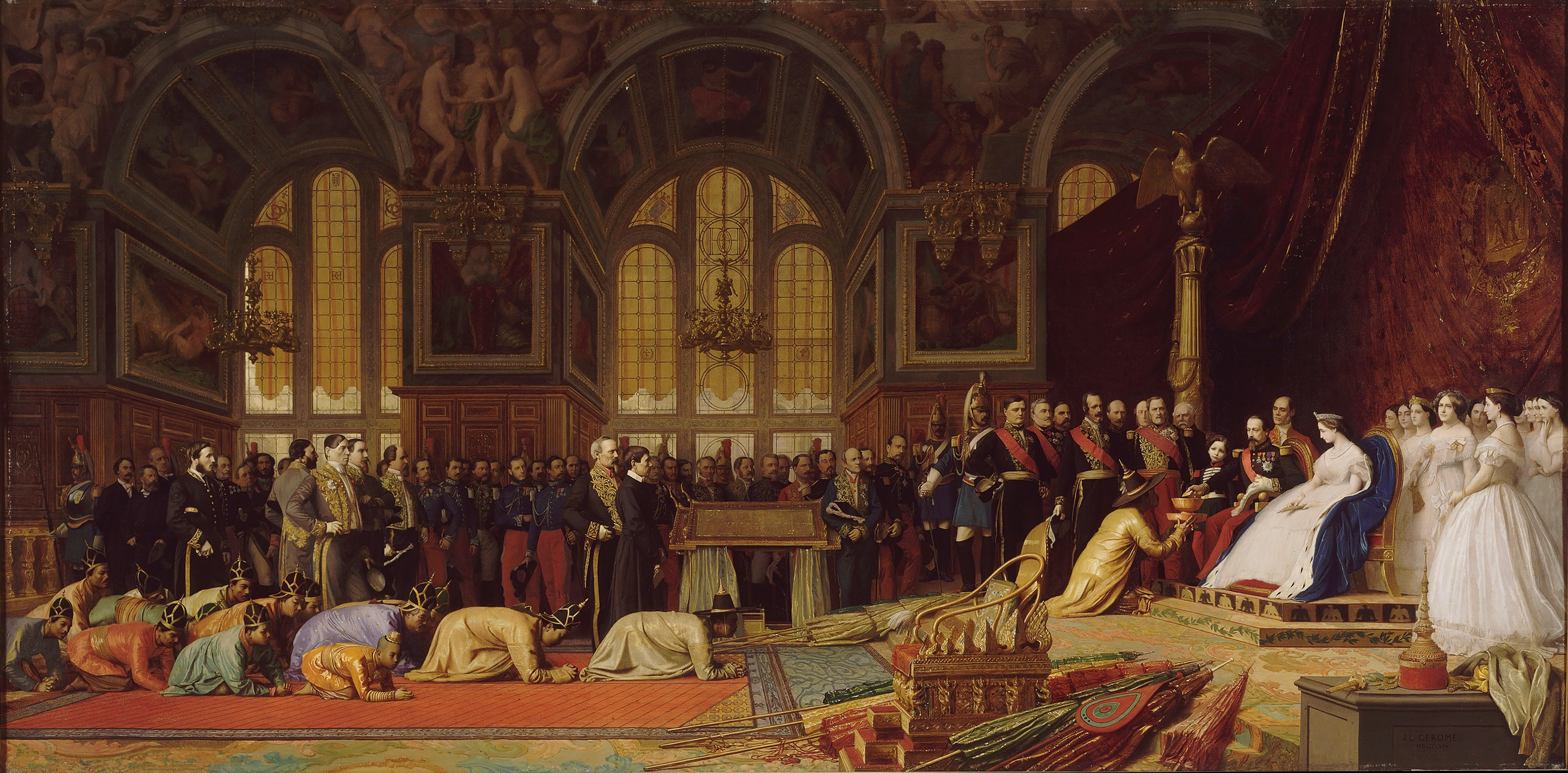
Napoleon III receiving the Siamese embassy at the palace of Fontainebleau in 1864

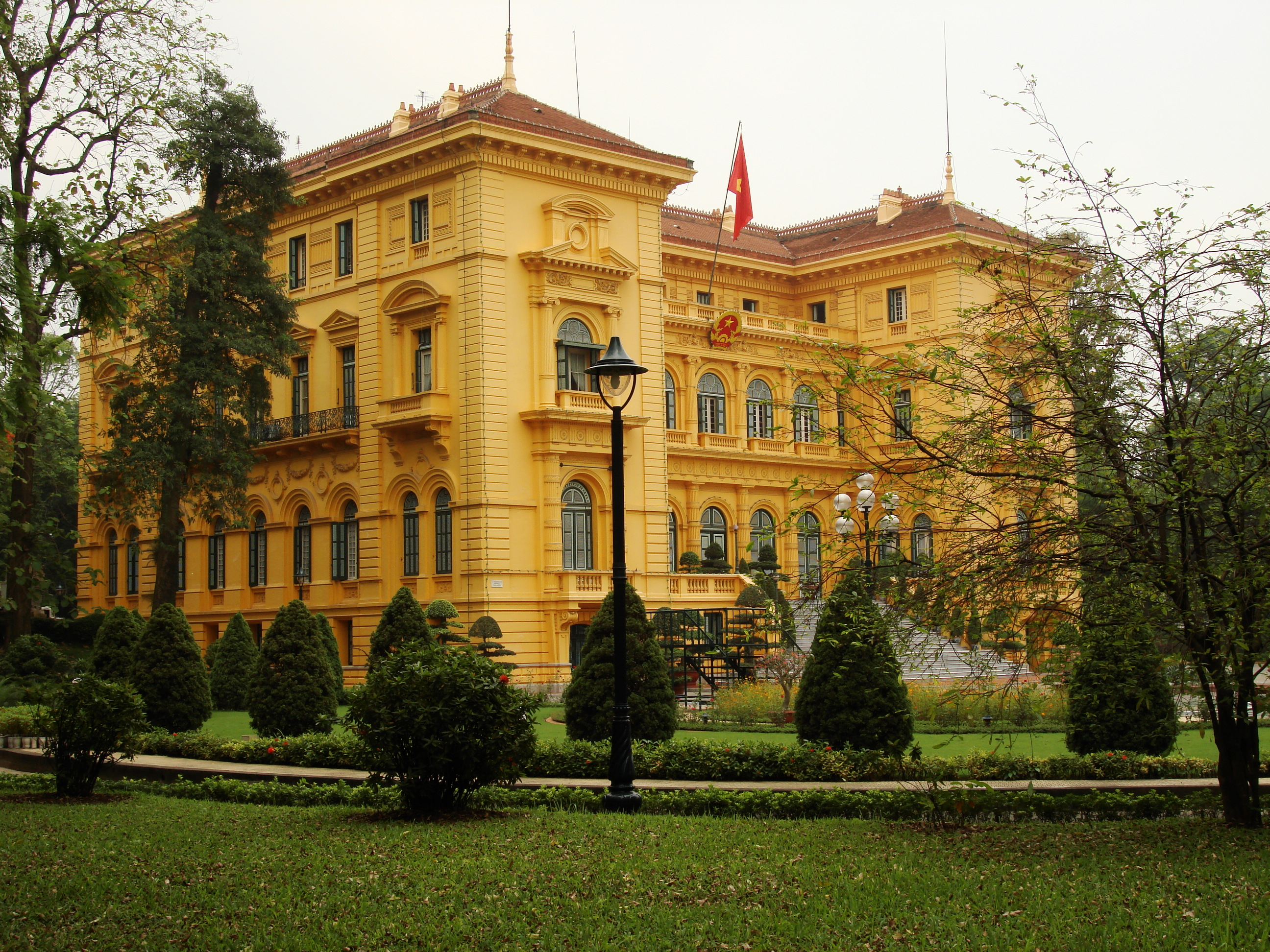
The Presidential Palace of Vietnam in Hanoi was built between 1900 and 1906 to house the French Governor-General of Indochina.

It was only after its defeat in the Franco-Prussian War of 1870–1871 and the founding of the Third Republic (1871–1940) that most of France's later colonial possessions were acquired. From their base in Cochinchina, the French took over Tonkin (in modern northern Vietnam) and Annam (in modern central Vietnam) and made them become French protectorates with the Treaty of Hue between France and Vietnam's Nguyen dynasty in 1883. These, together with Cambodia and Cochinchina, formed French Indochina in 1887 (to which Laos was added in 1893 and Guangzhouwanin 1900).

In 1849, the French Concession in Shanghai was established, and in 1860, the French Concession in Tientsin (now called Tianjin) was set up. Both concessions lasted until 1946. The French also had smaller concessions in Guangzhou and Hankou (now part of Wuhan).

The Third Anglo-Burmese War, in which Britain conquered and annexed the hitherto independent Upper Burma, was in part motivated by British apprehension at France advancing and gaining possession of territories near to Burma.

=== Middle East ===
In the spring of 1860, a war broke out in Lebanon, then part of the Ottoman Empire, between the Druze population and the Maronite Christians. The Ottoman authorities in Lebanon could not stop the violence, and it spread into neighboring Syria, with the massacre of many Christians. In Damascus, the Emir Abd-el-Kadr protected the Christians there against the Muslim rioters. Napoleon III felt obliged to intervene on behalf of the Christians, despite the opposition of London, which feared it would lead to a wider French presence in the Middle East. After long and difficult negotiations to obtain the approval of the British government, Napoleon III sent a French contingent of seven thousand men for a period of six months. The troops arrived in Beirut in August 1860, and took positions in the mountains between the Christian and Muslim communities. Napoleon III organized an international conference in Paris, where the country was placed under the rule of a Christian governor named by the Ottoman Sultan, which restored a fragile peace. The French troops departed in June 1861, after just under one year. The French intervention alarmed the British, but was highly popular with the powerful Catholic political faction in France, which had been alarmed by Louis Napoleon's dispute with the Pope over his territories in Italy.

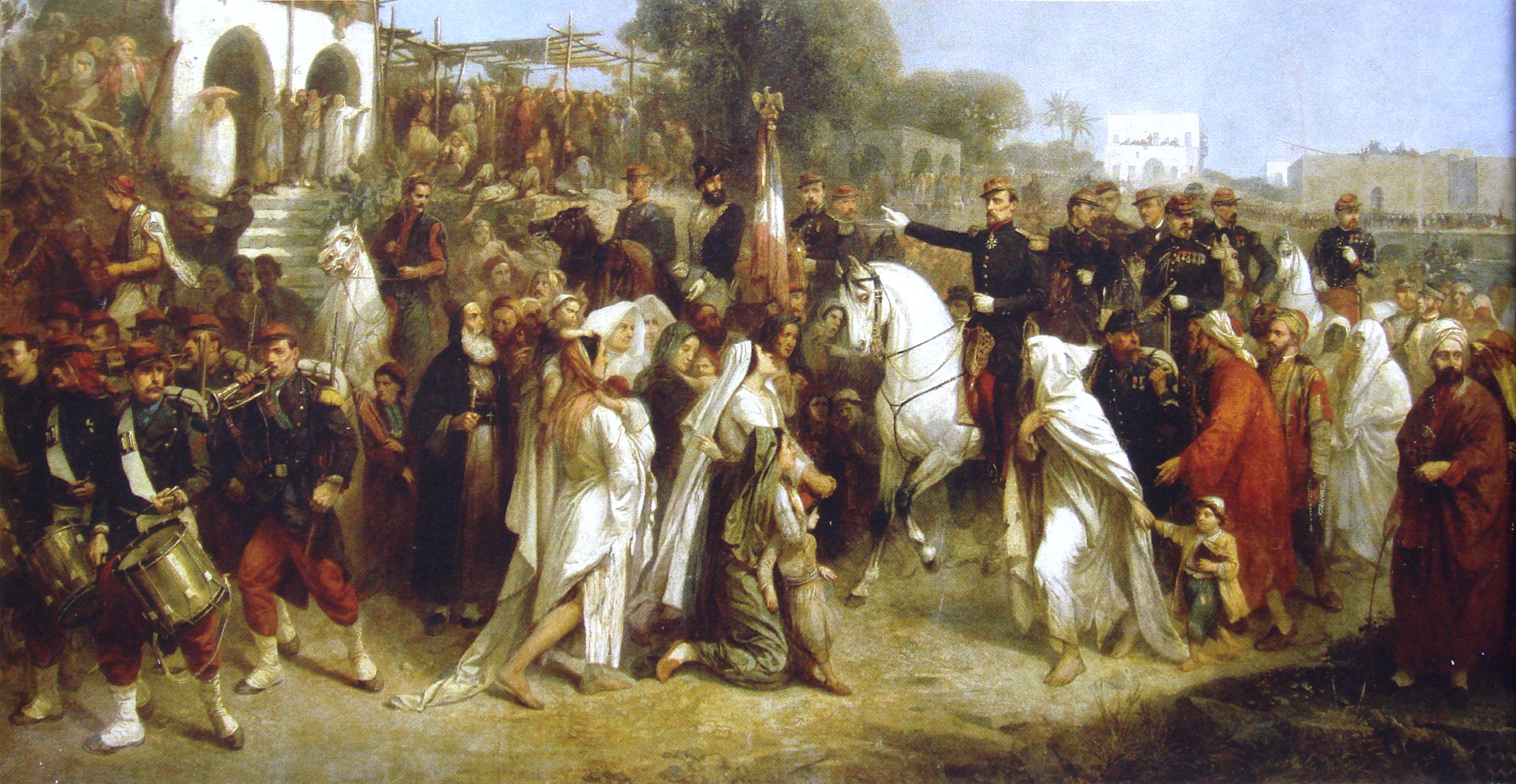
The French expedition in Syria led by General Beaufort d'Hautpoul, landing in Beyrouth on 16 August 1860

Despite the signing of the 1860 Cobden–Chevalier Treaty, a historic free trade agreement between Britain and France, and the joint operations conducted by France and Britain in the Crimea, China and Mexico, diplomatic relations between Britain and France never became close during the colonial era. Lord Palmerston, the British foreign minister from 1846 to 1851 and prime minister from 1855 to 1865, sought to maintain the balance of power in Europe; this rarely involved an alignment with France. In 1859, there were even briefly fears that France might try to invade Britain. Palmerston was suspicious of France's interventions in Lebanon, Southeast Asia, and Mexico. Palmerston was also concerned that France might intervene in the American Civil War (1861–1865) on the side of the South. The British also felt threatened by the construction of the Suez Canal (1859–1869) by Ferdinand de Lesseps in Egypt. They tried to oppose its completion by diplomatic pressures and by promoting revolts among workers.

The Suez Canal was successfully built by a French-backed company, which was to remain under French control even after the British government acquired almost half of the shares. Both nations saw it as vital to maintaining their influence and respective empire in East Africa and Asia. In 1882, ongoing civil disturbances in Egypt prompted Britain to intervene, extending a hand to France. France's leading expansionist Jules Ferry was out of office, and Paris allowed London to take effective control of Egypt.

=== Evolution in the use of the term "empire" between the years of 1870–1939 ===
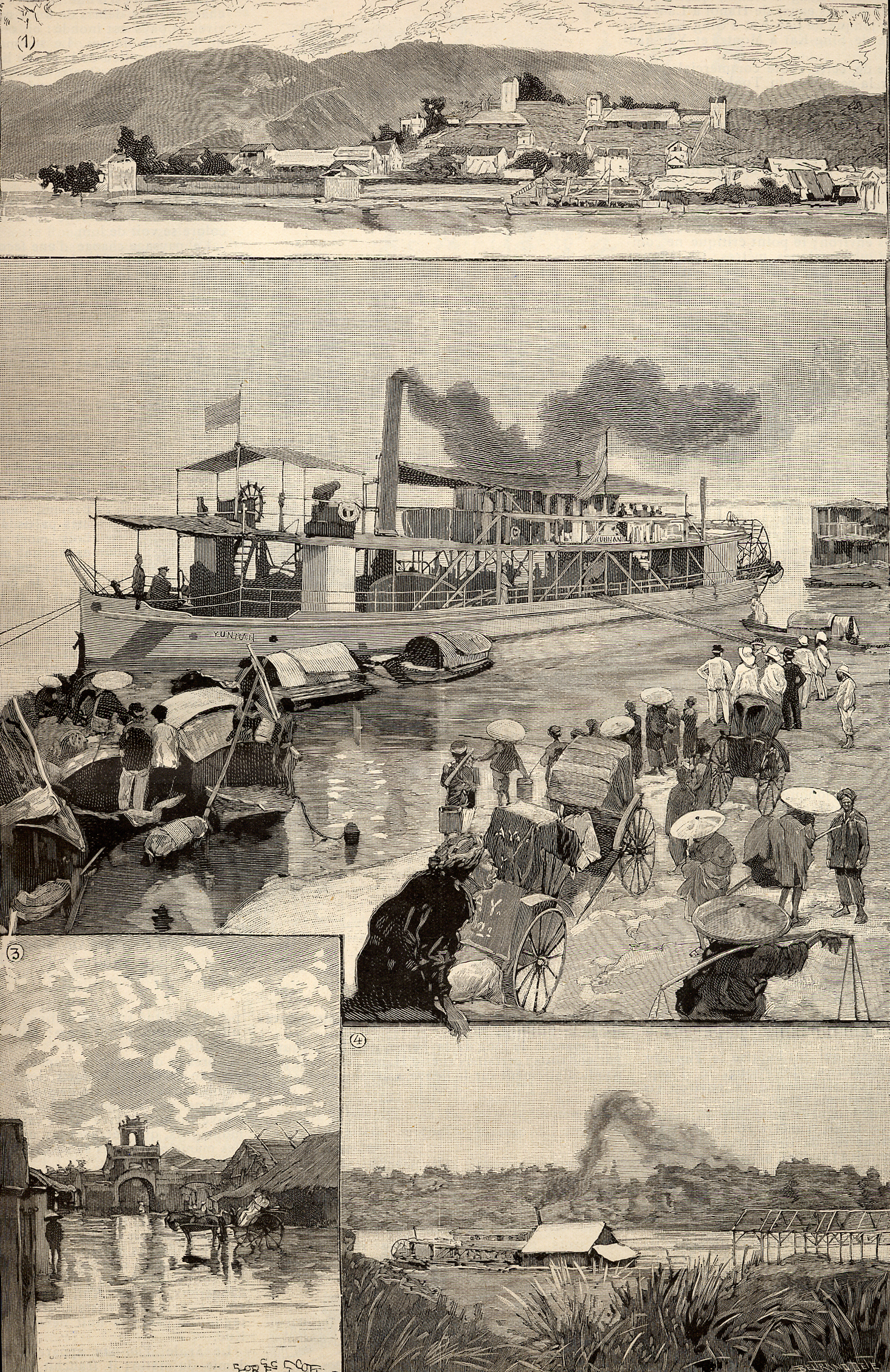
French colonies in 1891 (from Le Monde illustré): 1. Panorama of Lac-Kaï, French outpost in China; 2. Yun-nan, in the quay of Hanoi; 3. Flooded street of Hanoi; 4. Landing stage of Hanoi

After the downfall of Napoleon III, few writers used the word 'empire', which had become associated with despotism, decadence, and weakness, preferring the word 'colonies'. However, by the 1880s and 1890s, as Republicans consolidated their control over the political system, increasing numbers of politicians, intellectuals and writers began using the phrase "colonial empire", linking it to republicanism and the French nation.

Most Frenchmen ignored foreign affairs and colonial issues. In 1914 the chief pressure group was the Parti colonial, a coalition of 50 organizations with a combined total of only 5,000 members.

=== Causes and justifications for colonialism ===
==== Civilizing mission ====
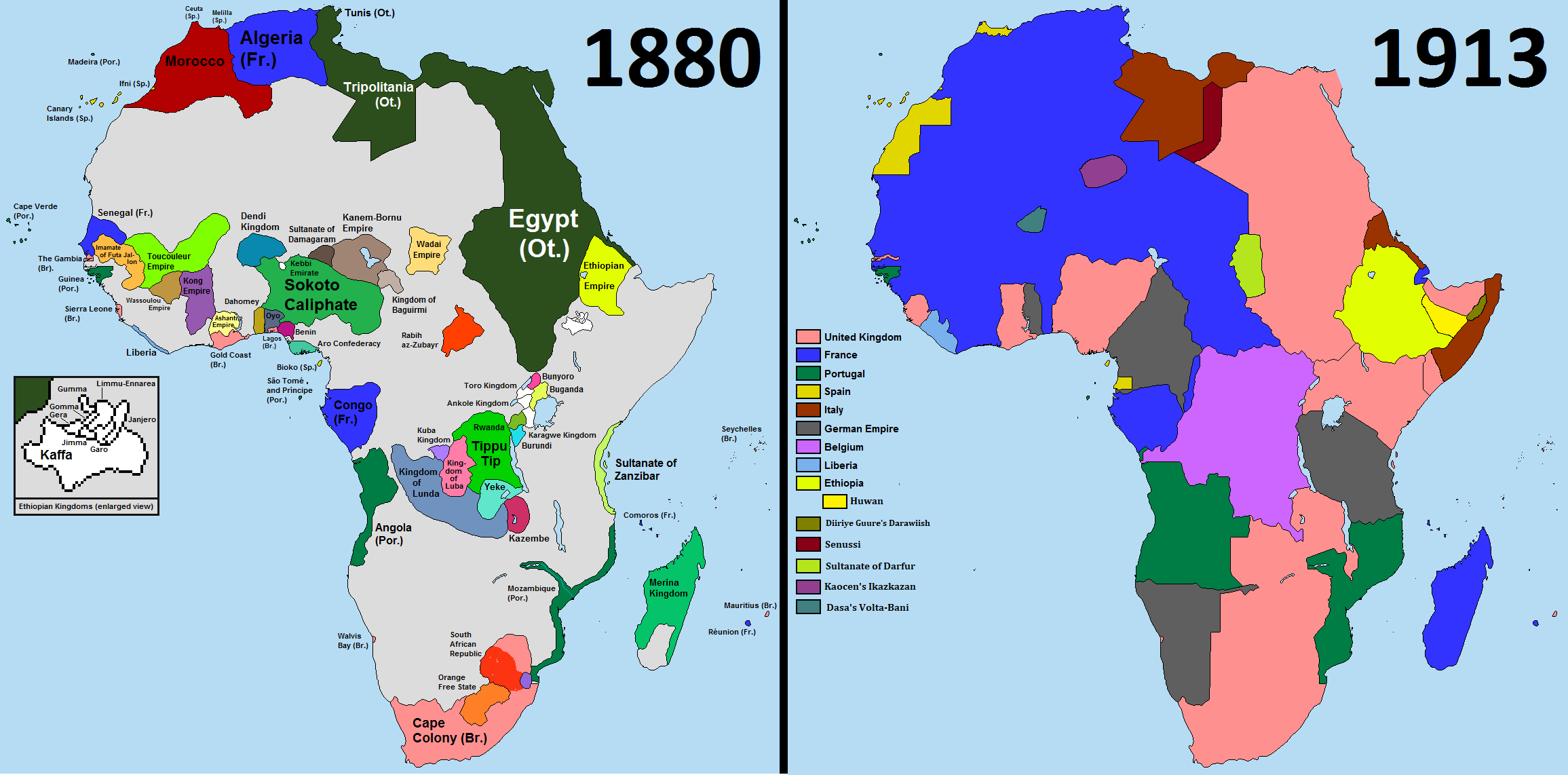
Comparison of Africa in the years 1880 and 1913

The hallmark of the French colonial project in the late 19th century and early 20th century was the civilising mission (mission civilisatrice), the principle that it was Europe's duty to bring civilisation to benighted peoples. As such, colonial officials undertook a policy of Franco-Europeanisation in French colonies, most notably French West Africa and Madagascar. During the 19th century, French citizenship along with the right to elect a deputy to the French Chamber of Deputies was granted to the four old colonies of Guadeloupe, Martinique, Guyanne, and Réunion, as well as to the residents of French India and the "Four Communes" in Senegal. In most cases, the elected deputies were white Frenchmen, although there were some blacks, such as the Senegalese Blaise Diagne, who was elected in 1914.

Racism and notions of white supremacy were integral to justifying the concept of the civilizing mission. French colonialists viewed non-European societies as uncivilized, and their colonial subjects as needing European re-education. Racial darwinists like Arthur de Gobineau, justified this ideology by falsely claiming that people of color were biologically inferior to white people.

Elsewhere, in the largest and most populous colonies, a strict separation between "sujets français" ("French subjects", natives) and "citoyens français" ("French citizens", people of European extraction) with different rights and duties was maintained until 1946. As was pointed out in a 1927 treatise on French colonial law, the granting of French citizenship to natives "was not a right, but rather a privilege". Two 1912 decrees dealing with French West Africa and French Equatorial Africa enumerated the conditions that a native had to meet in order to be granted French citizenship (they included speaking and writing French, earning a decent living and displaying good moral standards). From 1830 to 1946, only between 3,000 and 6,000 Muslim native Algerians were granted French citizenship. In French West Africa, outside of the Four Communes, there were 2,500 "citoyens indigènes" out of a total population of 15 million.

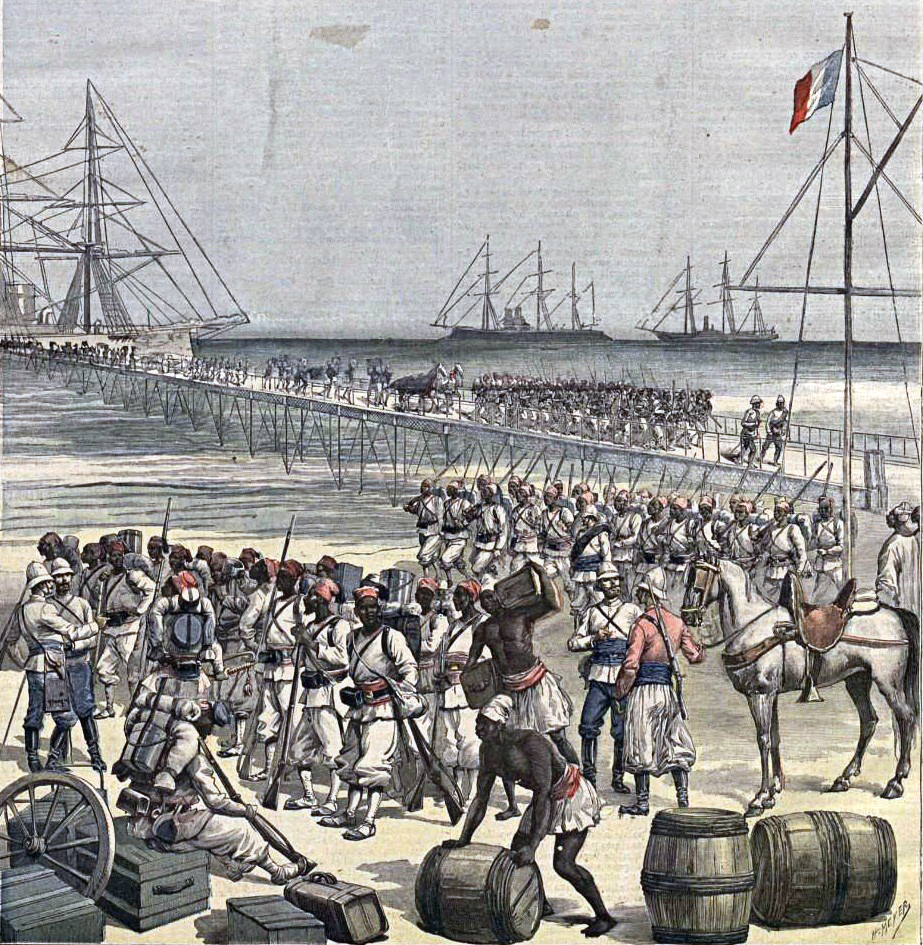
French colonial troops, led by Colonel Alfred-Amédée Dodds, a Senegalese mulatto, conquered and annexed Dahomey in 1894.

French conservatives had been denouncing the assimilationist policies as products of a dangerous liberal fantasy. In the Protectorate of Morocco, the French administration attempted to use urban planning and colonial education to prevent cultural mixing and to uphold the traditional society upon which the French depended for collaboration, with mixed results. After World War II, the segregationist approach modeled in Morocco had been discredited by its connections to Vichyism, and assimilationism enjoyed a brief renaissance.

David P. Forsythe wrote: "From Senegal and Mauritania in the west to Niger in the east (what became French Africa), there was a parallel series of ruinous wars, resulting in tremendous numbers of people being violently enslaved. At the beginning of the twentieth century there may have been between 3 and 3.5 million slaves, representing over 30 percent of the total population, within this sparsely populated region." In 1905, the French abolished slavery in most of French West Africa. From 1906 to 1911, over a million slaves in French West Africa fled from their masters to earlier homes. In Madagascar over 500,000 slaves were freed following French abolition in 1896.

==== Education ====
French colonial officials, influenced by the revolutionary ideal of equality, standardized schools, curricula, and teaching methods as much as possible. They did not establish colonial school systems with the idea of furthering the ambitions of the local people, but rather simply exported the systems and methods in vogue in the mother nation. Having a moderately trained lower bureaucracy was of great use to colonial officials. The emerging French-educated indigenous elite saw little value in educating rural peoples. After 1946 the policy was to bring the best students to Paris for advanced training. The result was to immerse the next generation of leaders in the growing anti-colonial diaspora centered in Paris. Impressionistic colonials could mingle with studious scholars or radical revolutionaries or so everything in between. Ho Chi Minh and other young radicals in Paris formed the French Communist party in 1920.

Tunisia was exceptional. The colony was administered by Paul Cambon, who built an educational system for colonists and indigenous people alike that was closely modeled on mainland France. He emphasized female and vocational education. By independence, the quality of Tunisian education nearly equalled that in France.

African nationalists rejected such a public education system, which they perceived as an attempt to retard African development and maintain colonial superiority. One of the first demands of the emerging nationalist movement after World War II was the introduction of full metropolitan-style education in French West Africa with its promise of equality with Europeans.

In Algeria, the debate was polarized. The French set up schools based on the scientific method and French culture. The pieds-noirs (Catholic migrants from Europe) welcomed this. Those goals were rejected by the Moslem Arabs, who prized mental agility and their distinctive religious tradition. The Arabs refused to become patriotic and a unified educational system became impossible until the pieds-noirs and their Arab allies went into exile after 1962.

=== Critics of French colonialism ===
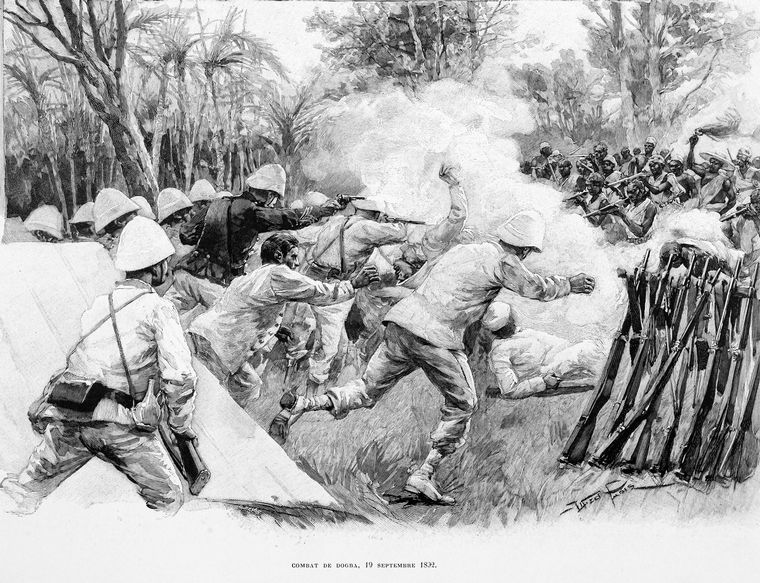
The Second Franco-Dahomean War in 1892–1894

Critics of French colonialism gained an international audience in the 1920s, and often used documentary reportage and access to agencies such as the League of Nations and the International Labour Organization to make their protests heard. The main criticism was the high level of violence and suffering among the natives. Major critics included Albert Londres, Félicien Challaye, and Paul Monet, whose books and articles were widely read.

== Decolonization ==
The French colonial empire began to fall during the Second World War, when various parts were occupied by foreign powers (Japan in Indochina, Britain in Syria, Lebanon, and Madagascar, the United States and Britain in Morocco and Algeria, and Germany and Italy in Tunisia). However, control was gradually reestablished by Charles de Gaulle. The French Union, included in the Constitution of 1946, nominally replaced the former colonial empire, but officials in Paris remained in full control. The colonies were given local assemblies with only limited local power and budgets. There emerged a group of elites, known as "evolués", who were natives of the overseas territories but lived in metropolitan France.

=== World War II ===
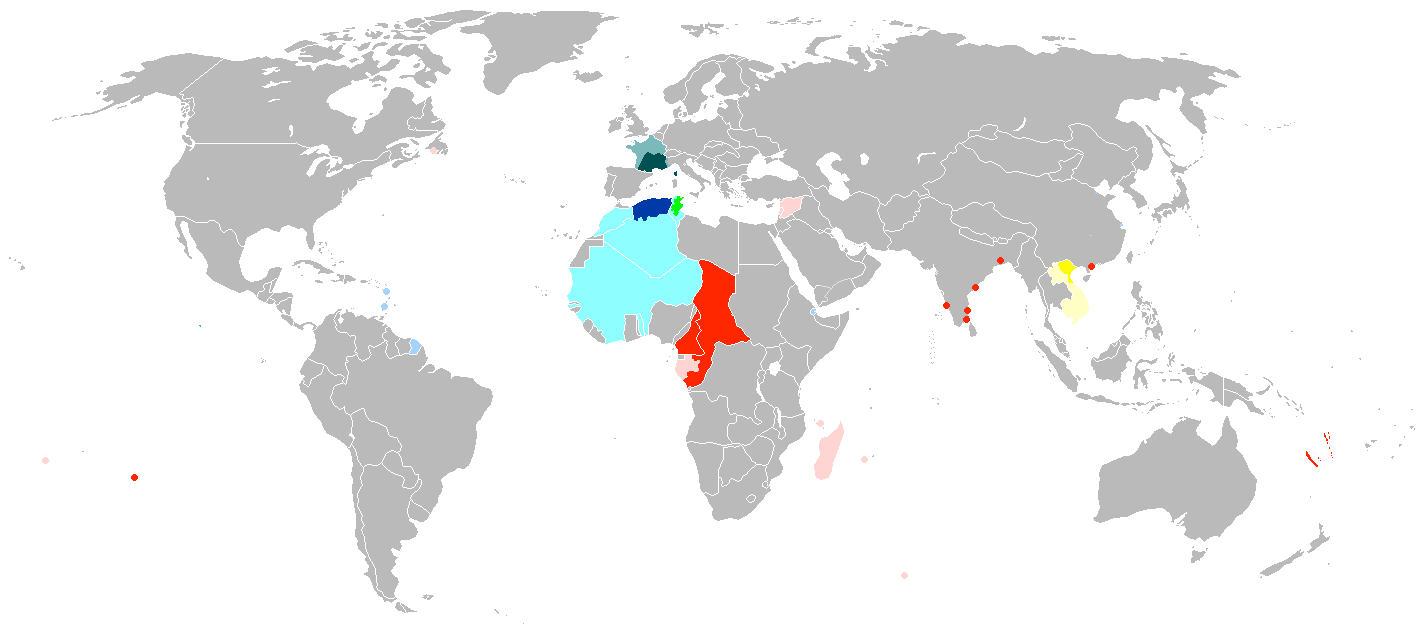
The gradual loss of all Vichy territory to Free France and the Allies by 1943. Legend.

During World War II, allied Free France, often with British support, and Axis-aligned Vichy France struggled for control of the colonies, sometimes with outright military combat. By 1943, all of the colonies, except for Indochina under Japanese control, had joined the Free French cause.

The overseas empire helped liberate France as 300,000 North African Arabs fought in the ranks of the Free French. However Charles de Gaulle had no intention of liberating the colonies. He assembled the conference of colonial governors (excluding the nationalist leaders) in Brazzaville in January 1944 to announce plans for postwar Union that would replace the Empire. The Brazzaville manifesto proclaimed:

the goals of the work of civilization undertaken by France in the colonies exclude all idea of autonomy, all possibility of development outside the French block of the Empire; the possible constitutional self-government in the colonies is to be dismissed.

The manifesto angered nationalists across the Empire, and set the stage for long-term wars in Indochina and Algeria that France would lose in humiliating fashion.

=== Conflict ===
France was immediately confronted with the beginnings of the decolonisation movement. In Algeria demonstrations in May 1945 were repressed with an estimated 6,000 to 45,000 Algerians killed. Paul Ramadier's (SFIO) cabinet repressed the Malagasy Uprising in Madagascar in 1947. The French blamed education. French officials estimated the number of Malagasy killed from a low of 11,000 to a French Army estimate of 89,000.

The French returned to reassert control over Indochina, beginning with the War in southern Vietnam (1945–1946). The communist-led Viet Minh under Ho Chi Minh proclaimed the Democratic Republic of Vietnam; meanwhile its Indochinese Communist Party leadership was primarily responsible for initiating the civil conflicts in Vietnam (1945–1949). Unrest in Haiphong, Indochina, in November 1946 was met by a warship bombarding the city. The First Indochina War broke out in December 1946. From 1950 onward, the Viet Minh was backed by China and the Soviet Union, while the anti-communist State of Vietnam was supported by the United States. The war dragged on until 1954, when the Viet Minh decisively defeated the French at the Battle of Điện Biên Phủ in northern Vietnam, which was the last major battle between the French and the Vietnamese in the First Indochina War.

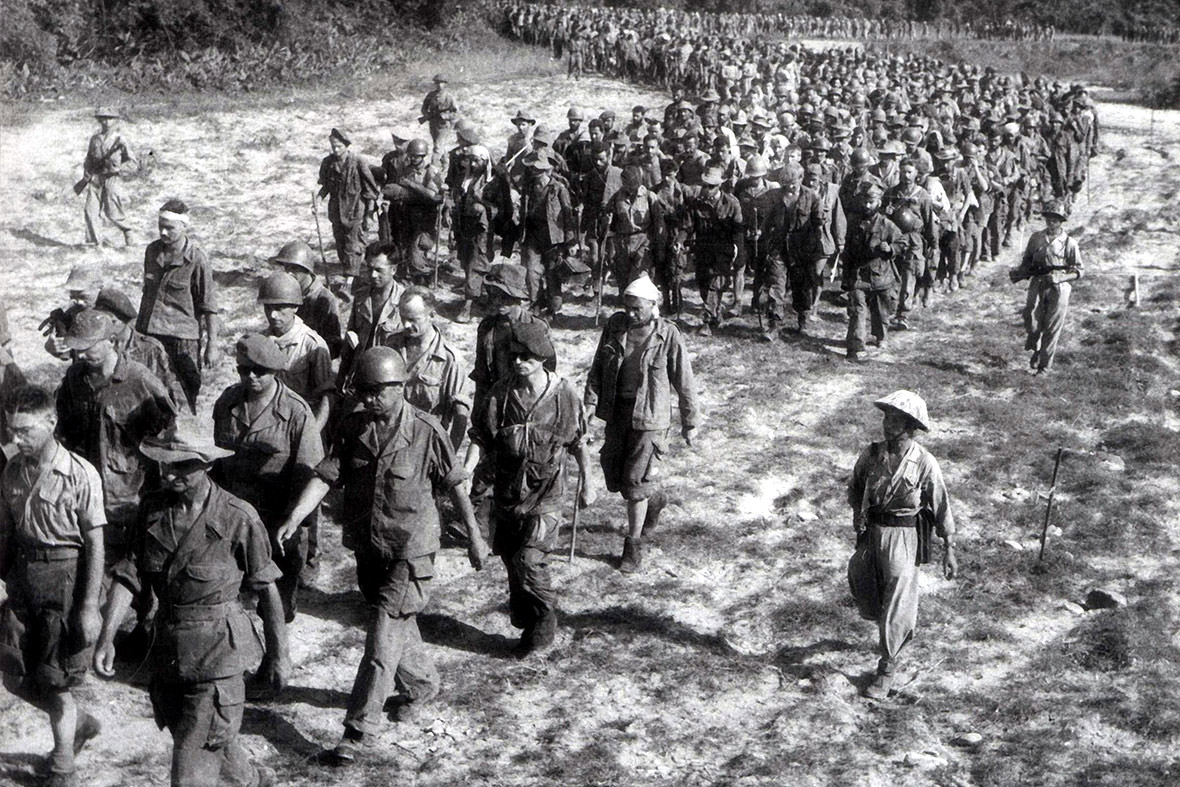
Captured French soldiers from Dien Bien Phu, escorted by Vietnamese troops, walk to a prisoner-of-war camp.

Following the signing of the 1954 Geneva Accords with the Viet Minh, France agreed to withdraw its forces, while the accords stipulated that Vietnam would be temporarily divided at the 17th parallel, with control of the north given to the Democratic Republic of Vietnam under Ho Chi Minh and the south to the State of Vietnam under Bảo Đại. In October 1955, the State of Vietnam's Prime Minister, Ngo Dinh Diem, toppled Bảo Đại in a fraud-ridden referendum and proclaimed himself president of the new Republic of Vietnam. Worsening relations between the communist North Vietnam and anti-communist South Vietnam would eventually lead to the Vietnam War.

In France's African colonies, the Union of the Peoples of Cameroon's insurrection, which started in 1955 and headed by Ruben Um Nyobé, was violently repressed over a two-year period, with perhaps as many as 100 people killed. However, France formally relinquished its protectorate over Tunisia and Morocco and granted them independence in 1956.

French involvement in Algeria stretched back a century. The movements of Ferhat Abbas and Messali Hadj had marked the period between the two world wars, but both sides radicalised after the Second World War. In 1945, the Sétif massacre was carried out by the French army. The Algerian War started in 1954. Atrocities characterized both sides, and the number killed became highly controversial estimates that were made for propaganda purposes. Algeria was a three-way conflict due to the large number of "pieds-noirs" (Europeans who had settled there in the 125 years of French rule). The political crisis in France caused the collapse of the Fourth Republic, as Charles de Gaulle returned to power in 1958 and finally pulled the French soldiers and settlers out of Algeria by 1962.

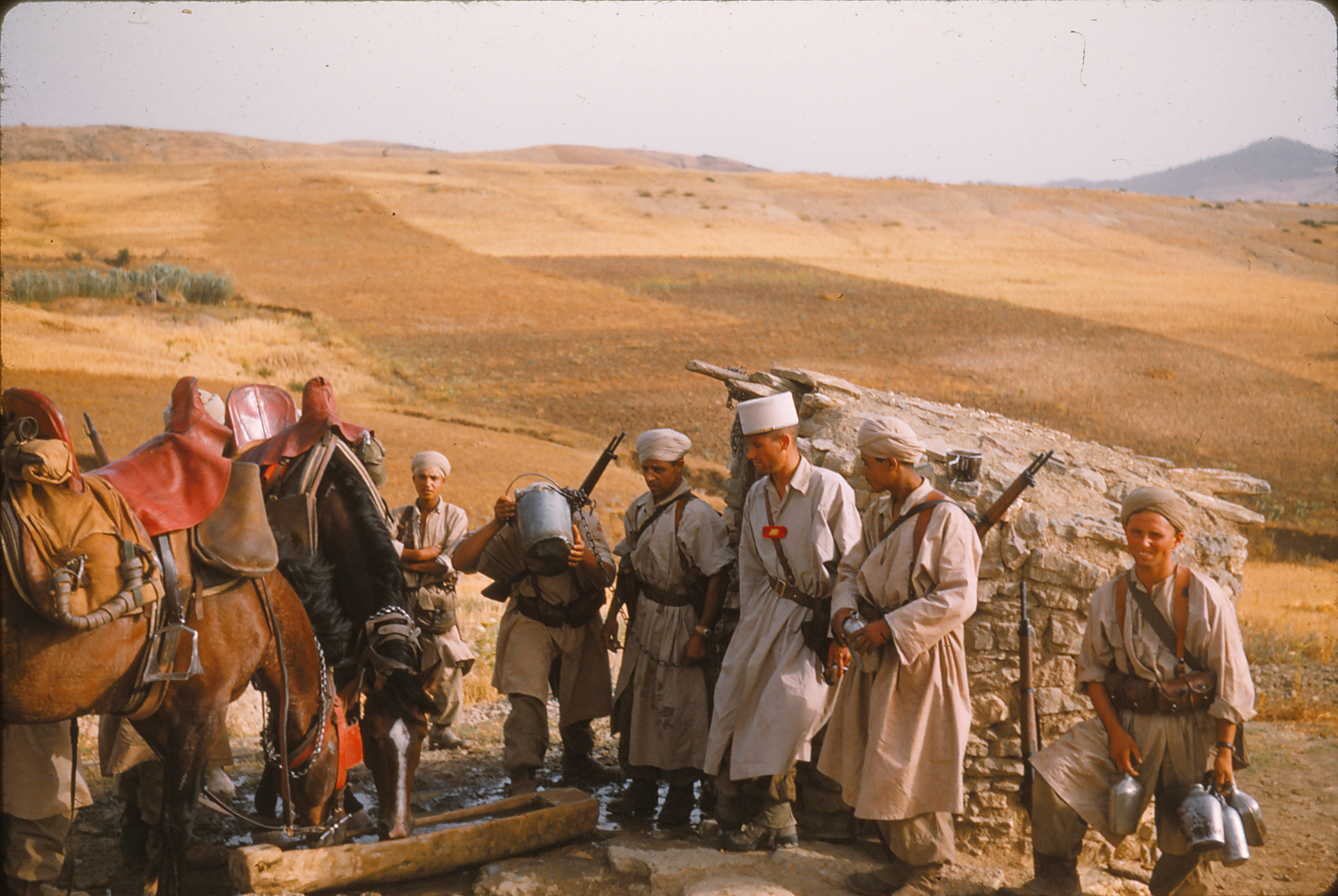
French officer and native Spahi during the Algerian War in the 1950s

The French Union was replaced in the Constitution of 1958 by the French Community. Only Guinea refused by referendum to take part in the new organisation. However, the French Community ceased to operate before the end of the Algerian War. Almost all of the other former African colonies achieved independence in 1960. The French government refused to allow the populations of the former colonies the right they had in the new French Constitution of 1958, as French citizens with equal rights, to choose for their territories to become full départements of France. The French government had ensured that a constitutional law (60-525) was passed which removed the need for a referendum in a territory to confirm a change in status towards independence or départementalisation, so the voters who had rejected independence in 1958 were not consulted about it in 1960. There are still a few former colonies that chose to remain part of France, under the status of overseas départements or territories.

Critics of neocolonialism claimed that the Françafrique had replaced formal direct rule. They argued that while de Gaulle was granting independence on one hand, he was maintaining French dominance through the operations of Jacques Foccart, his counsellor for African matters. Foccart supported in particular Biafra in the Nigerian Civil War during the late 1960s.

Robert Aldrich argues that with Algerian independence in 1962, it appeared that the Empire practically had come to an end, as the remaining colonies were quite small and lacked active nationalist movements. However, there was trouble in French Somaliland (Djibouti), which became independent in 1977. There also were complications and delays in the New Hebrides Vanuatu, which was the last to gain independence in 1980. New Caledonia remains a special case under French suzerainty. The Indian Ocean island of Mayotte voted in referendum in 1974 to retain its link with France and not become independent like the other three islands of the Comoro archipelago.

== Demographics ==
French census statistics from 1936 show an imperial population, outside of Metropolitan France itself, of 69.1 million people. Of the total population, 16.1 million lived in North Africa, 25.5 million in sub-Saharan Africa, 3.2 million in the Middle East, 0.3 million in the Indian subcontinent, 23.2 million in East and South-East Asia, 0.15 million in the South Pacific, and 0.6 million in the Caribbean.

The largest colonies were the general governorate of French Indochina (consisting of four protectorates and one colony), with 23.0 million, the general governorate of French West Africa (grouping eight separate colonies), with 14.9 million, the general governorate of Algeria (grouping three departments and four Saharan territories), with 7.2 million, the protectorate of Morocco, with 6.3 million, the general governorate of French Equatorial Africa (grouping four separate colonies), with 3.9 million, and Madagascar and Dependencies (incl. the Comoro Islands), with 3.8 million.

In 1936, 2.7 million Europeans (French and non-French citizens) and assimilated natives (non-European French citizens) lived in the French colonial empire, besides 66.4 million non-assimilated natives (French subjects but not citizens). The majority of Europeans lived in North Africa. Non-European French citizens lived essentially in the four "old colonies" (Réunion, Martinique, Guadeloupe, and French Guiana), as well as in the Four Communes of Senegal (Saint-Louis, Dakar, Gorée, and Rufisque) and in the colonies of the South Pacific.

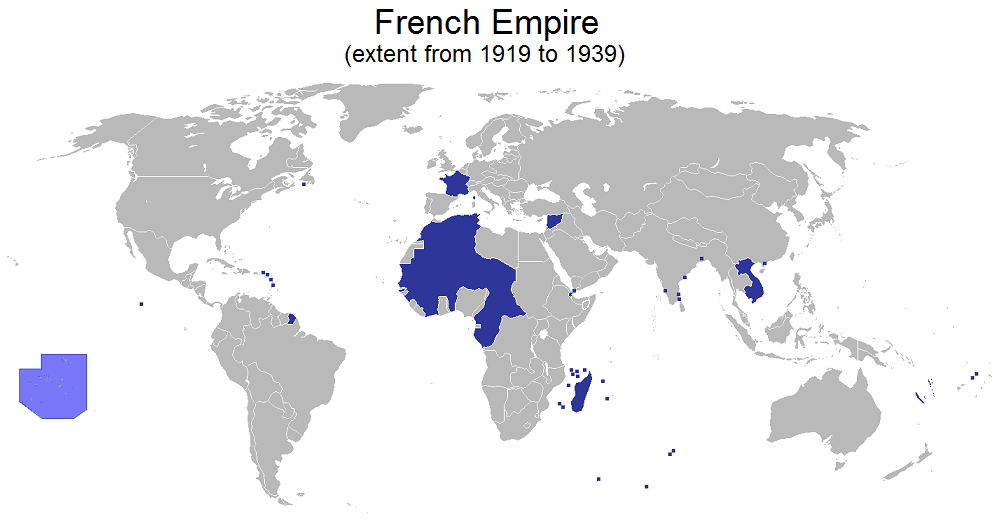
Population of the French Empire between 1919 and 1939
	1921	1926	1931	1936
Metropolitan France	39,140,000	40,710,000	41,550,000	41,500,000
Colonies, protectorates, and mandates	55,556,000	59,474,000	64,293,000	69,131,000
Total	94,696,000	100,184,000	105,843,000	110,631,000
Percentage of the world population	5.02%	5.01%	5.11%	5.15%
Sources: INSEE, SGF

=== French settlers ===
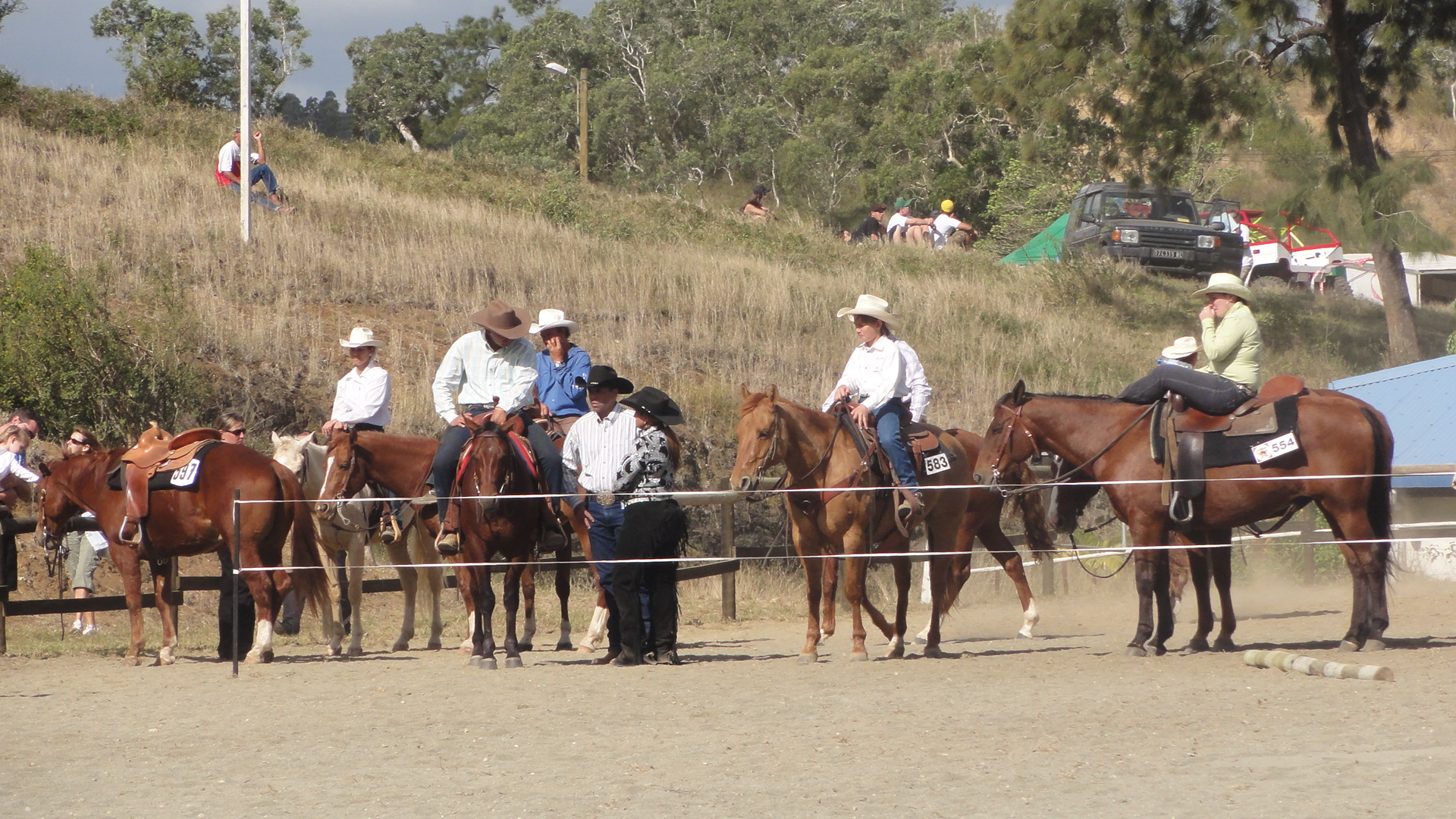
Caldoches, French people born in New Caledonia

Unlike elsewhere in Europe, France experienced relatively low levels of emigration to the Americas, except for the Huguenots in British or Dutch colonies. France generally had close to the slowest natural population growth in Europe, and emigration pressures were therefore quite small. A small but significant emigration, numbering only in the tens of thousands, of mainly Roman Catholic French populations led to the settlement of the provinces of Acadia, Canada, and Louisiana, both (at the time) French possessions, and colonies in the West Indies, Mascarene islands and Africa. In New France, Huguenots were banned from settling in the territory, and Quebec was one of the most staunchly Catholic areas in the world until the Quiet Revolution. The current French Canadian population, which numbers in the millions, is descended almost entirely from New France's small settler population.

On 31 December 1687 a community of French Huguenots settled in South Africa. Most of these originally settled in the Cape Colony, but have since been quickly absorbed into the Afrikaner population. After Champlain's founding of Quebec City in 1608, it became the capital of New France. Encouraging settlement was difficult, and while some immigration did occur, by 1763 New France only had a population of some 65,000.

In 1787, there were 30,000 white colonists on France's colony of Saint-Domingue. In 1804 Dessalines, the first ruler of an independent Haiti (St. Domingue), ordered the massacre of whites remaining on the island. Out of the 40,000 inhabitants on Guadeloupe, at the end of the 17th century, there were more than 26,000 blacks and 9,000 whites. Bill Marshall wrote, "The first French effort to colonize Guiana, in 1763, failed utterly when tropical diseases and climate killed all but 2,000 of the initial 12,000 settlers."

French law made it easy for thousands of colons, ethnic or national French from former colonies of North and West Africa, India and Indochina, to live in mainland France. It is estimated that 20,000 colons were living in Saigon in 1945, while 1.6 million European pieds noirs migrated from Algeria, Tunisia and Morocco. In just a few months in 1962, 900,000 French Algerians left Algeria in the largest relocation of population in Europe since World War II. In the 1970s, over 30,000 French colons left Cambodia during the Khmer Rouge regime as the Pol Pot government confiscated their farms and land properties. In November 2004, several thousand of the estimated 14,000 French nationals in Ivory Coast left the country after days of anti-white violence.

Apart from French-Canadians (Québécois and Acadians), francophone Louisianians (Cajuns and Louisiana Creoles), and Métis, other populations of French ancestry outside metropolitan France include the Caldoches of New Caledonia, the so-called Zoreilles, Petits-blancs with the Franco-Mauritian of various Indian Ocean islands, and the Beke people of the French West Indies.

=== Religion ===
Religions practiced in the empire included Catholicism, Islam, Judaism, Louisiana Voodoo, Haitian Vodou, Buddhism, Hinduism, among others. The intense anti-clericalism that accompanied the rise of the secular and colonialist Third Republic culminated in the separation of Church and state in France in 1905. In the World War I, the temporary rapprochement between Church and state in metropolitan France did not extend to the rest of the colonial empire. French colonial authorities grew frustrated with the Vatican's commitment to the indigenization of the non-European Catholic Church and its support for native clergy.

== Territories ==
=== Territories in Africa ===
Map of the colonies in French West Africa in 1935

- French Algeria (1830–1961)
- French Military Territory in Libya (1943–1951)
- French protectorate in Morocco (1912–1956)
- French protectorate of Tunisia (1881–1956)
- French West Africa (1895–1958)
  - French Mauritania (1958–1960)
  - French Senegal (1958–1960)
  - French Guinea (1958–1960)
  - French Ivory Coast (1958–1960)
  - French Niger (1958–1960)
  - French Upper Volta (1958–1960)
  - French Dahomey (1958–1960)
  - French Togoland (1958–1960)
  - French Sudan (1959–1960)
- French Equatorial Africa (1910–1958)
  - French Gabon (1958–1960)
  - French Congo (1958–1960)
  - Ubangi-Shari (1958–1960)
  - French Chad (1958–1960)
- French Cameroon (1920–1960)
- French Madagascar (1897–1958)
  - Seychelles (1756–1794)
  - Isle de France (Mauritius) (1715–1810)
  - Comoros (1841–1975)
  - Mayotte (1843–)
  - Réunion (1665–)
  - Kerguelen Islands (1924–)
  - Île Saint-Paul (1924–)
  - Île Amsterdam (1924–)
  - Crozet Islands (1772–)
  - Bassas da India (1897–)
  - Europa Island (1897 )
  - Juan de Nova Island (1897–)
  - Glorioso Islands (1892–)
  - Tromelin (1722–)
- French Somaliland (1896–1967)
- French domains of Saint Helena (1854–)

=== Territories in Asia ===
- French mandate of Syria (1923–1946)
- Greater Lebanon (1923–1943)
- French India (1673–1950)
- French Indochina (1887–1954; interrupted in 1945)
  - French Cochinchina (1862–1949)
  - Tonkin (1883–1949)
  - Annam (1883–1949)
  - French protectorate of Cambodia (1863–1953)
  - French protectorate of Laos (1893–1953)
  - Siam
    - Chanthaburi (1893–1905)
    - Dan Sai (1893–1907)
    - Trat (1893–1907)
  - Leased territory of Guangzhouwan (1898–1945)
- China concessions
  - French concession of Hankou (1896–1943)
  - French concession in Tianjin (1896–1943)
  - Shanghai French Concession (1896–1943)
  - Shamian Island, Guangzhou (1896–1943)

=== Territories in the Caribbean ===
- Antigue (1666–1667)
- Dominique (1690–1763), (1778–1783)
- Grenade (1649–1763)
- Guadeloupe (1635–)
- Hispaniola
  - Saint-Domingue (1697–1804)
  - French Santo Domingo (1795–1815)
- Martinique (1635–)
- Montserrat (1666), (1712), (1782–1783)
- Saint Barthélemy (1878–)
- Saint-Eustache (1629), (1648–1667), (1781–1784), (1795–1801)
- Saint Kitts and Nevis
  - Saint-Christophe (1628–1690), (1698–1702), (1706), (1782–1783)
  - Niévès (1782–1784)
- Sainte-Lucie (1650–1723), (1756–1778), (1784–1803)
- Saint-Martin (1648–)
- Saint Vincent and the Grenadines
  - Saint-Vincent (1719–1763), (1779–1783)
  - Grenadines (1740–1763)
- Tabago (1666–1667), (1781–1793), (1782–1784)
- Virgin Islands
  - Saint Croix (1664–1733)
  - Vieques (1698–1811)

=== Territories in South America ===
- Saint-Alexis (1531)
- France Antarctique (1555–1567)
  - Fort Coligny (1555–1560)
  - Henriville (1556–1565)
- Maison de Pierre (1556–1573)
- French Guiana (1503–)
- Equinoctial France (1612–1615)
- Îles Malouines (1504), (1701), (1764–1767)
- Île Delphine (1705–1737)

=== Territories in North America ===
- New France (1534–1763)
  - Acadia (1604–1763)
    - Acadie continentale (Continental Acadia) (1604–1763)
      - Gaspésie (1672–1763)
    - Acadie péninsulaire (Peninsular Acadia) (1605–1713)
      - Sagadahoc (1613–1713)
    - Île-Royale (1713–1763)
      - Île Sainte-Croix (1604–1713), (1713–1763)
      - Île-Royale (1629–1713), (1713–1763)
      - Magdalen Islands (1660–1713), (1713–1763)
      - Isle Saint-Jean (1720–1763)
  - Canada (1535–1763)
    - Pays d'en Haut (Upper Country) (1610–1763)
      - Vallée de la rivière Rouge (Red River Valley) (1734–1763)
    - Domaine du roy (King's Domain) (1652–1763)
    - Illinois Country (1675–1722)
    - Baie du Nord (Hudson's Bay) (1686–1713)
    - Labrador (1710-1763)
    - Vallée de la rivière Belle (Ohio River Valley) (1753–1763)
  - Louisiana (1682–1762), (1801–1803)
    - Texas (1684–1689)
    - Illinois Country (1722–1763), (1801–1803)
      - Vallée de la rivière Ouabache (Wabash Valley) (1723–1763)
  - Terre-Neuve (1658–1713)
    - French Shore (1713–1904)
    - Saint Pierre and Miquelon (1536–)
- Florida (1562–1565)
  - Charlesfort (1562–1563)
  - Fort Caroline (1564–1565)

=== Territories in Oceania ===
- New Caledonia (1853–)
- New Zealand (1840–1849)
- French Polynesia (1842–)
  - Windward Islands
  - Leeward Islands
  - Marquesas Islands
  - Austral Islands
  - Tuamotu-Gambier
- Wallis and Futuna (1887–)
- Clipperton Island (1858–)
- New Hebrides (1887–1980)

=== Territories in Antarctica ===
- Adélie Land (1840–)

== See also ==
- Army of the Levant
- CFA franc
- Colonialism
- Decolonization
- Evolution of the French Empire
- Francization
- French Army units with a tradition of service overseas
  - 1900–1958: Troupes de marine
  - 1900–1958: Troupes coloniales
  - Spahis
  - Tirailleurs
  - Zouaves
- French colonial flags
- French colonisation of the Americas
- French law on colonialism (for teachers, 2005)
- History of France
  - Kingdom of France
  - Second French Empire
  - French Third Republic
- International relations (1814–1919)
- List of French possessions and colonies
- Organisation internationale de la Francophonie
- Overseas France
- Postage stamps of the French colonies
- Timeline of imperialism
