= Independence referendum =

Referendum to decide whether a territory should become an independent country

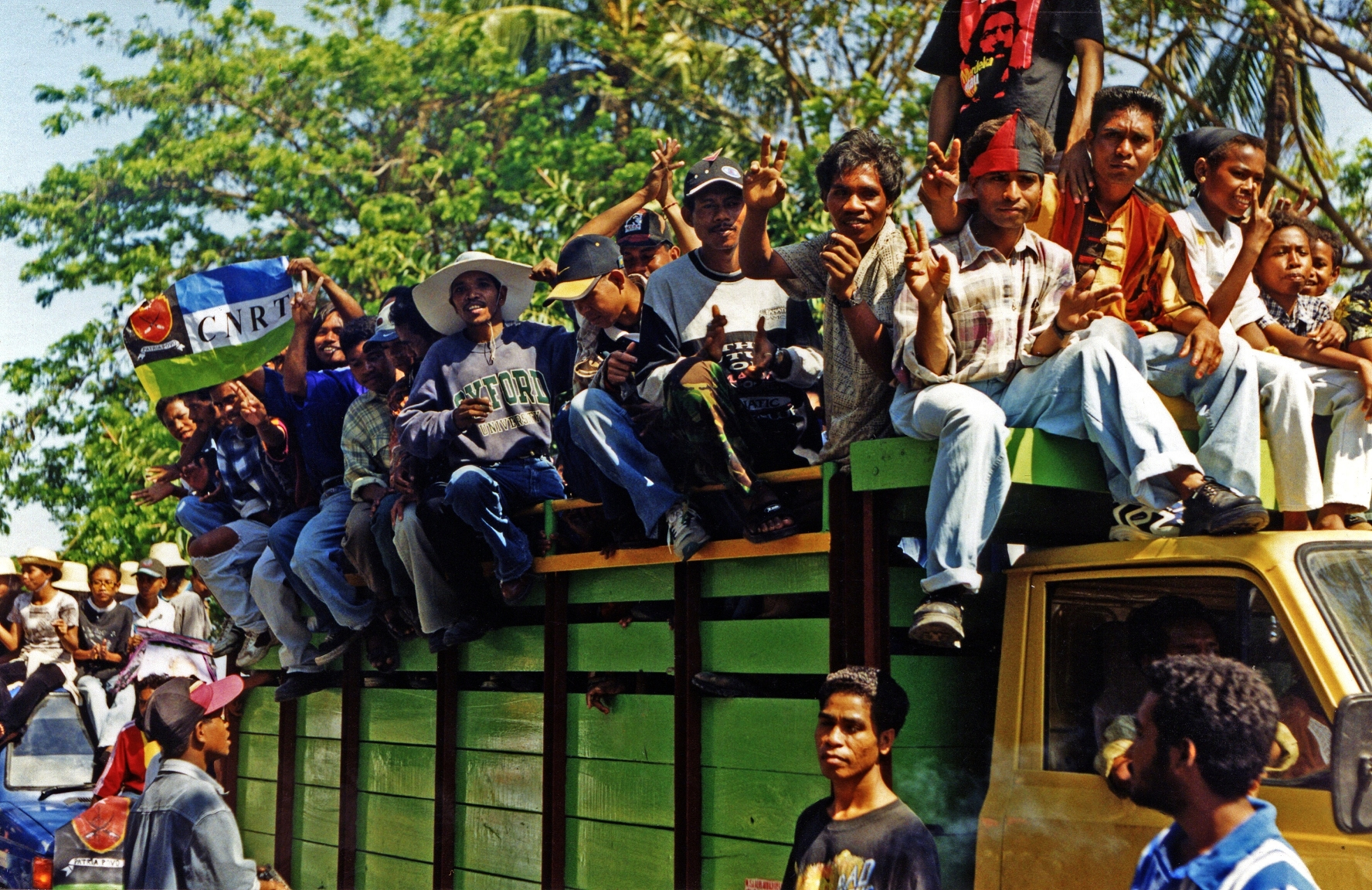
Supporters of the 1999 East Timorese independence referendum in a truck

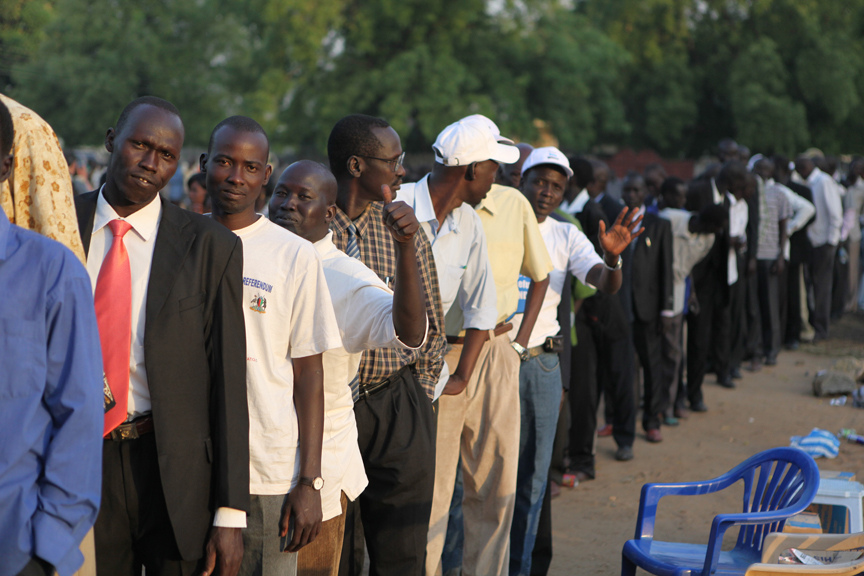
Line of voters in the 2011 South Sudanese independence referendum

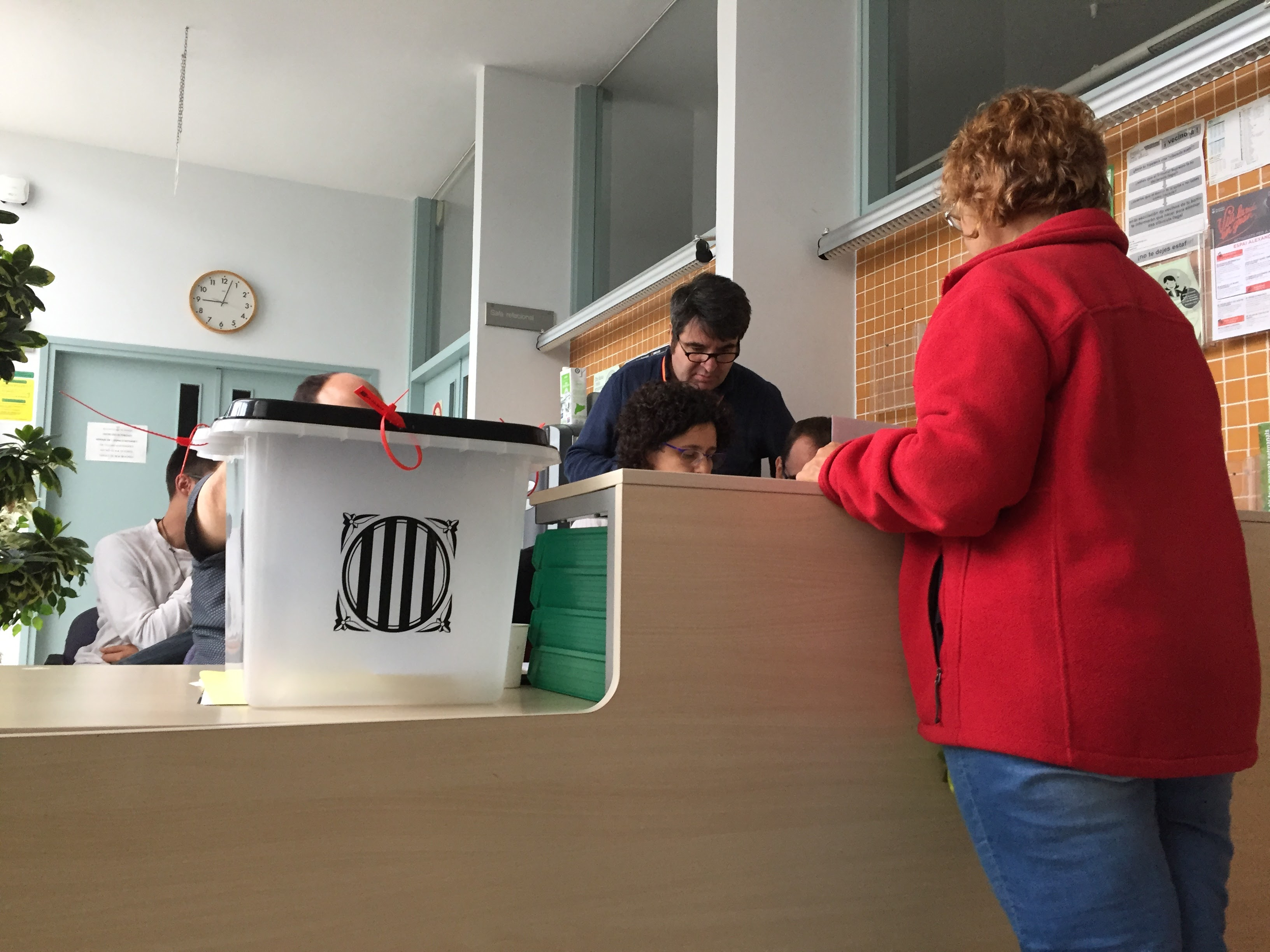
A person voting in the 2017 Catalan independence referendum

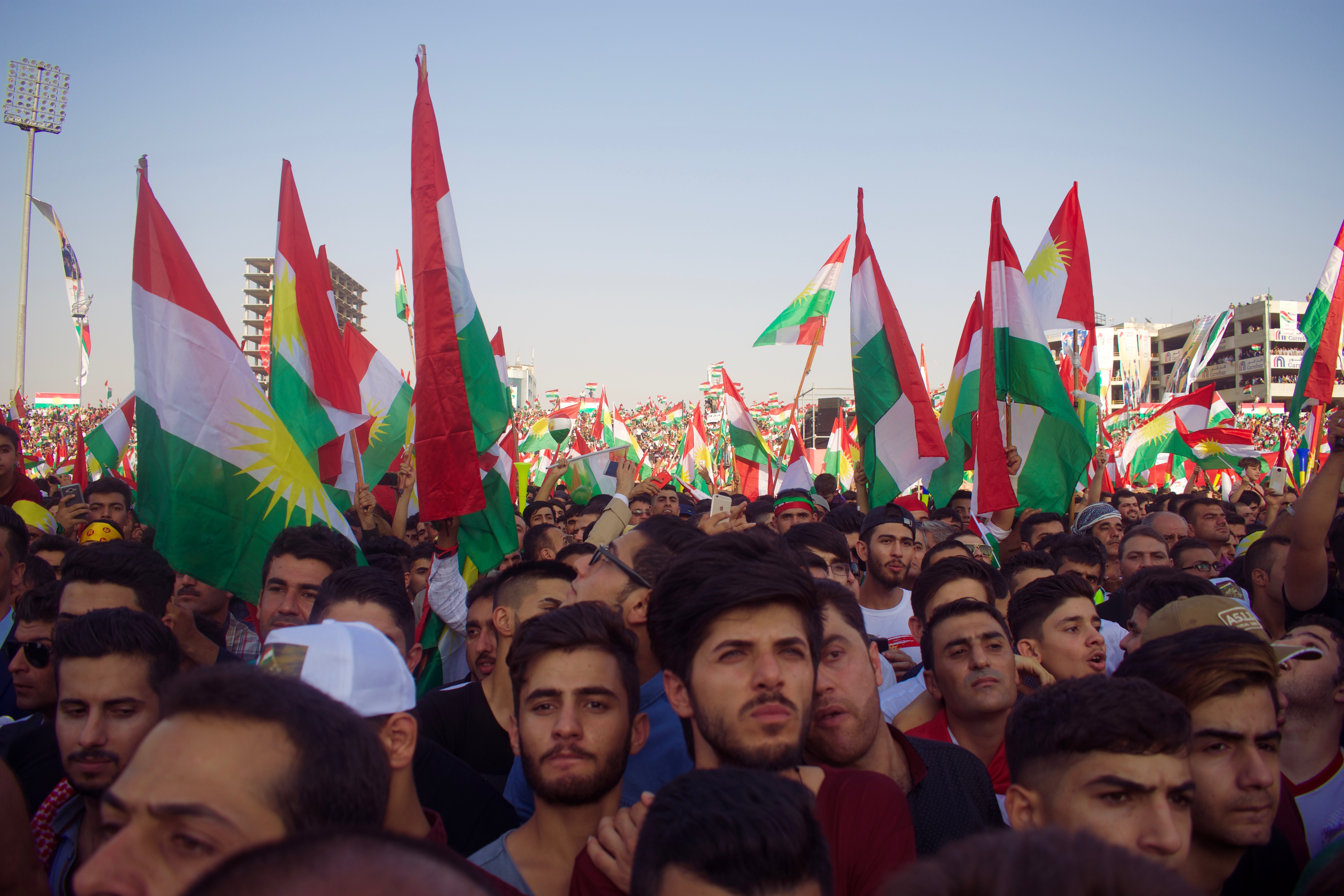
A rally supporting the 2017 Kurdistan Region independence referendum

An independence referendum is a type of referendum in which the residents of a territory decide whether the territory should become an independent sovereign state. An independence referendum that results in a vote for independence does not always ultimately result in independence.

== Procedure ==
An independence referendum typically arises first after political success for nationalists of a territory. This could come in the election of politicians or parties with separatist policies, or from pressure from nationalist organisations.

=== Negotiations ===
Negotiations for the terms of an independence referendum may take place between the nationalists and the government which exercises sovereignty over the territory. If terms can be agreed, then the independence referendum can be held with its result binding, and respected by the international community. Independence referendums can be held without the consent of a national or the federal governments, then the international community will rely on several other factors, e.g. were the local people oppressed by the central government or not, to decide if the result can be recognized or not.

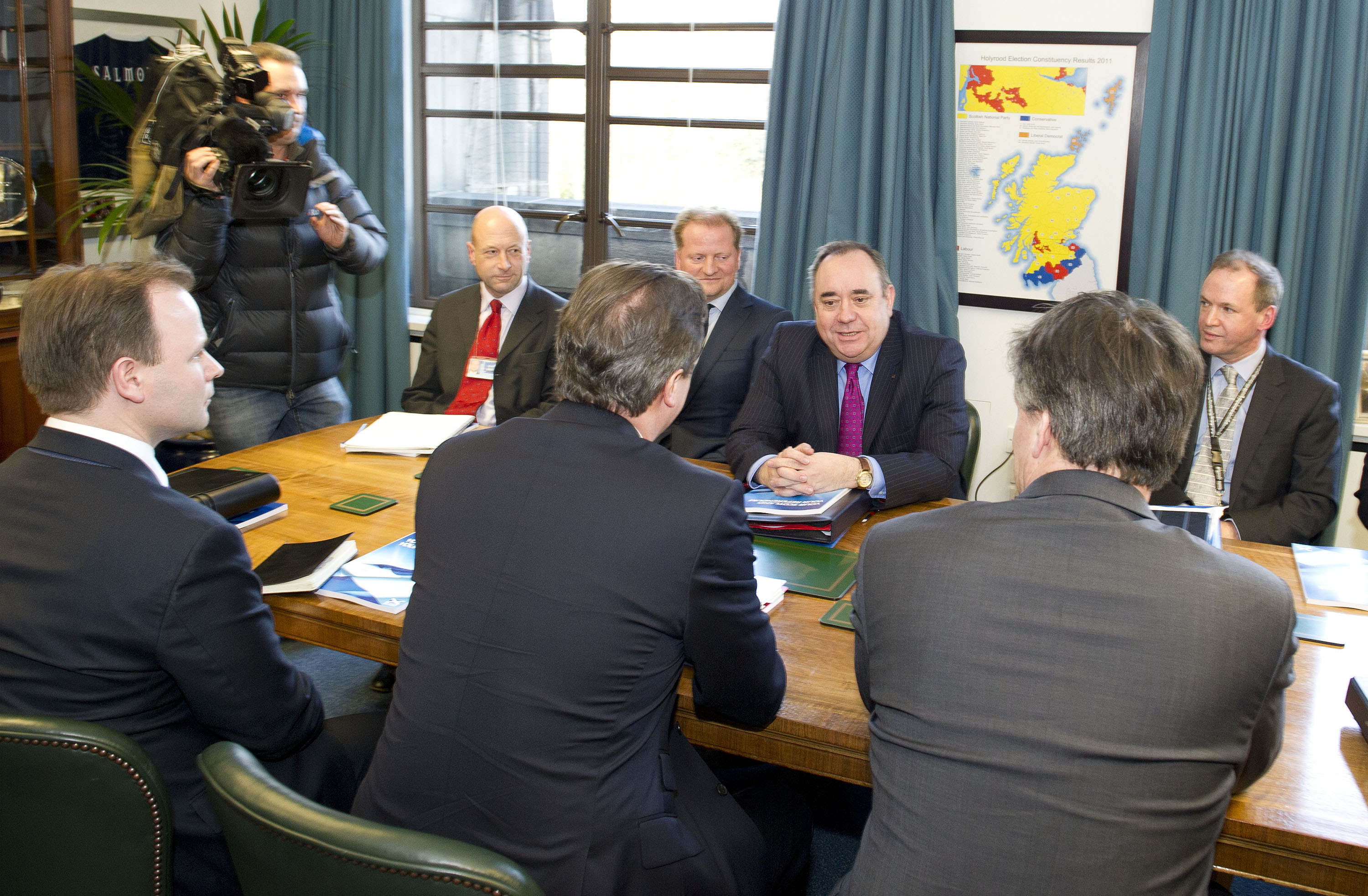
Scottish Government and UK government delegates discussing the 2014 Scottish independence referendum.

Various issues can be discussed in negotiations, such as the date and timing of the poll, as well as voter eligibility. For these instances, common electoral practice is often widely used, although there can be deviations, as seen with the lowering of the voting age for the 2014 Scottish independence referendum.

Other issues to be negotiated include what question or questions should be on the ballot, and what the voting options could be. Independence referendums can offer options of greater autonomy as well as, or instead of, the status quo. They can also put forward other constitutional questions to ballot. The questions that referendums ask may be revised if parties involved in negotiations consider them to be too leading.

Negotiations notably need to address what would make a result binding. For some independence referendums, a simple majority is required for one option. In other cases, a quota can be used, where a certain percentage of the vote or the electorate needs to be in favour of an option for it to be binding.

Successful negotiations can be hard to achieve for nationalists, as governments can be reluctant to give up sovereignty. For example, nationalists planned to hold a referendum in Catalonia in 2014, but met opposition from the Spanish government. As a result, the referendum that went ahead was unofficial and non-binding.

=== Aftermath ===
In the event of a vote for independence, there may be negotiations on the terms of secession for the territory from the sovereign state. A declaration of independence for a new state is then made, and international recognition can follow, as well as membership of international organisations such as the United Nations. In cases involving non-binding referendums, this can lead to a unilateral declaration of independence, and therefore partially recognised or self-proclaimed states, like the Donbas status referendums.

In the event of a vote against independence, there may still be a strong nationalist movement and calls for there to be a rerun of the independence referendum. For example, after two referendums in Quebec, the Parti Québécois has continued to raise the prospect of holding another referendum, and the Scottish National Party has said that there should be a repeat of the 2014 referendum now that the United Kingdom has left the European Union.

== List of independence referendums ==
Proposed state	Year	Proposed independence from	Majority for independence	Independence	Recognition of result	Notes
Chile	1817	Spain	Yes	Yes	No	Unilaterally declared independence.
Liberia	1846	American Colonization Society	Yes	Yes	Yes	
Republic of Maryland	1853	Maryland State Colonization Society	Yes	Yes	Yes	
Norway	1905	Sweden–Norway	Yes	Yes	Yes	
Iceland	1918	Denmark	Yes	Yes	Yes	
Western Australia	1933	Australia	Yes	No	No	
Cambodia	1945	France	Yes	Yes	Yes	
Mongolia	1945	China	Yes	Yes	Yes	Initially recognized by the Republic of China, but recognition was abolished in 1953; recognized by the People's Republic of China.
Faroe Islands	1946	Denmark	Yes	No	No	Independence declaration annulled by Denmark.
Newfoundland	1948	United Kingdom	No	No	Yes	Integrated with Canada.
Nagaland	1951	India	Yes	No	No	Unrecognized by the government of India.
Saar	1955	France	No	No	Yes	Integrated with West Germany.
Cameroon	1958	France	No	No	Yes	Referendum on a new French constitution. A no vote would have led to independence.
Central African Republic	1958	France	No	No	Yes	Referendum on a new French constitution. A no vote would have led to independence.
Chad	1958	France	No	No	Yes	Referendum on a new French constitution. A no vote would have led to independence.
Comoros	1958	France	No	No	Yes	Referendum on a new French constitution. A no vote would have led to independence.
Congo	1958	France	No	No	Yes	Referendum on a new French constitution. A no vote would have led to independence.
Dahomey	1958	France	No	No	Yes	Referendum on a new French constitution. A no vote would have led to independence.
Djibouti	1958	France	No	No	Yes	Referendum on a new French constitution. A no vote would have led to independence.
French Polynesia	1958	France	No	No	Yes	Referendum on a new French constitution. A no vote would have led to independence.
Gabon	1958	France	No	No	Yes	Referendum on a new French constitution. A no vote would have led to independence.
Guinea	1958	France	Yes	Yes	Yes	Referendum on a new French constitution. A no vote would have led to independence.
Ivory Coast	1958	France	No	No	Yes	Referendum on a new French constitution. A no vote would have led to independence.
Madagascar	1958	France	No	No	Yes	Referendum on a new French constitution. A no vote would have led to independence.
Mali	1958	France	No	No	Yes	Referendum on a new French constitution. A no vote would have led to independence.
Mauritania	1958	France	No	No	Yes	Referendum on a new French constitution. A no vote would have led to independence.
New Caledonia	1958	France	No	No	Yes	Referendum on a new French constitution. A no vote would have led to independence.
Niger	1958	France	No	No	Yes	Referendum on a new French constitution. A no vote would have led to independence.
Saint Pierre and Miquelon	1958	France	No	No	Yes	Referendum on a new French constitution. A no vote would have led to independence.
Senegal	1958	France	No	No	Yes	Referendum on a new French constitution. A no vote would have led to independence.
Upper Volta	1958	France	No	No	Yes	Referendum on a new French constitution. A no vote would have led to independence.
Western Samoa	1961	New Zealand	Yes	Yes	Yes	
Algeria	1962	France	Yes	Yes	Yes	
Malta	1964	United Kingdom	Yes	Yes	Yes	
Rhodesia	1964	United Kingdom	Yes	De facto	No	Unilaterally declared independence.
Djibouti	1967	France	No	No	Yes	
Puerto Rico	1967	United States	No	No	Yes	
West Papua	1969	Indonesia	No	No	Yes	
Northern Mariana Islands	1969	United States	No	No	Yes	
Bahrain	1970	United Kingdom	Yes	Yes	Yes	
Niue	1974	New Zealand	Majority for associated status	Associated status achieved	Yes	Became an associated state of New Zealand.
Comoros	1974	France	Yes	Yes	Yes	Mayotte remained with France.
Trust Territory of the Pacific Islands	1975	United States	No	No	Yes	
Guam	1976	United States	No	No	Yes	
Aruba	1977	Netherlands	Yes	No	Yes	Independence plans dropped in 1994.
Djibouti	1977	France	Yes	Yes	Yes	
Nevis	1977	Saint Christopher-Nevis-Anguilla	Yes	No	No	Unofficial referendum to become independent from Saint Christopher-Nevis-Anguilla and attain Crown colony status within the British Empire. Unrecognized by the central government.
Quebec	1980	Canada	No	No	Yes	
Ciskei	1980	South Africa	Yes	De facto	Partial	Recognized by South Africa; not by the international community.
Guam	1982	United States	No	No	Yes	
Micronesia	1983	United States	Yes	Yes	Yes	Became an associated state of the United States.
Marshall Islands	1983	United States	No	No	Yes	
Palau	1983	United States	No	No	Yes	Became an associated state of the United States.
Palau	1984	United States	No	No	Yes	Became an associated state of the United States.
Cocos (Keeling) Islands	1984	Australia	No	No	Yes	
Falkland Islands	1986	United Kingdom	No	No	Yes	
New Caledonia	1987	France	No	No	Yes	
Slovenia	1990	Yugoslavia	Yes	Yes	Yes	Unilaterally declared independence.
Armenia	1991	Soviet Union	Yes	Yes	Yes	
Azerbaijan	1991	Soviet Union	Yes	Yes	Yes	
Croatia	1991	Yugoslavia	Yes	Yes	Yes	Unilaterally declared independence.
Estonia	1991	Soviet Union	Yes	Yes	Yes	
Georgia	1991	Soviet Union	Yes	Yes	Yes	
Kosova	1991	Yugoslavia	Yes	No	No	Only recognized by Albania.
Latvia	1991	Soviet Union	Yes	Yes	Yes	
Lithuania	1991	Soviet Union	Yes	Yes	Yes	
Macedonia	1991	Yugoslavia	Yes	Yes	Yes	
Nagorno-Karabakh	1991	Soviet Union	Yes	De facto	No	Unilaterally declared independence, reintegrated into the Republic of Azerbaijan in 2024 after the 2023 Azerbaijani offensive in Nagorno-Karabakh.
Ukraine	1991	Soviet Union	Yes	Yes	Yes	
Transnistria	1991	Soviet Union	Yes	De facto	No	Unilaterally declared independence.
Gagauz Republic	1991	Soviet Union	Yes	De facto	No	Unilaterally separated from Moldova; reintegrated into the country in 1995.
Turkmenistan	1991	Soviet Union	Yes	Yes	Yes	
Uzbekistan	1991	Soviet Union	Yes	Yes	Yes	
Bosnia and Herzegovina	1992	Yugoslavia	Yes	Yes	Yes	Unilaterally declared independence.
Montenegro	1992	Yugoslavia	No	No	Yes	Montenegro split from Serbia and Montenegro in 2006.
South Ossetia	1992	Georgia	Yes	De facto	No	Unilaterally declared independence.
Eritrea	1993	Ethiopia	Yes	Yes	Yes	
United States Virgin Islands	1993	United States	No	No	Yes	
Puerto Rico	1993	United States	No	No	Yes	
Curaçao	1993	Netherlands	No	No	Yes	
Bonaire	1994	Netherlands	No	No	Yes	
Sint Maarten	1994	Netherlands	No	No	Yes	
Saba	1994	Netherlands	No	No	Yes	
Sint Eustatius	1994	Netherlands	No	No	Yes	
Bermuda	1995	United Kingdom	No	No	Yes	
Quebec	1995	Canada	No	No	Yes	
Seborga	1995	Italy	Yes	No	No	Regarded as a micronation.
Anjouan	1997	Comoros	Yes	De facto	No	Reintegrated with the Comoros in 2001.
Nevis	1998	Saint Kitts and Nevis	Yes	No	Yes	2/3 majority was required for independence.
Puerto Rico	1998	United States	No	No	Yes	
East Timor	1999	Indonesia	Yes	Yes	Yes	
Sint Maarten	2000	Netherlands	No	No	Yes	
Somaliland	2001	Somalia	Yes	De facto	No	
Bonaire	2004	Netherlands	No	No	Yes	
Saba	2004	Netherlands	No	No	Yes	
Kurdistan	2005	Iraq	Yes	No	No	
Curaçao	2005	Netherlands	No	No	Yes	
Sint Eustatius	2005	Netherlands	No	No	Yes	
Montenegro	2006	Serbia and Montenegro	Yes	Yes	Yes	
South Ossetia	2006	Georgia	Yes	De facto	No	
Transnistria	2006	Moldova	Yes	De facto	No	
Tokelau	2006	New Zealand	Majority for associated status but Quorum not reached	Associated status not achieved	Yes	The referendum was on whether Tokelau should become an associated state of New Zealand. 2/3 majority was required.
Tokelau	2007	New Zealand	Majority for associated status but Quorum not reached	Associated status not achieved	Yes	The referendum was on whether Tokelau should become an associated state of New Zealand. 2/3 majority was required.
Tamil Eelam	2009–2010	Sri Lanka	Yes	No	No	Unofficial referendum. Unrecognized by the government of Sri Lanka.
South Sudan	2011	Sudan	Yes	Yes	Yes	
Puerto Rico	2012	United States	No	No	Yes	
Donetsk	2014	Ukraine	Yes	De facto	No	Unilaterally declared independence.
Luhansk	2014	Ukraine	Yes	De facto	No	Unilaterally declared independence.
Veneto	2014	Italy	Yes	No	No	Unofficial referendum. Unrecognized by the government of Italy.
Scotland	2014	United Kingdom	No	No	Yes	
Catalonia	2014	Spain	Yes	No	No	
Sint Eustatius	2014	Kingdom of the Netherlands	No	No	Yes	
South Brazil	2016	Brazil	Yes	No	No	Unofficial referendum. Unrecognized by the government of Brazil.
Puerto Rico	2017	United States	No	No	Yes	
Kurdistan	2017	Iraq	Yes	No	No	The referendum also took place in the disputed territories of Northern Iraq.
Catalonia	2017	Spain	Yes	No	No	Unilaterally declared independence. Declaration annulled by the government of Spain.
South Brazil	2017	Brazil	Yes	No	No	Unofficial referendum. Unrecognized by the government of Brazil.
New Caledonia	2018	France	No	No	Yes	
Bougainville	2019	Papua New Guinea	Yes	Subject to negotiation	Yes	Nonbinding vote. Independence rests with Papua New Guinea's parliament.
New Caledonia	2020	France	No	No	Yes	
New Caledonia	2021	France	No	No	Yes	Boycotted by pro-independence parties.
Puerto Rico	2024	United States	No	No	Yes	
Biafra	2024	Nigeria	Yes	No	No	
Alberta	2026	Canada	No	No	Yes	

== See also ==
- Balkanization
- Declaration of independence
  - Unilateral declaration of independence
- Decolonization
- Ethnic nationalism
- Independence movement
- Kosovo independence precedent
- List of irredentist claims or disputes
- List of monarchy referendums
- List of proposed state mergers
- List of sovereign states
- List of territorial disputes
- Lists of active separatist movements
- Political status
- Right to exist
- Secession
- Annexation
- Self-determination
- Self-governance
- Sovereignty
- Succession of states
- Territorial integrity
- Wars of national liberation
