= 1958 Cameroonian constitutional referendum =

A referendum on the new constitution of France was held in French Cameroons on 28 September 1958 as part of a wider referendum held across the French Union. The new constitution would see the territory become part of the new French Community if accepted, or result in independence if rejected. It was approved by 96.6% of voters.

== Results ==
Choice	Votes	%
For	10,544	96.6
Against	368	3.4
Invalid/blank votes	492	–
Total	11,404	100
Registered voters/turnout	15,400	74.1
Source: Sternberger et al.
