= 1958 Comorian constitutional referendum =

28 September 1958
- Referendum on the new constitution of France

Results
Choice	Votes	%
Yes	63,899	97.33%
No	1,756	2.67%
Valid votes	65,655	99.60%
Invalid or blank votes	265	0.40%
Total votes	65,920	100.00%
Registered voters/turnout	71,099	92.72%

A referendum on the new constitution of France was held in the Comoros on 28 September 1958 as part of a wider referendum held across the French Union. The new constitution would see the country become part of the new French Community if accepted, or result in independence if rejected. It was approved by 97.33% of voters.

== Results ==
Choice	Votes	%
For	63,899	97.33
Against	1,756	2.67
Invalid/blank votes	265	–
Total	65,920	100
Registered voters/turnout	71,099	92.72
Source: Direct Democracy
