= 1994 Saban status referendum =

A status referendum was held on the island of Saba on 14 October 1994, alongside simultaneous referendums on Bonaire, Sint Eustatius and Sint Maarten. A majority voted for maintaining the status quo.

== Result ==
Choice	Votes	%
Status quo		86.3
Autonomy		9.6
Integration with the Netherlands		3.6
Independence		0.5
Invalid/blank votes		–
Total		100
Registered voters/turnout		
Source: Direct Democracy

== See also ==
- 1994 Bonaire status referendum
- 1994 Sint Eustatius status referendum
- 1994 Sint Maarten status referendum
