= 1994 Sint Eustatius status referendum =

A status referendum was held on the island of Sint Eustatius on 14 October 1994, alongside simultaneous referendums on Bonaire, Saba and Sint Maarten. A majority voted for maintaining the status quo.

== Result ==
Choice	Votes	%
Status quo		90.7
Autonomy		6.8
Integration with the Netherlands		2.3
Independence		0.2
Invalid/blank votes		–
Total		100
Registered voters/turnout		44.0
Source: Direct Democracy

== See also ==
- 1994 Bonaire status referendum
- 1994 Saban status referendum
- 1994 Sint Maarten status referendum
