= 1958 Dahomeyan constitutional referendum =

28 September 1958
- Do you approve of the Constitution offered by the Government of the Republic?

Results
Choice	Votes	%
Yes	418,963	97.84%
No	9,246	2.16%
Valid votes	428,209	99.26%
Invalid or blank votes	3,198	0.74%
Total votes	431,407	100.00%
Registered voters/turnout	775,170	55.65%

A referendum on the new constitution of France was held in Dahomey on 28 September 1958 as part of a wider referendum held across the French Union. The new constitution would see the country become part of the new French Community if accepted, or result in independence if rejected. It was approved by 98% of voters.

== Results ==
Choice	Votes	%
For	418,963	97.84
Against	9,246	2.16
Total	428,209	100.00
Valid votes	428,209	99.26
Invalid/blank votes	3,198	0.74
Total votes	431,407	100.00
Registered voters/turnout	775,170	55.65
Source: Direct Democracy
