= 1958 Senegalese constitutional referendum =

A referendum on the new constitution of France was held in Senegal on 28 September 1958 as part of a wider referendum held across the French Union. The new constitution would see the country become part of the new French Community if accepted, or result in independence if rejected. It was approved by 97.55% of voters.

== Results ==
Choice	Votes	%
For	870,362	97.55
Against	21,901	2.45
Total	892,263	100.00
Valid votes	892,263	99.88
Invalid/blank votes	1,106	0.12
Total votes	893,369	100.00
Registered voters/turnout	1,106,828	80.71
Source: Direct Democracy
