= 1958 Moyen-Congo constitutional referendum =

A referendum on the new Constitution of France was held in Moyen-Congo on 28 September 1958 as part of a wider referendum held across the French Union. The new constitution would make the territory an autonomous republic within the French Community, and was approved by 99% of voters. The Territorial Assembly proclaimed the Republic of the Congo on 28 November 1958, and the country became independent two years later.

== Results ==
Choice	Votes	%
For	339,436	99.38
Against	2,133	0.62
Invalid/blank votes	781	–
Total	342,350	100
Registered voters/turnout	433,403	78.99
Source: Direct Democracy
