= 1958 Mauritanian constitutional referendum =

Referendum in Mauritania, French Union

A referendum on the new constitution of France was held in Mauritania on 28 September 1958 as part of a wider referendum held across the French Union. The new constitution would see the country become part of the new French Community if accepted, or result in independence if rejected. It was approved by 94.04% of voters.

== Results ==
Choice	Votes	%
For	302,018	94.04
Against	19,126	5.96
Invalid/blank votes	1,307	–
Total	322,451	100
Registered voters/turnout	382,870	84.22
Source: Direct Democracy
