= 1958 Upper Voltan constitutional referendum =

28 September 1958

Results
Choice	Votes	%
Yes	1,415,651	99.18%
No	11,687	0.82%
Valid votes	1,427,338	99.73%
Invalid or blank votes	3,829	0.27%
Total votes	1,431,167	100.00%
Registered voters/turnout	1,914,908	74.74%

A referendum on the new constitution of France was held in Upper Volta on 28 September 1958 as part of a wider referendum held across the French Union. The new constitution would see the country become part of the new French Community if accepted, or result in independence if rejected. It was approved by 99.18% of voters.

== Results ==
Choice	Votes	%
For	1,415,651	99.18
Against	11,687	0.82
Invalid/blank votes	3,829	–
Total	1,431,167	100
Registered voters/turnout	1,914,908	74.74
Source: Direct Democracy
