= 1958 Malagasy constitutional referendum =

A referendum on the new constitution of France was held in Madagascar on 28 September 1958 as part of a wider referendum held across the French Union. The new constitution would see the country become part of the new French Community if accepted, or result in independence if rejected. It was approved by 77.64% of voters. The country subsequently became independent on 26 June 1960.

== Results ==
Choice	Votes	%
For	1,363,059	77.64
Against	392,557	22.36
Total	1,755,616	100.00
Valid votes	1,755,616	99.33
Invalid/blank votes	11,859	0.67
Total votes	1,767,475	100.00
Registered voters/turnout	2,154,909	82.02
Source: Official Journal
