= 1991 Turkmen independence referendum =

- 26 October 1991

Do you agree with the legislative establishment of Turkmenistan as an independent democratic state?
For	94.1%
Against	5.9%

Do you support the statement of the President and Supreme Soviet of the Turkmenistan Soviet Socialist Republic "On the domestic and foreign policy of Turkmenistan" and the practical activity to implement it?
For	93.5%
Against	6.5%

An independence referendum was held in the Turkmen SSR on 26 October 1991.

== Background ==
The policies of demokratizatsiya and perestroika as enacted by Mikhail Gorbachev led to the gradual loss of the Communist Party of the Soviet Union's iron grip over its constituent federal republics. Nationalistic sentiments were on the rise—often fomenting in widescale protests—across late 1980s, leading to the parade of sovereignties.

In Turkmenistan, the national conservative Agzybirlik (Unification) took up the cause of independence and gained a significant base among native Turkmens. Saparmurat Niyazov—then Secretary of the Supreme Soviet—had the party banned for anti-Soviet activities, and suppressed dissent. However, in what the first multi-party election to the Supreme Soviet (1990), multiple independent candidates won and propagated nationalist sentiments.

Despite this, in the March 1991 referendum, 98% of voters proposed to preserve the Turkmen SSR as an equal sovereign republic of the USSR. A treaty to the effect was agreed upon to be signed but a day before, hardline communists launched a coup in Russia. Niyazov remained ambivalent to the coup but once it failed and Russia made its intentions clear to leave USSR, he prepared for the inevitable disintegration of the USSR and independence of Turkmenistan. The independence referendum was held in this context, and with the aim of rebranding Niyazov as an able leader in the testing times of transition and to pave the way to eventual autocracy.

== Questions ==
Voters were asked two questions:

1. Do you agree with the legislative establishment of Turkmenistan as an independent democratic state?
2. Do you support the statement of the President and Supreme Soviet of the Turkmenistan Soviet Socialist Republic "On the domestic and foreign policy of Turkmenistan" and the practical activity to implement it?

== Results ==
=== Independence ===
Choice	Votes	%
For	1,707,725	94.07
Against	107,693	5.93
Total	1,815,418	100.00
Registered voters/turnout	1,864,142	–
Source: Direct Democracy

=== Niyazovism ===
Choice	Votes	%
For		93.5
Against		6.5
Total		
Registered voters/turnout	1,864,142	–
Source: Direct Democracy
