= 1958 Chadian constitutional referendum =

- 28 September 1958

Results
| Choice | Votes | % |
|---|---|---|
| Yes | 804,355 | 98.29% |
| No | 14,032 | 1.71% |
| Valid votes | 818,387 | 99.44% |
| Invalid or blank votes | 4,628 | 0.56% |
| Total votes | 823,015 | 100.00% |
| Registered voters/turnout | 1,243,450 | 66.19% |

A referendum on the new constitution of France was held in Chad on 28 September 1958 as part of a wider referendum held across the French Union. The new constitution would see the country become part of the new French Community if accepted, or result in independence if rejected. It was approved by 98.29% of voters.

== Results ==
| Choice | Votes | % |
|---|---|---|
| For | 804,355 | 98.29 |
| Against | 14,032 | 1.71 |
| Total | 818,387 | 100.00 |
| Valid votes | 818,387 | 99.44 |
| Invalid/blank votes | 4,628 | 0.56 |
| Total votes | 823,015 | 100.00 |
| Registered voters/turnout | 1,243,450 | 66.19 |
Source: Official Journal
