= 1958 French Sudan constitutional referendum =

28 September 1958
- Do you approve of the Constitution proposed to you by the Government of the Republic?

Results
Choice	Votes	%
Yes	945,586	97.54%
No	23,875	2.46%
Valid votes	969,461	99.72%
Invalid or blank votes	2,736	0.28%
Total votes	972,197	100.00%
Registered voters/turnout	2,142,266	45.38%

A referendum on the new constitution of France was held in French Sudan on 28 September 1958 as part of a wider referendum held across the French Union. The new constitution would see the country become part of the new French Community if accepted, or result in independence if rejected. It was approved by 97.54% of voters.

== Results ==
Choice	Votes	%
For	945,586	97.54
Against	23,875	2.46
Invalid/blank votes	2,736	–
Total	972,197	100
Registered voters/turnout	2,142,266	45.38
Source: Direct Democracy
