= 1958 Ivorian constitutional referendum =

A referendum on the new constitution of France was held in Ivory Coast on 28 September 1958 as part of a wider referendum held across the French Union. The new constitution would see the country become part of the new French Community if accepted, or result in independence if rejected. It was approved by 99.99% of voters.

== Results ==
Choice	Votes	%
For	1,595,238	99.99
Against	216	0.01
Invalid/blank votes	1,156	–
Total	1,596,610	100
Registered voters/turnout	1,636,533	97.56
Source: Direct Democracy
