= 1958 Ubangi-Shari constitutional referendum =

A referendum on the new constitution of France was held in Ubangi-Shari on 28 September 1958 as part of a wider referendum held across the French Union. The new constitution would see the country become part of the new French Community if accepted, or result in independence if rejected. It was approved by 98.77% of voters.

== Results ==
Choice	Votes	%
For	487,033	98.77
Against	6,089	1.23
Invalid/blank votes	3,553	–
Total	496,675	100
Registered voters/turnout	625,663	79.38
Source: Direct Democracy
