= 1958 Saint Pierre and Miquelon constitutional referendum =

Referendum on joining the French Community

A referendum on the new constitution of France was held in Saint Pierre and Miquelon on 28 September 1958 as part of a wider referendum held across the French Union. The new constitution would see the country become part of the new French Community if accepted, or result in independence if rejected. It was approved by 98% of voters.

== Results ==
| Choice | Votes | % |
|---|---|---|
| For | 2,325 | 98.06 |
| Against | 46 | 1.94 |
| Total | 2,371 | 100.00 |
| Valid votes | 2,371 | 91.26 |
| Invalid/blank votes | 227 | 8.74 |
| Total votes | 2,598 | 100.00 |
| Registered voters/turnout | 2,802 | 92.72 |
Source: Direct Democracy
