= Second referendum =

Second referendum may refer to:

- 1995 Quebec referendum
- 2005 Curaçao status referendum
- 2006 South Ossetian independence referendum
- 2017 Catalan independence referendum

== See also ==
- Proposed referendum on the Brexit withdrawal agreement
- Proposed second Scottish independence referendum
