= 1958 New Caledonian constitutional referendum =

28 September 1958
- Do you approve of the Constitution proposed by the Government of the Republic?

Results
Choice	Votes	%
Yes	26,085	98.12%
No	500	1.88%
Valid votes	26,585	98.36%
Invalid or blank votes	443	1.64%
Total votes	27,028	100.00%
Registered voters/turnout	35,163	76.86%

A referendum on the new constitution of France was held in New Caledonia on 28 September 1958 as part of a wider referendum held across the French Union. If accepted, the new constitution would see the country become part of the new French Community. If rejected, the referendum would result in independence. It was approved by 98.12% of voters.

== Campaign ==
In August 1958 the leaders of the two main parties, Maurice Lenormand of the Caledonian Union and Georges Chatenay of the National Centre of Social Republicans, met French President Charles de Gaulle and committed to advocate for a 'yes' vote.

The Caledonien newspaper attacked Governor Aimé Grimald for supporting the 'yes' campaign. Some trade unionists opposed supporting the new constitution, arguing that de Gaulle was aligned with the wealthy.

== Results ==
Voters were asked the question "Do you approve of the Constitution proposed by the Government of the Republic".

Choice	Votes	%
For	26,085	98.12
Against	500	1.88
Total	26,585	100.00
Valid votes	26,585	98.36
Invalid/blank votes	443	1.64
Total votes	27,028	100.00
Registered voters/turnout	35,163	76.86
Source: Direct Democracy
