= 2005 Sint Eustatius status referendum =

A status referendum was held on the island of Sint Eustatius on 8 April 2005.

== Background ==
After the 1994 referendum came out in favour of maintaining and restructuring the Netherlands Antilles, the government of the Netherlands Antilles tried to restructure the Netherlands Antilles and attempted to forge closer ties between the islands, as is exemplified by the adoption of an anthem of the Netherlands Antilles in 2000. A new referendum on Sint Maarten, which was in favour of a separate status for Sint Maarten as a country within the Kingdom of the Netherlands, sparked a new series of referendums across the Netherlands Antilles, however.

Sint Eustatius was the only island to again vote for retaining the Netherlands Antilles. However, since none of the other islands chose to remain part of the Netherlands Antilles, the Sint Eustatius island council opted for direct ties with the Netherlands.

== Result ==
Choice	Votes	%
Remain part of the Netherlands Antilles	605	76.58
Direct constitutional ties with the Netherlands	163	20.63
Integration into the Netherlands	17	2.15
Independence	5	0.63
Invalid/blank votes	?	–
Total	790+?	100
Registered voters/turnout	1,411	55.98
Source: Direct Democracy

== See also ==
- Dissolution of the Netherlands Antilles
  - 2000 Sint Maarten status referendum
  - 2004 Bonaire status referendum
  - 2004 Saban status referendum
  - 2005 Curaçao status referendum
