= 1958 French constitutional referendum =

- 28 September 1958
- Do you approve of the Constitution offered by the Government of the Republic?

Results
Choice	Votes	%
Yes	31,123,483	82.60%
No	6,556,073	17.40%
Valid votes	37,679,556	98.90%
Invalid or blank votes	418,297	1.10%
Total votes	38,097,853	100.00%
Registered voters/turnout	47,249,142	80.63%
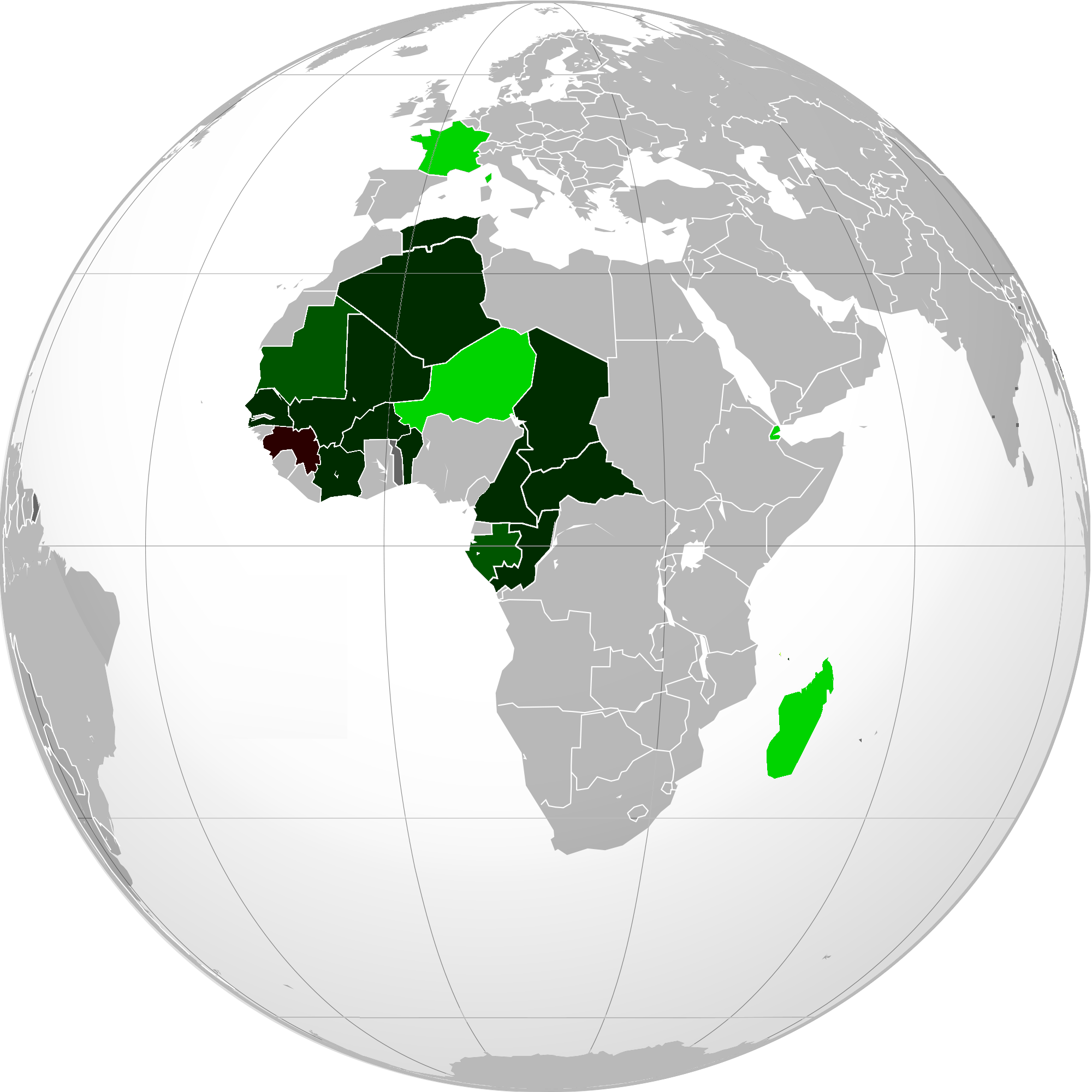
- Yes: 60–65% 65–70% 70–75% 75–80% 80–85% 85–90% 90–95% 95–100% No: 95–100%

A constitutional referendum was held in France on 28 September 1958. Voters were asked whether they approved of the adoption of a constitution for the French Fifth Republic written by Charles de Gaulle. It was overwhelmingly approved, with 82.6% in favour. Voter turnout was 84.9% in metropolitan France and 79.8% overall.

== Results ==
Choice	Metropolitan France		Total	
Choice	Votes	%	Votes	%
For	17,668,790	79.3	31,123,483	82.6
Against	4,624,511	20.7	6,556,073	17.4
Invalid/blank votes	303,549	–	418,297	–
Total	22,596,850	100	38,097,853	100
Source: Nohlen & Stöver

The total includes Overseas departments, Algeria, Sahara, Overseas territories (except Guinea, French Togoland, French Cameroon, French New Hebrides and Wallis and Futuna) and French citizens living abroad.

=== By territory ===
Territory	Votes for	%	Votes against	%	Invalid/ blank votes	Total votes	Registered voters	Turnout
Algeria	3,357,763	96.59	118,631	3.41	38,816	3,515,210	4,412,171	79.67
Chad	804,355	98.29	14,032	1.71	4,628	823,015	1,243,450	66.19
Comoros	63,899	97.33	1,756	2.67	265	65,920	71,099	92.72
Côte d'Ivoire	1,595,238	99.99	216	0.01	1,156	1,596,610	1,636,533	97.56
Dahomey	418,963	97.84	9,246	2.16	3,198	431,407	775,170	55.65
French Polynesia	16,196	64.40	8,952	35.60	99	25,247	30,950	81.57
French Somaliland	8,662	75.24	2,851	24.76	70	11,583	15,914	72.78
French Sudan	945,586	97.54	23,875	2.46	2,736	972,197	2,142,266	45.38
Gabon	190,334	92.58	15,244	7.42	3,022	208,600	265,161	78.67
Guinea	56,981	4.78	1,136,324	95.22	10,570	1,203,875	1,408,500	85.47
Madagascar	1,363,059	77.64	392,557	22.36	11,859	1,677,475	2,154,939	82.02
Mauritania	302,018	94.04	19,126	5.96	1,307	322,451	382,870	84.22
Moyen-Congo	339,436	99.38	2,133	0.62	781	342,350	433,403	78.99
New Caledonia	26,085	98.12	500	1.88	443	27,028	35,163	76.86
Niger	372,383	78.43	102,395	21.57	19,175	493,953	1,320,174	37.42
Sahara	232,113	98.60	3,289	1.40	910	236,312	282,099	83.77
Saint Pierre and Miquelon	2,325	98.06	46	1.94	227	2,598	2,802	92.72
Senegal	870,362	97.55	21,901	2.45	1,106	893,369	1,106,828	80.71
Ubangi-Shari	487,033	98.77	6,089	1.23	3,553	496,675	625,663	79.38
Upper Volta	1,415,651	99.18	11,687	0.82	3,829	1,431,167	1,914,908	74.74
Source: Official Journal, Direct Democracy

== See also ==
- 1958 Cameroonian constitutional referendum
- 1958 Chadian constitutional referendum
- 1958 Comorian constitutional referendum
- 1958 Dahomeyan constitutional referendum
- 1958 French Polynesian constitutional referendum
- 1958 French Somaliland constitutional referendum
- 1958 French Sudan constitutional referendum
- 1958 Gabonese constitutional referendum
- 1958 Guinean constitutional referendum
- 1958 Ivorian constitutional referendum
- 1958 Malagasy constitutional referendum
- 1958 Mauritanian constitutional referendum
- 1958 Moyen-Congo constitutional referendum
- 1958 New Caledonian constitutional referendum
- 1958 Nigerien constitutional referendum
- 1958 Saint Pierre and Miquelon constitutional referendum
- 1958 Senegalese constitutional referendum
- 1958 Ubangi-Shari constitutional referendum
- 1958 Upper Voltan constitutional referendum
- 1958 French constitutional referendum in French Togoland
