= 1984 Palauan Compact of Free Association referendum =

A second referendum on the Compact of Free Association was held in Palau on 4 September 1984, after the previous referendum had failed to achieve the 75% in favour necessary. Voters were asked two questions:

1. Whether they approved of the proposed Compact of Free Association between Palau and the United States
2. What their preference for a future political status was if the Free Association (question one) was rejected. They were offered the choice of a closer relationship than Trusteeship, or independence.

The first question was approved by 67.1% of voters, making the outcome of the second question (in which 3,378 blank ballots had been cast, more than either of the choices given) irrelevant. Voter turnout was 71.3%.

== Results ==
=== Question 1 ===
Choice	Votes	%
For	4,290	67.1
Against	2,103	32.9
Invalid/blank votes	65	-
Total	6,458	100
Source: Nohlen et al.

=== Question 2 ===
Choice	Votes	%
Closer relationship	2,127	69.4
Independence	936	30.6
Invalid/blank votes	3,395	-
Total	6,458	100
Source: Nohlen et al.
