= 1991 Latvian independence and democracy referendum =

- 3 March 1991
- Are you for a democratic and independent Latvia?

Results
Choice	Votes	%
Yes	1,227,562	74.90%
No	411,374	25.10%
Valid votes	1,638,936	98.37%
Invalid or blank votes	27,192	1.63%
Total votes	1,666,128	100.00%
Registered voters/turnout	1,902,802	87.56%

Poster for the "Poll on a democratic, sovereignly independent Republic of Latvia 3 March 1991"

An independence referendum was held in the Latvian SSR on 3 March 1991, alongside a similar referendum in the Estonian SSR the same day. Known as the "Popular Survey about the independence of the Republic of Latvia", voters were asked "are you in favour of a democratic and independent Republic of Latvia". It was approved by 74.9% of voters, with a turnout of 87.6%. Latvian Republic civilians registered in Soviet Army units also had the right to vote in this poll.

The independence of Latvia was restored on 21 August 1991.

== Results ==
Choice	Votes	%
For	1,227,562	74.90
Against	411,374	25.10
Total	1,638,936	100.00
Valid votes	1,638,936	98.37
Invalid/blank votes	27,192	1.63
Total votes	1,666,128	100.00
Registered voters/turnout	1,902,802	87.56
Source: Central Election Commission

== See also ==
- 1991 Estonian independence referendum
- 1991 Lithuanian independence referendum
- 1991 Soviet Union referendum
