= 1991 Lithuanian independence referendum =

9 February 1991
- Are you in favor of the state of Lithuania being an independent democratic republic?
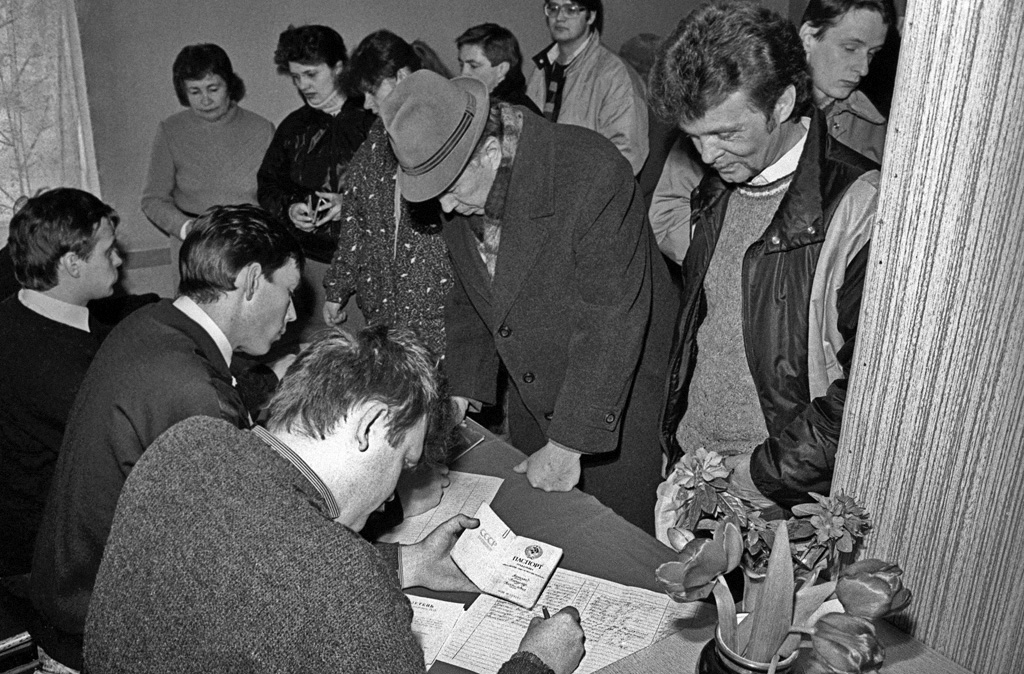
- Voters at a Lithuanian polling station

Results
Choice	Votes	%
Yes	2,028,339	93.24%
No	147,040	6.76%
Valid votes	2,175,379	96.78%
Invalid or blank votes	72,431	3.22%
Total votes	2,247,810	100.00%
Registered voters/turnout	2,652,738	84.74%

An independence referendum was held in Lithuania on 9 February 1991, eleven months after independence from the Soviet Union had been declared on 11 March 1990. Just over 93% of those voting voted in favour of independence, while the number of eligible voters voting "yes" was 76.5%, far exceeding the threshold of 50%. Independence was subsequently achieved in August 1991. The independence of the Republic of Lithuania was re-recognized by the United States on 2 September 1991 and by the Soviet Union on 6 September 1991.

== Results ==
Choice	Votes	%
For	2,028,339	93.24
Against	147,040	6.76
Total	2,175,379	100.00
Valid votes	2,175,379	96.78
Invalid/blank votes	72,431	3.22
Total votes	2,247,810	100.00
Registered voters/turnout	2,652,738	84.74
Source: Nohlen & Stöver

== See also ==
- 1991 Latvian independence and democracy referendum
- 1991 Estonian independence referendum
- 1991 Soviet Union referendum
