= 1846 Liberian independence referendum =

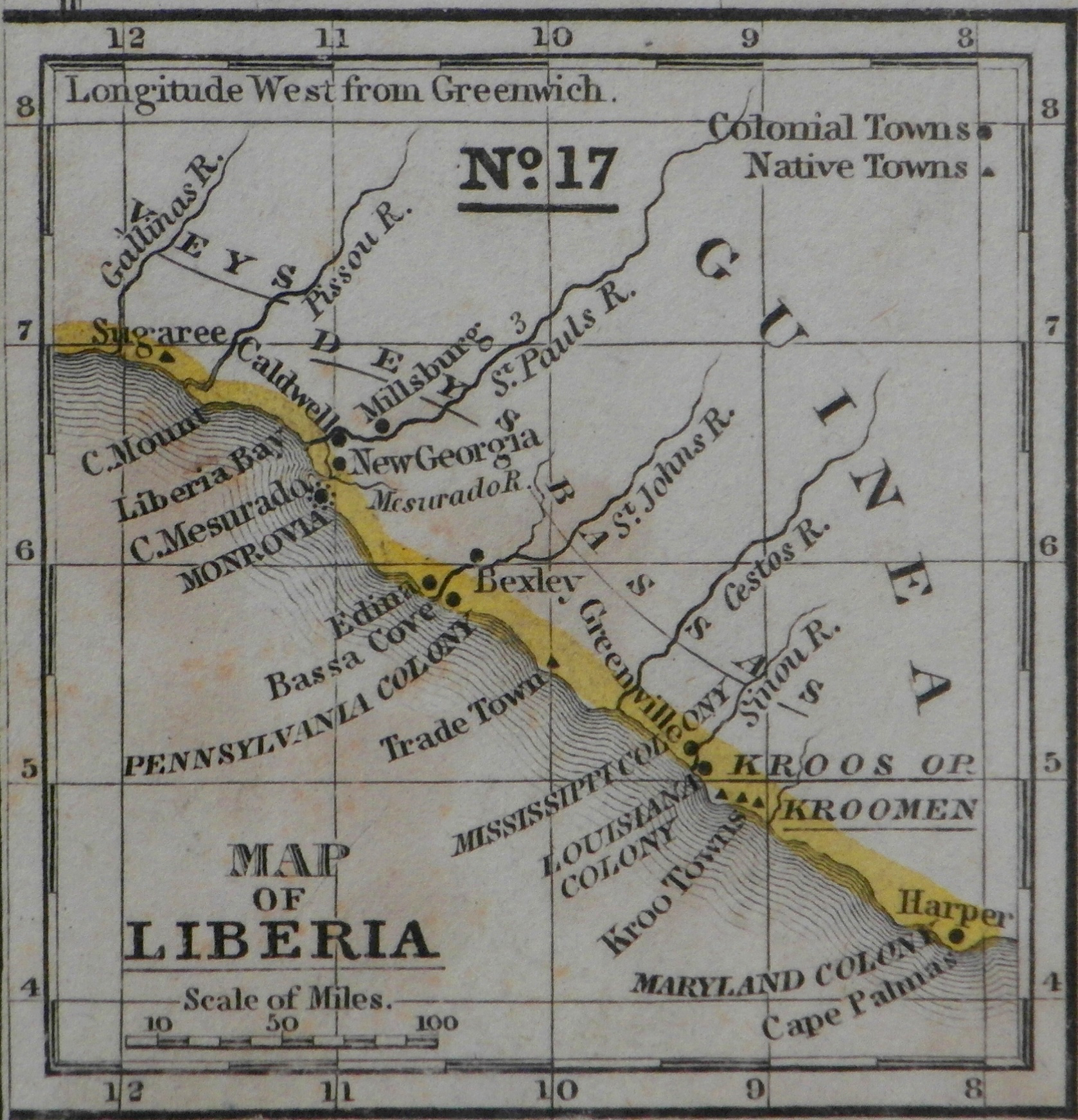
Map of Liberia Colony in the 1830s created by the ACS, also showing Mississippi Colony and other state-sponsored colonies.

An independence referendum was held in Liberia on 27 October 1846. The result was 52% in favor, with independence being declared on 26 July 1847.

The American Colonization Society (ACS) had established the colony of Liberia in 1817, with an appointed governor. The British did not acknowledge Liberian customs as the colony was not independent, and during the mid-19th century there were continuous clashes between Liberian government and British merchants from Sierra Leone over payment of taxes, with the merchants arguing that the country had no right to impose taxes.

Following independence, a constitution that had been agreed on 26 July 1847 was approved in a referendum in September.

== Background ==
In the United States, there was a movement to resettle free people of color and freed slaves in Africa, believing they would face better chances for freedom in Africa than in the United States where their rights were still restricted. The American Colonization Society (ACS) was founded in 1816 in Washington, D.C. for this purpose, by a group of prominent politicians and slaveowners. Most African-Americans, who were native-born by this time, wanted to work toward justice in the United States rather than emigrate. The ACS, supported by prominent American politicians such as Abraham Lincoln, Henry Clay, and James Monroe, believed repatriation of free African-Americans was preferable to widespread emancipation of slaves. Similar state-based organizations established colonies in Mississippi-in-Africa and the Republic of Maryland, which were later annexed by Liberia. Colonizationists used their position to influence other former slaves to return to Africa. These individuals believed that "they could create their own version of the United States beyond the borders of a white republic."

In 1822, the ACS began sending African-American volunteers to the Pepper Coast to establish a colony for African-Americans. By 1867, the ACS (and state-related chapters) had assisted in the migration of more than 13,000 African-Americans to Liberia. These free African-Americans and their descendants married within their community and came to identify as Americo-Liberians. Many were of mixed race and educated in American culture; they did not identify with the indigenous natives of the tribes they encountered. They intermarried largely within the colonial community, developing an ethnic group that had a cultural tradition infused with American notions of political republicanism and Protestant Christianity. They knew nothing of the indigenous cultures, languages or animist religion. Encounters with tribal Africans in the bush often developed into violent confrontations. The colonial settlements were raided by the Kru and Grebo from their inland chiefdoms. Because of feeling set apart and superior by their culture and education to the indigenous people, the Americo-Liberians developed as a small elite that held on to political power. It excluded the indigenous tribesmen from birthright citizenship in their own lands until 1904, in a repetition of the United States' treatment of Native Americans.

The ACS and American-Africans mutually agreed that Liberia was its own separate entity. The colony needed some form of formal process to realize its statehood. Even before, declaring independence the ACS was helping Liberia draft a constitution. The first referendum for independence occurred in November 1846. The general population was badly split. The referendum relied on more information from the legislature to make an adequate decision. Members of both sides decided to present arguments to sway votes.

Many Liberians, especially the rich, who were affected by the continuous regression of the ACS, began to seek independence. During the mid-19th century, there were also continuous clashes between Liberian government and British merchants from Sierra Leone, with the merchants arguing that the country had no right to impose taxes. The elites in the colony wanted to declare sovereignty to overcome the issue, resulting in the declaration.

=== British influence ===
British influence in Western Africa continued to expand when Sierra Leone was absorbed by Britain. Britain looked to expand its influence into more of Western Africa. Colonists were pushed as their sovereignty was threatened by British traders. They attempted to attack their claims on their biggest source of revenue: customs duties. American-Africans utilized this opportunity to consolidate support and establish independence to become a full taxing authority. After settling differences with Britain, Liberia aided Britain in the illegal slave trade. Due to close relations in Western Africa, Britain was the first country to recognize Liberian independence.

=== Other threats to Independence ===
Internally, Liberia struggled in establishing society as discrimination occurred between African-Americans, African tribes, Europeans, and mulattoes. Socioeconomic classes divided interests for the development of Liberia. Externally, other international powers were looking to take advantage of Liberian resources. European diplomats looked to threaten Liberia's sovereignty. Establishing a strong tie to the United States proved vital for survival. Imperialism threatened to damage internal land claims. Establishing colonial authority with the help of the ACS proved vital for Liberia's future.

=== Legislative development ===
The early legislature struggled to divide itself from the American Colonization society. Independence was an afterthought as these African-Americans attempted to establish themselves on the Pepper Coast. The assistance of the ACS was necessary for the colony to continue. Early colonies struggled to establish themselves from the indigenous groups. Monrovia's development allowed for the legislature and the state to develop. Demands for independence only grew starting in the late 1830s and early 1840s after industry and prices. Starting in 1845, the Liberian colonies recognized that independence from the ACS was necessary to achieve their next step- independence. Fever for independence continued to grow as the Liberian government wished to ensure freedom for its citizens. Government meetings in 1846 continued to embrace conversations of independence.

== Results ==
Choice	Votes	%
For		52
Against		48
Total		100
Registered voters/turnout		66
Source: Direct Democracy

== Aftermath ==
On 26 July 1847, the settlers issued a Declaration of Independence and the better-organized political faction led by Joseph Jenkins Roberts who would go on to become the first President of Liberia won the struggle. However, opposition persisted as they rationalized that the ACS had other motives for their land and property.

A constitution was also promulgated based on the political principles denoted in the United States Constitution; drafts of the document were very similar to the U.S. Constitution. The new constitution was approved in a referendum in September 1847, held alongside elections were held for president and vice president. The new government was not able to broker a deal that included the land claims for the provinces. They sent a Declaration of Independence signed by President and Governor, Roberts.

== Remembrance ==
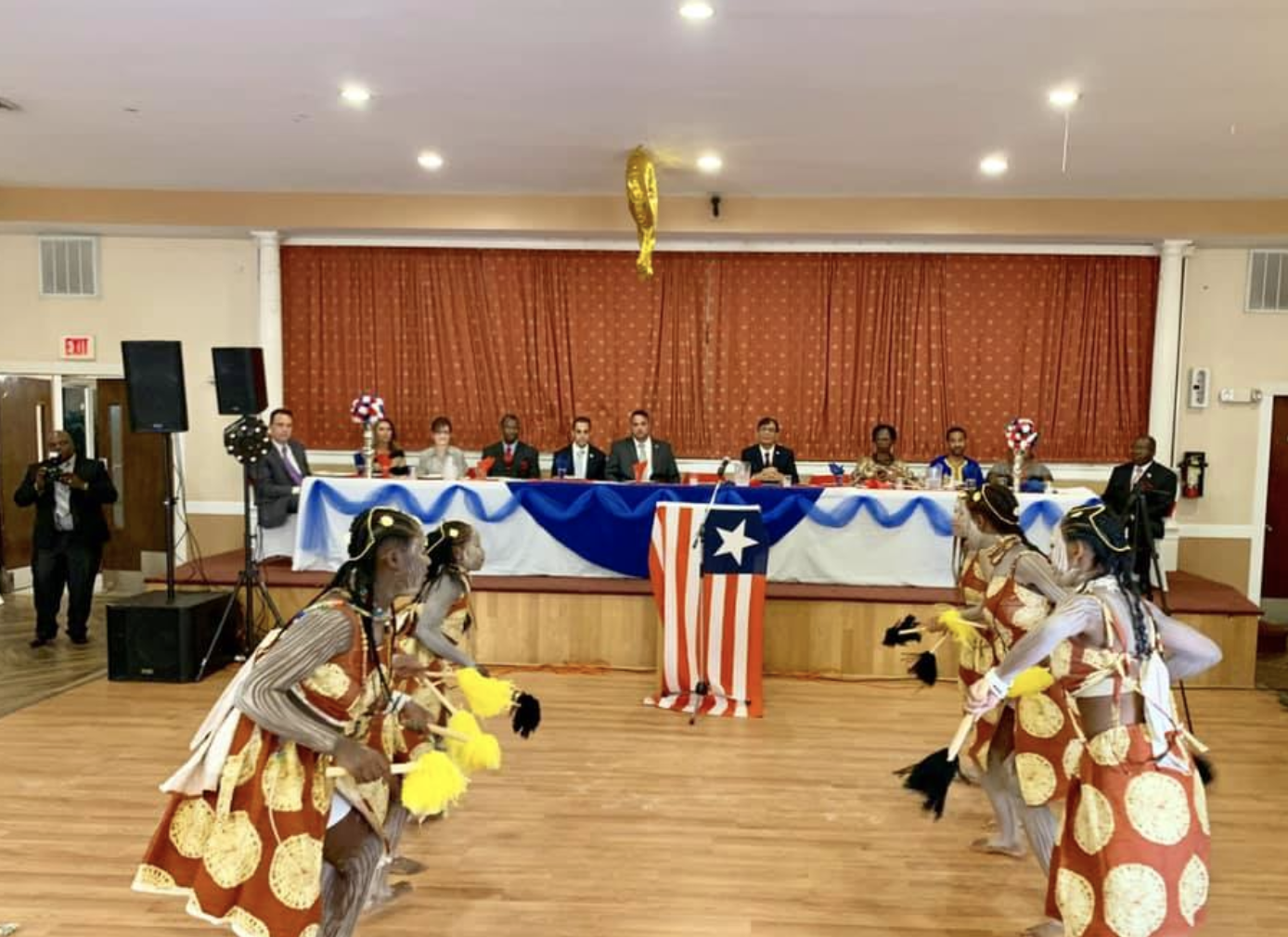
Liberian cultural dances are showcased during a performance in Pennsylvania dedicated to Liberian Independence Day.

26 July is now marked as independence day. In America, Liberians utilize this date as the evolution of their relationship between the United States and Liberia. Celebrations usually involve a music festival. Domestically, Liberian Independence Day is one of the most recognized and celebrated holidays, alongside New Year's, Pioneer's Day, Armed Forces Day, African Liberation Day, Flag Day, and Thanksgiving Day.
