= 1958 French constitutional referendum in French Togoland =

28 September 1958

Results
Choice	Votes	%
Yes	1,775	92.59%
No	142	7.41%
Valid votes	1,917	98.36%
Invalid or blank votes	32	1.64%
Total votes	1,949	100.00%
Registered voters/turnout	2,217	87.91%

A constitutional referendum was held in French Togoland as part of the wider French referendum. Contrasting in other French territories, voting was restricted to French citizens, with only 2,217 people able to vote out of population of 1,284,000.

== Results ==
Choice	Votes	%
For	1,775	92.6
Against	142	7.4
Invalid/blank votes	32	–
Total	1,949	100
Registered voters/turnout	2,217	87.9
Source: Sternberger et al.
