= 2000 Sint Maarten status referendum =

A status referendum was held on the island of Sint Maarten on 22 June 2000.

== Background ==
After the 1994 referendum failed to show support for a separate status for Sint Maarten, the island council of Sint Maarten organized a new referendum in June 2000. This referendum came out in favour of a separate status for Sint Maarten as a country within the Kingdom of the Netherlands, and sparked a new series of referendums across the Netherlands Antilles.

== Results ==
I am in favor of:

1. Sint Maarten maintaining its present status;
2. Sint Maarten remaining a part of a restructured Netherlands Antilles;
3. Sint Maarten becoming a country within the Kingdom of the Netherlands;
4. Sint Maarten becoming an independent country.

| Choice | Votes | % |
|---|---|---|
| Maintaining the present status | 332 | 3.72 |
| Remaining a part of a restructured Netherlands Antilles | 1,050 | 11.82 |
| Becoming a country within the Kingdom of the Netherlands | 6,212 | 69.98 |
| Independence | 1,282 | 14.44 |
| Invalid/blank votes | 145 | – |
| Total | 9,021 | 100 |
| Registered voters/turnout | 16,193 | 55.70 |
Source: Direct Democracy

== See also ==
- Dissolution of the Netherlands Antilles
  - 2004 Bonaire status referendum
  - 2004 Saban status referendum
  - 2005 Curaçao status referendum
  - 2005 Sint Eustatius status referendum
