= 1991 Azerbaijani independence referendum =

- 29 December 1991
- Do you support the Constitutional Act on the state independence of the Republic of Azerbaijan as passed by the Supreme Council of the Republic of Azerbaijan?

Results
Choice	Votes	%
Yes	3,735,398	99.76%
No	9,068	0.24%
Valid votes	3,744,466	99.82%
Invalid or blank votes	6,708	0.18%
Total votes	3,751,174	100.00%

An independence referendum was held in Azerbaijan on 29 December 1991, three days after the collapse of the Soviet Union. The result was 99.8% in favour of a constitutional act on the independence of the Republic of Azerbaijan, with turnout reported to be 95%.

== Results ==
Choice	Votes	%
For	3,735,398	99.76
Against	9,068	0.24
Total	3,744,466	100.00
Valid votes	3,744,466	99.82
Invalid/blank votes	6,708	0.18
Total votes	3,751,174	100.00
Source: Nohlen et al.
