= 2005 Curaçao status referendum =

A status referendum was held on the island of Curaçao on 8 April 2005. The option of becoming an autonomous area within the Kingdom of the Netherlands was approved by 68% of voters.

== Background ==
After the 1993 referendum failed to show support for a separate status for Curaçao, the government of the Netherlands Antilles tried to restructure the Netherlands Antilles and attempted to forge closer ties between the islands, as is exemplified by the adoption of an anthem of the Netherlands Antilles in 2000. A new referendum on Sint Maarten, which was in favour of a separate status for Sint Maarten as a country within the Kingdom of the Netherlands, sparked a new series of referendums across the Netherlands Antilles, however. Curaçao was the last island to vote.

== Results ==
Choice	Votes	%
Autonomous country within the Kingdom of the Netherlands	42,425	67.83
Integration into the Netherlands	14,769	23.61
Independence	3,014	4.82
Remain part of the Netherlands Antilles	2,342	3.74
Total	62,550	100.00
Valid votes	62,550	99.25
Invalid/blank votes	474	0.75
Total votes	63,024	100.00
Registered voters/turnout	114,500	55.04
Source: Direct Democracy

== See also ==
- Dissolution of the Netherlands Antilles
  - 2000 Sint Maarten status referendum
  - 2004 Bonaire status referendum
  - 2004 Saban status referendum
  - 2005 Sint Eustatius status referendum
