= 1991 Estonian independence referendum =

3 March 1991
- Do you want the restoration of the national independence and sovereignty of the Republic of Estonia?

Results
Choice	Votes	%
Yes	737,964	78.41%
No	203,199	21.59%
Valid votes	941,163	99.27%
Invalid or blank votes	6,967	0.73%
Total votes	948,130	100.00%
Registered voters/turnout	1,144,309	82.86%

An independence referendum was held in the Estonian SSR on 3 March 1991, alongside a similar referendum in the Latvian SSR the same day. It was approved by 78% of voters with an 83% turnout. Independence was restored by the Estonian Supreme Council on the night of 20 August.

== Results ==
Voters were asked "Do you want the restoration of the national independence and sovereignty of the Republic of Estonia?"

Choice	Votes	%
For	737,964	78.41
Against	203,199	21.59
Total	941,163	100.00
Valid votes	941,163	99.27
Invalid/blank votes	6,967	0.73
Total votes	948,130	100.00
Registered voters/turnout	1,144,309	82.86
Source: Riigi Teataja

== See also ==
- 1991 Latvian independence and democracy referendum
- 1991 Lithuanian independence referendum
- 1991 Soviet Union referendum
