= 1945 Cambodian referendum =

- 3 October 1945
- Do you want to be free like Jayavarman with the Angkor Wat temples?

Results
Choice	Votes	%
Yes	541,470	100.00%
No	0	0.00%
Valid votes	541,470	100.00%
Invalid or blank votes	0	0.00%
Total votes	541,470	100.00%
Registered voters/turnout	674,048	80.33%
- Results by province Yes: 100%

A six-issue referendum was held in Cambodia on 3 October 1945. The questions included whether the country should become independent, and whether the presence of foreign military forces should be refused. There were no "no" votes to any of the questions, although two had one or two invalid votes. Voter turnout was 80.3%.

== Background ==
On 10 August Son Ngoc Thanh replaced Prime Minister Ung Hy from power, and held a referendum to try and legitimise his government.

== Conduct ==
It is not clear whether the referendum was held by voters putting a ballot paper in a box. Thanh sent a list of five questions to provincial governors for them to ask voters. The question on independence was worded:

Do you want to be free like Jayavarman with the Angkor Wat temples?

== Results ==
Choice	Votes	%
For	541,470	100
Against	0	0
Invalid/blank votes	0	–
Total	541,470	100
Registered voters/turnout	674,048	80.33
Source: Nohlen et al.
