= 2004 Bonaire status referendum =

A status referendum was held on the island of Bonaire on 10 September 2004. A majority voted for integration into the Netherlands.

== Background ==
After the 1994 referendum came out in favour of maintaining and restructuring the Netherlands Antilles, the government of the Netherlands Antilles tried to restructure the Netherlands Antilles and attempted to forge closer ties between the islands, as is exemplified by the adoption of an anthem of the Netherlands Antilles in 2000. A new referendum on Sint Maarten, which was in favour of a separate status for Sint Maarten as a country within the Kingdom of the Netherlands, sparked a new series of referendums across the Netherlands Antilles, however.

== Results ==
Choice	Votes	%
Direct ties with the Netherlands	3,182	59.45
Autonomy within the Kingdom of the Netherlands	1,290	24.11
Status quo	853	15.93
Independence	27	0.51
Invalid/blank votes	106	–
Total	5,458	100
Registered voters/turnout	9,557	57.11
Source: Direct Democracy

== See also ==
- Dissolution of the Netherlands Antilles
  - 2000 Sint Maarten status referendum
  - 2004 Saban status referendum
  - 2005 Curaçao status referendum
  - 2005 Sint Eustatius status referendum
