= 1983 Micronesian Compact of Free Association referendum =

Agreement between Micronesia and the USA

A referendum on the islands' status was held in the Federated States of Micronesia on 21 June 1983. Voters were asked two questions. The first was on whether they approved of the Compact of Free Association between the FSM and the United States. The second was what their preference was if Free Association was rejected. Voters were presented with the option of independence or an alternative which they had to fill in on the ballot form.

The first question was approved by 76.88% of voters, rendering the outcome of the second question (58.04% in favour of independence) moot.

== Results ==
=== Compact of Free Association with the USA ===
Do you approve of the Compact of Free Association and its related Agreements?

Choice	Popular vote		State vote
Choice	Votes	%	State vote
For	20,121	76.88	3
Against	5,348	23.12	1
Invalid/blank votes	137	-	–
Total	25,606	100	4
Registered voters/turnout	40,538	63.17	–
Source: Direct Democracy

=== Alternative status ===
If the Compact of Free Association is not approved, I recommend to the government that it negotiate an agreement with the government of the United States consistent with my preference for the following political status:
[ ] Independence
[ ] A relationship with the United States other than Free Association. You may describe that status

Choice	Votes	%
Independence	13,924	58.04
Commonwealth with the USA	1,319	5.50
US Territory	820	3.42
US State	568	2.37
Unclear	4,771	19.89
Blank	2,587	10.78
Invalid votes	137	-
Total	25,606	100
Registered voters/turnout	40,538	63.17
Source: Direct Democracy
