= 1991 Soviet Union referendum =

Referendum on the New Union Treaty

- 17 March 1991
- Do you consider it necessary to preserve the Union of Soviet Socialist Republics as a renewed federation of equal sovereign republics, in which the rights and freedoms of a person of any nationality will be fully guaranteed?

Results
| Choice | Votes | % |
|---|---|---|
| Yes | 113,512,812 | 77.85% |
| No | 32,303,977 | 22.15% |
| Valid votes | 145,816,789 | 98.14% |
| Invalid or blank votes | 2,757,817 | 1.86% |
| Total votes | 148,574,606 | 100.00% |
| Registered voters/turnout | 185,647,355 | 80.03% |
- Results by republic and autonomous republic Yes: 70–80% 80–90% 90–100%

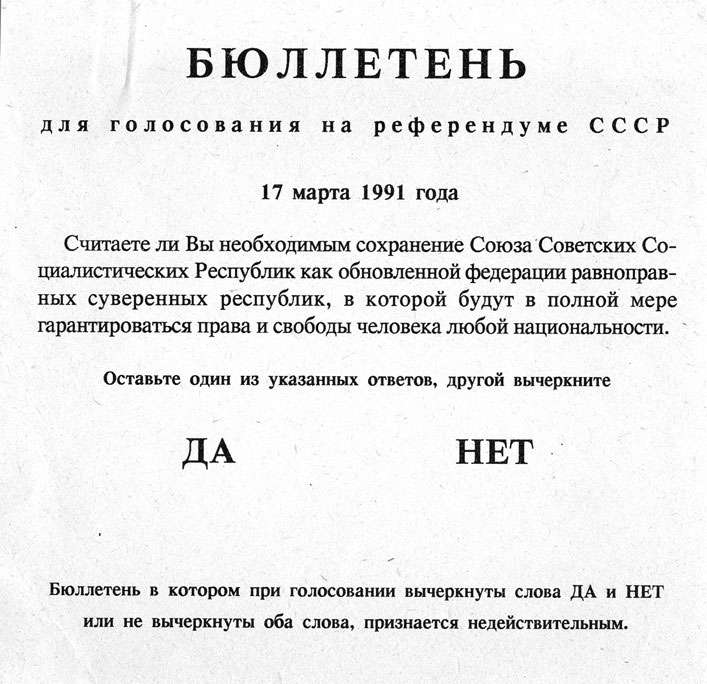
Voting bulletin

A referendum on the future of the Soviet Union was held on 17 March 1991 across the Soviet Union. It was the only national referendum in the history of the Soviet Union, although it was boycotted by authorities in six of the fifteen Soviet republics.

The referendum asked whether to approve a new Union Treaty among the republics, to replace the 1922 treaty that created the USSR. The question put to most voters was:

Do you consider necessary the preservation of the Union of Soviet Socialist Republics as a renewed federation of equal sovereign republics in which the rights and freedom of an individual of any ethnicity will be fully guaranteed?

In Kazakhstan, the wording of the referendum was changed by substituting "equal sovereign states" for "equal sovereign republics".

In Uzbekistan, Ukraine and Kirghizia (modern day Kyrgyzstan) additional questions were asked about sovereignty and independence of these republics.

While the vote was boycotted by the authorities in Armenia, Estonia, Georgia (though not in the ASSRs of Abkhazia and South Ossetia), Latvia, Lithuania, and Moldova (though not in Transnistria and Gagauzia), turnout was 80% across the rest of the Soviet Union.

The referendum's question was approved by nearly 80% of voters in all nine other republics that took part. However, the August coup attempt by hardliners of the Communist Party prevented the anticipated signing of the New Union Treaty that was due to take place the next day. Although it failed, the coup attempt reduced confidence in Gorbachev's central government. It was followed by a series of referendums for independence in individual republics and led to the dissolution of the Soviet Union on 26 December 1991.

== Question ==
The following question was asked:

| English | Russian | Ukrainian | Belarusian | Uzbek | Kazakh | Georgian | Azerbaijani | Lithuanian | "Moldavian" (Romanian) | Latvian | Kirghiz | Tajik | Armenian | Turkmen | Estonian |
|---|---|---|---|---|---|---|---|---|---|---|---|---|---|---|---|
| Do you consider it necessary to preserve the USSR as a renewed federation of equal sovereign republics, which will be fully ensured of human rights and freedoms of any nationality? | Считаете ли Вы необходимым сохранение Союза Советских Социалистических Республик как обновлённой федерации равноправных суверенных республик, в которой будут в полной мере гарантироваться права и свободы человека любой национальности? | Чи вважаєте ви за необхідне збереження Союзу Радянських Соціалістичних Республік як оновленої федерації рівноправних суверенних республік, у якій будуть повною мірою гарантуватися права і свободи людини будь-якої національності? | Ці лічыце вы неабходным захаванне СССР як абноўленай федэрацыі раўнапраўных суверэнных рэспублік, у якой будуць поўнасцю забяспечаны правы і свабоды чалавека любой нацыянальнасці? | Сиз СССРни ҳар қандай миллатнинг инсон ҳуқуқлари ва эркинликлари тўлиқ таъминланадиган тенг ҳуқуқли суверен республикаларнинг янгиланган федерацияси сифатида сақлаб қолишни зарур деб ҳисоблайсизми? | Кез келген ұлттың адам құқықтары мен бостандықтары толық қамтамасыз етілетін тең құқылы егеменді республикалардың жаңарған федерациясы ретінде КСРО-ны сақтау қажет деп санайсыз ба? | თვლით თუ არა საჭიროდ სსრკ-ს შენარჩუნებას, როგორც თანაბარი სუვერენული რესპუბლიკების განახლებულ ფედერაციას, რომელიც სრულად იქნება უზრუნველყოფილი ნებისმიერი ეროვნების ადამიანის უფლებათა და თავისუფლებებით? | Истанилан миллатин инсан ҳүқуқ ва азадлықларыны там тамин эдаcак барабарҳүқуқлу суверен республикаларын јениланмиш федерасиясы кими ССРИ-ни қоруюб сахламағы зарури ҳесаб эдирсинизми? | Ar manote, kad būtina išsaugoti SSRS kaip atnaujintą lygių suverenių respublikų federaciją, kuriai bus visiškai užtikrintos bet kurios tautybės žmogaus teisės ir laisvės? | Консидераци че есте нечесарэ пэстрареа УРСС ка о федерацие реынноитэ де републичи суверане эгале, каре ва фи пе деплин асигуратэ де дрептуриле ши либертэциле омулуи де ориче националитате? | Vai uzskatāt par nepieciešamu saglabāt PSRS kā atjaunotu vienlīdzīgu suverēnu republiku federāciju, kurai tiks pilnībā nodrošinātas jebkuras tautības cilvēktiesības un brīvības? | Кандай гана улут болбосун адамдын укуктары жана эркиндиктери толук камсыз кылынуучу тец укуктуу суверендуу республикалардын жацыланган федерациясы катары СССРди сактап калуу зарыл деп эсептейсизби? | Оё шумо зарур мешуморед, ки СССР хамчун федерацияи навшудаи республикахои сохибихтиёри баробархукук нигох дошта шавад, ки он хукуку озодихои инсони хар миллат пурра таъмин карда мешавад? | Անհրաժե՞շտ եք համարում պահպանել ԽՍՀՄ-ը որպես իրավահավասար ինքնիշխան հանրապետությունների նորացված դաշնություն, որը լիովին կապահովվի ցանկացած ազգության մարդու իրավունքներով և ազատություններով? | Адам ҳукуклары ве ислендик миллетиң азатлыклары билен долы үпжүн эдилжек деңҳукуклы республикаларың тәзеленен федерациясы ҳөкмүнде СССР-и горап сакламагы зерур ҳасаплаярсыңызмы? | Kas peate vajalikuks säilitada NSV Liit kui võrdväärsete suveräänsete vabariikide uuendatud föderatsioon, millele on täielikult tagatud mis tahes rahvusest inimõigused ja vabadused? |

== Overview ==
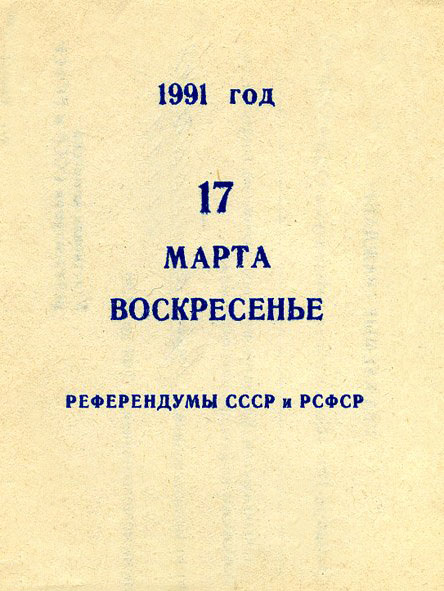
Voter invitation in the RSFSR

On 24 December 1990, deputies of the 4th Congress of People's Deputies, having voted by name, decided to consider it necessary to preserve the USSR as a renewed federation of equal sovereign republics, which will be fully ensured human rights and freedoms of any nationality. The referendum considered five questions:

- Do you consider it necessary to preserve the USSR as a renewed federation of equal sovereign republics, which will be fully ensured of human rights and freedoms of any nationality? (Yes/No)
- Do you consider it necessary to preserve the USSR as a single state? (Yes/No)
- Do you consider it necessary to preserve the socialist system in the USSR? (Yes/No)
- Do you consider it necessary to preserve the Soviet government in the renewed Union? (Yes/No)
- Do you feel the need to safeguard the Union in the renewed human rights and freedoms of any nationality? (Yes/No) (Any legal or legislative consequences, in case of acceptance of, or otherwise, was not specified)

On the same day, at the initiative and insistence of General Secretary and President Mikhail Gorbachev, the Congress adopted two decisions on holding a referendum on the private ownership of land [6] and on the preservation of the Union as a renewed federation of equal sovereign of Soviet Socialist Republics [7]. For the adoption of the first resolution voted in 1553 deputies, against - 84, abstained - 70. For the adoption of the second resolution voted in 1677 deputies, against - 32, abstained - 66.

However, concerning the first decision the Chairman YH Kalmykov later explained at a session of the Supreme Soviet of the USSR Supreme Council Committee for Legislation, the president asked to refrain from holding a referendum on the issue of private property.

Second course was given to the decree. The first was No. 1856-1 "On holding a referendum of the USSR on the issue of the Union of Soviet Socialist Republics", dated 24 December 1990:

[...] due to numerous appeals of workers expressed concern about the fate of the USSR, and given that the preservation of a single union state is the most important issue of public life, affects the interests of each person, all the Soviet Union's population, the Congress of People's Deputies USSR decided:

1. To conduct a referendum of the USSR to address the issue of maintaining the Union as a renewed federation of equal sovereign Soviet Socialist Republics, taking into account the results of voting for each country separately.
2. To instruct the USSR Supreme Council set a date for the referendum and ensure its measures.

–Resolution of the USSR from LICs December 24, 1990 No. 1856-1

On 27 December 1990, Congress of People's Deputies of the USSR decided enact the law "On the popular vote (Soviet Union referendum)", effective immediately. Article 5 of the Law specifies that the right to call a referendum belongs to the Congress of People's Deputies of the USSR, and on matters not related to the exclusive jurisdiction of the USSR Congress of People's Deputies, in the period between congresses – to the Supreme Soviet of the USSR.

On 16 January 1991 the Supreme Council of USSR published Resolution 1910-1 "On the organization and measures to ensure the holding of a referendum of the USSR on the issue of preserving the Union of Soviet Socialist Republics".

Based on the fact that no one, except the people can not take the historical responsibility for the fate of the USSR, pursuant to the decision of the fourth Congress of People's Deputies of the USSR in accordance with the law on the referendum of the USSR. [...] The Supreme Council decides to:

1. Carry out the entire territory of the Soviet Union on Sunday, 17 March 1991, for the Soviet Union referendum on the preservation of the Soviet Union as a federation of equal republics.
2. Turn on the ballot for secret voting the following wording of the question put to referendum, and the answers of voting:
  "Do you consider it necessary to preserve the Union of Soviet Socialist Republics as a renewed federation of equal sovereign republics, which will fully guarantee the rights and freedoms of all nationalities."
  "Yes or no".
3. To determine the results of voting by the Union Soviet Socialist Republic as a whole, taking into account the results of voting for each country separately.

–Resolution of the USSR Supreme Soviet of 16 January 1991 № 1910-1

== Results ==
| Choice | Votes | % |
|---|---|---|
| For | 113,512,812 | 77.85 |
| Against | 32,303,977 | 22.15 |
| Total | 145,816,789 | 100.00 |
| Valid votes | 145,816,789 | 98.14 |
| Invalid/blank votes | 2,757,817 | 1.86 |
| Total votes | 148,574,606 | 100.00 |
| Registered voters/turnout | 185,647,355 | 80.03 |
Source: Nohlen & Stöver

=== In participating republics ===
| Republic or subdivision of republic | For | | Against | | Invalid votes | Total votes | Registered voters | Turnout |
| Republic or subdivision of republic | Votes | % | Votes | % | Invalid votes | Total votes | Registered voters | Turnout |
|---|---|---|---|---|---|---|---|---|
| Russian SFSR | 56,860,067 | 73.00 | 21,030,753 | 27.00 | 1,809,633 | 79,701,169 | 105,643,364 | 75.44 |
| Adygea | | 83.23 | | | | | | 73.23 |
| Aga-Buryatia | | 91.9 | | | | | | 87.7 |
| Altai | | 79.82 | | | | | | 77.92 |
| Amur | | 80.7 | | | | | | 76.66 |
| Astrakhan | | 75.9 | | | | | | 72.39 |
| Bashkiria | 1,908,875 | 85.9 | 269,007 | 12.1 | 43,276 | 2,221,158 | 2,719,637 | 81.7 |
| Belgorod | | 80.7 | | | | | | 87.43 |
| Astrakhan | | 80.28 | | | | | | 81.45 |
| Buryatia | 447,438 | 83.5 | 78,167 | 14.6 | 10,197 | 535,802 | 668,231 | 80.2 |
| Chelyabinsk | | 62.96 | | | | | | 76.36 |
| Chita | | 84.3 | | | | | | 79.96 |
| Chukchi | | 69.76 | | | | | | 73.07 |
| Dagestan | 670,488 | 82.6 | 131,522 | 16.2 | 9,999 | 812,009 | 1,008,626 | 80.5 |
| Evenk | | 77.05 | | | | | | 76.11 |
| Gorno-Altai | | 89.08 | | | | | | 85.42 |
| Jewish Autonomous Oblast | | 80.31 | | | | | | 60.06 |
| Kabardino-Balkaria | 290,380 | 77.9 | 77,339 | 20.8 | 4,888 | 372,607 | 489,436 | 76.1 |
| Kaliningrad | | 76.46 | | | | | | 75.64 |
| Kalmykia | 148,462 | 87.8 | 17,833 | 10.5 | 2,829 | 169,124 | 204,301 | 82.8 |
| Kaluga | | 73.61 | | | | | | 81.94 |
| Kamchatka | | 64.36 | | | | | | 70.32 |
| Karachay-Cherkessia | | 82.59 | | | | | | 85.69 |
| Karelia | 317,854 | 76.0 | 92,703 | 22.0 | 7,544 | 418,101 | 551,644 | 75.8 |
| Kemerovo | | 67.64 | | | | | | 69.83 |
| Khabarovsk | | 68.96 | | | | | | 67.82 |
| Khakassia | | 75.83 | | | | | | 72.57 |
| Khanty-Mansi | | 62.59 | | | | | | 59.75 |
| Kirov Oblast | | 73.8 | | | | | | 78.59 |
| Komi | 412,842 | 76.0 | 119,678 | 22.0 | 10,883 | 543,403 | 797,049 | 75.44 |
| Komi-Permyak | | 87.34 | | | | | | 81.87 |
| Koryak | | 75.45 | | | | | | 78.59 |
| Kostroma | | 79.13 | | | | | | 80.18 |
| Krasnodar | | 80.32 | | | | | | 74.59 |
| Krasnoyarsk | | 70.12 | | | | | | 72.96 |
| Kurgan | | 76.99 | | | | | | 82.24 |
| Kursk | | 81.33 | | | | | | 84.98 |
| Leningrad | | 69.85 | | | | | | 73.92 |
| Lipetsk | | 72.65 | | | | | | 83.8 |
| Magadan | | 63.68 | | | | | | 66.35 |
| Mari | 333,319 | 79.6 | 77,239 | 18.5 | 8,041 | 418,599 | 525,685 | 79.6 |
| Mordovia | 459,021 | 80.3 | 101,886 | 17.8 | 10,724 | 571,631 | 677,706 | 84.3 |
| Moscow | | 50.02 | | | | | | 67.95 |
| Moscow Oblast | | 63.83 | | | | | | 74.48 |
| Murmansk | | 66.08 | | | | | | 71.82 |
| Nenets | | 78.25 | | | | | | 75.89 |
| Nizhny Novgorod | | 66.88 | | | | | | 74 |
| North Ossetia | 331,823 | 90.2 | 32,786 | 8.9 | 3,249 | 367,858 | 428,307 | 85.9 |
| Novgorod | | 74.45 | | | | | | 74.88 |
| Novosibirsk | | 69.32 | | | | | | 70.74 |
| Omsk | | 75.05 | | | | | | 80.21 |
| Oryol | | 80.03 | | | | | | 82.95 |
| Orenburg | | 79.94 | | | | | | 78.39 |
| Penza | | 75.91 | | | | | | 85.16 |
| Perm | | 64.89 | | | | | | 71.16 |
| Primorye | | 64.12 | | | | | | 71.57 |
| Pskov | | 82.68 | | | | | | 83.21 |
| Rostov | | 73.48 | | | | | | 77.03 |
| Ryazan | | 77.55 | | | | | | 83.27 |
| Saint Petersburg | | 50.54 | | | | | | 64.89 |
| Sakhalin | | 73.14 | | | | | | 73.68 |
| Samara | | 70.39 | | | | | | 73.74 |
| Saratov | | 73.11 | | | | | | 79.18 |
| Smolensk | | 82.36 | | | | | | 81.55 |
| Stavropol | | 79.29 | | | | | | 83.17 |
| Sverdlovsk | | 49.33 | | | | | | 73.58 |
| Tambov | | 82.72 | | | | | | 84.34 |
| Tatarstan | 1,708,193 | 87.5 | 211,516 | 10.8 | 32,059 | 1,951,768 | 2,532,383 | 77.1 |
| Taymyr | | 71.07 | | | | | | 75.13 |
| Tomsk | | 63.89 | | | | | | 71.64 |
| Tula | | 71.31 | | | | | | 77.37 |
| Tuva | 126,598 | 91.4 | 9,404 | 6.8 | 2,494 | 138,496 | 171,731 | 80.6 |
| Tver | | 78.73 | | | | | | 81.42 |
| Tyumen | | 74.77 | | | | | | 71.6 |
| Udmurtia | 622,714 | 76.0 | 180,289 | 22.0 | 16,137 | 819,140 | 1,103,083 | 74.3 |
| Ulyanovsk | | 79.03 | | | | | | 79.21 |
| Ust-Orda Buryatia | | 88.6 | | | | | | 88.11 |
| Vladimir | | 68.64 | | | | | | 78.5 |
| Volgograd | | 66.23 | | | | | | 71.53 |
| Vologda | | 68.91 | | | | | | 76.28 |
| Voronezh | | 75.06 | | | | | | 81.25 |
| Checheno-Ingushetia | 318,059 | 75.9 | 94,737 | 22.6 | 6,216 | 419,012 | 712,139 | 58.8 |
| Chuvashia | 616,387 | 82.4 | 113,249 | 15.1 | 18,784 | 748,420 | 900,913 | 81.3 |
| Yakutia | 415,712 | 76.7 | 116,798 | 21.6 | 9,483 | 541,993 | 688,679 | 78.7 |
| Yamalo-Nenets | | 61.77 | | | | | | 66.46 |
| Yaroslavl | | 71.25 | | | | | | 74.8 |
| Byelorussia | 5,069,313 | 83.72 | 986,079 | 16.28 | 71,591 | 6,126,983 | 7,354,796 | 83.31 |
| Ukraine | 22,110,899 | 71.48 | 8,820,089 | 28.52 | 583,256 | 31,514,244 | 37,732,178 | 83.52 |
| Cherkasy | | 77.3 | | 21.4 | | | 1,140,506 | 87.9 |
| Chernihiv | | 83.3 | | 15.2 | | | 1,064,982 | 90.5 |
| Chernivtsi | | 60.8 | | 36.0 | | | 663,781 | 88.3 |
| Crimea | | 87.6 | | 11.1 | | | 1,561,785 | 79.3 |
| Dnipropetrovsk | | 77.5 | | 21.1 | | | 2,861,060 | 78.7 |
| Donetsk | | 84.5 | | 14.1 | | | 3,847,204 | 80.0 |
| Ivano-Frankivsk | | 18.2 | | 78.3 | | | 1,004,728 | 78.3 |
| Kharkiv | | 75.7 | | 22.4 | | | 2,382,196 | 78.4 |
| Kherson | | 81.0 | | 17.8 | | | 896,364 | 84.9 |
| Khmelnytskyi | | 77.7 | | 20.9 | | | 1,124,588 | 91.3 |
| Kirovohrad | | 82.4 | | 16.3 | | | 919,084 | 86.6 |
| Kyiv | | 44.6 | | 52.9 | | | 1,903,152 | 71.5 |
| Kyiv Oblast | | 66.9 | | 31.2 | | | 1,416,600 | 83.7 |
| Luhansk | | 86.3 | | 12.6 | | | 2,084,235 | 85.4 |
| Lviv | | 16.4 | | 80.1 | | | 1,997,543 | 89.4 |
| Mykolaiv | | 84.2 | | 14.4 | | | 966,419 | 85.0 |
| Odesa | | 82.1 | | 16.2 | | | 1,891,822 | 78.4 |
| Poltava | | 78.8 | | 19.9 | | | 1,301,432 | 90.2 |
| Rivne | | 54.3 | | 42.9 | | | 804,447 | 87.5 |
| Sevastopol | | 83.1 | | 15.2 | | | 316,421 | 74.7 |
| Sumy | | 78.8 | | 19.6 | | | 1,070,124 | 87.3 |
| Ternopil | | 19.3 | | 76.5 | | | 854,671 | 91.2 |
| Vinnytsia | | 81.2 | | 17.7 | | | 1,417,087 | 90.7 |
| Volyn | | 53.7 | | 43.2 | | | 751,268 | 87.6 |
| Zakarpattia | | 60.2 | | 36.3 | | | 842,159 | 82.2 |
| Zaporizhzhia | | 79.8 | | 18.8 | | | 1,542,498 | 80.2 |
| Zhytomyr | | 81.6 | | 17.0 | | | 1,105,938 | 88.3 |
| Gagauzia (Moldavia) | | | | | | | | |
| Transnistria (Moldavia) | | | | | | | | |
| Abkhazia (Georgia) | 164,231 | 98.5 | 1,566 | 0.9 | 747 | 166,544 | 318,317 | 52.3 |
| South Ossetia (Georgia) | | | | | | | | |
| Azerbaijan | 2,709,246 | 94.12 | 169,225 | 5.88 | 25,326 | 2,903,797 | 3,866,659 | 75.10 |
| Nakhichevan | 31,328 | 87.3 | 3,620 | 10.1 | 918 | 35,866 | 174,364 | 20.6 |
| Kazakhstan | 8,295,519 | 95.00 | 436,560 | 5.00 | 84,464 | 8,816,543 | 9,999,433 | 88.17 |
| Kirghizia | 2,057,971 | 95.98 | 86,246 | 4.02 | 30,377 | 2,174,593 | 2,341,646 | 92.87 |
| Tajikistan | 2,315,755 | 96.85 | 75,300 | 3.15 | 16,497 | 2,407,552 | 2,549,096 | 94.45 |
| Turkmenistan | 1,766,584 | 98.26 | 31,203 | 1.74 | 6,531 | 1,804,310 | 1,846,310 | 97.66 |
| Uzbekistan | 9,196,848 | 94.73 | 511,373 | 5.27 | 108,112 | 9,816,333 | 10,287,938 | 95.42 |
| Karakalpakstan | 563,916 | 97.6 | 10,133 | 1.8 | 3,668 | 577,717 | 584,208 | 98.9 |
Source: Report from the Central Commission of the USSR Referendum, Seventeen Moments in Soviet History, Association of People's Deputies of Ukraine

=== In republics not participating in the Soviet referendums ===
An official referendum had been held in Estonia on 3 March 1991 on whether to restore the Estonian republic that had been occupied by the Soviet Union in 1940. The result was 77.8% in favour of restoring the Estonian republic. Latvia also held an official referendum on 3 March 1991, when the overwhelming majority voted to restore the independent Latvian republic. Lithuania had held a referendum on 9 February 1991, in which 93% of voters had approved independence.

Georgia was to hold its own independence referendum two weeks later, and Armenia on 21 September. In both cases, 99.5% of voters approved of the declarations of independence.

Consequently, in these republics, pro-Soviet front-organisations organised voluntary referendums without official sanction. Turnout of voting here was considerably less than 50% of the franchised voters of these countries, but this information was not included in the official statement of the Central Commission of the Referendum of USSR.

| Republic and Autonomous Oblast | For | | Against | | Invalid votes | Total votes | Registered voters (not equal to franchised voters) | Turnout (based on registered, not franchised voters) |
| Republic and Autonomous Oblast | Votes | % | Votes | % | Invalid votes | Total votes | Registered voters (not equal to franchised voters) | Turnout (based on registered, not franchised voters) |
|---|---|---|---|---|---|---|---|---|
| Armenia | 2,541 | 72.46 | 966 | 27.54 | 42 | 3,549 | 4,923 | 72.09 |
| Nagorno-Karabakh (Azerbaijan) | | | | | | | | |
| Georgia (Note: Referendum was held only in Abkhazia and South Ossetia) | 43,950 | 99.98 | 9 | 0.02 | 53 | 44,012 | 45,696 | 96.31 |
| Moldova | 688,905 | 98.72 | 8,916 | 1.28 | 3,072 | 700,893 | 841,507 | 83.29 |
| Estonia | 211,090 | 95.46 | 10,040 | 4.54 | 1,110 | 222,240 | 299,681 | 74.16 |
| Latvia | 415,147 | 95.84 | 18,015 | 4.16 | 3,621 | 436,783 | 670,828 | 65.11 |
| Lithuania | 496,050 | 99.13 | 4,355 | 0.87 | 970 | 436,783 | 582,262 | 86.11 |
Source: Direct Democracy

== Additional questions ==
In several of the republics, additional questions were added to the ballot. In Russia, an additional question was asked on whether an elective post of the president of Russia should be created. In Kirghizia, Ukraine and Uzbekistan the additional question was on the sovereignty of their republics as part of a new union.

=== Kirghizia ===
In Kirghizia, voters were also asked "Do you agree that the Republic of Kirghizistan should be in the renewed Union as a sovereign republic with equal rights?" It was approved by 62.2% of voters, although turnout was lower at 81.7%, compared to 92.9% in the Union-wide referendum.

| Choice | Votes | % |
|---|---|---|
| For | | 62.2 |
| Against | | 37.8 |
| Total | | |
Source: Nohlen et al.

=== Ukraine ===
In Ukraine, voters were also asked "Do you agree that Ukraine should be part of a Union of Soviet sovereign states on the basis on the Declaration of State Sovereignty of Ukraine?" The proposal was approved by 81.7% of voters.

| Choice | Votes | % |
|---|---|---|
| For | 25,224,687 | 81.69 |
| Against | 5,655,701 | 18.31 |
| Total | 30,880,388 | 100.00 |
| Valid votes | 30,880,388 | 98.14 |
| Invalid/blank votes | 584,703 | 1.86 |
| Total votes | 31,465,091 | 100.00 |
| Registered voters/turnout | 37,689,767 | 83.48 |
Source: Nohlen & Stöver

At the same day a referendum in the Galician oblasts Ivano-Frankivsk, Lviv, and Ternopil asked the three regions of the USSR about the creation of independent state of Ukraine. 88% of the voters in this referendum supported Ukraine's independence.

8.5 months later, all of Ukraine held an independence referendum on 1 December, in which 92% voted for independence.

=== Uzbekistan ===
In Uzbekistan, voters were also asked "Do you agree that Uzbekistan should remain part of a renewed Union (federation) as a sovereign republic with equal rights?" It was approved by 94.9% of voters, with a turnout of 95.5%. On 29 December 98% of Uzbeks would vote for full independence.

| Choice | Votes | % |
|---|---|---|
| For | | 94.9 |
| Against | | 5.1 |
| Total | | |
| Total votes | 9,824,304 | – |
| Registered voters/turnout | 10,287,938 | 95.49 |
Source: Nohlen et al.

== Aftermath ==
Following the referendum, an agreement between the Soviet central government and nine republics — known as the 9+1 agreement — was signed in Novo-Ogaryovo on 23 April 1991. The New Union Treaty that resulted would have converted the Soviet Union into a confederation of independent republics with a common president, foreign policy, and military. The New Union Treaty was fully prepared and scheduled to be signed on 20 August 1991, but the signing was prevented by the State Emergency Committee coup. The coup of August 1991 was timed specifically to prevent the signing of the treaty. After the coup failed by 21 August, Gorbachev returned to Moscow and reluctantly agreed to the dissolution of the Communist Party. Boris Yeltsin then proceeded to abolish or take over the institutions of the Soviet Union. Most Soviet republics subsequently adopted declarations of independence. Ukraine's independence referendum on 1 December 1991, in which 92% voted for independence, is widely considered the most immediate event that led to the collapse of the Soviet Union. The Soviet Union formally dissolved on 26 December 1991.

== See also ==
- Dissolution of the Soviet Union
