= 1975 Trust Territory of the Pacific Islands status referendum =

A referendum on the future status of the islands was held in the Trust Territory of the Pacific Islands on 8 July 1975. Voters were offered six options:

1. Independence
2. Commonwealth
3. Free Association
4. Statehood
5. To retain the current status
6. Another status

In Chuuk, Kosrae, Pohnpei and Yap (later to become the Federated States of Micronesia) option one (independence) received the highest number of votes in favour (59.1%), whilst Free Association (58.0%) and the present status (59.0%) also received majorities in favour. Voter turnout was 52.6%. In the Marshall Islands option five was the only option to be approved, with 77% voting in favour, although voter turnout was only 35.2%. In Palau only options three (68% in favour) and five (78% in favour) were approved.

== Results ==
=== Chuuk, Kosrae, Pohnpei and Yap ===
| Choice | For | | Against | | Invalid/ blank votes | Total | Registered voters | Turnout |
| Choice | Votes | % | Votes | % | Invalid/ blank votes | Total | Registered voters | Turnout |
|---|---|---|---|---|---|---|---|---|
| Independence | 6,912 | 59.1 | 4,778 | 40.9 | 5,849 | 17,539 | 33,329 | 52.6 |
| Commonwealth | 714 | 9.2 | 7,015 | 90.8 | 9,810 | 17,539 | 33,329 | 52.6 |
| Free Association | 5,759 | 58.0 | 4,164 | 42.0 | 7,616 | 17,539 | 33,329 | 52.6 |
| Statehood | 545 | 6.5 | 7,807 | 93.5 | 9,187 | 17,539 | 33,329 | 52.6 |
| Current status | 6,543 | 59.0 | 4,549 | 41.0 | 6,447 | 17,539 | 33,329 | 52.6 |
| Another status | 42 | 1.6 | 2,546 | 98.4 | 14,951 | 17,539 | 33,329 | 52.6 |
Source: Nohlen et al.

=== Marshall Islands ===
| Choice | For | | Against | | Invalid/ blank votes | Total | Registered voters | Turnout |
| Choice | Votes | % | Votes | % | Invalid/ blank votes | Total | Registered voters | Turnout |
|---|---|---|---|---|---|---|---|---|
| Independence | 119 | 5.2 | 2,175 | 94.8 | 943 | 3,237 | 9,203 | 35.2 |
| Commonwealth | 409 | 15.1 | 2,300 | 84.9 | 528 | 3,237 | 9,203 | 35.2 |
| Free Association | 826 | 30.0 | 1,926 | 70.0 | 485 | 3,237 | 9,203 | 35.2 |
| Statehood | 199 | 8.0 | 2,302 | 92.0 | 736 | 3,237 | 9,203 | 35.2 |
| Current status | 2,317 | 77.1 | 687 | 22.9 | 233 | 3,237 | 9,203 | 35.2 |
| Another status | 129 | 6.0 | 2,011 | 94.0 | 1,097 | 3,237 | 9,203 | 35.2 |
Source: Nohlen et al.

=== Palau ===
| Choice | For | | Against | | Invalid/ blank votes | Total | Registered voters | Turnout |
| Choice | Votes | % | Votes | % | Invalid/ blank votes | Total | Registered voters | Turnout |
|---|---|---|---|---|---|---|---|---|
| Independence | 455 | 34.37 | 869 | 65.63 | 1,162 | 2,486 | 5,888 | 42.22 |
| Commonwealth | 171 | 15.89 | 905 | 84.11 | 1,410 | 2,486 | 5,888 | 42.22 |
| Free Association | 1,120 | 68.04 | 526 | 31.96 | 840 | 2,486 | 5,888 | 42.22 |
| Statehood | 183 | 17.22 | 880 | 82.78 | 1,423 | 2,486 | 5,888 | 42.22 |
| Current status | 1,288 | 77.68 | 370 | 22.32 | 1,658 | 2,486 | 5,888 | 42.22 |
| Another status | 38 | 4.80 | 754 | 95.20 | 1,694 | 2,486 | 5,888 | 42.22 |
Source: Direct Democracy
