= 2004 Saban status referendum =

- 5 November 2004

Results
Choice	Votes	%
Remain in the Netherlands Antilles	85	13.18%
Direct ties with the Netherlands	555	86.05%
Independence	5	0.78%
Valid votes	645	96.85%
Invalid or blank votes	21	3.15%
Total votes	666	100.00%
Registered voters/turnout	856	77.8%

A status referendum was held on the island of Saba on 5 November 2004, in order to determine its future with the Netherlands and within the Netherlands Antilles. This referendum was a non-binding advisory option. The ruling and opposition parties supported the option for direct constitutional relations with the Netherlands, which won.

== Background ==
Saba was one of five islands in the Netherlands Antilles alongside Curaçao, Sint Maarten, Bonaire, and Sint Eustatius. The Netherlands Antilles, which was based in Curaçao, was criticised for ignoring the smaller island members.

Referendums were held in all member islands of the Netherlands Antilles to determine their future with the Netherlands. The options presented in these referendums were direct constitutional relations, maintaining the status quo in the Netherlands Antilles, or independence. All of these referendums were non-binding and only served as advisory recommendations to the States General of the Netherlands.

== Campaign ==
The ruling and opposition parties of Saba, the Windward Islands People's Movement and Saba United Democratic Party, supported voting for direct constitutional relations with the Netherlands.

The Saba Referendum Committee held a town hall meeting on 1 November 2004, and a mock vote on 4 November. Two polling locations were used for the election, one in The Bottom and one in Windwardside.

Turnout in the referendum was 77.80%. 86.05% of the population voted for closer links to the Netherlands, remaining a part of the Netherlands Antilles received 13.18% of the vote, and independence received 0.78% of the vote.

== Results ==
Choice	Votes	%
Direct constitutional ties with the Netherlands	555	86.05
Remain part of the Netherlands Antilles	85	13.18
Independence	5	0.78
Total	645	100.00
Valid votes	645	96.85
Invalid/blank votes	21	3.15
Total votes	666	100.00
Registered voters/turnout	856	77.80

== See also ==
- Dissolution of the Netherlands Antilles
  - 2000 Sint Maarten status referendum
  - 2004 Bonaire status referendum
  - 2005 Curaçao status referendum
  - 2005 Sint Eustatius status referendum

== Works cited ==
=== News ===
- "Saba votes on Dutch relations". BBC News. 4 November 2004. Archived from the original on 6 May 2026.
- "Saba voters go for breakaway". BBC News. 6 November 2004. Archived from the original on 6 May 2026.

=== Web ===
- "Implementation of the International Covenant on Economic, Social and Cultural Rights". United Nations Economic and Social Council. 13 July 2009. Archived from the original on 6 May 2026.
- "Referendum on the Constitutional Future of Saba". Saba Tourism. Archived from the original on 30 December 2006.
