= 1976 Guamanian status referendum =

Guamanian ballot measure

A referendum on the territory's status was held in Guam on 4 September 1976. Voters were presented with a range of options, with "improved status quo" receiving the support of 58%.

== Results ==
Choice	Votes	%
Improved status quo	10,221	58.05
US State		24.00
US Territory (status quo)		9.00
Independence		6.00
Other status		3.00
Total		
Source: Direct Democracy
