= 1983 Marshallese Compact of Free Association referendum =

7 September 1983

Do you approve of the Compact of Free Association and its related Agreements?
For	57.95%
Against	42.05%

If the Compact of Free Association is not approved, I recommend to the government that it negotiate an agreement with the government of the United States consistent with my preference for the following political status: [ ] Independence [ ] A relationship with the United States other than Free Association. You may describe that status.
Independence	4.41%
Status other than Free Association	24.83%
Blank	70.76%

A referendum on the Compact of Free Association was held in the Marshall Islands on 7 September 1983. Voters were asked whether they approved of the Compact of Free Association with the United States, and if not, what status they preferred. The Compact was approved by 58.0% of voters, rendering the outcome of the second question irrelevant.

== Results ==
=== Free Association with the USA ===
Do you approve of the Compact of Free Association and its related Agreements?

Choice	Votes	%
For	6,215	58.0
Against	4,509	42.0
Invalid/blank votes		-
Total	10,724	100
Source: Nohlen et al.

=== Status ===
If the Compact of Free Association is not approved, I recommend to the government that it negotiate an agreement with the government of the United States consistent with my preference for the following political status:
[ ] Independence
[ ] A relationship with the United States other than Free Association. You may describe that status.

Choice	Votes	%
Independence	474	4.41
Status other than Free Association	2,668	24.83
Blank votes	7,602	70.76
Invalid votes		-
Total	10,724	100
Source: Direct Democracy
