= 1993 Curaçao status referendum =

A status referendum was held on the island of Curaçao on 19 November 1993. The referendum was the result of a discussion about the future of the Netherlands Antilles, following the secession of Aruba in 1986. While most politicians, including the government of the Netherlands Antilles and the island government campaigned in favour of secession to make it form a country of its own within the Kingdom of the Netherlands, the option of retaining and restructuring the Netherlands Antilles received the most votes. This resulted in the rise of the Party for the Restructured Antilles, which won the 1994 general elections in the Netherlands Antilles.

== Result ==
Choice	Votes	%
Option A: Restructuring the Netherlands Antilles	48,587	73.56
Option B: Becoming a self governing country within the Kingdom of the Netherlands	11,841	17.93
Option C: Becoming a direct part of the Netherlands	5,299	8.02
Option D: Independence	325	0.49
Total	66,052	100.00
Registered voters/turnout	118,215	–
Source: Direct Democracy

== See also ==
- Dissolution of the Netherlands Antilles
