= 1983 Palauan Compact of Free Association referendum =

A referendum on the Compact of Free Association was held in Palau on 10 February 1983. Voters were asked three questions:

1. Whether they approved of the Compact of Free Association between Palau and the United States
2. Whether they approved of an agreement which placed restrictions on the US with regard to storing and using radioactive, chemical and biological materials in Palau
3. What their preference for a future political status was if the Free Association (question one) was rejected. They were offered the choice of either "a relationship with the United States closer than Free Association" or independence.

The first two propositions were both approved, nullifying the need for the results of the third. Voter turnout was 78.5%.

== Results ==
=== Question 1 ===
Choice	Votes	%
For	4,452	62.1
Against	2,715	37.9
Invalid/blank votes	79	-
Total	7,246	100
Source: Nohlen et al.

=== Question 2 ===
Choice	Votes	%
For	3,717	52.9
Against	3,309	47.1
Invalid/blank votes	220	-
Total	7,246	100
Source: Nohlen et al.

=== Question 3 ===
Choice	Votes	%
Status closer than Free Association	2,250	55.6
Independence	1,800	44.4
Invalid/blank votes	3,196	-
Total	7,246	100
Source: Nohlen et al.
