= 1994 Bonaire status referendum =

A status referendum was held on the island of Bonaire on 21 October 1994. Voters were asked to choose between the status quo, autonomy within the Netherlands, integration with the Netherlands or independence. The vast majority voted for the status quo, but in a referendum in 2004 finally decided on integration into the Netherlands.

== Results ==
Choice	Votes	%
Status quo	4,443	89.65
Autonomy within the Netherlands	439	8.86
Integration into the Netherlands	63	1.27
Independence	11	0.22
Total	4,956	100.00
Registered voters/turnout	7,450	–
Source: Direct Democracy

== See also ==
- Dissolution of the Netherlands Antilles
