= Anthem without a title =

2000–2010 anthem of the Netherlands Antilles

Anthem of the Netherlands Antilles
- Former anthem of the Netherlands Antilles
- Lyrics: Zahira Hiliman (English); Lucille Berry-Haseth (Papiamentu)
- Music: Zahira Hiliman
- Adopted: 2000
- Relinquished: 10 October 2010

Audio sample
- "Anthem without a title" (instrumental): file; help

The Anthem of the Netherlands Antilles was the untitled anthem of the Netherlands Antilles. It was written in English by Zahira Hiliman from Sint Maarten and translated into the Papiamento language by Lucille Berry-Haseth from Curaçao. The anthem was written in two of the three official languages of the Netherlands Antilles – English and Papiamento, and adopted in 2000. In addition, many of the islands in the Netherlands Antilles had their own regional anthems.

In 2004, an adapted version of the anthem was used by the West Indies national rugby league team before their match against South Africa.

On 10 October 2010, the Netherlands Antilles was dissolved into Curaçao, Sint Maarten and the three public bodies of the Caribbean Netherlands.

== Lyrics ==
Papiamentu lyrics

I
Sinku prenda den laman, e islanan di nos,
dòrnando e korona di un aliansa ideal.
Ounke hende i kultura tur koló nan tin, nos mes a
forma ùn famia den tur libertad.

Bridge:
Pesei nos tur ta alsa bos ku amor i den union

Chorus:
Antia Neerlandes, bunitesa sin igual.
Ku orguyo mi ta defendé mi patria tan stimá.
Antia Neerlandes, p’abo tur mi lealtat.
Pa semper lo mi keda fiel, pais bendishoná

II
Un shelu semper kla, laman ta invitá,
E islanan ta wowo dje kadena di unidat
Idiomanan distinto, papiá ku komprenshon,
Mes ternura: "Sweet Antilles", "Dushi Antia ta".

Bridge

Chorus

III
Ser parti di nos tera, ta orguyo sin midí,
Antia Neerlandes stimá, ku tur sinseridat,
Pues nos ta rearfimá ku amor i dignidat,
ku, dios dilanti, nos ta sirbi huntu nos pais.

Bridge

Chorus

English lyrics

I
Our island in the sea, like gems they seem to be,
outstanding from a golden crown of blissful royalty.
Though their people and their culture colorful may seem,
they yet uniquely blend to be just one family.

Bridge:
So we, your people raise our voice in love and unity

Chorus:
Dear Netherlands Antilles, so beautiful to me.
I’m proud to be a part of you, a patriot I shall be.
Yes Netherlands Antilles, I pledge my loyalty,
To you always will be true; I say may God bless you.

II
So blessed with sunny skies and clear welcoming seas,
each island like a link that forms this chain of unity.
May differ in our language, yet meet on common ground,
When some say "Sweet Antilles", some say "Dushi Antia ta".

Bridge

Chorus

III
Yes, proud are we to be identified with you,
dear Netherlands Antilles, to you we will be true.
So we declare and vow, with dignity and love,
Our nation we will always serve, may God keep us as one.

Bridge

Chorus
