= 1994 Sint Maarten status referendum =

A status referendum was held on the island of Sint Maarten in October 1994. The referendum was the result of a discussion about the future of the Netherlands Antilles, following the secession of Aruba in 1986. While most politicians, including the government of the Netherlands Antilles and the island government campaigned in favour of secession of Sint Maarten to make it form a country of its own within the Kingdom of the Netherlands, the option of retaining and restructuring the Netherlands Antilles came out in favour. This resulted in the rise of the Party for the Restructured Antilles.

== Result ==
Choice	Votes	%
Option A: Sint Maarten remaining part of the Netherlands Antilles	4,697	59.70
Option B: Sint Maarten becoming a self governing country within the Kingdom of the Netherlands	2,606	33.12
Option C: Sint Maarten integrating into the Netherlands	72	0.92
Option D: Sint Maarten becoming an independent country	493	6.27
Total	7,868	100.00
Valid votes	7,868	98.72
Invalid/blank votes	102	1.28
Total votes	7,970	100.00
Registered voters/turnout	12,232	65.16
Source: Country Sint Maarten, The Daily Herald

== See also ==
- Dissolution of the Netherlands Antilles
