= French Union =

1946–1958 political entity of France

French Union Union française (French)
- 1946–1958
- Flag Emblem
- Motto: "Liberté, égalité, fraternité" "Liberty, equality, fraternity"
- Anthem: "La Marseillaise"
- Metropolitan France and overseas departments Overseas territories Associated territories Associated states (obtained independence before 1958)
- Capital: Paris
- Common languages: French
- Historical era: Cold War
  - Fourth Republic: 27 October 1946
  - First Indochina War: 19 December 1946
  - Malagasy Uprising: 29 March 1947
  - French intervention in Korea: 29 July 1950 - 27 July 1953
  - Algerian War: 1 November 1954
  - De facto end of French India: 1 November 1954
  - Austrian State Treaty: 15 May 1955
  - Cameroon War: 22 May 1955
  - Independence of Morocco and Tunisia: 1956
  - Saar Treaty: 27 October 1956
  - Suez Crisis: 29 October – 7 November 1956
  - Fifth Republic; replacement by French Community: 4 October 1958
- Currency: French franc; CFA franc; CFP franc; French Indochinese piastre
Preceded by	Succeeded by
French colonial empire	Overseas France; French Community

The French Union (French: Union française) was a political entity that was an extension of the French Republic to replace the old French imperial system of former colonies, colloquially known as the "French Empire" (Empire français), created by the French Fourth Republic. It was the end of the "indigenous" (indigène) status of French subjects in colonial areas. It was dissolved in 1958, after the downfall of the Fourth Republic.

== Composition ==
The French Union had five components:

1. Metropolitan France, which included the French mainland, Corsica, and the four departments of French Algeria.
2. 'Old' colonies, notably those of the French West Indies in the Caribbean, that became overseas departments in 1946: Guadeloupe, Guiana, Martinique, and Réunion.
3. 'New' colonies, renamed overseas territories: Chad, Comoros, Congo, Dahomey, French India, French Polynesia, French Somaliland, Gabon, Guinea, Ivory Coast, Madagascar, Mauritania, New Caledonia, Niger, Saint Pierre and Miquelon, Senegal, French Sudan, Ubangi-Shari, and Upper Volta.
4. Associated states: three members of French Indochina: Kingdom of Cambodia, Kingdom of Laos, State of Vietnam; and two protectorates of Morocco and Tunisia.
5. United Nations Trust Territories, such as French Cameroons and French Togoland, but not the Mandate for Syria and the Lebanon, which was de facto dissolved in April of 1946. These Trust Territories are the successors of the League of Nations mandates.

== History ==
The first official use of the term Union française appeared in the Declaration on Indochina on 24 March 1945.

The French Union was established by the French constitution of 27 October 1946 (Fourth Republic). Under it, it was said that there were no French colonies, but that metropolitan France, the overseas departments, and the overseas territories combined to create a single French Union, or just one France.

The goal of this union was "assimilation of the overseas territories into a greater France, inhabited by French citizens, and blessed by French culture". Whereas the British colonial system had local colonial governments which would eventually evolve into separate national governments, France wanted to create a single government under a single French state.

This French Union had a President, a High Council, and an Assembly. The President was the President of the Republic. The Assembly of the Union had membership from the Council of the Republic, from the National Assembly and from regional assemblies of the overseas territories and departments but ultimately had no power. The High Council ultimately met only three times, first in 1951. The Assembly was the only actually functioning institution that could manage legislation within the overseas territories.

In reality, the colonial areas had representation but all power remained in the French Parliament and thus was centralized. The colonies had local assemblies but these had only limited local power. Instead, various natives of the overseas territories in metropolitan France grew into a group of elites, known as evolués.

The Associated States of Indochina underwent a process toward independence between 1949 and 1954. The State of Vietnam was founded in 1949 following the Élysée Accords, but it remained partially dependent on France. The Kingdoms of Laos and Cambodia became equal members with France in late 1953. Vietnam became an equal member on 4 June 1954, a month before the communists took power in the North.

On 31 January 1956, in response to the Algerian War, the system changed, abandoning assimilation in favour of autonomy, allowing territories to develop their own local government and eventually gain their independence. This adjustment would not succeed, however, and in 1958 the French Union was replaced by the French Community by Charles de Gaulle's Fifth Republic wherein France was now a federation of states with their own self-government.

== Contemporary views on the French Union ==
The limited democratic reforms and increased investment in the French colonies brought about by the formation of the French Union did receive some support from African leaders at the time. For instance, Félix Houphouet-Boigny, at the time a member of the French National Assembly, was very supportive of France's investment in Côte d'Ivoire through the Central Fund for France Overseas, which disbursed over 600Bn Francs to French colonies. He was also supportive of the greater democratic freedoms that were granted to Africans within the Union, such as new elected territorial assemblies.

Leopold Senghor was similarly supportive of the French Union, and after visiting Côte d'Ivoire in 1952, believed that cooperation between France and its colony was mutually beneficial and that such French assistance should be "extended...to all the territories of the Federation".

Yet more support for the French Union came from French Togoland, now Togo, where in June 1955 the locally elected Territorial Assembly voted unanimously on a motion to remain within France's sphere of influence.

On the other hand, there did exist popular resistance to the French Union. According to Louisa Rice, the increase in the number of African students being educated in France following the Union's formation resulted in a realisation among them of the contradiction between the colonial narrative of equality and reality, thus heightening resistance to its supposedly egalitarian institutions. A concrete example of this resistance occurred on Bastille Day 1952, when a group of West African students returning home by ship were excluded from celebrations due to them travelling in third class. The students argued that they were discriminated against because of their race, yet the ship's captain viewed these allegations with surprise, thinking that their exclusion was merely due to the ship's "interior order which had nothing to do with racist theories". This example is a microcosm of differing contemporary opinions of the French Union. On the one hand there is a view that all citizens of the Union, be they French or African, are equal and are treated as such. On the other, that it was institutionally exclusionary towards Africans, and that despite ostensible changes, the French Union was merely a continuation of colonialism under a new guise.

Furthermore, there was a view among French officials that the French Union constituted an important part of a wider European economic and political project, that is, the European Economic Community (EEC). Indeed, according to Peo Hansen and Stefan Jonsson, at the genesis of the EEC, the integration of Africa into the economic bloc was an important strategic goal for its architects and supporters.

One of these supporters, French Foreign Minister Christian Pineau, said in 1957 that the continued development of Africa by Europe would turn the continent into "an essential factor in world politics", and the alleviation of poverty would help to ward off communist influence. Here we can see that the French Union was viewed by the French government as a useful tool to both consolidate European economic integration and fight the Cold War.

The model of the EEC was also used by African leaders to justify their countries' continued membership of the French Union. For instance, Houphouet-Boigny wrote in 1957 that by "relinquish[ing] a part of their sovereignty", European countries would bring about "a more fully elaborated form of civilization which is more advantageous for their peoples" that goes beyond backward nationalism. Senghor echoes this view, arguing that "it would be pointless to cultivate particularism in Africa", and that instead there should be a goal to remove borders entirely, forming a large economic/political bloc. Here we can see a view that greater integration into economic and political blocs, such as the French Union and the EEC, was viewed by both French officials and some African leaders as progressive, forward thinking, and within their interests to do so.

== Withdrawals from the French Union ==
All three associated states of Vietnam, Cambodia, and Laos withdrew from the French Union in 1954. Over the next two years, they severed the remaining military, monetary and financial ties with France.

- Vietnam withdrew on 20 July 1954. In December 1955, Vietnam terminated its existing economic and financial agreements with France and withdrew its representatives from the French Union Assembly.
- Cambodia withdrew on 25 September 1955.
- Laos withdrew on 11 May 1957 by amending its constitution.

== Youth Council ==
The Youth Council of the French Union (French: Conseil de la jeunesse de l'Union française, abbreviated CJUF) was a coordinating body of youth organizations in the French Union. CJUF was founded in 1950. The organization had its headquarters in Paris and held annual congresses.

== Aftermath of the French Union and the French Community ==
In 1958, the French Fourth Republic was replaced by a new Fifth Republic, characterised by a stronger presidential system, led by President Charles De Gaulle. A constitutional referendum was held on 28 September 1958 to replace the French Union, as part of a wider referendum across the French Union (including the Metropole) on whether to adopt the new French Constitution; if accepted, colonies would become part of the new French Community; if rejected, the territory would be granted independence.

All major political parties in each respective country, except two in Guinea and Niger, supported a yes vote in the 1958 constitutional referendum, seeking a looser form of autonomy rather than the system of close relations dominated by French influence.

The referendum proposal was overwhelmingly approved by upward of 90% of the population in most but not all of the territories. Even in Niger, where the main organised political force opposed the replacing of the French Union with the French Community, the new constitution was supported by a clear majority. However, in Guinea, where the leading political activists preferred immediate and complete independence, the results showed that more than 95% of voters voted against the constitution, with a turnout of 85.5%.

In response to the result in Guinea, French officials destroyed furniture, lightbulbs and windows. Any crockery, medical equipment or documents that could not be carried were also destroyed and over 3,000 French civil servants and army health officials left the country. This only reinforced anti colonial sentiment inside of Guinea, and Ahmed Sékou Touré would continue to urge other African nations to declare independence.

The former west and central African colonies after the passage of the referendum formed a short-lived organisation in 1959 called the Union of Central African Republics, replacing the bloc of French Equatorial Africa that existed as a subsection of the French Union and became part of the new French Community.

Within metropolitan France, most political parties supported the proposed changes to the constitution, most significantly those of ascendant Charles De Gaulle as well as the majority of the French Section of the Workers' International (SFIO, or Socialist Party). Notable opposing forces were the French Communist Party as well as a smaller section of socialists that included the future President of France, François Mitterrand. Opposition to the changes were split between those who wanted complete independence for the African former colonies, mainly those on the French left and then those who opposed any change to the existing system of the French union at all, mostly positioned on the right.

De Gaulle successfully argued that his position on creating a French Community as opposed to the continuance of the French Union, as a sensible and moderate compromise. However, the new French Community did not last long, with most African states leaving the organisation by 1962, preferring complete independence. The French Constitution was changed to remove any mention of the French Community in the 1990s. The Organisation Internationale de la Francophonie is based on promotion of the French language, and includes states and parts of states which were not part of the French Union in 1946 or 1958, or in some cases never French colonies or protectorates.

== See also ==
- CEFEO
- Decolonization
- First Indochina War
- Françafrique
- French colonial empire
- French Community
