= French Community =

1958–1995 federation of former French colonies

French Community Communauté française (French)
- 1958–1995 (De facto: 1958–1960)
- Flag
- Motto: "Liberté, égalité, fraternité" Liberty, equality, fraternity
- Anthem: "La Marseillaise"
- The French Community in 1959
- Capital: Paris
- Common languages: French
- Membership: Central African Republic; Chad; Republic of the Congo; Dahomey; Gabon; France; Ivory Coast; Malagasy Republic; Mauritania; Niger; Senegal; Mali; Republic of Upper Volta
- Historical era: Cold War
  - Fifth Republic: 4 October 1958
  - Abolished: 4 August 1995

Area
- 1959: 11,000,000 km^{2} (4,200,000 sq mi)

Population
  - 1959: 150,000,000
- Currency: French franc; CFA franc; CFP franc
| Preceded by | Succeeded by |
| French Union | Francophonie |

The French Community (French: Communauté française) was the constitutional organization set up in October 1958 between France and its remaining African colonies, then in the process of decolonization. It replaced the French Union, which had reorganized the colonial empire in 1946. While the Community remained formally in existence until 1995, when the French Parliament officially abolished it, it had effectively ceased to exist and function by the end of 1960, by which time all the African members had declared their independence and left it.

The Community had a short lifespan because, while the African members did not refuse it, they refrained from enthusiastic and active involvement. Under the appearance of equality, the constitution of the Community restricted the sovereignty of the twelve African states, and reaffirmed the preeminence of France, by placing in the domaine commun (exercised in common) critical functions such as foreign affairs, defence, the currency, economic policies and control of raw materials.

== Background ==
The constitution of the Fifth Republic, which created the French Community, was a consequence of the Algerian War. Under the 1946 French Union there was said to be no French colonies, but metropolitan France, the overseas departments, and the overseas territories would instead constitute a single French Union, or just one France. In reality, the colonies had little power, with all power remaining centralized in the French Parliament.

On 31 January 1956, an enabling law changed the system, abandoning assimilation in favor of autonomy, to allow territories to develop their own local government and eventually gain their independence. This was an attempt to quell the concerns over Algerian independence. However, this did not stop the demands for independence. The one million French colonists in Algeria were determined to resist any possible Algerian independence, and they made massive demonstrations in Algiers on 13 May 1958. The trouble, which threatened to become a civil war, provoked a political crisis in France and caused the end of the Fourth Republic. General Charles de Gaulle was recalled to power and a new constitution was written. Initially De Gaulle seemed to confirm the Algerian settlers' hopes that he would help them, ending a speech to them with the cry "Vive l'Algérie française !", but privately he indicated that he did not have any intention of maintaining control of nine million Algerians for the benefit of one million settlers. This attitude was manifest in the new constitution, which provided for the right of the overseas territories to request complete independence.

On 28 September 1958 a referendum was held throughout the French Union and the new constitution was approved, by universal suffrage, in all of the territories except French Guinea, which voted instead for the option of complete independence. Under this new constitution, the French Union was replaced by the French Community and France was now a federation of states with their own self-government.

The territorial assemblies of the remaining overseas territories were then allowed four months, dating from the promulgation of the constitution, i.e. until 4 February 1959, to select one of the following options in accordance with articles 76 and 91 of the constitution:

1. Preserve the status of overseas territory.
2. Become a state of the French Community.
3. Become an overseas department (part of the French Republic).

Only Gabon sought to become an overseas department, but was dissuaded from doing so by the French government. The overseas territories of the Comoro Islands, French Polynesia, French Somaliland, New Caledonia, and St Pierre and Miquelon opted to maintain their status, while Chad, French Dahomey, French Sudan, Ivory Coast, Madagascar, Mauritania, Middle Congo, Niger, Senegal, Ubangi-Shari, and Upper Volta chose to become states of the French Community, some of them changing their names in the process.

French Guinea (not to be confused with French Guiana), which refused the Constitution, became independent in 1958. President De Gaulle reacted by ordering French civil servants and technicians to leave Guinea immediately. The French settlers took with them all their valuable equipment, repatriated the French sovereign archives and, above all, economic ties were severed. Despite the difficulties, Sékou Touré affirms "rather freedom in poverty than wealth in slavery".

=== Independences ===
French conservatives were disillusioned with the colonial experience after the disasters in Indochina and Algeria. They wanted to cut all ties to the numerous colonies in French Sub-Saharan Africa. During the war, de Gaulle had successfully based his Free France movement and the African colonies. After a visit in 1958, he made a commitment to make sub-Saharan French Africa a major component of his foreign-policy. The Community did not function fully until 1959. In April 1960, agreements were signed to allow the independence of Madagascar "established in republican form" on 14 October 1958, and of the federation of Mali (which then brought together the Senegal and the Sudanese Republic). While the original version of the Constitution provided that "a Member State of the Community may become independent. It therefore ceases to belong to the Community", the constitutional law of 4 June 1960 provides that a State can become independent and, "by means of agreements", remain a member of the Community. The amendment also provides that an already independent State may join the Community, but this provision was never applied.

During 1960, all member states proclaimed their independence:

- in June, the federation of Mali and the Malagasy Republic become independent within the Community;
- in August, Dahomey, Niger, Upper Volta and Ivory Coast become independent and leave the Community while Chad, Gabon, Central African Republic and Congo become independent within the Community;
- on August 20, Senegal withdraws from the Federation of Mali and then, in September, the Sudanese Republic becomes the Republic of Mali and withdraws from the Community;
- in November, Mauritania becomes independent and leaves the Community.

Although some States did not officially withdraw from the Community, it no longer existed de facto from the end of 1960.

On 16 March 1961 the French prime minister, Michel Debré, and the president of the Senate of the Community, Gaston Monnerville, noted by an exchange of letters the lapse of the constitutional provisions relating to the Community.

However, the provisions of the Constitution relating to the Community were not officially repealed until Chapter IV of Constitutional Law No. 95-880 of 4 August 1995.

== Members ==
Flag of France

By early 1959, the members of the French Community were as follows:

- The French Republic, which was "one and indivisible". All the inhabitants were French citizens and participated with the election of the president of the republic and of the French Parliament. It consisted of:
  - European France, including Corsica (the metropole)
  - Algeria and Sahara. These areas, considered an integral part of France, were divided into departments, 13 in Algeria and 2 in Sahara. All the inhabitants were French citizens, but the Muslims preserved their own juridical status. All sent representatives to the French assemblies and elected municipalities.
  - The overseas departments. Their administration and legislation were in principle those of the metropole, but each of them could receive an individual constitution.
    - French Guiana
    - Guadeloupe and dependencies
    - Martinique
    - Réunion
  - The overseas territories. They had their own individual organisation with a territorial assembly elected by universal suffrage; the assembly appointed a governing council, its president being the governor appointed by the central power. The French Southern and Antarctic Territories, with no permanent population, were administered directly from Paris.
    - Comoro Islands
    - French Polynesia
    - French Somaliland
    - French Southern and Antarctic Territories
    - New Caledonia and dependencies
    - Saint Pierre and Miquelon
- The member states, which were initially:
  - Central African Republic.
  - Chad.
  - Congo (Brazzaville).
  - Dahomey
  - Gabon
  - Ivory Coast
  - Malagasy Republic
  - Mauritania
  - Niger
  - Senegal
  - Sudanese Republic
  - Upper Volta

Although there was only one citizenship of the Community, the territories that became Community member states did not form part of the French Republic, and were granted broad autonomy. They had their own constitutions and could create unions among themselves. The Community's jurisdiction as a whole was limited to foreign policy, defence, the currency, a common economic and financial policy and policy on strategic matters and, except for special agreements, control of justice, higher education, external and public transport and telecommunications. Agreements of Association could also be made by the Community with other states.

Associated with the Community were the United Nations trust territories of French Cameroun and French Togoland, and the Anglo-French condominium of the New Hebrides.

== Institutions ==
Article 91 of the constitution stipulated that the institutions of the Community were to be established by 4 April 1959.
These were as follows:

The President of the Community was the President of the French Republic. The member states also participated with his election and he was represented in each state by a High Commissioner. During 1958 President de Gaulle was elected by an absolute majority in all the states. To promote autonomy within France, de Gaulle gave autonomy to the colonies so that they would stay within the community.

The Executive Council of the Community met several times a year, in one or other of the capitals, on the summons of the President, who assumed direction of the meeting. It was composed of the chiefs of the governments of the different states and the ministers responsible for common affairs.

The Senate of the Community was composed of members of the local assemblies designated by them in numbers proportional to the population of the state. This body was functionally powerless, and after holding two sessions it was abolished during March 1961.

A Community Court of Arbitration, composed of seven judges nominated by the President, gave decisions in disputes between member states.

Because France did not want to become 'a colony of its colonies', African countries did not compose a majority voting bloc and were required functionally to join with French parties in order to gain voting power.

== Operation ==
The Communauté initially assumed close cooperation between member states and the French government. The French government was responsible for security and to some degree policing in all states. A number of African presidents were present—symbolizing, for continental anti-colonialists, their complicity—at "Gerboise Bleue", France's first nuclear test, which occurred on 4 February 1960 near Reggane in the Sahara Desert of central Algeria.

== Decline and dissolution ==
Among the states, the Community as assumed originally functioned only during 1959 when six sessions of the executive council were held in various capitals. Immediately after the sixth session, held in Dakar during December, President de Gaulle agreed to Mali's claim for national sovereignty, thus beginning the process of all of the states being granted independence during 1960. On 4 June 1960, articles 85 and 86 were amended by Constitutional Act No. 60-525, allowing the member states to become fully independent, either still as members of the Community or not. This amendment also allowed for a state that was already fully independent to join the Community without losing its independence. By 1961, only the Central African Republic, Chad, Congo, Gabon, the Malagasy Republic and Senegal still belonged to the Community. The constitutional bodies no longer continued to function and the term 'president of the community' disappeared from official statements. It seemed that the only remaining differences between those states that were members of the community, and those that had left it, was that the diplomatic representatives in Paris of the former had the title high commissioner, and those of the latter 'ambassador'. Moreover, the second title tended to be used in all cases without distinction.

Although the French Community had almost ceased to exist as an institution by the early 1960s, the remaining members never formally withdrew and the relevant articles were not eliminated from the French Constitution until they were finally abrogated by Constitutional Act number 95-880 of 4 August 1995.

== Chronology ==
=== 1958 ===
- 28 September – A referendum on the proposed constitution for the Fifth Republic is held throughout the French Union. It is approved in every territory except French Guinea, which instead opts, by an overwhelming majority, for complete independence. The campaign in favour of independence had been promoted by Sékou Touré and his Democratic Party of Guinea/African Democratic Rally.
- 2 October – French Guinea gains independence, and is renamed the Republic of Guinea.
- 4 October – The constitution of the Fifth Republic becomes effective.
- 14 October – Madagascar becomes an autonomous state within the Community as the Malagasy Republic.
- 24 November – The French Sudan becomes an autonomous state within the Community as the Sudanese Republic.
- 25 November – Senegal becomes an autonomous state within the Community.
- 28 November – Chad, Gabon, the Middle Congo (as the Republic of the Congo) and Mauritania (as the Islamic Republic of Mauritania) become autonomous states within the Community.
- 1 December – Ubangi-Shari becomes an autonomous state within the Community as the Central African Republic.
- 4 December – Dahomey (as the Republic of Dahomey) and Ivory Coast become autonomous states within the Community.
- 11 December – Upper Volta becomes an autonomous state within the Community.
- 19 December – Niger becomes an autonomous state within the Community.

=== 1959 ===
- 4 April – Senegal and the Sudanese Republic form a union as the Mali Federation. Dakar is the federal capital.

=== 1960 (The Year of Africa) ===
- 1 January – French Cameroon gains complete independence as the Republic of Cameroon.
- 27 April – French Togoland gains complete independence as the Togolese Republic.
- 4 June – Articles 85 and 86 are amended by Constitutional Act No. 60-525, allowing the member states to become fully independent, either still as a member of the Community or not. This amendment also allows for a state that is already fully independent to join the Community without losing its independence; a provision that will never be chosen by any state.
- 20 June – The Mali Federation gains independence, within the Community.
- 26 June – The Malagasy Republic gains independence, within the Community.
- 1 August – The Republic of Dahomey gains complete independence.
- 3 August – Niger gains complete independence.
- 5 August – Upper Volta gains complete independence.
- 7 August – The Ivory Coast gains complete independence.
- 11 August – Chad gains independence, within the Community.
- 13 August – The Central African Republic gains independence, within the Community.
- 15 August – The Republic of the Congo gains independence, within the Community.
- 17 August – Gabon gains independence, within the Community.
- 20 August – Senegal secedes from the Mali Federation and becomes an independent state in its own right, but still within the Community.
- 22 September – The Sudanese Republic is renamed the Republic of Mali, and withdraws from the Community.
- 28 November – Mauritania gains complete independence.

French Community, 1961

=== 1961 ===
- 29 July – The Wallis and Futuna Islands, hitherto administered by the government of New Caledonia, become an overseas territory in their own right.
- 22 December – The Comoro Islands are granted full internal autonomy.

=== 1962 and beyond ===
- 3 July 1962 – Algeria gains complete independence from France, outside the Community.
- 3 July 1967 – Act No. 67-521 grants French Somaliland wider autonomy and changes the name of the territory to the French Territory of the Afars and Issas.
- 6 July 1975 – Comorian President Ahmed Abdallah declares the whole archipelago independent of France, outside the Community. However, with the people of the island of Mayotte having voted in a referendum during 1974 against independence, the French refuse to recognise the inclusion of Mayotte in the new state.
- 19 July 1976 – St Pierre and Miquelon becomes an overseas department of France.
- 24 December 1976 – Mayotte becomes a territorial collectivity of France.
- 27 June 1977 – The French Territory of the Afars and Issas gains complete independence, outside the Community, and is renamed the Republic of Djibouti.
- 11 June 1985 – St Pierre and Miquelon becomes a territorial collectivity with special status, the local authorities having responsibility for taxation, customs arrangements, town planning and shipping registration.
- 4 August 1995 – Constitutional Act number 95-880 repeals the provisions of the French Constitution relating to the Community and the association is formally abolished.

== See also ==
- Colonialism
- Decolonization
- Francophonie
- Françafrique

== Bibliography ==
- De Lusignan, Guy, French-Speaking Africa Since Independence, New York: Praeger, 1969.
- "French Community." Encyclopædia Britannica, Volume 9, Page 756B and 756C. William Benton. London, Chicago, Geneva, Sydney, Toronto. 1963.
- Encyclopædia Britannica World Atlas. William Benton. Chicago, London, Toronto, Geneva, Sydney. 1963 Plates 57–58.
