= 2026 in Saint Lucia =

- Decades: 2000s; 2010s; 2020s
- See also: Other events of 2026; Timeline of Saint Lucian history

Events from the year 2026 in Saint Lucia

== Incumbents ==
- Monarch: Charles III
- Governor-General: Errol Charles (until 31 July); Felix Finisterre (acting, since 1 August)
- Prime Minister: Philip J. Pierre

== Events ==
- May 20 – Joy St. Omer is shot and killed by her former husband in Marigot, Castries, sparking debate in the country which included calls for the resumption of capital punishment.
- July 31 – Errol Charles steps down as governor-general and is replaced on an acting basis by Felix Finisterre effective the next day.

== Holidays ==
- 1 January – New Year's Day
- 22 February – Independence Day
- 3 April – Good Friday
- 6 April – Easter Monday
- 1 May – May Day
- 25 May – Whit Monday
- 4 June – Corpus Christi
- 1 August – Emancipation Day
- 5 October – Thanksgiving
- 13 December – National day
- 25 December – Christmas Day
- 26 December – Boxing Day

== Deaths ==
- 2 June – Sir Neville Cenac, 86, governor-general (2018–2021) and minister of foreign affairs (1987–1992)
- 27 September – Robert Rivas, 80, Trinidadian-born Roman Catholic prelate, archbishop of Castries (2008–2022)

== See also ==
- 2020s
- 2026 Atlantic hurricane season
