= 2022 in Saint Lucia =

- Decades: 2000s; 2010s; 2020s
- See also: Other events of 2022; Timeline of Saint Lucian history

Events from the year 2022 in Saint Lucia.

== Incumbents ==
- Monarch: Elizabeth II (until September 8); then Charles III
- Governor-General: Errol Charles
- Prime Minister: Philip J. Pierre

== Events ==
Ongoing — COVID-19 pandemic in Saint Lucia

- 1 July – Saint Lucia reports its first case of monkeypox.
- 8 September – Accession of Charles III as King of Saint Lucia following the death of Queen Elizabeth II.
- 19 September – Saint Lucians across the country are invited to pause for a 70-second national tribute to reflect on the life and legacy of Elizabeth II, Queen of Saint Lucia. Church bells and sirens from fire stations throughout the nation sounded for one minute and 10 seconds starting at 09:59 to herald the commencement of the 70-second reflection period at 10:00.
- 19 September – Acting Governor-General Errol Charles, Deputy Prime Minister Ernest Hilaire and High Commissioner Anthony Severin attend the state funeral of Queen Elizabeth II in the United Kingdom.

== Deaths ==
- 10 April – Desmond Brathwaite, politician, MP (1987–1997).
- 8 September – Elizabeth II, Queen of Saint Lucia since 1979 (b. 1926).
