= Timeline of the Cold War =

Cold War
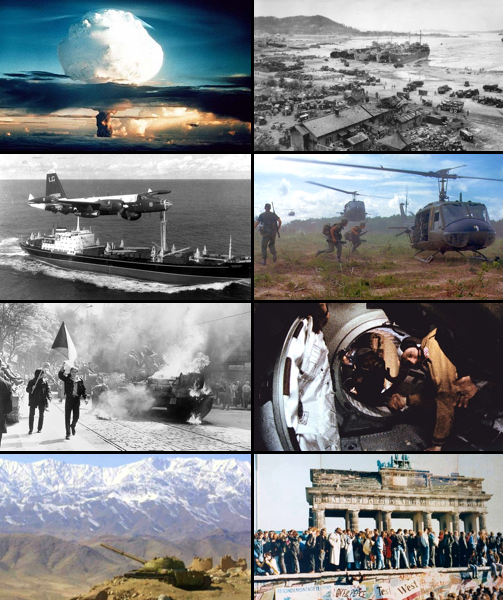
- Clockwise from top left: The detonation of the worlds first thermonuclear weapon, Ivy Mike, on 1 November 1952; United Nations Command forces on Red Beach one day after landing in Incheon during the Korean War; a Bell UH-1 Iroquois helicopter airlifting members of the 14th Infantry Regiment from the Fihol Rubber Plantation in 1966 during Operation Wahiawa during the Vietnam War; Apollo Commander, Astronaut Thomas P. Stafford (in foreground) and Soyuz Commander, Cosmonaut Alexei A. Leonov shake shake hands in the joint American-Soviet Apollo-Soyuz Test Project mission; East Berliners and West Berliners on the Berlin Wall during the Fall of the Berlin Wall; a T-62 Soviet tank in firing position somewhere in the Afghan Mountains during the Soviet–Afghan War; Czechoslovaks carry their national flag past a burning Soviet tank during the Warsaw Pact invasion of Czechoslovakia in 1968; United States Navy Lockheed SP-2H Neptune of patrol squadron VP-18 Flying Phantoms flying over the Soviet freighter Okhotsk during the Cuban Missile Crisis in 1962.
Date	12 March 1947 – 26 December 1991 (Note: While the start and end of the Cold War are debated, its usually accepted that it started with the implementation of the Truman Doctrine on 12 March 1947 and ended with the de jure dissolution of the Soviet Union on 26 December 1991.) (44 years, 9 months and 14 days)
Location	Global
Result	Western Bloc victory

Belligerents
Western Bloc: North Atlantic Treaty Organization; Belgium; Canada (Note: When Canada founded NATO, it had this flag; however, its de jure flag was the Union Jack.); Denmark; France; West Germany (1955-1990) (Note: See German reunification); Germany (from 1990); Greece (from 1952) (Note: The Greek government changed during the Cold War (see: Greek Junta, Third Hellenic Republic).); Iceland; Italy; Luxembourg; Netherlands; Norway; Portugal (Note: The Portuguese government changed during the Cold War during the Estado Novo Period (see: National Salvation Junta, Third Portuguese Republic).); Spain (from 1982); Turkey (from 1952); United Kingdom; United States (Note: When the United States founded NATO, it had this flag.); Afghanistan (until 1973); Australia; Bangladesh (from 1975); Brazil; China (until 1949) (Note: See Retreat of the government of the Republic of China to Taiwan); Congo (1960-1965); Cuba (until 1959); Egypt (until 1953); Egyptian AR (from 1974); Ethiopia (until 1974) (Note: See Ethiopian Revolution); Iran (until 1979) (Note: See Iranian Revolution); Iraq (until 1958) (Note: See 14 July Revolution); Israel (from 1948); Japan (from 1952); Khmer Republic (1970–1975); Laos (1962–1975); Liberia; Malaya (1957-1963) (Note: The years of allegiance for Malaya start at 1957 because that's when Malaya gained independence from the United Kingdom.); Malaysia (from 1963); Mexico; New Zealand (from 1947) (Note: The British Dominions are not listed on this list. See Dominion of New Zealand.); Pakistan (1956-1979) (Note: The British Dominions are not listed on this list. See Dominion of Pakistan.); Philippines (Note: During the Cold War, the Philippines changed governments multiple times. (see: Republic of the Philippines (under martial law), Fourth Philippine Republic, Provisional Government of the Philippines, and the modern day Philippines) However, for the sake of simplicity, the Philippines is only listed once in the format when it first joined the Western Camp.); Rhodesia (1965-1979); Saudi Arabia (Thailand) Siam (Note: Thailand had many governments throught the Cold War (see: Thailand and the modern day Thailand. However for the sake of simplicity, it is listed once in the format when it first joined the Western Bloc. And that includes the name Siam, as it changed its name to Thailand in 1949, two years after the Cold war started.); Singapore (from 1965); South Africa (until 1961) (Note: The Union of South Africa is listed on here despite there being no Dominions or other colonies listed on these lists because it ratified the Statute of Westminster before the start of the Cold War. This effectively gave it full independence from the United Kingdom.); Republic of South Africa (from 1961); South Korea (from 1948) (Note: South Korea went through many governments during the Cold War. (see: Second Republic of Korea, Supreme Council for National Reconstruction, Third Republic of Korea, Fourth Republic of Korea, and the modern day Republic of Korea) However, for the sake of simplicity, South Korea is only listed once in the format when it first joined the Western Bloc.); Taiwan (from 1949); Tibet (until 1951); State of Vietnam (1949–1955); South Vietnam (1955–1975); Yemen (until 1970); Zaire (from 1965) and others...	Eastern Bloc: Warsaw Pact; Albania (until 1968) (Note: Albania was de facto expelled from the Warsaw Pact in 1961 after rising tensions with the Soviet Union. They officially withdrew in 1968.); Bulgaria; Czechoslovakia; East Germany (Note: This was the flag of East Germany when the Warsaw Pact was founded. See also:German reunification) (until 1990); Hungary (Note: This was the flag of Hungary when the Warsaw Pact was founded. It also withdrew from the Warsaw Pact on November 1, 1956 during the Hungarian Revolution. However, the Soviet Union invaded Hungary on November 4, 1956, thus restoring its membership in the Warsaw Pact.); Poland; Romania; Soviet Union; Afghanistan (from 1978); Angola (from 1975); Bangladesh (1971-1975); Benin (1975–1990); Chile (1970-1973): China (Eastern Bloc: 1949-1961) (Note: See Sino-Soviet Split) Chinese Bloc: Albania (1968-1978); Democratic Kampuchea (1975–1982) (Note: See Cambodian–Vietnamese War); Somalia (1977-1991); Cuba (from 1959); Egypt (1953-1958); Egyptian AR (1971-1974); Ethiopia (1974-1987); PDR Ethiopia (1987-1991); India (from 1971); Indonesia (1959-1969); Iraq (1958-1968); Ba'athist Iraq (from 1968); Kampuchea (from 1979); Laos (from 1975); Libyan AR (1969-1977); Libya (from 1977); Madagascar (from 1975); Mongolia; Mozambique (from 1975); Nicaragua (1979-1990); North Korea (from 1948); Seychelles (1977-1991); Somalia (1969-1977); South Yemen (1967-1990); Syria (1957-1958); Ba'athist Syria (from 1963); United Arab Republic (1958–1971): North Vietnam (1950–1976); South Vietnam (1975–1976) (Note: Military-occupied client state of North Vietnam); Vietnam (from 1976); Yugoslavia (until 1948) (Note: See Tito–Stalin split) and others...

This is a timeline of the main events of the Cold War, a state of political and military tension after World War II between powers in the Western Bloc (the United States, its NATO allies, South Vietnam, South Korea, and others) and powers in the Eastern Bloc (the Soviet Union, its allies in the Warsaw Pact, China, Cuba, North Vietnam and North Korea).

== 1940s ==
=== 1945 ===
- February 4–11: The Yalta Conference in Crimea, RSFSR, with US President Franklin D. Roosevelt, British Prime Minister Winston Churchill and Soviet leader Joseph Stalin, and their top aides. Main attention is deciding the post-war status of Germany. The Allies of World War II (the United States, the Soviet Union, United Kingdom and also France) divide Germany into four occupation zones. The Allied nations agree that free elections are to be held in Poland and all countries occupied by Nazi Germany. In addition, the new United Nations are to replace the failed League of Nations.
- March 6: The Soviet Union installs a puppet government in Romania.
- March 7: Josip Broz Tito is installed as the head of the provisional government of Democratic Federal Yugoslavia.
- March–April: U.S. and Britain outraged as Stalin excludes them from a role in Poland and turns Poland over to a Communist puppet government he controls.
- March–April: Stalin is outraged at inaccurate reports about Operation Sunrise that American Office of Strategic Services in Switzerland is negotiating a surrender of German forces; he demands a Soviet general be present at all negotiations. Roosevelt vehemently denies the allegation but closes down the operation in Switzerland. A Soviet general is present at the negotiations in northern Italy that lead to surrender.
- April 12: Roosevelt dies; Vice President Harry S. Truman takes over with little knowledge of current diplomatic efforts, no knowledge of the atomic bomb, and a bias against Russia.
- April 28: Benito Mussolini dies.
- April 30: Adolf Hitler dies.
- April 30: Start of occupation of Trieste by Yugoslav forces, although challenged by the 2nd New Zealand Division under General Freyberg and the city remained part of Italy. Cox said that it was the first major confrontation of the Cold War and was the one corner of Europe where no demarcation line had been agreed upon in advance by the Allies.
- May 2: The Italian Civil War ends.
- May 8: Germany surrenders. End of World War II in Europe (V-E Day).
- July 24: Potsdam Conference - At the Potsdam Conference, Truman informs Stalin that the United States has nuclear weapons.
- August 6: Atomic bombings of Hiroshima and Nagasaki - Truman follows the advice of Secretary of War Henry L. Stimson and gives permission for the world's first military use of an atomic weapon, against the Japanese city of Hiroshima.
- August 8: The USSR honors its agreement to declare war on Japan within three months of the victory in Europe, and invades Manchuria.
- August 9: With no Japanese response to his ultimatums, Truman gives permission for the world's second and last military use of an atomic weapon, against the Japanese city of Nagasaki (Kokura was the original target).
- August 12: Japanese forces in Korea surrender to Soviet and American armies.
- August 17: Proclamation of Indonesian Independence - The Dutch East Indies declares its independence from the Dutch. This marked the beginning of the Indonesian National Revolution.
- August 19–September 1: The Viet Minh seizes control of Hanoi and much of the former Empire of Vietnam after the surrender of Japan, proclaiming the Democratic Republic of Vietnam and initiating civil conflicts.
- September 2: Surrender of Japan - The Empire of Japan surrenders unconditionally to the United States, officially ending World War II. General Douglas MacArthur presides over the occupation of Japan, and freezes out Russian and other allied representatives(V-J day).
- September 5: Igor Gouzenko, a Soviet agent working in the Soviet embassy in Canada, defects and provides proof to the Royal Canadian Mounted Police of a Soviet spy ring operating in Canada and the U.S. The revelations help change perceptions of the Soviet Union from an ally to a foe.
- October 25: Taiwan is transferred to the Republic of China from Japan. Initially the Chinese public was supportive of the transfer but later becomes less so as the newly appointed governor, General Chen Yi gains a reputation for being corrupt and mismanaging the island. Economic problems also occur as the governor extends the scope of the government monopoly over Taiwan's resources in order to sell these goods to the mainland to help fight the Communist forces. The conditions on the island later contribute to the February 28 incident.
- November: Iran crisis of 1946 - Stalin refuses to relinquish Soviet-occupied territory in Iran, beginning the Iran Crisis. Two short-lived pro-Soviet states, the Azerbaijan People's Government and the Republic of Mahabad, are formed.
- November 20: The Nuremberg trials begin.

=== 1946 ===
- January: The Chinese Civil War resumed between Communist and Nationalist forces.
- January 7: The Republic of Austria is reconstituted, with its 1937 borders, but divided into four zones of control: American, British, French, and Soviet.
- January 11: Enver Hoxha declares the People's Republic of Albania, with himself as Prime Minister.
- February 9: Joseph Stalin makes his Election Speech, in which he states that capitalism and imperialism make future wars inevitable.
- February 22: George F. Kennan writes his Long Telegram, describing his interpretation of the objectives and intentions of the Soviet leadership.
- March: The Greek Civil War reignites between the communists and the Kingdom of Greece.
- March 2: British soldiers withdraw from their zone of occupation in southern Iran. Soviet soldiers remain in their northern sector.
- March 5: Winston Churchill warns of the descent of an Iron Curtain across Europe. Named by Winston Churchill, the aim of the Iron Curtain was to create a divide between the developing countries in Europe and the ones still under political influence and dictatorship (Soviet Union).
- March 6: The Ho–Sainteny Agreement recognizes the Democratic Republic of Vietnam as a "free state" within the French Union. The French replace Chinese Nationalist forces in North Vietnam. Vietnamese non-nationalist parties are to be eliminated by the Viet Minh with French assistance.
- May 25: The Treaty of London comes into effect, granting the Amirate of Trans-Jordan independence from the United Kingdom as the Hashemite Kingdom of Transjordan.
- May 26: The Communist Party of Czechoslovakia, alongside the Communist Party of Slovakia, receive 38 percent of the vote in the 1946 parliamentary election, becoming the largest party in the Constituent National Assembly.
- June 2: Following a referendum, the Italian Monarchy is abolished and the Italian Republic is born.
- July 4: The Philippines gains independence from the United States, and begins fighting communist Huk rebels (Hukbalahap Rebellion). The Telangana Rebellion occurred in India.
- September 6: In a speech known as the Restatement of Policy on Germany in Stuttgart, James F. Byrnes, United States Secretary of State repudiates the Morgenthau Plan. He states the US intention to keep troops in Europe indefinitely and expresses US approval of the territorial annexation of 29% of pre-war Germany, but does not condone further claims.
- September 8: In a referendum, Bulgaria votes for the establishment of a People's Republic, deposing King Simeon II. Western countries dismiss the vote as fundamentally flawed.
- September 24: Harry S. Truman is presented with the Clifford-Elsey Report, a document which lists Soviet violations of agreements with the United States.
- September 27: Nikolai Vasilevich Novikov writes a response to Kennan's Long Telegram, known as the 'Novikov Telegram', in which he states that the United States were "striving for world supremacy".
- October 1: The Nuremberg trials conclude.
- October 16: After the Nuremberg trials, 11 Nazi leaders are sentenced to death and executed by hanging. Hermann Göring commits suicide before his execution is carried out.
- December 15: The Soviet Union withdraws from Iran. Both the Azerbaijan People's Government and the Republic of Mahabad are dissolved.
- December 19: The First Indochina War begins between the communist-controlled Viet Minh and the French.

=== 1947 ===
- January 1: The American and British zones of control in Germany are united to form the Bizone, also known as Bizonia.
- February 10: Establishment of the neutral state Free Territory of Trieste.
- February 25: Prussia was de jure abolished.
- February 27: The February 28 incident begins in Taiwan lasting until mid-March.
- March 7: Paraguayan Civil War begins.
- March 12: President Harry Truman announces the Truman Doctrine starting with the giving of aid to Greece and Turkey in order to prevent them from falling into the Soviet sphere.
- April 16: Bernard Baruch, in a speech given during the unveiling of his portrait in the South Carolina House of Representatives, coins the term "Cold War" to describe relations between the United States and the Soviet Union.
- May 22: US extends $400 million of military aid to Greece and Turkey, signalling its intent to contain communism in the Mediterranean.
- June 5: Secretary of State George Marshall outlines plans for a comprehensive program of economic assistance for the war-ravaged countries of Western Europe. It would become known throughout the world as the Marshall Plan.
- July 11: The US announces new occupation policies in Germany. The occupation directive JCS 1067, whose economic section had prohibited "steps looking toward the economic rehabilitation of Germany [or] designed to maintain or strengthen the German economy", is replaced by the new US occupation directive JCS 1779 which instead notes that "An orderly, prosperous Europe requires the economic contributions of a stable and productive Germany."
- August 14: Partition of India: Pakistan gains independence from the United Kingdom.
- August 15: Partition of India: India gains independence from the United Kingdom.
- September 9–10: Hong Kong conference: Nationalist groups rally around ex-emperor Bảo Đại, seeking an alternative solution for a non-communist Vietnam.
- September: The Soviet Union forms the Communist Information Bureau (COMINFORM) with which it dictates the actions of leaders and communist parties across its spheres of influence.
- October 20: Stanisław Mikołajczyk, leader of the non-communist Polish People's Party, flees the country ahead of impending arrest. Organized, legal political opposition to Polish communism is effectively at an end.
- November 14: The United Nations passes a resolution calling for the withdrawal of foreign soldiers from Korea, free elections in each of the two administrations, and the creation of a UN commission dedicated to the unification of the peninsula.
- November 29: The United Nations agrees to partition Palestine.
- November 30: The first phase of the 1948 Palestine war begins.
- December 30: In Romania, King Michael I of Romania is forced to abdicate by Gheorghe Gheorghiu-Dej, the monarchy is abolished and the Socialist Republic of Romania is instituted instead. The Communist Party would rule the country until December 1989.

=== 1948 ===
- January 5: Burma (today Myanmar) becomes independent from the UK through the Burma Independence Act 1947.
- January 30: Mahatma Gandhi was assassinated.
- February 25: The Communist Party takes control of Czechoslovakia in the Czechoslovak coup d'état of 1948.
- March 5: The Berlin Crisis intensifies, according to General Lucius D. Clay
- March 10: Czechoslovak Foreign Minister Jan Masaryk is reported having committed suicide.
- March 12: The Costa Rican Civil War begins.
- March 17: The Treaty of Brussels, an agreement is signed by Britain, France, Belgium, the Netherlands, and Luxembourg, creating a collective defense alliance. (It was the precursor to NATO)
- April 3: Truman signs the Marshall Plan into effect. By the end of the programs, the United States has given $12.4 billion in economic assistance to Western European countries.
- April 9: La Violencia begins in Colombia between the Colombian Conservative Party and the Colombian Liberal Party.
- May 10: A parliamentary vote in southern Korea sees the confirmation of Syngman Rhee as President of the Republic of Korea, after a left-wing boycott.
- May 14: David Ben-Gurion declares Israeli independence from the United Kingdom. (Note: While Israel declared independence on May 14, 1948, it was not officially independent until the next day when the Mandate for Palestine and Mandatory Palestine-Mandatory Palestine was governed by the British under the terms of the Mandate for Palestine-were dissolved.)
- May 15: The British Mandate for Palestine is terminated, and any and all British authority in Palestine ends. As a result, the armies of the Kingdom of Egypt, Transjordan, the Kingdom of Iraq, Syria, Lebanon, Saudi Arabia, and the Kingdom of Yemen entered the former mandate to create an Arab state in Palestine in the place of the State of Israel. This is seen as the beginning of the second phase of the 1948 Palestine war.
- June 12: Mátyás Rákosi becomes General Secretary of the Hungarian Working People's Party and, therefore, the de facto leader of the Second Hungarian Republic.
- June 18: A communist insurgency in Malaya begins against British and Commonwealth forces.
- June 21: In Germany, the British zone and the French zone launch a common currency, the Deutsche Mark.
- June 24: Stalin orders the Berlin Blockade, closing all land routes from West Germany to Berlin, in an attempt to starve out the French, British, and American forces from the city. In response, the three Western powers launch the Berlin Airlift to supply the citizens of Berlin by air.
- June 28: The Soviet Union expels Yugoslavia from the Communist Information Bureau (COMINFORM) for the latter's position on the Greek Civil War.
- June 28: Stalin attempts to starve West Berlin with a blockade. The Berlin Airlift begins.
- August 1: French zone of occupation created in Germany and Berlin.
- August 15: The United States declares the Republic of Korea to be the legitimate government of the Korean Peninsula, with Syngman Rhee installed as the leader.
- September 9: The Soviet Union declares the Democratic People's Republic of Korea to be the legitimate government of all of the Korean Peninsula, with Kim Il Sung installed as the leader.
- September 11: Muhammad Ali Jinnah dies.
- September 13: India annexes Hyderabad under the code name, Operation Polo.
- September 18: In Indonesia, the Madiun Affair, an uprising carried out by the People's Democratic Front (FDR), begins led by Musso, of the Communist Party of Indonesia. The uprising ends after three months when the Indonesian army captures and kills most of the rebels.
- November 20: The American consul and his staff in Mukden, China, are made virtual hostages by communist forces in China. The crisis does not end until a year later, by which time U.S. relations with the new communist government in China had been seriously damaged.

=== 1949 ===
- January 5–8: The Council for Economic Mutual Assistance (Comecon) formed.
- March 8: The Élysée Accords recognize Vietnam as an associated state within the French Union.
- April 4: The North Atlantic Treaty Organization (NATO) is founded by Belgium, Canada, Denmark, France, Iceland, Italy, Luxembourg, the Netherlands, Norway, Portugal, the United Kingdom, and the United States, in order to resist Communist expansion.
- May 11: The Soviet blockade of Berlin ends with the re-opening of access routes to Berlin. The airlift continues until September, in case the Soviets re-establish the blockade. Brune argues, "Moscow realized the blockade had not been successful – it had drawn the Western powers closer together rather than dividing them. Finally, Western countermeasures had inflicted considerable damage on the economic life of East Germany and the other Soviet satellites."
- May 23: In Germany, the Bizone merges with the French zone of control to form the Federal Republic of Germany, with Bonn as its capital.
- June 14: The State of Vietnam is proclaimed.
- July 20: The 1948 Arab–Israeli War ends with an Israeli victory. As a result of the war, the Transjordanians annex the West Bank and Egypt occupies the Gaza Strip, turning it into the All-Palestine Protectorate.
- August 29: The Soviet Union tests its first atomic bomb. The test, known to Americans as Joe 1, succeeds, as the Soviet Union becomes the world's second nuclear power.
- September 13: The USSR vetoes the United Nations membership of Ceylon, Finland, Iceland, Italy, Jordan, and Portugal.
- September 15: Konrad Adenauer becomes the first Chancellor of the Federal Republic of Germany.
- October 1: Mao Zedong declares the foundation of the People's Republic of China, adding a quarter of the world's population to the communist camp.
- October 7: The Soviets declare their zone of Germany to be the German Democratic Republic, with its capital at East Berlin.
- October 16: Nikos Zachariadis, leader of the Communist Party of Greece, declares an end to the armed uprising. The declaration brings to a close the Greek Civil War, and the first successful containment of communism.
- December 27: Sovereignty of Indonesia is handed over to United States of Indonesia from the Netherlands following the Dutch-Indonesian Round Table Conference with Sukarno as the first president of the newly formed federation.

== 1950s ==
=== 1950 ===
- January 5: The UK recognizes the People's Republic of China. The Republic of China severs diplomatic relations with the United Kingdom.
- January 13: Because of the failure to replace Taiwan with the People's Republic of China in the United Nations Security Council the Soviet Union boycotts the United Nations by having their diplomat Yakov Malik not attend any United Nations Security Council meetings.
- January 18: China officially recognizes the Democratic Republic of Vietnam.
- January 21: The last Kuomintang soldiers surrender on continental China.
- January 31: President Truman announces the beginning of the development of a hydrogen bomb.
- February 3: Soviet Union establishes diplomatic relations with Indonesia through an exchange of telegrams between Indonesian Vice-president, Mohammad Hatta and Soviet Foreign Minister Andrey Vyshinsky.
- February 7: The UK and the US recognize the State of Vietnam.
- February 9: Senator Joseph McCarthy first claims without evidence that Communists have infiltrated the U.S. State Department, leading to a controversial series of anti-Communist investigations in the United States.
- February 12: The Soviet Union and the People's Republic of China sign a pact of mutual defense.
- March 11: Kuomintang leader Chiang Kai-shek moves his capital to Taipei, Taiwan, establishing a stand-off with the People's Republic of China.
- April 7: United States State Department Director of Policy Planning Paul Nitze issues NSC 68, a classified report, arguing for the adoption of containment as the cornerstone of United States foreign policy. It would dictate US policy for the next twenty years.
- May 5–6: Peasants rebelled against the government in Cazin and in Velika Kladuša, Bosnia. The uprising was eventually suppressed by government forces.
- May 11: Robert Schuman describes his ambition of a united Europe. Known as the Schuman Declaration, it marks the beginning of the creation of the European Community.
- June 25: North Korea invades South Korea, beginning the Korean War. The United Nations Security Council votes to intervene to defend the South. The Soviet Union cannot veto, as it is boycotting the Security Council over the admission of People's Republic of China.
- June 28: North Korean forces capture Seoul.
- June 29: The first bombing attack on North Korea was approved by General Douglas MacArthur
- July 5: United Nations forces engage North Korean forces for the first time, in Osan. They fail to halt the North Korean advance, and fall southwards, towards what would become the Pusan Perimeter.
- September 30: United Nations forces land at Inchon. Defeating the North Korean forces, they press inland and re-capture Seoul.
- October 2: United Nations forces cross the 38th parallel, into North Korea.
- October 6: Forces from the People's Republic of China enter Tibet, with the goal of annexing the region into China itself.
- October 11: Stalin agrees to send MiG-15 fighters to provide air cover for Chinese forces moving into North Korea.
- October 22: Pyongyang, the capital of North Korea, falls to United Nations forces.
- October 22: China intervenes in Korea with 300,000 soldiers, catching the United Nations by surprise. However, they withdraw after initial engagements.
- November 15: United Nations forces approach the Yalu River. In response, China intervenes in Korea again, but with a 500,000 strong army. This offensive forces the United Nations back towards South Korea.

=== 1951 ===
- January 4: Chinese soldiers capture Seoul.
- March 14: United Nations forces recapture Seoul during Operation Ripper. By the end of March, they have reached the 38th Parallel, and formed a defensive line across the Korean Peninsula.
- March 29: Julius and Ethel Rosenberg are convicted of espionage for their role in passing atomic secrets to the Soviets during and after World War II; they were executed on June 19, 1953.
- April 11: U.S. President Harry S. Truman fires Douglas MacArthur from command of US forces in Korea due to him demanding nuclear weapons to be used on the enemy.
- April 18: The European Coal and Steel Community is formed by the Treaty of Paris.
- April 23: American journalist William N. Oatis is arrested in Czechoslovakia for alleged espionage.
- May 23: The Seventeen Point Agreement is signed between Tibet and the People's Republic of China, formally annexing Tibet into China itself.
- September 1: Australia, New Zealand, and the United States sign the ANZUS Treaty. This compels the three countries to cooperate on matters of defense and security in the Pacific.
- October 10: President Harry S. Truman signs the Mutual Security Act, announcing to the world, and its communist powers in particular, that the U.S. was prepared to provide military aid to "free peoples".
- November 14: President Harry Truman asks Congress for U.S. military and economic aid for the communist nation of Yugoslavia.
- December 12: The International Authority for the Ruhr lifts part of the remaining restrictions on German industrial production and on production capacity.
- December 24: The British Military Administration of Libya, the Military Territory of Fezzan-Ghadames, and the Emirate of Cyrenaica merge to form the United Kingdom of Libya.

=== 1952 ===
- February 6: George VI dies and Princess Elizabeth becomes Queen of the United Kingdom and of the British Dominions beyond The Seas.
- February 18: Greece and Turkey join NATO.
- April 28: The Treaty of San Francisco, signed by Japan on September 8, 1951, comes into effect, and Japan signs the Treaty of Taipei, formally ending its period of occupation and isolation, and becoming a sovereign state.
- June: Strategic Air Command begins deployments of Convair B-36 and B-47 Stratojet long-range nuclear bombers to overseas bases like purpose-built Nouasseur Air Base in French Morocco, placing them within unrefueled striking range of Moscow.
- June 14: The United States lays the keel for the world's first nuclear-powered submarine, USS Nautilus.
- June 30: The Marshall Plan ends, with European industrial output now well above that of 1948.
- July 23: Mohamed Naguib and Gamal Abdel Nasser successfully instigate a revolution in Egypt.
- October 2: The United Kingdom successfully tests its first atomic bomb in Operation Hurricane. The test makes the UK the world's third nuclear power.
- November 1: The United States tests their first thermonuclear fusion bomb, Ivy Mike.
- November 4: Dwight Eisenhower defeats Adlai Stevenson in the 1952 presidential election

=== 1953 ===
- January 20: Dwight D. Eisenhower becomes President, with John Foster Dulles as Secretary of State.
- February 3: The Batepá massacre occurred in São Tomé and Príncipe.
- February 28: Balkan Pact is signed by Yugoslavia, Greece and Turkey. The pact's main objective is to deter Soviet expansionism.
- March 5: Stalin dies, setting off a power struggle to succeed him. NATO debates possibility of a fresh start.
- May 31–June 2: The 1953 Plzeň uprising was violently suppressed by the Czechoslovak government.
- June 2: Elizabeth II is crowned Queen of the United Kingdom and the other Commonwealth realms, at Westminster Abbey.
- June 17: Uprising of 1953 in East Germany crushed by Soviet troops.
- July 26: The Cuban Revolution begins as the 26th of July Movement led by Fidel Castro attempts to overthrow the government of Fulgencio Batista.
- July 27: An armistice agreement ends fighting in the Korean War, after Eisenhower threatens the use of nuclear weapons.
- August 19: The Central Intelligence Agency (CIA) and the British MI6 assists a royalist coup that restores Mohammad Reza Pahlavi to power as the Shah of Iran and ousts Prime Minister Mohammed Mosaddeq (Operation Ajax). The coup was organized because of Iranian nationalization of the oil industry and fears of Iran joining the Soviet camp.
- September 7: Nikita Khrushchev becomes leader of the Communist Party of the Soviet Union. His main rival, Lavrentiy Beria, is executed in December.
- September 23: The Pact of Madrid is signed by Spain and the United States.
- December 4–8: Eisenhower meets with Churchill and Joseph Laniel of France in Bermuda.

=== 1954 ===
- January 21: The U.S. launches the world's first nuclear submarine, the USS Nautilus. The nuclear submarine would become the ultimate nuclear deterrent.
- March 8: U.S. and Japan Mutual Defense Assistance Agreement is signed by the United States and Japan.
- March 13: The KGB is created as the successor agency of the NKVD.
- April–June: The Army–McCarthy hearings are broadcast on American television, leading to a loss of support for McCarthyism.
- May 7: The Viet Minh defeat the French at Dien Bien Phu.
- May 17: The Hukbalahap revolt in the Philippines is defeated.
- June 2: Senator Joseph McCarthy claims that communists have infiltrated the CIA and the atomic weapons industry.
- June 18: The elected leftist Guatemalan government is overthrown in a CIA-backed coup. An unstable rightist regime installs itself. Opposition leads to a guerrilla war with Marxist rebels in which major human rights abuses are committed on all sides. Nevertheless, the regime survives until the end of the Cold War.
- July 8: Col. Carlos Castillo Armas is elected president of the junta that overthrew the administration of Guatemalan President Jacobo Arbenz Guzman.
- July 21: The Geneva Conference concludes with accords ending French fighting in Indochina but does not resolve the conflict between the two internationally recognized Vietnamese regimes. The country is partitioned into communist North Vietnam and anticommunist South Vietnam, setting the stage for the Vietnam War.
- July 22: India annexes the Portuguese territories of Dadra and Nagar Haveli.
- August 11: The Taiwan Strait Crisis begins with the Chinese Communist shelling of Taiwanese islands. The US backs Taiwan, and the crisis resolves itself as both sides decline to take action.
- September 8: Foundation of the South East Asian Treaty Organization (SEATO) by Australia, France, New Zealand, Pakistan, Thailand, the Philippines, the United Kingdom, and the United States. Like NATO, it is founded to resist Communist expansion, this time in the Philippines and Indochina.
- October 5: The Free Territory of Trieste is dissolved.
- October 10: The Jebel Akhdar War begins in Oman.
- November 1: The fight for independence in French Algeria begins.
- December 2: Sino-American Mutual Defense Treaty, is signed between the United States and the Republic of China.
- December 15: Surinam becomes a Dutch constituent state.

=== 1955 ===
- February 24: The Baghdad Pact is founded by Iran, Iraq, Pakistan, Turkey, and the United Kingdom. It is committed to resisting Communist expansion in the Middle East.
- March: Soviet aid to Syria begins. The Syrians will remain allies of the Soviets until the end of the Cold War.
- April 18: The Asia-Africa Conference (also known as the Bandung Conference) is first held in Bandung, Indonesia.
- April: The Non-Aligned Movement is pioneered by Jawaharlal Nehru of India, Sukarno of Indonesia, Tito of Yugoslavia, Gamal Abdel Nasser of Egypt and Kwame Nkrumah of Ghana (then known as the Gold Coast). This movement is designed to be a bulwark against the 'dangerous polarization' of the world at that time and to restore the balance of power with smaller nations.
- May 5: The Allies end the military occupation of West Germany.
- May 6: The United States begins formal diplomatic relations with West Germany, followed soon after by the United Kingdom and France.
- May 9: West Germany joins NATO and begins rearmament.
- May 14: The Warsaw Pact is founded in Eastern Europe and includes East Germany, Czechoslovakia, Poland, Hungary, Romania, Albania, Bulgaria, and the Soviet Union. It acts as the Communist military counterpart to NATO.
- May 15: The Austrian State Treaty is signed by the Allied powers.
- July 18: President Dwight D. Eisenhower of the United States, Prime Minister Anthony Eden of the United Kingdom, Premier Nikolai A. Bulganin of the Soviet Union, and Prime Minister Edgar Faure of France, known as the 'Big Four', attend the Geneva Summit. Also in attendance was Nikita Khrushchev of the Soviet Union.
- July 27: Austria becomes an independent country after the end of the Allied occupation. The last allied troops leave the country in October.
- August 15: The First Sudanese Civil War begins between the north and the south.
- November 1: MAAG Vietnam is organized, often regarded as the starting point of the Vietnam War.

=== 1956 ===
- January 1: Anglo-Egyptian Sudan gains independence from the joint rule of the UK and the Republic of Egypt (Note: The Sudan was de jure a condominium of the United Kingdom and Egypt between 1899 and 1956;however, it was de facto a colony administered by the United Kingdom in which Egypt had very little say.) as the Republic of Sudan.
- February 25: Nikita Khrushchev delivers the speech "On the Personality Cult and its Consequences" at the closed session of the Twentieth Party Congress of the CPSU. The speech marks the beginning of the De-Stalinization.
- March 20: Tunisia becomes independent from France.
- June 28: In Poznań, Poland, anti-communist protests lead to violence.
- July: The United States and the United Kingdom cancel offers of aid on the construction of the Aswan Dam in Egypt due to its arms purchases from the Eastern Bloc. Nasser retaliates by nationalizing the Suez Canal.
- October 23: Hungarian Revolution of 1956: Hungarians revolt against the Soviet dominated government. They are crushed by the Soviet military, which reinstates a Communist government.
- October 29: Suez Crisis: France, Israel, and the United Kingdom attack Egypt with the goal of removing Nasser from power. International diplomatic pressures force the attackers to withdraw. Canadian Lester B. Pearson encourages the United Nations to send a Peacekeeping force, the first of its kind, to the disputed territory. Lester B. Pearson wins a Nobel Peace Prize for his actions, and soon after becomes Canadian Prime Minister.
- November 6: Dwight Eisenhower wins re-election, defeating Adlai Stevenson for the second time in the 1956 presidential election
- December: Viet Cong insurgency begins in South Vietnam.

=== 1957 ===
- January 5: The Eisenhower Doctrine commits the United States to defending Iran, Pakistan, and Afghanistan from Communist influence.
- January 22: Israeli forces withdraw from the Sinai, which they had occupied the previous year.
- February 15: Andrei Gromyko begins his long tenure as Foreign Minister of the Soviet Union.
- March 6: The Gold Coast becomes independent from the UK and renamed Ghana, which was under Commonwealth status.
- May 2: Senator Joseph McCarthy succumbs to illness exacerbated by alcoholism and dies.
- May 15: The United Kingdom detonates its first hydrogen bomb.
- August 31: Malaya gains independence from the United Kingdom.
- October 1: The Strategic Air Command initiates 24/7 nuclear alert (continuous until termination in 1991) in anticipation of a Soviet ICBM surprise attack capability.
- October 4: Sputnik 1 satellite launched. The same day the Avro Arrow is revealed.
- November 3: Sputnik 2 was launched, with the first living being on board, Laika.
- November 7: The final report from a special committee called by President Dwight D. Eisenhower to review the nation's defense readiness indicates that the United States is falling far behind the Soviets in missile capabilities, and urges a vigorous campaign to build fallout shelters to protect American citizens.
- November 15: Soviet leader Nikita Khrushchev claims that the Soviet Union has missile superiority over the United States and challenges America to a missile "shooting match" to prove his assertion.
- December 16–19: NATO holds its first summit in Paris, France. It is the first time NATO leaders have met together since the signing of the North Atlantic Treaty in April 1949.

=== 1958 ===
- January: Mao Zedong initiates the Great Leap Forward.
- January 31: The U.S. Army launches Explorer 1, the first American artificial satellite.
- February 1: The United Arab Republic is formed.
- March 14: The United States imposes an arms embargo on Cuba.
- May 18: On a bombing mission in support of the anti-Sukarno Permesta Rebellion, a B-26 bomber supplied by the CIA is shot down in Ambon, Indonesia. The pilot, US citizen Allen Lawrence Pope is captured and imprisoned.
- June: A C-118 transport, hauling freight from Turkey to Iran, is shot down. The nine crew members are released by the Russians little more than a week later.
- July 14: A coup in Iraq, the 14 July Revolution, removes the pro-British monarch. Iraq begins to receive support from the Soviets. Iraq will maintain close ties with the Soviets throughout the Cold War.
- July 15: A political crisis occurred in Lebanon.
- July 29: NASA was founded.
- August: Thor IRBM deployed to the UK, within striking distance of Moscow.
- August 23: Second Taiwan Strait Crisis begins when China begins to bomb Quemoy.
- September 1: Iceland expands its fishing zone. United Kingdom opposed the action and eventually deploy some of its navy to the zone, thus triggering the Cod Wars.
- October 8: Guinea becomes independent from France.
- October 11: Pioneer 1 was launched.
- November 8: Pioneer 2 was launched.
- November 10: Start of the 1958–1959 Berlin crisis, Nikita Khrushchev asks the West to leave Berlin.
- December 6: Pioneer 3 was launched.

=== 1959 ===
- January 1: Fidel Castro wins the Cuban Revolution and becomes the dictator of Cuba. In the next several years Cuban-inspired guerrilla movements spring up across Latin America.
- January 2: Luna 1 is launched in an attempt to impact the Moon but due to an error in device's control systems, resulted in the device missing its target by 5,990 kilometres (3,720 mi).
- March 3: Pioneer 4 was launched in an attempt to photograph the Moon. The probe failed to achieve its intended target of 32,000 kilometres (20,000 mi) from the Moon, reaching only 60,000 kilometres (37,000 mi), too distant for its scanners to photograph the Moon.
- March 10–23: The Tibetan uprising occurs.
- March 24: New Republic government of Iraq leaves Central Treaty Organization.
- May 23: The Laotian Civil War begins.
- July 24: During the opening of the American National Exhibition in Moscow US Vice President Richard Nixon and Soviet First Secretary Khrushchev openly debate the capacities of each Superpower. This conversation is known as the Kitchen Debate.
- July 31: The Basque conflict officially begins, with the aim of creating an independent state for the Basque people.
- August 7: Explorer 6 is launched into orbit to photograph the Earth.
- September: Khrushchev visits U.S. for 13 days, and is denied access to Disneyland. Instead, he visits SeaWorld (then known as Marineland of the Pacific).
- September 13: Luna 2 is launched and becomes the first man-made object to reach the surface on the Moon.
- October 4–22: Luna 3 is launched to take photographs of the far side of the Moon. Approximately 70% of the far side was captured; however, on October 7, only 17 of the 29 photos successfully transmitted back to Earth due to issues with signal strength. On October 22, further contact with Luna 3 was lost.
- November: The Rwandan Revolution begins.

== 1960s ==
=== 1960 ===
- January 10: British prime minister Harold Macmillan delivers his first 'Wind of Change' speech in Accra. His speech hints at a move towards decolonisation of British possessions in Africa.
- January 19: The United States and Japan sign the Treaty of Mutual Cooperation and Security, a defence treaty allowing the US to maintain military bases in Japan.
- February 11: Skirmishes on the Chinese-Indian border cause the deaths of 12 Indian soldiers.
- February 16: France successfully tests its first atomic bomb, Gerboise Bleue, in the middle of the Algerian Sahara Desert.
- April: Jupiter IRBM deployment to Italy begins, placing nuclear missiles within striking range of Moscow (as with the Thor IRBMs deployed in the UK).
- April 25: The April Revolution ousts South Korean President Syngman Rhee from office and installs Yun Posun as president.
- May 1: American pilot Francis Gary Powers is shot down in his U-2 spy plane while flying at high altitude over the Soviet Union, resulting in the U-2 Incident, an embarrassment for President Eisenhower.
- June: Sino-Soviet split: the Chinese leadership, angered at being treated as the "junior partner" to the Soviet Union, declares its version of Communism superior and begin to compete with the Soviets for influence, thus adding a third dimension to the Cold War.
- June 15: Following the April Revolution the Second Republic of Korea is created.
- July 1: A Soviet fighter jet shoots down an RB-47 reconnaissance plane over the Barents Sea, resulting in the 1960 RB-47 shootdown incident.
- July 5: The Congo Crisis begins.
- July 31: Communist insurgents in Malaya are defeated.
- August 3: Niger becomes independent from France.
- August 6: Cuban leader Fidel Castro orders the nationalisation of all American-owned property.
- August 9: The Pathet Lao (communist) revolt in Laos begins.
- August 11: Chad becomes independent from France.
- August 17: Gabon becomes independent from France.
- September 30: Sukarno gives a speech in front of the fifteenth United Nations General Assembly titled "To Build The World Anew" in which he criticizes the United Nations for not being neutral and questions location of the United Nations Headquarters in New York, United States.
- October 12: While addressing the United Nations, Soviet Leader Nikita Khrushchev becomes agitated at criticisms of Soviet policies in eastern European. Khrushchev removes his shoe and thumps it on the lectern.
- October 19: The US places a partial embargo on Cuba, banning the export of all items except food and medicine.
- November 13: the Guatemalan Civil War begins.
- November 28: Mauritania becomes independent from France.
- December 20: Formation of the National Liberation Front (often called Viet Cong) by North Vietnam. It is a communist insurgent movement that vows to overthrow the anti-communist South Vietnamese regime. It is supplied extensively by North Vietnam, China, and the USSR eventually.

=== 1961 ===
- January 3: President Eisenhower severs diplomatic relations with Cuba.
- January 13: Patrice Lumumba, elected President of the Republic of the Congo (Léopoldville) is assassinated with the support of the CIA in the context of the Congo Crisis
- January 20: John F. Kennedy becomes President of the United States.
- January 31: Ham is launched into space as a part of Project Mercury, a mission to successfully place a human into orbit and return them safely.
- February 4: Angolan nationalists, including communists, begin an insurgency against Portuguese rule. This marked the beginning of the Portuguese Colonial War.
- February 12: Venera 1 is successfully launched by the Soviet Union with the intention of conducting a flyby mission to Venus.
- April 12: Yuri Gagarin becomes the first human in space and first to orbit the Earth when the Soviet Union successfully launches Vostok 1.
- April 17–19: Bay of Pigs Invasion: A CIA-backed invasion of Cuba by counter-revolutionaries ends in failure.
- April 21: Sierra Leone becomes independent from the UK under Commonwealth status.
- May 5: Alan Shepard becomes the first American to go into space when Freedom 7 is launched successfully.
- May 19: Venera 1 successfully reaches Venus being the first spacecraft to do so, but is unable to transmit any data.
- May 25: John F. Kennedy announces the US intention to put a man on the Moon – kickstarting Project Mercury, America's first human spaceflight program.
- June 4: Kennedy meets with Khrushchev in Vienna.
- June: Jupiter IRBM deployment to Turkey begins, joining the Jupiters deployed to Italy as well as the Thor IRBMs deployed to the UK as nuclear missiles placed within striking distance of Moscow.
- July 11: North Korea and China sign a defensive treaty, the Sino-North Korean Mutual Aid and Cooperation Friendship Treaty.
- July 19: The Nicaraguan Revolution begins.
- August 13: The Berlin Wall is built by the Soviets following the breakdown in talks to decide the future of Germany.
- August 17: Alliance for Progress aid to Latin America from the United States begins.
- September 1: The Soviet Union resumed testing of nuclear weapons in the atmosphere. The Eritrean War of Independence begins.
- September 4: John F. Kennedy signs the Foreign Assistance Act.
- September 18: UN Secretary General Dag Hammarskjöld dies in a plane crash on his way to negotiate a ceasefire in Katanga amidst the Congo Crisis
- September 28: Syria withdraws from the United Arab Republic.
- October 17: 22nd Soviet Party Congress held in USSR.
- October 27: Checkpoint Charlie standoff between US and Soviet tanks begins.
- October 31: The Soviet Union detonates the Tsar Bomba, the most powerful thermonuclear weapon ever tested, with an explosive yield of some 50 megatons.
- November 18: John F. Kennedy authorizes the deployment of 18,000 military advisors to support the struggle against communist insurgents in South Vietnam.
- December 2: Fidel Castro openly describes himself as a Marxist–Leninist.
- December 18: Republic of India invades the former Portuguese territory of Goa.

=== 1962 ===
- January 15: Indonesian Armed Forces starts to infiltrate into the Dutch overseas territory of western New Guinea as a part of Operation Trikora, the second and last confrontation between Indonesia and the Netherlands over imperialism.
- February 10: American pilot Francis Gary Powers is exchanged for senior KGB spy Colonel Rudolf Abel.
- February 20: John Glenn is launched into space aboard Friendship-7 becoming the first American to orbit the Earth. Despite having many delays in the launch itself, the flight is successful.
- July 1: Rwanda-Burundi becomes independent from Belgium.
- July 20: Neutralization of Laos is established by international agreement, but North Vietnam refuses to withdraw its personnel.
- August 2: Jamaica is granted independence by the UK.
- August 27: Mariner 2 is launched to make a flyby of Venus.
- August 31: Trinidad and Tobago was granted independence by the UK.
- September 8: Himalayan War: Chinese forces attack India, making claims on numerous border areas.
- September 26: the North Yemen Civil War begins between partisans of the Mutawakkilite Kingdom and supporters of the Yemen Arab Republic.
- October 9: Uganda becomes independent from the UK under Commonwealth status.
- October 16: Cuban Missile Crisis: the Soviets have secretly been installing military bases, including nuclear weapons, on Cuba, some 90 miles from the US mainland. Kennedy orders a "quarantine" (a naval blockade) of the island that intensifies the crisis and brings the US and the USSR to the brink of nuclear war. In the end, both sides reach a compromise. The Soviets back down and agree to withdraw their nuclear missiles from Cuba, in exchange for a secret agreement by Kennedy pledging to withdraw similar American missiles from Turkey and Italy, and guaranteeing that the US will not move against the Castro regime.
- October 20: the Sino-Indian War begins between India and the People's Republic of China about the disputed Aksai Chin region.
- November 1: The Soviet Union successfully launches Mars 1 with the intention of making a flyby of Mars.
- November 20: End of the Sino-Indian War. The People's Republic of China ends up withdrawing from most of the land it occupies but does end up occupying 14,700 square miles (38,000 km^{2}) of the Aksai Chin region and the area would remain a source of contention between the India and the People's Republic of China.
- December 7: The Brunei People's Party launched a rebellion against the British protectorate of Brunei. This event was considered to be one of the first stages of the Indonesia–Malaysia confrontation.
- December 14: Mariner 2 reaches Venus, becoming the first US spacecraft to reach Venus and another planet.

=== 1963 ===
- January 20: Indonesia declares that it rejects the formation of Malaysia, through the statement of their then-Minister of Foreign Affairs, Subandrio. Sukarno himself, as the first President of Indonesia, regarded Malaysia as a neo-colonial project and as a British puppet state in Southeast Asia. This marks the beginning of Indonesia-Malaysia confrontation.
- January 23: Kim Philby, the leader of the Cambridge Five, defects to the Soviet Union from Beirut. The fight for independence in Portuguese Guinea begins.
- February 10: the overthrow of Abd al-Karim Qasim.
- June 9: The Dhofar Liberation Front wages a war in Oman known as the Dhofar Rebellion.
- June 13: Mars 1 likely reaches Mars conducting flyby. Yet, radio contact was lost with the probe on March 21.
- June 16: Vostok 6 was launched, with Valentina Tereshkova becoming the first woman in space.
- June 20: The United States agrees to set up a hotline with the USSR, thus making direct communication possible.
- June 21: France announces that it is withdrawing its navy from the North Atlantic fleet of NATO.
- June 26: U.S. President John F. Kennedy delivers his "Ich bin ein Berliner" speech in Berlin.
- July 31: The Manila Accord was signed by the Republic of Indonesia, the Federation of Malaya (soon to become Malaysia), and the Philippines. This agreement contains an agreement on self-determination by the people of Sabah and Sarawak through free elections. A conference called Maphilindo was formed, which consisted of three countries that signed the Manila Accord.
- August 5: The Partial Test Ban Treaty is signed by the US, UK and USSR, prohibiting the testing of nuclear weapons anywhere except underground.
- September 16: Malaysia was formed, with Tunku Abdul Rahman as its first prime minister. This was considered to have violated the Manila Accord because Malaysia was formed before the Sabah and Sarawak self-determination election results were reported.
- September 25: A border war was fought between Morocco and Algeria.
- October 14: The Aden Emergency begins against British rule.
- November 2: South Vietnamese President Ngo Dinh Diem is assassinated in a coup supported by the CIA.
- November 22: John F. Kennedy is shot and killed in Dallas. There has been some speculation over whether communist countries, or even the CIA, were involved in the assassination, but those theories remain controversial. Kennedy's vice-president Lyndon B. Johnson becomes President of the United States.
- December 12: Kenya becomes independent from the UK under Commonwealth status.

=== 1964 ===
- January 12: the Arab-dominated government of the Zanzibar Sultanate is overthrown by John Okello, establishing the new people's republic. The new regime orders a massacre against minorities, resulting in the deaths of hundred to thousand Arabs and South Asians in Zanzibar.
- January 27: France recognizes the People's Republic of China. The Republic of China severs diplomatic relations with France on February 10.
- March 31–April 1: A military-led coup d'état overthrows president João Goulart in Brazil. Goulart's proposals, such as land reform and bigger control of the state in the economy, were seen as communist.
- April 20: U.S. President Lyndon Johnson in New York, and Soviet First Secretary Nikita Khrushchev in Moscow, announce simultaneously plans to cut back production of materials for making nuclear weapons.
- May 27: Jawaharlal Nehru dies. The Colombian conflict begins.
- July 4: The Rhodesian Bush War begins when African nationalist / Marxist insurgents rebel against colonial rule in Rhodesia (modern-day Zimbabwe). Nyasaland (renamed Malawi upon independence) becomes independent from the UK.
- August 4: U.S. President Lyndon B. Johnson claims that North Vietnamese naval vessels had fired on two American destroyers in the Gulf of Tonkin. Although there was a first attack, it was later shown that American vessels had entered North Vietnamese territory first, and that the claim of second attack had been unfounded. The Gulf of Tonkin incident leads to the open involvement of the United States in the Vietnam War, after the Gulf of Tonkin Resolution.
- September 21: Malta becomes independent from the UK.
- September 24: The Mozambican War of Independence begins in Portuguese Mozambique.
- October 12: The first spaceflight to carry multiple crewman into orbit was conducted by Voskhod 1.
- October 14: Leonid Brezhnev succeeds Khrushchev to become General Secretary of the Communist Party of the Soviet Union, with Alexei Kosygin as his Premier.
- October 16: China tests its first atomic bomb. The test makes China the world's fifth nuclear power.
- October 24: Northern Rhodesia renamed Zambia becomes independent from the UK.
- November 28: Mariner 4 was launched.

=== 1965 ===
- January 24: Winston Churchill dies.
- February 18: The Gambia becomes independent from the UK under Commonwealth status.
- March 18: Alexei Leonov conducts the first extravehicular activity or spacewalk in history from his spacecraft, Voskhod 2 in space.
- March 23: Ranger 9 transmitted live footage of the surface of the Moon before crashing into its surface.
- April 24: Dominican Civil War: Forces loyal to former President Juan Bosch overthrow current leader Donald Reid Cabral.
- June 3: Ed White conducts the first American spacewalk from his spacecraft, Gemini IV.
- July 14–15: Mariner 4 successfully takes pictures of the surface of Mars.
- August 5: Beginning of the Indo-Pakistani war of 1965.
- August 9: Singapore gains independence after being expelled from Malaysia.
- October 1: Six Indonesian generals are killed by the 30 September Movement during an abortive coup d'état later blamed on the Communist Party of Indonesia. Mass killings of suspected communists begin shortly after.
- November 1: The Chadian Civil War was waged between rebels and the Chadian government.
- November 11: The white-dominated government of Rhodesia declares its independence which was regarded as an illegal proclamation by British Prime Minister Harold Wilson. Rhodesia was never formally recognised by any country but receives support from neighboring Portuguese Mozambique and the South African apartheid regime in their war against African guerrillas that determined to oust the white government.
- November 1965: Venera 3 was launched.
- November 22: DN Aidit, Chairman of Communist Party of Indonesia, is executed by the Indonesian Army in Boyolali after becoming a fugitive as a consequence of the 30 September Movement which are blamed on the Communist Party of Indonesia.
- December 4: The Gemini 7 completes 206 orbits around the Earth, equating to roughly one trip to the Moon.

=== 1966 ===
- January 31: Luna 9 is launched.
- February 3: Luna 9 successfully lands on the Moon becoming the first spacecraft to softly land on another extraterrestrial body.
- March 1: Venera 3 becomes the first man-made object to impact another planet.
- March 10: France withdraws from NATO command structure.
- March 11: President Sukarno of Indonesia signs a document, handing over authority to Major General Suharto. This led to Suharto later establishing the pro-western and anti-communist New Order regime. This regime would remain in power until 1998.
- May 8: Communist China detonates a third nuclear device.
- May 26: Guiana becomes independent from the UK under Commonwealth status.
- May 30: Surveyor 1 is launched.
- June 2: Surveyor 1 becomes the first American spacecraft to softly land on another extraterrestrial body.
- August 11: The Jakarta Accord is signed by the Indonesian Foreign Minister Adam Malik and Malaysian Deputy Prime Minister Tunku Abdul Razak ending the hostility between Indonesia and Malaysia.
- August 26: South African Border War begins.
- September 30: Bechuanaland renamed Botswana becomes independent from the UK.
- October 5: Beginning of low-level armed clashes in Korean DMZ between North Korea and South Korea backed by the United States.
- November 30: Barbados becomes independent from the UK.

=== 1967 ===
- March 11: The Cambodian Civil War begins with the Samlaut Uprising.
- March 12: General Suharto officially overthrows Sukarno and appointed as president of Indonesia. Indonesia switches sides from being friendly with Eastern Bloc countries such as the Soviet Union, the People's Republic of China, North Korea, and Cuba during the Sukarno administration to becoming friends with western countries such as the United States during the Suharto administration or New Order era. Foreign capital and investors began to enter Indonesia.
- April 21: The Hellenic Armed Forces successfully stage a coup d'état against the Greek government, leading to the Greek Junta to rule Greece until 1974.
- April 25: 33 Latin American and Caribbean countries sign the Treaty of Tlatelolco in Mexico City, which seek the prohibition of nuclear weapons in Latin America and the Caribbean.
- May 18: Yuri Andropov becomes chairman of the KGB.
- May 23: The United Arab Republic blocks the Straits of Tiran, then expels UN peacekeepers and moves its army into the Sinai Peninsula in preparation for possible attack on Israel.
- May 25: Uprising in Naxalbari, India marking the expansion of Maoism as a violent, anti-US and anti-Soviet, revolutionary movement across a number of developing countries.
- May 30: The Nigerian state of Biafra secedes from the rest of Nigeria, declaring itself as the Republic of Biafra.
- June 5: In response to Egypt's aggression, Israel invades the Sinai Peninsula, beginning the Six-Day War.
- June 17: China detonates its first hydrogen bomb.
- June 23: U.S. President Lyndon B. Johnson meets with Soviet Premier Alexei Kosygin in Glassboro, New Jersey for a three-day summit.
- July 1: Beginning of the War of Attrition.
- July 6: The Nigerian Civil War begins in response to Biafra's declaration of independence.
- August 8: Bangkok Declaration is established to quell the communist threat in Southeast Asia. This creates ASEAN.
- October 8: Che Guevara is captured in Bolivia by U.S. trained Bolivian rangers.
- October 9: Che Guevara is executed after being captured the day before.
- November 29: Robert McNamara announces that he will resign as U.S. Secretary of Defense to become President of the World Bank.

=== 1968 ===
- January 30: Tet Offensive in South Vietnam begins.
- March 1: The years of Lead start in Italy with the Battle of Valle Giulia clash between far-right and far-left militants.
- March 12: Mauritius becomes independent from the UK under Commonwealth status.
- March 18: The Moro conflict begins in Southern Philippines.
- March 30: Johnson suspends bombings over North Vietnam and announces he is not running for reelection.
- June 8: Tet Offensive ends; while an American military victory, it raises questions over America's military chances in Vietnam.
- June 17: The Second Malayan Emergency begins.
- July 1: The Treaty on the Non-Proliferation of Nuclear Weapons (NPT) is opened for signature.
- July 17: Abdul Rahman Arif, the President of Iraq at that time was overthrown by a coup staged by Iraq Ba'athist Party. The revolution eventually lead to the installation of the Ba'athist government in Iraq.
- August 20: Prague Spring Reforms in Communist Czechoslovakia result in Warsaw Pact, led by Soviet Red Army, crushing Czechoslovak revolt.
- September 6: Swaziland becomes independent from the UK.
- October 3: Peruvian General Juan Velasco Alvarado overthrows President Fernando Belaunde Terry in a military coup.
- October 12: Spanish Guinea (modern day Equatorial Guinea) becomes independent from Spain.
- December 23: The captain and crew of the USS Pueblo are released by North Korea.
- December 21–27: The launch of Apollo 8, the first crewed spaceflight to enter the gravitational influence of another celestial body and to orbit the Moon. The crew would complete ten orbits, then return to Earth without landing on the Moon.

=== 1969 ===
- January 20: Richard Nixon becomes President of the United States.
- March 2: Border clashes between the Soviet Union and China.
- March 17: the U.S. begins bombing Communist sanctuaries in Cambodia.
- July 16: Apollo 11 is launched.
- July 20: the U.S. accomplishes the first crewed Moon landing, Apollo 11. Crewed by Neil Armstrong, "Buzz" Aldrin, and Michael Collins.
- July 24: Apollo 11 returns to Earth.
- July 25: "Vietnamization" begins with U.S. troop withdrawals from Vietnam and the burden of combat being placed on the South Vietnamese.
- September 1: Muammar Gaddafi overthrows the Libyan monarchy and expels British and American personnel. Libya aligns itself with the Soviet Union.
- September 2: North Vietnamese leader Ho Chi Minh dies.
- October 21: Siad Barre overthrows the government of Somalia in a bloodless coup. He declares himself President of Somalia and reorganizes the country into a one-party communist state; the Somali Democratic Republic.
- November 17: The Strategic Arms Limitation Talks begin in Helsinki.
- November 27–December 6: the al-Wadiah War was fought between South Yemen and Saudi Arabia.
- December 12: A bomb planted by far-right extremists sets off in a bank in Milan, Italy, killing 17 people and injuring 88. This event (remembered as the Piazza Fontana bombing) is one of the bloodiest terrorist attacks Italy would receive during the years of lead.

== 1970s ==
=== 1970 ===
- January 15: The Nigerian Civil War ends with Biafra being re-integrated into Nigeria.
- March 5: Treaty on the Non-Proliferation of Nuclear Weapons, ratified by the United Kingdom, the Soviet Union and the United States, among others, enters into force.
- March 18: Lon Nol takes power in Cambodia and establishes the Khmer Republic. Khmer Rouge and Vietnamese Communists attack the new regime, which wants to end North Vietnamese presence in Cambodia.
- August 7: The War of Attrition ends with a ceasefire.
- August 12: The Soviet Union and West Germany sign the Treaty of Moscow.
- August 17: Venera 7 is launched.
- September 6: Black September begins in Jordan.
- October 24: Salvador Allende becomes president of Chile after being confirmed by the Chilean congress.
- November 18: United States' aid to Cambodia to support the Lon Nol regime begins.
- December 15: Venera 7 lands on Venus becoming the first spacecraft to softly land on another planet.

=== 1971 ===
- January 25: Idi Amin launches a successful coup d'état against Milton Obote in Uganda and declares himself President of Uganda. Under Amin, Uganda would switch allegiances to the Eastern Bloc and develop strong ties to the Soviet Union and East Germany.
- February 8: South Vietnamese forces enter Laos to briefly cut the Ho Chi Minh Trail.
- February 11: Seabed Arms Control Treaty is signed banning the placement of nuclear weapons outside of a country's 12-mile (22.2 km) coastal zone.
- March 10: Dominion of Ceylon declared under emergency conditions after communist People's Liberation Front attacks the American embassy.
- March 25 : Bangladeshi genocide From The West Pakistani Troops until 16 December
- March 26: Bangladeshi Declaration of Independence and Bangladesh Liberation War begin
- April 19: Salyut 1 is launched becoming the first space station.
- May 15: Anwar Sadat's Corrective Revolution purges Nasserist members of the government and security forces, and eventually expels the Soviet military from Egypt.
- May 28: Mars 3 is launched.
- May 30: Mariner 9 is launched.
- July 19–22: a communist-backed coup attempted unsuccessfully against Jaafar Nimeiry in Sudan.
- September: 105 Soviet officials expelled from Great Britain by Prime Minister Edward Heath in Operation FOOT.
- September 3: Four-Power Agreement on Berlin is signed by the United Kingdom, the Soviet Union, France, and the United States.
- October 11: Salyut 1 burns up in the atmosphere.
- October 25: The United Nations General Assembly passes Resolution 2758, recognizing the People's Republic of China as the sole legitimate government of China, causing Taiwan to lose its UN membership.
- October 26: Mathieu Kérékou takes control of the Republic of Dahomey, renaming it Benin and declaring it a Marxist–Leninist state.
- November 14: Mariner 9 arrives at Mars orbit becoming the first spacecraft to orbit another planet.
- December 2: Mars 3 arrives in Mars orbit and deploys its lander. The lander is successful in becoming the first spacecraft to softly land on Mars but transmits for 20 seconds before losing contact.
- December 3: India enters the Bangladesh Liberation War after Pakistan launches preemptive air strikes on Indian airfields.
- December 16: Lt. Gen A. A. K. Niazi, CO of the Pakistan Army forces located in East Pakistan surrenders unconditionally by signing the Instrument of Surrender which is accepted by Lieutenant General Jagjit Singh Aurora, joint commander of the Bangladesh-India Allied Forces. Bangladesh is officially recognized, first by Bhutan and India, then the Eastern Bloc, and finally internationally recognised worldwide.

=== 1972 ===
- February 21: Nixon visits China, the first visit by a U.S. president since the establishment of the People's Republic of China.
- March 30: Viet Cong goes to the offensive in South Vietnam, only to be repulsed by the South Vietnamese regime with major American air support.
- April: The Ikiza mass killings occurred in Burundi committed by the Tutsi-dominated army against the Hutus.
- April 10: Biological Weapons Convention is signed banning the production, development and stockpiling of biological weapons.
- May 22: Richard Nixon attends Moscow Summit (1972), becoming the first US president to visit Moscow.
- May 26: Strategic Arms Limitation Talks (SALT I) agreement signals the beginning of détente between the U.S. and USSR.
- September 1: Bobby Fischer defeats Russian Boris Spassky in a chess match in Reykjavík, Iceland, becoming the first official American chess champion (see Match of the Century).
- September 2–28: The Summit Series, an ice hockey tournament between Canada and Soviet Union.
- September 21: Philippine president Ferdinand Marcos declares martial law, officially in response to the growing communist threat in the Philippines.
- September 26: The short border war occurred between the Yemen Arab Republic and South Yemen.
- December 18: Richard Nixon announces the beginning of a massive bombing campaign in North Vietnam.

=== 1973 ===
- January 27: The Paris Peace Accords end American involvement in the Vietnam War. Congress cuts off funds for the continued bombing of Indochina.
- February: Balochi separatists launched a five-year long guerilla war against the Pakistani government in order to create a separate Balochistan nation.
- February 21: Vientiane Treaty is signed as a cease-fire agreement for the Laotian Civil War. The treaty calls for the removal of all foreign soldiers from Laos . The treaty calls for a coalition government to be created but never materialized.
- July 10: The Bahamas becomes independent from the UK.
- July 29: To help further legitimize their rule, the Greek Junta abolished the Greek monarchy after a sham referendum.
- September: West Germany and East Germany are each admitted to the United Nations.
- September 11: Chilean coup d'état — The democratically elected Marxist president of Chile, Salvador Allende, is deposed and dies of a gunshot wound during a military coup led by General Augusto Pinochet.
- October 6: Yom Kippur War — Israel is attacked by Egypt and Syria, the war ends with a ceasefire.
- October 14: An uprising occurred in Thailand.
- October 22: Egypt defects to the American camp by accepting a U.S. cease-fire proposal during the October 1973 war.
- November 11: The Soviet Union announces that, because of its opposition to the recent overthrow of the government of Chilean President Salvador Allende, it will not play a World Cup Soccer match against the Chilean team if the match is held in Santiago.

=== 1974 ===
- February 7: Grenada becomes independent from the UK.
- April 25: Portuguese Armed Forces revolt against the authoritarian regime of Estado Novo. Fascism in Portugal officially ended, and Spain became the last and only fascist country that still stood at the time.
- June 26: NATO holds a summit in Brussels, the first one since 1957 to be held.
- June 28: The Moscow Summit begins.
- July 20: Turkey invaded Cyprus after a coup d'état conducted by the Greek junta.
- July 24: The Greek Junta gives up its power after the Cypriot Junta government of the 1974 Cypriot coup d'état fell on July 23. This initiated a new period of Greek history known as Metapolitefsi, which led to the restoration of democracy in Greece.
- August 9: Gerald Ford becomes President of the United States upon the resignation of Nixon.
- September 4: The United States and East Germany begin diplomatic relations.
- September 12: The pro-Western monarch of Ethiopia, Haile Selassie, is ousted by a Marxist military junta known as the Derg.
- November 24: The SALT II Agreement is drafted at the Vladivostok Summit Meeting on Arms Control.
- December 8: Following a referendum, Greece voted to confirm their abolition of their monarchy the previous year.

=== 1975 ===
- January 3: The Trade Act of 1974, including the Jackson–Vanik amendment, is signed into law in the United States.
- April 13: Tensions between the Maronite Christians and Muslims ignited the Lebanese Civil War.
- April 18: The communist Khmer Rouge, under the leadership of Pol Pot, take power in Cambodia. Beginning of the Cambodian genocide.
- April 30: North Vietnam wins the Vietnam War. The South Vietnam regime falls with the surrender of Saigon and the two countries are later united under a communist government.
- May 12: Mayagüez incident: the Khmer Rouge seize an American naval ship, prompting American intervention to recapture the ship and its crew. In the end, the crew is released from captivity.
- June 8: Venera 9, a Soviet uncrewed space mission to Venus, is launched.
- June 25: Portugal withdraws from Angola and Mozambique, where Marxist governments are installed, the former with backing from Cuban troops. Civil war engulfs both nations and involves Angolans, Mozambicans, South Africans, and Cubans, with the superpowers supporting their respective ideologies.
- July 5: Cape Verde becomes independent from Portugal.
- July 6: Comoros becomes independent from France.
- July 12: São Tomé and Príncipe becomes independent from Portugal.
- July 15: The Apollo-Soyuz Test Project takes place. It is the first joint flight of the US and Soviet space programs. The mission is seen as a symbol of détente and an end to the "space race".
- August 1: Helsinki Final Act of the Conference on Security and Co-operation in Europe signed by the United States, Canada, the Soviet Union and Europe.
- October 9: Andrei Sakharov is awarded the Nobel Peace Prize.
- October 30: Western Sahara War begins between Morocco, Mauritania and Polisario Front.
- November: Operation Condor begins in South America.
- November 11: The Angolan Civil War begins immediately after Angola achieved independence from Portugal.
- November 20: Francisco Franco dies, and under Juan Carlos I, Spain becomes a democracy.
- November 25: Suriname officially gains independence from the Kingdom of the Netherlands.
- November 28: After a small-scale civil war, Timor-Leste under the Fretilin declares its independence.
- November 29: Pathet Lao takes power in Laos.
- December 7: In Operation Seroja, the Indonesian National Armed Forces invades East Timor. The day before, US President Gerald Ford had given the green light for the invasion in a meeting with Indonesian President Suharto in Jakarta. An estimated 100,000–180,000 people will be killed or starve to death in the 25-year occupation.

=== 1976 ===
- January 8: Chinese Premier Zhou Enlai dies of cancer.
- February: Soviet and Cuban forces install a communist government in Angola.
- March 24: The National Reorganization Process takes power in Argentina following a successful military coup and launches military action against Argentine-based guerrillas. Jorge Rafael Videla is installed as president.
- May 4: The Corsican conflict begins, with the aim of an independent Corsican state against the French government by Corsican nationalists.
- June 29: The Seychelles becomes independent from the UK, as a republic in the Commonwealth of Nations.
- July 2: Vietnam is officially reunited under a communist regime.
- July 20: U.S. Military personnel withdraw from Thailand.
- September 1: Inception of Safari Club.
- September 9: Death of Mao Zedong.
- December 4: Insurgency in Aceh begins. Jean-Bédel Bokassa proclaimed himself as Emperor of the Central African Empire.

=== 1977 ===
- January 1: Charter 77 is signed by Czechoslovak intellectuals, including Václav Havel.
- January 20: Jimmy Carter becomes President of the United States.
- March 8: A rebellion occurred in the Shaba Province, Zaire.
- May 30: The Mozambican Civil War begins.
- June 6: U.S. Secretary of State Cyrus Vance assures skeptics that the Carter administration will hold the Soviet Union accountable for its recent crackdowns on human rights activists.
- June 27: The French Territory of the Afars and the Issas (modern day Djibouti) becomes independent from France.
- June 30: The Carter administration cancels the planned Rockwell B-1 Lancer bomber.
- June 30: SEATO formally dissolves after a loss of confidence in the organisation.
- July 21–24: Egypt and Libya fought a war at the Egyptian-Libyan border.
- July 23: The Ogaden War begins when Somalia attacks Ethiopia.

=== 1978 ===
- January 29: The Chadian–Libyan conflict begins over the Aouzou Strip.
- March 15: The Ogaden War ends with a cease-fire.
- March 16: Italian Prime Minister Aldo Moro is kidnapped in Rome by a far-left extremist terrorist group called the Red Brigades. His body would be found on the 9th of May after 55 days of captivity.
- April 27: President of Afghanistan Sardar Mohammed Daoud's government is overthrown when he is murdered in a coup led by pro-communist rebels.
- May 11: The second rebellion in the Shaba Province, Zaire occurred.
- October 1: Tuvalu becomes independent from the UK as a member of the Commonwealth.
- November 3: Dominica becomes independent from the UK.
- December 18: Deng Xiaoping announces the reform and opening up of China.
- December 25: Vietnam invades Cambodia.

=== 1979 ===
- January 1: The United States and China normalize diplomatic relations.
- January 7: Vietnam deposes the Khmer Rouge and installs a pro-Vietnam, pro-Soviet government known as the People's Republic of Kampuchea.
- January 16: The Iranian Revolution ousts the pro-Western Shah, Mohammed Reza Pahlavi, and installs a theocracy under Grand Ayatollah Ruhollah Khomeini. The Central Treaty Organization dissolves as a result.
- February 17: Sino-Vietnamese War, China launches a punitive attack on Vietnam to punish it for invading Cambodia
- February 22: Saint Lucia becomes independent from the UK.
- February 24: A war broke out between Yemen Arab Republic and South Yemen.
- May 4: Margaret Thatcher is elected Prime Minister of the United Kingdom, becoming the first female to lead a major Western democracy.
- May 9: Civil war breaks out in El Salvador between Marxist-led insurgents and the U.S.-backed government.
- June 2: Pope John Paul II begins his first pastoral visit to his native Poland.
- June 18: U.S. President Jimmy Carter and Soviet leader Leonid Brezhnev sign the SALT II agreement, outlining limitations and guidelines for nuclear weapons.
- July 3: President Carter signs the first directive for financial aid to opponents of the pro-Soviet regime in Kabul, Afghanistan.
- July 16: Saddam Hussein becomes President of Iraq after Ahmed Hassan al-Bakr steps down.
- July 17: Marxist-led Sandinista revolutionaries overthrow the U.S.-backed Somoza dictatorship in Nicaragua. The Contra insurgency begins shortly thereafter.
- August 3: Francisco Macias Nguema was deposed by a coup led by Teodoro Obiang Nguema Mbasogo.
- September: Nur Mohammed Taraki, The Marxist president of Afghanistan, is deposed and murdered. The post of president is taken up by Prime Minister Hafizullah Amin.
- November 4: Islamist Iranian students take over the American embassy in support of the Iranian Revolution. The Iran hostage crisis lasts until January 20, 1981.
- November 20–December 4: Juhayman al-Otaybi and his followers seized the Grand Mosque in Mecca, Saudi Arabia.
- December 12: NATO Double-Track Decision – NATO offers mutual limitation of ballistic missiles combined with the threat that in case of disagreement NATO would deploy more middle-range nuclear weapons in Western Europe.
- December 21: The Rhodesian Bush War ends with the signing of the Lancaster House Agreement. Zimbabwe is granted independence from the United Kingdom.
- December 25: The Soviet Union invades Afghanistan to oust Hafizullah Amin, beginning the Soviet–Afghan War and resulting in the end of Détente.

== 1980s ==
=== 1980 ===
- January 3–4: President Jimmy Carter withdraws the SALT II Treaty from Senate confirmation and bans technology sales to the Soviet Union.
- January 27: The Carter Doctrine commits the United States to defending the Gulf States from external invasion.
- February 13: Britain's MI6 commences its indirect and direct covert operations in Afghanistan, to support the Afghan mujahideen against Soviet intervention.
- February 25: A military coup occurred in Suriname eventually lead to the establishment of a military regime in the country.
- March 21: The United States and its allies boycott the 1980 Summer Olympics (July 15 – August 3) in Moscow.
- April 17: Robert Mugabe becomes Prime Minister of Zimbabwe.
- April 30: Iranian Embassy in London is taken over by DRFLA militants starting a 6-day-long hostage situation.
- May 4: Josip Broz Tito, communist leader of Yugoslavia since 1945, dies at the age of 87 in Ljubljana.
- May 17: Peru begins experiences a civil conflict between the government and the Marxist–Leninist guerilla groups, most notably the Shining Path.
- May 18–27: An anti-government uprising occurred in Gwangju, South Korea.
- 3 July: the CIA begins Operation Cyclone - a program to arm and finance the Afghan mujahideen fighting the Soviets in Afghanistan.
- August 31: In Poland, the Gdańsk Agreement is signed after a wave of strikes which began at the Lenin Shipyards in Gdańsk. The agreement allows greater civil rights, such as the establishment of a trade union, known as Solidarity, independent of communist control.
- September 22: Saddam's Iraq started an invasion of Iran, which ignites the Iran–Iraq War.
- October 23: Soviet Premier Alexei Kosygin resigns due to ill-health; he dies on December 18.

=== 1981 ===
- January 17: Martial law was lifted by Ferdinand Marcos in preparation for the visit of Pope John Paul II.
- January 20: Ronald Reagan inaugurated 40th President of the United States. Reagan is elected on a platform opposed to the concessions of détente. Also that day the Iran hostage crisis ends.
- March 30: Two months after his inauguration Ronald Reagan is shot in the chest while leaving a Washington hotel. The gunman, John Hinckley, is found to be mentally unhinged and obsessed with actress Jodie Foster.
- April 1: The United States suspends economic aid to Nicaragua.
- April 6: The Somaliland War of Independence was waged by the Somali National Movement in northern Somalia.
- May 13: While riding in an open-topped car through the Vatican, Pope John Paul II is shot four times in the abdomen and right arm. The gunman, Mehmet Ali Agca, is a Turkish Kurd with uncertain motives.
- August 19: Gulf of Sidra Incident: Libyan planes attack U.S. jets in the Gulf of Sidra, which Libya has illegally annexed. Two Libyan jets are shot down; no American losses are suffered.
- September 21: Belize becomes independent from the UK. 1,500 British soldiers remain to deter Guatemala from attacking the country over territorial disputes.
- October 6: President Anwar Sadat of Egypt is shot and killed in Cairo during the annual victory parade.
- October 27: A Soviet submarine, the U137, runs aground not far from the Swedish naval base at Karlskrona.
- November 23: The U.S. Central Intelligence Agency (CIA) begins to support anti-Sandinista Contras.
- December 13: Gen. Wojciech Jaruzelski, having been appointed First Secretary of the Polish United Workers' Party, introduces martial law, which drastically restricts normal life, in an attempt to crush the Solidarity trade union and the political opposition against communist rule.

=== 1982 ===
- February 24: President Ronald Reagan announces the "Caribbean Basin Initiative" to prevent the overthrow of governments in the region by the forces of communism.
- March 22: President Ronald Reagan signs P.L. 97-157 denouncing the government of the Soviet Union that it should cease its abuses of the basic human rights of its citizens.
- April 2: Argentina invades the Falkland Islands, starting the Falklands War.
- May 30: Spain joins NATO.
- June 6: Israel invades Lebanon to end raids and clashes with Syrian troops based there.
- June 14: Falkland Islands liberated by British task force. End of the Falklands War.
- August 1: Rebels attempt to seize control of Kenya, with the supposed assist of the communists in a coup d'état. The coup failed.
- November 10: Leonid Brezhnev dies from a heart failure with his funeral being held five days later.
- November 14: Yuri Andropov becomes General Secretary of the Soviet Union.

=== 1983 ===
- January: Soviet spy Dieter Gerhardt is arrested in New York.
- March 8: In speech to the National Association of Evangelicals, Reagan labels the Soviet Union an "evil empire".
- March 23: Ronald Reagan proposes the Strategic Defense Initiative (SDI, or "Star Wars").
- June 5: The Second Sudanese Civil War begins.
- July 7: Ten-year-old American child Samantha Smith accepts the invitation of Soviet leader Yuri Andropov and visits the Soviet Union with her parents. Smith had written to Andropov to ask if he would "vote to have a war or not?". Smith's letter, published in the Soviet newspaper Pravda, prompted Andropov to reply and invite the girl to the USSR. The widely publicized event leads to other Soviet–American cultural exchanges.
- July 22: Martial law in Poland is lifted.
- July 23: The Sri Lankan Civil War begins between the LTTE and the Sri Lankan government.
- July 30: Sri Lankan government bans all its major communist parties claiming they were involved in ethnic riots, Soviet Union intervenes to unban the parties.
- August 4: Thomas Sankara overthrows Jean-Baptiste Ouédraogo and becomes president. He also renamed the country of Upper Volta to Burkina Faso a year later.
- August 19: During a two-hour meeting with 9 democratic senators Soviet Leader Yuri Andropov proposes that the Soviet Union and the United States agree to a complete ban on antisatellite weapons, and he pledged that the Soviet Union would not place any such weapons in space as long as other countries refrain from doing so.
- August 21: Former senator Benigno "Ninoy" S. Aquino was assassinated at Manila International Airport (now Ninoy Aquino International Airport).
- September 1: Civilian Korean Air Lines Flight 007, with 269 passengers, including U.S. Congressman Larry McDonald, is shot down by Soviet interceptor aircraft.
- September 26: The 1983 Soviet nuclear false alarm incident occurs. The U.S.S.R. nuclear early warning system reports launch of multiple U.S. intercontinental ballistic missiles. Stanislav Yevgrafovich Petrov, an officer of the Soviet Air Defence Forces, correctly identifies them as false alarms. This decision is seen as having prevented a retaliatory nuclear attack based on erroneous data on the United States and its NATO allies, which likely would have resulted in nuclear war and the deaths of hundreds of millions of people.
- October 25: U.S. forces invade the Caribbean island of Grenada in an attempt to overthrow the Communist government, expel Cuban troops, and abort the construction of a Soviet-funded airstrip.
- November 2: Exercise Able Archer 83 – Soviet anti-aircraft misinterpret a test of NATO's nuclear warfare procedures as a fake cover for an actual NATO attack; in response, Soviet nuclear forces are put on high alert.
- December 10: The National Reorganization Process military junta of Argentina is dissolved by democratically elected president Raúl Alfonsín.

=== 1984 ===
- January: U.S. President Ronald Reagan outlines foreign policy which reinforces his previous statements.
- January 1: Brunei gains independence from the UK.
- February 13: Konstantin Chernenko is named General Secretary of the Soviet Communist Party.
- May 24: the U.S. Congress ratifies the Boland Amendment banning U.S. aid to the contras.
- June 1–10: Operation Blue Star begins.
- July 28: various allies of the Soviet Union boycott the 1984 Summer Olympics (July 28 – August 12) in Los Angeles.
- August 11: during a microphone sound check for his weekly radio address, President Ronald Reagan jokes about bombing the Soviet Union. "My fellow Americans", Reagan says. "I'm pleased to tell you today that I've signed legislation that will outlaw Russia forever. We begin bombing in five minutes." The quip is not aired but is leaked to the press. The Soviet Union temporarily puts its defense forces on high alert.
- October 19: Father Jerzy Popiełuszko assassinated.
- October 31: Indira Gandhi assassinated.
- December 16: Margaret Thatcher and the UK government, in a plan to open new channels of dialog with Soviet leadership candidates, meet with Mikhail Gorbachev at Chequers.

=== 1985 ===
- February 6: The Reagan Doctrine commits the United States of America to supporting anti-Communist insurgencies in the Third World.
- March 10: General Secretary of the Communist Party of the Soviet Union Konstantin Chernenko dies.
- March 11: Mikhail Gorbachev becomes leader of the Soviet Union.
- March 15: Military rule ends in Brazil.
- March 24, 1985: Major Arthur D. Nicholson, a US Army Military Intelligence officer is shot to death by a Soviet sentry in East Germany. He is listed as the last US casualty in the Cold War.
- April 11: Enver Hoxha dies. Ramiz Alia takes over as First Secretary of the Party of Labor of Albania, becoming the de facto leader of Albania.
- April 22: The Trial of the Juntas convenes to prosecute the members of the National Reorganization Process (the military junta that governed Argentina from 1976 to 1983) for war crimes and crimes against humanity committed during its existence.
- May 20: John Anthony Walker is arrested by the FBI.
- August 6: Coinciding with the 40th anniversary of the atomic bombings of Hiroshima and Nagasaki, the Soviet Union begins what it has announced is a 5-month unilateral moratorium on the testing of nuclear weapons. The Reagan administration dismisses the dramatic move as nothing more than propaganda and refuses to follow suit. Gorbachev declares several extensions, but the United States fails to reciprocate, and the moratorium comes to an end on February 5, 1987.
- November 7: Crisis of Sigonella, diplomatic conflict between Italy and the United States.
- November 21: Reagan and Gorbachev meet for the first time at a summit in Geneva, Switzerland, where they agree to two (later three) more summits.

=== 1986 ===
- January 13: The South Yemen Civil War begins.
- January 24: The South Yemen Civil War ends with a brief internal conflict in the Yemeni Socialist Party.
- February 13: France launches Operation Epervier (Sparrowhawk) in an effort to repulse the Libyan invasion of Chad.
- February 25: The People Power Revolution takes place in the Philippines, overthrowing President Ferdinand Marcos. The Philippines' first female president, Corazon Aquino, was installed as president.
- April 15: U.S. planes bomb Libya in Operation El Dorado Canyon.
- April 26: Chernobyl disaster: a Soviet nuclear power plant in Ukraine explodes, resulting in the worst nuclear power plant accident in history.
- July 22: The Surinamese Interior War occurs.
- October 11–12: Reykjavik Summit: a breakthrough in nuclear arms control.
- October 19: The pro-Marxist interim President of Mozambique, Samora Machel, is killed when the aircraft he is travelling in crashes in South Africa.
- November 3: Iran–Contra affair: the Reagan administration publicly announces that it has been selling arms to Iran in exchange for hostages and illegally transferring the profits to the Contra rebels in Nicaragua.

=== 1987 ===
- January 16: Natives within the Party who oppose his policies of economic redevelopment (Perestroika). It is Gorbachev's hope that through initiatives of openness, debate and participation, that the Soviet people will support Perestroika.
- February 25: Phosphorite War breaks out in Estonia.
- April 15: An insurrection occurred in Sri Lanka by the Marxist–Leninist group, JVP.
- June 12: During a visit to West Berlin, U.S. President Ronald Reagan challenges Soviet General Secretary Mikhail Gorbachev in a speech: "Mr. Gorbachev, tear down this wall!" (The Berlin Wall).
- June 15: Famous Italian Singer and Songwriter Adriano Celentano lands in Moscow to present his movie Joan Lui in Soviet theaters, another step that opens the Soviet world to the Western one.
- September 10: The Battle of Cuito Cuanavale, Angola begins and further intensifies the South African Border War.
- September 30: Mohammad Najibullah becomes President of Afghanistan and implements a policy of National Reconciliation as a means of putting an end to the Soviet–Afghan War as well as beginning an end to Soviet influence in the country.
- December: A short war was fought between Thailand and Laos.
- December 8: The Intermediate-Range Nuclear Forces Treaty is signed in Washington, D.C. by U.S. President Ronald Reagan and Soviet leader Mikhail Gorbachev. Some later claim this was the unofficial beginning of the end of the Cold War. Gorbachev agrees to START I treaty.
- December 9: The First Intifada was waged by Palestinians against the Israeli government.

=== 1988 ===
- February 20: The First Nagorno-Karabakh War was fought between Armenia and Azerbaijan.
- February 22: USS Yorktown and USS Caron are rammed off the Crimean Peninsula after entering Soviet territorial waters.
- May 11: Kim Philby (Harold Adrian Russell Philby), the high-ranking UK intelligence officer who defected to the Soviet Union, dies in Moscow.
- May 15: The Soviets begin withdrawing from Afghanistan.
- May 29–June 1: Reagan and Gorbachev meet in Moscow. INF Treaty ratified. When asked if he still believes that the Soviet Union is still an evil empire, Reagan replies he was talking about "another time, another era".
- October 5: Chile's Augusto Pinochet loses a national plebiscite on his rule.
- November 3: A coup attempt occurred in the Maldives.
- November 6: Soviet scientist and well-known human rights activist Andrei Sakharov begins a two-week visit to the United States.
- November 15: The State of Palestine was formally established through the Palestinian Declaration of Independence.
- December 7: Gorbachev announces in a speech to the United Nations General Assembly that the Soviet Union will no longer militarily interfere with Eastern Europe.

=== 1989 ===
- January 4: Gulf of Sidra incident between America and Libya, similar to the 1981 Gulf of Sidra incident.
- January 7: Emperor Hirohito dies, marking the end of the Showa era in Japan.
- January 11: Communist Hungary introduces political reforms.
- January 19: The trade union Solidarity is legalized by the Polish government.
- January 20: George H. W. Bush is inaugurated as 41st President of the United States.
- February 2: Soviet troops withdraw from Afghanistan.
- February 3: Alfredo Stroessner was deposed in a coup led by Andrés Rodríguez.
- February 14: The Contra war effectively ends with the Tesoro Beach Accords happening in El Salvador with Costa Rica, El Salvador, Guatemala, Honduras and Nicaragua participating. An agreement is made that all contra forces are to disband in return for a free election to be held in February 1990. Although a few groups initially reject the agreement they eventually decide to participate.
- February 15: The Afghan Civil War begins after Soviet troops withdrawing from Afghanistan.
- February 19–21: Jakarta Informal Meeting II was held in Jakarta. This meeting succeeded in finding two important issues, namely the withdrawal of Vietnamese troops from Cambodia and the prevention of the return of the Pol Pot regime in Cambodia. Later, efforts to resolve the conflict will continue in International Conference in Paris on July 30–31, 1989.
- March 26: The Soviet Union holds the first round of legislative elections to the Congress of People's Deputies.
- June 3: Ayatollah Khomeini dies.
- June 4: Tiananmen Square Massacre: Beijing protests are crushed by the communist Chinese government, resulting in an unknown number of deaths.
- June 4: Elections in Poland show complete lack of backing for the Communist Party; Solidarity trade union wins all available seats in the Parliament and 99% in the Senate.
- August 19: The opening of the border gate between Austria and Hungary at the Pan-European Picnic set in motion a chain reaction, at the end of which there was no longer a GDR and the Eastern Bloc had disintegrated.
- August 23: Baltic Way: independence protesters in Estonia, Latvia and Lithuania set up a human chain across the three Baltic states, from Tallinn to Vilnius via Riga.
- August: Parliament in Poland elects Tadeusz Mazowiecki as leader of the first non-communist government in the Eastern Bloc.
- October 7: Hungarian Socialist Workers' Party, the ruling party of Hungary, is dissolved.
- October 18: The Hungarian constitution is amended to allow a multi-party political system and elections. In East Germany, the nearly 20-year term of communist leader Erich Honecker comes to an end.
- November 7: Civil unrest occurred in Moldova.
- November 9: Revolutions of 1989: Soviet reforms have allowed Eastern Europe to change the Communist governments there. The Berlin Wall is breached when Politburo spokesman, Günter Schabowski, not fully informed of the technicalities or procedures of the newly agreed lifting of travel restrictions, mistakenly announces at a news conference in East Berlin that the borders have been opened.
- November 10: Todor Zhivkov, the Communist leader of Bulgaria, is removed from office after 35 years in power.
- November 17–28: The Velvet Revolution brought the end of the authoritarian one-party rule in Czechoslovakia.
- December 2: End of the Second Malayan Emergency with the Peace Agreement of Hat Yai 1989.
- December 3: At the end of the Malta Summit, Soviet leader Mikhail Gorbachev and US President George H. W. Bush declare that a long-lasting era of peace has begun. Many observers regard this summit as the official beginning of the end of the Cold War.
- December 10: The Mongolian Revolution begins when Mongolians held peaceful demonstrations to end the one-party rule in the country.
- December 14: Democracy is restored in Chile.
- December 16–25: Rioters during the Romanian Revolution overthrow the Communist government of Nicolae Ceauşescu, executing him and his wife, Elena. Romania was the only Eastern Bloc country to violently overthrow its Communist government or to execute its leaders.
- December 20: The United States initiates Operation Just Cause.
- December 24: The First Liberian Civil War begins.
- December 25: The Romanian Communist Party, the former ruling party of Romania, is dissolved.
- December 29: Václav Havel becomes President of the now free Czechoslovakia.

== 1990s ==
=== 1990 ===
- January 19–20: Soviet troops kill at least 131 Azerbaijanis for demonstrating for independence in Baku.
- January 30: the Polish United Workers' Party is dissolved, allowing democracy to be restored in Poland.
- January 31: U.S. Operation Just Cause ends, and Operation Promote Liberty begins in Panama.
- February 12–14: The Dushanbe riots occurred in Tajikistan.
- March 11: Lithuania declares independence from the Soviet Union.
- March 21: South Africa give de jure independence to South West Africa (Namibia).
- April 3: The Bulgarian Communist Party, the ruling party of Bulgaria, is dissolved.
- May 22: Both North Yemen and South Yemen unified.
- May 29: Boris Yeltsin is elected as the president of Russia. Yeltsin would serve as Russia's president until resigning on December 31, 1999, with Vladimir Putin taking over.
- May 30: The Washington Summit begins.
- June 12: Russia issues the Declaration of Sovereignty but never officially declares its independence from the Soviet Union. With the declaration, it declares that the laws and constitution of the Russian Soviet Federated Socialist Republic (RSFSR) to be above those of the Soviet Union. The loss of the RSFSR which was the most powerful of all the Soviet republics is a major blow to the Soviet Union.
- August 2: Ba'athist Iraq invades Kuwait, igniting the Gulf War.
- August 20: Estonia declares independence from the Soviet Union.
- August 23: Armenia declares independence from the Soviet Union.
- September 9: George H. W. Bush and Mikhail Gorbachev meet in Helsinki, Finland and issue a joint declaration condemning the invasion of Kuwait.
- October 1: The Rwandan Civil War begins, between the RPF and the Rwandan government.
- October 3: Germany is reunified.
- October 4: The Mozambican Civil War ends with the defeat of the anti-communist RENAMO, allowing the ruling Marxist party, FRELIMO, to remain in power.
- October 15: Mikhail Gorbachev is awarded the Nobel Peace Prize.
- October 25: The Kazakhstan Soviet Socialist Republic issues a declaration on state sovereignty which gives republic's operations precedence over all others. It is later renamed the following year on December 10, 1991, to the Republic of Kazakhstan.
- November 2: The Transnistria War begins in Moldova.
- November 21: The Paris Charter is ratified by the Organization for Security and Co-operation in Europe.
- December 23: Slovenia holds an independence referendum with a majority voting in favor.

=== 1991 ===
- January 5: The First South Ossetia War begins.
- January 26: Siad Barre was ousted from office, ending the Somali Democratic Republic and beginning the Somali Civil War.
- February 9: Lithuania holds an independence referendum with a majority voting in favor.
- February 28: Gulf War ends.
- March 1: Post-Gulf War uprisings in Iraq occurred.
- March 3: Estonia and Latvia hold an independence referendum with a majority voting to restore independence.
- March 23: The Sierra Leone Civil War begins.
- March 31: Georgia holds an independence referendum with a majority voting for independence from the Soviet Union but is boycotted by most Abkhazians and South Ossetians. The Croatian War of Independence begins, marking the breakup of Yugoslavia.
- April 9: Georgia declares independence from the Soviet Union.
- May 19: Croatia holds an independence referendum with a majority voting in favor of independence.
- May 21: Rajiv Gandhi was assassinated.
- June 12: Party of Labour of Albania, the ruling party of Albania, is dissolved.
- June 27: Slovenia fought a ten day war against Yugoslavia, marking the beginning of the breakup of Yugoslavia.
- July 1: Warsaw Pact is dissolved.
- July 31: The START I Treaty is ratified.
- August 19: Soviet coup attempt of 1991. A coup occurs in response to a new union treaty to be signed on August 20.
- August 22: The coup is ended.
- August 24: Ukrainian Soviet Socialist Republic declares its independence from the Soviet Union renaming itself Ukraine that day as well. An official independence referendum happens later in December
- August 25: Belarus declares independence from the Soviet Union.
- August 27: Moldova declares independence from the Soviet Union.
- August 31: Uzbekistan and Kyrgyzstan declare independence from the Soviet Union.
- September: 1991 Zaire unrest occurred.
- September 7: Macedonia holds an independence referendum with a majority voting in favor of independence.
- September 9: Tajikistan declares independence from the Soviet Union.
- September 21: Armenia holds an independence referendum with a majority voting for independence from the Soviet Union despite declaring independence in August 1990.
- October 26: Turkmenistan holds an independence referendum with a majority voting for independence from the Soviet Union.
- October 27: Turkmenistan declares its independence from the Soviet Union.
- October 31: The Djiboutian Civil War begins.
- November 1: Chechnya declares sovereignty.
- November 12: The Indonesian Army massacred at least 250 East Timorese pro-independence protesters during the Indonesian occupation of East Timor.
- December 1: Ukraine holds an independence referendum with a majority voting in favor of independence.
- December 16: Kazakhstan declares its full independence from the Soviet Union.
- December 22: The Georgian Civil War begins.
- December 25: Mikhail Gorbachev resigns as President of the USSR. The flag of the Soviet Union is lowered for the last time over the Kremlin and is later replaced by the Russian flag. Also that day U.S. President George H. W. Bush, after receiving a phone call from Boris Yeltsin, delivers a Christmas Day speech acknowledging the end of the Cold War.
- December 26: The Council of the Republics of the Supreme Soviet of the USSR dissolves the Soviet Union. The United States became the world's only superpower.

== See also ==
- Cold War
- List of proxy wars
- Origins of the Cold War
