= 2021 in Saint Lucia =

- Decades: 2000s; 2010s; 2020s
- See also: Other events of 2021; Timeline of Saint Lucian history

Events from the year 2021 in Saint Lucia

== Incumbents ==
- Monarch: Elizabeth II
- Governor-General: Neville Cenac (until 31 October); Errol Charles onwards
- Prime Minister: Allen Chastanet (until 28 July); Philip J. Pierre onwards

== Events ==
Ongoing — COVID-19 pandemic in Saint Lucia

- 4 July – Tropical Storm Elsa passes through the Caribbean, downing trees and blowing off roofs, killing two people in the Dominican Republic and one in Saint Lucia.
- 26 July – 2021 Saint Lucian general election: The opposition Saint Lucia Labour Party, which won 13 of the 17 seats in the House, while the ruling United Workers Party lost nine of its eleven seats.
- 28 July – Philip J. Pierre is sworn in as the new Prime Minister.
