= 2020 in Saint Lucia =

- Decades: 2000s; 2010s; 2020s
- See also: Other events of 2020; Timeline of Saint Lucian history

Events from the year 2020 in Saint Lucia

== Incumbents ==
- Monarch: Elizabeth II
- Governor-General: Sir Neville Cenac
- Prime Minister: Allen Chastanet

== Events ==
Ongoing — COVID-19 pandemic in Saint Lucia

- 13 March – The country's first confirmed case of COVID-19 is detected in a 63-year-old woman with travel history to the United Kingdom.
- 23 March – The government declares a state of emergency due to the COVID-19 pandemic.

== Sports ==
- Saint Lucia at the 2020 Summer Olympics – Due to the ongoing COVID-19 pandemic, the event was postponed until 23 July.
