= 2018 in Saint Lucia =

- Decades: 1990s; 2000s; 2010s; 2020s
- See also: Other events of 2018; Timeline of Saint Lucian history

Events from the year 2018 in Saint Lucia

== Incumbents ==
- Monarch: Elizabeth II
- Governor-General: Neville Cenac
- Prime Minister: Allen Chastanet

== Events ==
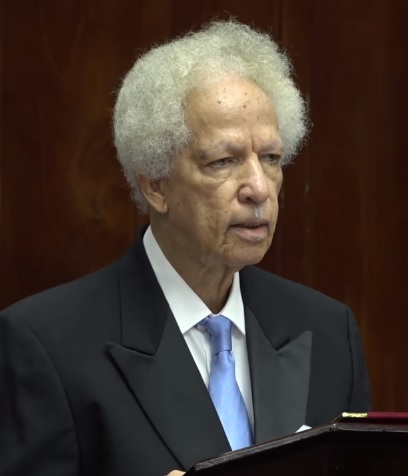
Neville Cenac, new Governor-General

- 12 January – Neville Cenac was appointed Governor-General of Saint Lucia

== Deaths ==
- 29 July – Arsene James, politician, Minister of Education and Culture 2006–2011 (b. 1944).
