= 2023 in Saint Lucia =

- Decades: 2000s; 2010s; 2020s
- See also: Other events of 2023; Timeline of Saint Lucian history

Events from the year 2023 in Saint Lucia

== Incumbents ==
- Monarch: Charles III
- Governor-General: Errol Charles
- Prime Minister: Philip J. Pierre

== Events ==
Ongoing — COVID-19 pandemic in Saint Lucia

- 6 May – Acting Governor-General Errol Charles attended the coronation of Charles III and Camilla.
