= 2017 in Saint Lucia =

- Decades: 1990s; 2000s; 2010s; 2020s
- See also: Other events of 2017; Timeline of Saint Lucian history

Events from the year 2017 in Saint Lucia

== Incumbents ==
- Monarc: Elizabeth II
- Governor-General: Pearlette Louisy
- Prime Minister: Allen Chastanet

== Events ==
- Saint Lucia hit their all time tourism record

== Deaths ==
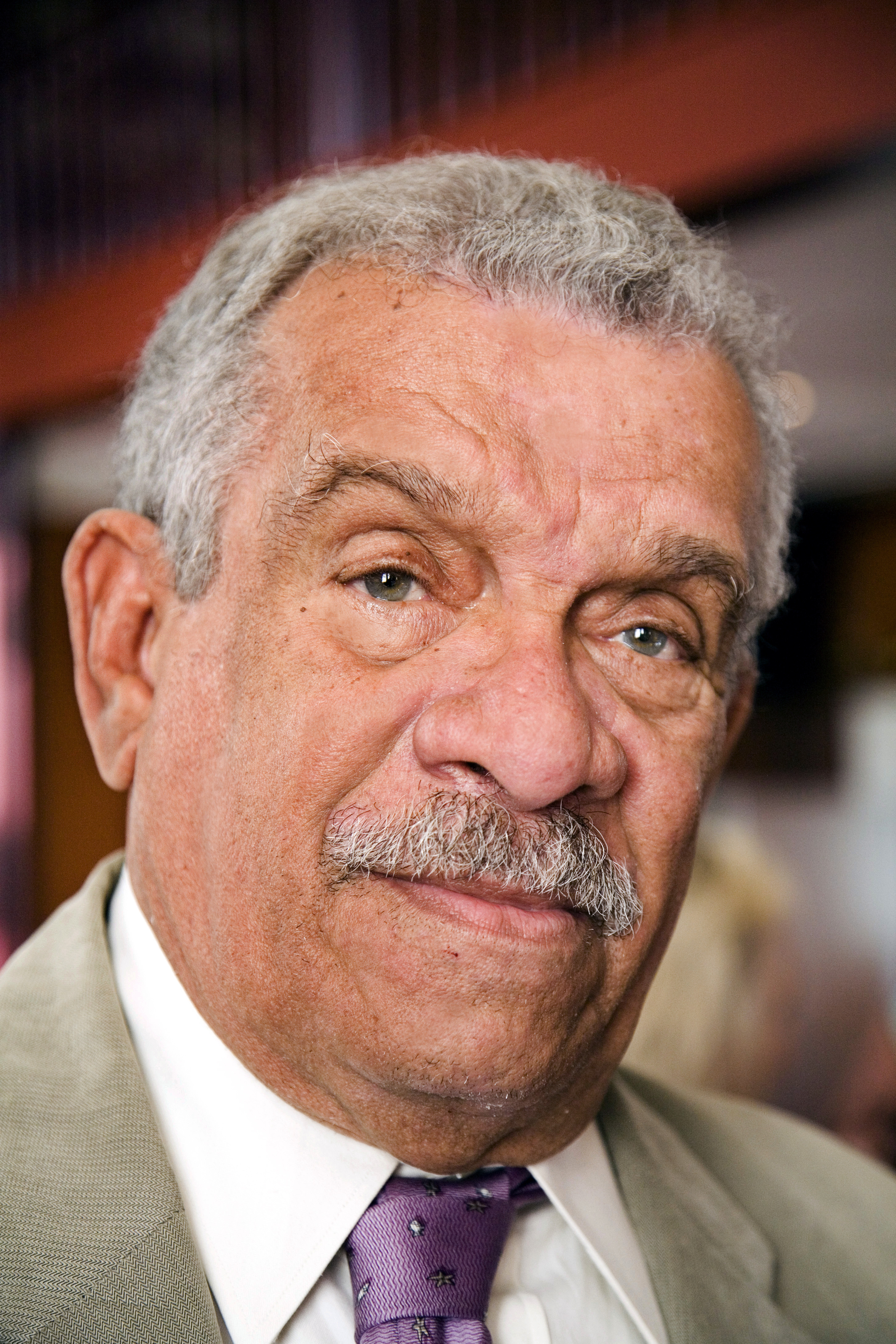
Derek Walcott received the 1992 Nobel Prize in Literature

- 17 March – Derek Walcott, poet and playwright, Nobel laureate (b. 1930).
