= 2024 in Saint Lucia =

- Decades: 2000s; 2010s; 2020s
- See also: Other events of 2024; Timeline of Saint Lucian history

Events from the year 2024 in Saint Lucia

== Incumbents ==
- Monarch: Charles III
- Governor-General: Errol Charles
- Prime Minister: Philip J. Pierre

== Events ==
- July 26–August 11 – Saint Lucia at the 2024 Summer Olympics: Julien Alfred clinches Saint Lucia's first ever Olympic medal after winning gold in the 100-metre dash on 3 August.

== Holidays ==
- 1 January - New Year's Day
- 12 February – Carnival
- 22 February – Independence Day
- 29 March – Good Friday
- 1 April - Easter Monday
- 1 May - May Day
- 20 May - Whit Monday
- 30 May - Corpus Christi
- 1 August - Emancipation Day
- 27 September- Julien Alfred Day
- 7 October - Thanksgiving
- 13 December – National day
- 25 December – Christmas Day
- 26 December – Boxing Day

== See also ==
- 2020s
- 2024 Atlantic hurricane season
