= Desmond Brathwaite =

Saint Lucian politician (died 2022)

Desmond Braithwaite

Member of Parliament for Castries South
- In office 1987–1997
- Preceded by: George Odlum
- Succeeded by: George Odlum

Minister for Sport

Personal details
- Died: 10 April 2022 Coubaril, Castries, Saint Lucia
- Party: United Workers Party

Desmond Brathwaite (died 10 April 2022) was a Saint Lucian politician who was Minister for Sport and who represented Castries South Constituency in the Saint Lucia House of Assembly from 1987 to 1997 for the United Workers Party.
