= 2025 in Saint Lucia =

- Decades: 2000s; 2010s; 2020s
- See also: Other events of 2025; Timeline of Saint Lucian history

Events from the year 2025 in Saint Lucia

== Incumbents ==
- Monarch: Charles III
- Governor-General: Errol Charles
- Prime Minister: Philip J. Pierre

== Events ==
- April 2 – The Ministry of Health Launches a Seniors Exercise Programme.
- April 10 – The World Bank's Board of Executive Directors approve a new project for Saint Lucia to help Saint Lucia enhance its capacity to prepare and respond to natural hazards and health-related crises.
- July 29 – The Eastern Caribbean Supreme Court strikes down a colonial-era law that criminalizes gay sex as unconstitutional.
- 2 December – 2025 Saint Lucian general election: Incumbent prime minister Philip J. Pierre wins a second term in office while his party, the Saint Lucia Labor Party, wins 14 of the 15 seats in the House of Assembly against the opposition United Workers Party.

== Holidays ==
- 1 January – New Year's Day
- 22 February – Independence Day
- 18 April – Good Friday
- 21 April – Easter Monday
- 1 May – May Day
- 9 June – Whit Monday
- 19 June – Corpus Christi
- 1 August – Emancipation Day
- 6 October – Thanksgiving
- 13 December – National day
- 25 December – Christmas Day
- 26 December – Boxing Day

== See also ==
- 2020s
- 2025 Atlantic hurricane season
