= Operation FOOT =

Major British counter-espionage operation

Operation FOOT was the expulsion of 105 Soviet diplomats and trade officials from Great Britain carried out by Prime Minister of the United Kingdom Edward Heath in September 1971 as part of the ongoing Cold War. It was "the largest expulsion of intelligence officials by any government in history." It took place as "a British response to the general Soviet plan to advance terrorist activities in the West."

Though Britain had engaged in "tit-for-tat" expulsions previously, the expulsion of 105 diplomats was "unprecedented" and "sent shock waves through not just the Kremlin, but through the international community as a whole." Because of this, the expulsion itself received widespread coverage by British news sources.

Operation Foot "marked the major turning point in Cold War counter-espionage operations in Britain" and "made Britain a hard espionage target for Soviet intelligence for the first time."
