= COVID-19 pandemic in Saint Lucia =

Ongoing COVID-19 viral pandemic in Saint Lucia

- Disease: COVID-19
- Pathogen: SARS-CoV-2
- Location: Saint Lucia
- First outbreak: Wuhan, Hubei, China
- Arrival date: 13 March 2020 (6 years, 5 months, 1 week and 2 days)
- Confirmed cases: 28,894 (2 September)
- Active cases: 127 (2 September)
- Recovered: 28,369 (2 September)
- Deaths: 391 (2 September)
- Fatality rate: 1.35% (2 September)
- Vaccinations: 59,973 (people with at least one dose); 54,780 (fully vaccinated); 7,799 (booster doses administered); (2 September)

Government website
- covid19response.lc

The COVID-19 pandemic in Saint Lucia was a part of the ongoing global viral pandemic of coronavirus disease 2019 (COVID-19), which was confirmed to have reached Saint Lucia on 13 March 2020. As of 2 September 2022, there are a total of 28,894 confirmed cases, of which 28,369 have recovered and 391 deaths have occurred.

The Ministry of Health and Wellness has conducted a vaccination programme using the Oxford–AstraZeneca COVID-19 vaccine since 17 February 2021, the Pfizer–BioNTech vaccine since 23 August, the Janssen COVID-19 vaccine since 9 December, the Moderna vaccine since March 2022. As of 5 May 2022, 29.4% of the population was fully vaccinated.

== Background ==
On 12 January 2020, the World Health Organization (WHO) confirmed that a novel coronavirus was the cause of a respiratory illness in a cluster of people in Wuhan City, Hubei Province, China, which was reported to the WHO on 31 December 2019.

The case fatality ratio for COVID-19 has been much lower than SARS of 2003, but the transmission has been significantly greater, with a significant total death toll.

== Timeline ==
Cases

Deaths

=== 2020 ===
==== March 2020 ====
On 13 March, the first case in Saint Lucia was confirmed. The patient was a 63-year-old woman with a travel history from the United Kingdom. The Department of Health and Wellness confirmed a second case on 14 March. The patients were repatriated to the United Kingdom on 24 and 25 March.

On 20 March, Prime Minister Allen Chastanet announced that Saint Lucia would implement social distancing measures, including the suspension of nonessential commercial activity from 23 March through 5 April. The government also imposed an 11 p.m. to 5 a.m. curfew. On 29 March, the Prime Minister extended the shutdown to 14 April and extended the curfew to 8 p.m. to 5 a.m.

On 23 March, the Government of Saint Lucia declared a state of emergency and announced the closure of the country's airports to incoming passenger flights until 5 April.

On 27 March, the Ministry of Health began local testing for COVID-19 and, on 29 March, it reported the first instance of local transmission among six new confirmed cases. The ministry also reported that 300 persons were under supervised quarantine.

On 29 March, the government banned the sale of alcoholic beverages, as well as suspending all liquor licenses, and closing all bars.

On 31 March, the Prime Minister announced a 24-hour curfew confining all persons to their place of residence from 5 a.m. 1 April to 5 a.m. 7 April. At the time of the announcement, persons were already under curfew meaning they could not make any arrangements for the new curfew.

==== April 2020 ====
On 1 April 2020, the Prime Minister announced that mini-marts and bakeries would be open for a limited time to allow people to buy goods. On 2 April, St. Lucians queued up in long lines outside the briefly opened shops, mostly ignoring the prime minister's calls to practice social distancing.

On 5 April, the Prime Minister announced that St. Lucia would revert to a 10-hour 7 p.m. to 5 a.m. curfew from 7 April through 13 April. Essential businesses would be allowed to operate from 7 a.m. to 4 p.m., except during the Good Friday, Easter, and Easter Monday holidays.

On 5 April, the Queen of Saint Lucia addressed the Commonwealth in a televised broadcast, in which she asked people to "take comfort that while we may have more still to endure, better days will return". She added, "we will be with our friends again; we will be with our families again; we will meet again".

On 8 April, a social stabilization program was announced for people who had become unemployed as a result of the coronavirus pandemic, or who were vulnerable, and an economic support package for businesses.
Sarah Flood Beaubrun, Minister for External Affairs, announced that they were working with the United States and Canada to return Saint Lucians stranded abroad.

On 12 April, the government extended the 10-hour 7 p.m. to 5 a.m. curfew and partial commercial shutdown through 26 April. The government added hardware and home supply stores to the list of businesses permitted to operate, to allow preparation for the drought and hurricane season.

On 21 April, the first home nationals had been repatriated. The repatriants were eight employees of Norwegian Cruise Line who had been anchored on the coast of Barbados since 9 April.

On 22 April, Chief Medical Officer Dr. Sharon Belmar-George announced that all 15 of the country's confirmed cases had recovered, including those at high risk because of their age or preexisting conditions. All measures including the curfew would remain in effect, and Belmar-George warned against a resurgence in the future. Prime Minister Chastanet was asked about lifting the alcohol restriction. Chastanet would look in it, but wanted to follow the advice by the Chief Medical Officer. On 30 April, Chastenet announced that the alcohol ban will not be lifted.
The Cabinet of Saint Lucia agreed to cut their salary by 75% due to the economic crisis caused by the COVID-19 pandemic and the loss of income from tourism. The government announced they would meet on 28 April to deal with the loss of revenue.

On 24 April, the Ministry of Health announced: "Though this 100 percent recovery rate provides us with a milestone worth recognizing, we at the Ministry of Health continue to caution the public that any gains attained should not be understood as a reason to let down our guard or to throw caution to the wind." Between 21 and 24 April, 60 tests had been performed, all being negative.

On 28 April, there were 17 confirmed cases, of which 15 had recovered. The two new cases were a 54-year mother who had been isolating since 4 March and her 20-year-old son.

On 30 April, the World Bank announced it would provide US$10.5 million to Saint Lucia for their COVID-19 response.

==== May 2020 ====
On 2 May 2020, the Saint Lucia Diaspora Affairs Unit reported that 29 Saint Lucians abroad had died from COVID-19, with 22 in the United States, six in the United Kingdom, and one in Switzerland.

On 8 May, the government partially lifted the ban on the sale of alcohol, allowing it in stores.

On 18 May, the Ministry of Commerce permitted businesses to resume full operations during normal business hours. Curfew hours were changed as well to 9 p.m. to 5 a.m. Schools and cinemas remained closed and mass crowd events were still prohibited.

On 19 May, Tourism Minister Dominic Fedee announced a phased reopening of Saint Lucia's tourism industry, starting with the reopening of borders to international flights starting 4 June 2020.

==== June 2020 ====
On 5 June 2020, a 19th case was announced, a 33-year-old female cruise worker who was among the repatriated people.

On 12 June, it was announced that starting 15 June, as part of government's phased re-opening, the curfew would be adjusted from beginning at 9 pm to beginning at 12 am through 5 am; social gatherings would be allowed and those with licenses would be allowed to sell liquor.

==== July 2020 ====
The travel bubble included Antigua and Barbuda, Aruba, Anguilla, The Bahamas, Barbados, Bermuda, Bonaire, British Virgin Islands, Curaçao, Dominica, Grenada, Guyana, Jamaica, Montserrat, Saint Barthélemy, Saint Kitts and Nevis, Saint Martin, Saint Vincent and the Grenadines, Trinidad and Tobago, and Turks and Caicos Islands.

On 6 July, the Prime Minister announced that the nightly curfew will be lifted on 10 July. He also announced the reopening of cinemas, early childhood development centers, and sporting events, subject to protocols.

On 22 July a 24th case was announced, a 59-year-old female who had returned to St Lucia on 10 July. On 30 July, a 25th case was announced, that of an 86-year-old male. At the time 3 Covid patients remained hospitalized.

==== August 2020 ====
On 11 August 2020, the Ministry of Health and Wellness announced the country had achieved a 100 percent recovery rate from COVID-19, with no new cases reported from the testing of 99 individuals. A total of 4,373 tests have been taken.

On 17 August, the Ministry of Health and Wellness announced the country has one new case of COVID-19, A total of 4,801 tests have taken.

==== September 2020 ====
On 1 September 2020, the Ministry of Health and Wellness announced that the last remaining COVID-19 patient has recovered.

On 1 September, the St. Lucia Tourism Authority announced the easing of restrictions for visitors. Visitors are allowed to stay at up to two of the COVID-19 certified hotels and resorts on the island and may enjoy water-based activities. Returning nationals and residents will be required to undergo a 14-day quarantine.

On 7 September, most primary and secondary schools reopened.

==== October 2020 ====
On 10 October 2020, a minibus driver on the Castries to Vieux Fort route tested positive as St. Lucia's 29th confirmed case of COVID-19. Officials stated concerns about community spread. The Royal Saint Lucian Police Force (RSLPF) announced zero tolerance enforcement of COVID-19 protocols starting 12 October. As of 13 October, the Ministry of Health had reviewed 500 persons in contact with the driver, conducted 283 tests and placed 50 persons into quarantine in relation to this case.

On 14 October, face masks became mandatory in all public spaces. Previously, they were only mandatory for tourists in "quarantine bubbles" and for workers while in contact with such tourists. Children aged five and under were exempt.

On 16 October, the Ministry of Education closed all schools for one week and Castries Comprehensive Secondary School for two weeks, after a student at CCSS tested positive for COVID-19. Later on 16 October, a worker at the secondary school also tested positive.

On 22 October, the Ministry of Health and Wellness announced three new confirmed cases of COVID-19, bringing total confirmed cases to 42 and active cases to 15. Chief Medical Officer Sharon Belmar-George stated that new cases found in a variety of communities indicate the presence of community spread. In response, the Ministry of Education ordered schools to remain closed for an additional two weeks, with reopening scheduled Monday, 9 November.

On 30 October, the government announced enhanced protocols to contain the spread of COVID-19. Persons are advised to work from home where possible. Mass crowd events are limited 25 persons per venue, reduced from 50. Businesses are ordered to cease commercial activity at 9 p.m. unless exempted. On-premises alcohol consumption is prohibited, with grab and go sales permitted. Restaurants and bars must close at 9 p.m. The government also announced a voluntary limitation on movement, encouraging persons to stay home from 9 p.m. to 5 a.m. The Prime Minister also announced upcoming border control measures to deter illegal entry.

==== November 2020 ====
On 10 November 2020, Prime Minister Chastanet announced the first COVID-19 death in Saint Lucia. The Ministry of Health confirmed the second death later that day.

On 13 November, Prime Minister Chastanet announced new COVID-19 protocols that suspend all social gatherings starting 16 November. Church services and funerals will be limited to 25 persons. Businesses must close at 9 p.m. Alcohol sales are limited to grab and go while bars must close at 4 p.m. All sporting events are also suspended. Including public gyms.

Starting on 14 November, the RSLPF hired 200 wardens to enforce compliance with COVID-19 protocols in communities with the power of arrest. Their training commenced on 30 November.

==== December 2020 ====
On 3 December 2020, Chief Medical Officer Sharon Belmar-George stated that the COVID-19 vaccines may be available in St. Lucia by the first quarter of 2021, anticipating 3% available by June 2021 and 20% available by December 2021.

On 7 December and 8 December, minibus drivers, led by the Southern Minibus Drivers Association, waged a strike action on several minibus routes to protest COVID-19 limits on passenger capacity. Stating that COVID-19 restrictions were causing substantial losses, they demanded removal of the current limit of 10 passengers per bus or some other form of compensation.

On 9 December, the National Emergency Management Advisory Committee (NEMAC) announced revised COVID-19 protocols for the holiday season from 15 December through 11 January. Business operating hours will be extended. Social gatherings of up to 25 persons will be permitted. Schools are to remain closed for in-person instruction with limited exceptions. Christmas parties of any kind will be prohibited. At the same time, Chief Medical Officer Belmar-George announced that St. Lucia has turned down the curve on COVID-19 transmission, but she also noted that the Christmas season presents a period of high risk.

On 18 December, the Ministry of Education announced that it will reopen schools on 4 January 2021, with students returning to class on 11 January.

=== 2021 ===
==== January 2021 ====
On 31 January 2021, eight inmates and one staff member at the Bordelais Correctional Facility tested positive for COVID-19, with one inmate dying on 4 February. Inmates began protest actions, citing the prison's COVID response among other grievances. The outbreak would result in over 100 cases by the end of February.

==== February 2021 ====
On 5 February 2021, restrictions on arrivals were tightened. The pre arrival testing window was shortened from seven days to five days.

On 17 February 2021, Saint Lucia began its vaccination programme in phases, the first phase administering the Oxford–AstraZeneca COVID-19 vaccine to health care workers, first responders and other front-line workers. The second phase began in March 2021, vaccinating persons at high risk, including the elderly, with mass vaccinations starting in the second half of that month and continuing into April.

==== March — July 2021 ====
On 1 March 2021, the Government of Saint Lucia received 25,000 doses of the Oxford–AstraZeneca COVID-19 vaccine, donated by the Republic of India.

On the week of 4 May 2021, the Ministry of Health began administering vaccine first doses to the general public aged 18 years and older.

On 29 June 2021, the cruise ship Celebrity Millennium arrived with 417 passengers, as the first return in the phased reopening of cruise travel sector.

The Ministry of Health marks 25 July 2021 as the start of the fourth wave of COVID-19, which continues as of September 2021. Officials blame mass gatherings for the increase in cases.

==== August 2021 ====
On 13 August 2021, the Ministry of Health reported that it confirmed the presence of the delta variant in Saint Lucia for the first time, with three persons infected.

On 17 August, the Government of Saint Lucia received 52,650 doses of the Pfizer–BioNTech vaccine, donated by the United States.

On 23 August, the Ministry of Health began offering to Pfizer vaccine to persons aged 12 years and older.

On 27 August, the government announced adjusted COVID-19 protocols, effective from 28 August through 7 September, with earlier business closing times, longer curfew hours and an all-day curfew on Sunday, 5 September. The Ministry of Education announced that it will postpone the reopening of school in September and that schools would use the Distributed Learning Approach instead of face-to-face instruction.

== Preventive measures ==
- All schools were closed on 16 March 2020. Schools reopened for online instruction on 20 April. In-class instruction resumed for Grade 6 and Form 5 students on 3 June to prepare them for examinations. Schools reopened for in-class instruction on 7 September. Schools closed again on 16 October. As of December 2020, schools are scheduled to reopen for in-class instruction on 11 January 2021.
- Non-essential businesses were closed from 23 March through 17 May.
- Curfew between 23:00 and 05:00. Changed to 19:00 to 05:00 on 5 April and changed to 21:00 to 05:00 on 18 May.
- Bars are closed, and restaurants are limited to take-out and drive-through service only. Alcohol sales were prohibited from 29 March until 8 May.
- Air and sea ports were closed from 23 March through 3 June, except for cargo shipments and outgoing flights to repatriate foreign nationals.
- Limited reopening of minimarts and bakeries. Home supplies and hardware stores reopened. Construction will be allowed under conditions, reopening of fabric stores.

== Vaccination programme ==
The Ministry of Health and Wellness began its vaccination program on 17 February 2021, using Oxford–AstraZeneca COVID-19 vaccine obtained through the COVAX programme purchases and donations from the Republic of India. The programme started in phases. Doses in the first phase were given to health care workers, first responders and other front-line workers. In March, the second phase targeted persons at high risk, including the elderly, with mass vaccinations starting in last March and continuing through April. Vaccination of the general public begin the week of 3 May.

In August 2021, Saint Lucia received doses of the Pfizer–BioNTech COVID-19 vaccine, donated by the United States. The ministry applied the first doses of the Pfizer vaccine on 23 August, offering to persons aged 12 and older since August 2021.

== Statistics ==
Confirmed new cases per day

Confirmed deaths per day

Active cases per day

== See also ==
- COVID-19 pandemic in Barbados
- COVID-19 pandemic in Martinique
- COVID-19 pandemic in Saint Vincent and the Grenadines
- Caribbean Public Health Agency
- COVID-19 pandemic in North America
- COVID-19 pandemic by country and territory
