= List of political systems in France =

This is a chronological list of political systems in France, from Clovis (481 CE) to modern times. A series of different monarchies spanned 1300 years from the Early Middle Ages to the French Revolution in 1789. The Revolution was followed by five periods of republicanism alternating with periods of imperial monarchy and one bout with authoritarianism during the Second World War. The Fifth Republic began in 1958 and is the political system in France as of 2026.

== Introduction ==
A political system (French: système politique (Note: In French, the term système politique has broader scope than the English term, and includes political regime, economic structure, and organization of society).)), also known as a "form of government" (Note: "Form of government" : (French: forme de gouvernement) is a synonym of "political system". In French, the meaning differs slightly, and a synonym for forme de gouvernement in French is régime politique.) (Note: The term political regime exists in English, but has taken on negative connations.) is a way of organizing a state. Some different political systems are: democracy, totalitarianism, authoritarianism, theocracy, feudalism, monarchism, republicanism, and various hybrid systems. Each of these may be further subdivided, for example: absolute monarchy, constitutional monarchy, and feudal monarchy, all of which have been present in France. Many of these forms of government were known in Classical antiquity, and pre-date the existence of France.

Classical French historiography usually regards Clovis I (r. 509–511) as the first king of France, however historians today consider that such a kingdom didn't begin until the establishment of West Francia in 843. For the purposes of this article, all political systems from Clovis on are considered to be in scope.

== Historical context ==
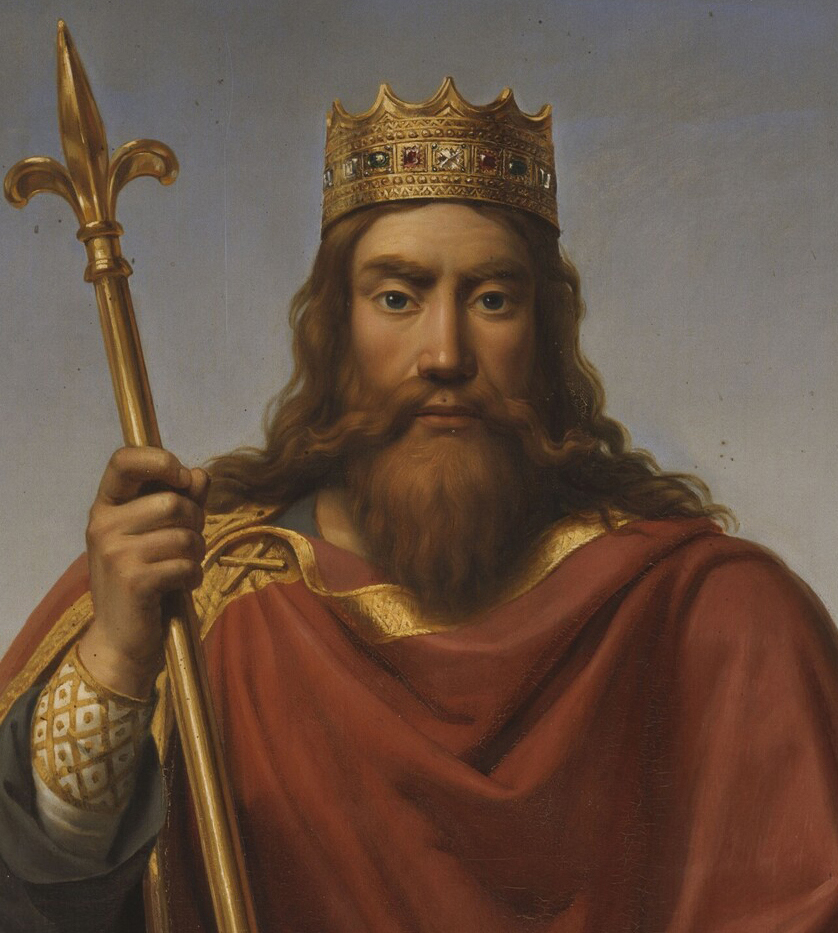
Clovis, King of the Franks

The Franks were a group of Romanized Germanic dynasties within the collapsing Western Roman Empire, who eventually commanded the region between the rivers Loire and Rhine. Clovis I established a single kingdom uniting the core Frankish territories, and was crowned King of the Franks in 496. He and his descendants ruled the Merovingian dynasty until 751, when it was replaced by the Carolingians (751-843).

West Francia c. 843, after the treaty of Verdun

After the coronation of Charlemagne in 800, the Carolingian Empire (800–888) gradually came to be seen in the West as a continuation of the ancient Roman Empire. After the Treaty of Verdun in 843, the Kingdom of the Franks ("Francia") was divided into three separate kingdoms, merging into two: West Francia and East Francia. The latter became the Holy Roman Empire, and West Francia eventually became the core of the Kingdom of France, which was structured as a feudal monarchy and lasted for eight centuries (987–1792).

During the French Revolution, the last pre-revolutionary monarch, Louis XVI, was forced to accept the French Constitution of 1791, thus turning the absolute monarchy into a constitutional monarchy. This lasted a year, before the monarchy was abolished entirely in September 1792 and replaced by the French First Republic, marking the beginning of republicanism in France.

For roughly the next eighty years, there was an alternating series of empires, republics, and a kingdom, until the 1870 establishment of the Third Republic. From that point on, it was republics down to the present day, with the exception of the authoritarian Vichy regime during World War II. The Fifth Republic, established as a semi-presidential system in 1958, remains the political system in France as of now.

== List ==
Name	Date	Type	constitution	Parliament		Form of government		
Name	Date	Type	constitution	Lower house	Upper house	Form of government		
Federal monarchy	481 (Note: Upon the death of Childeric I, his son, Clovis I became king of the Franks, which was a federative monarchy.) to 1 Jun 987 (Note: Hugues Capet was elected king and founded the Capetian dynasty. The kingdom of the Franks became a feudal monarchy.)	Federal monarchy (481–987)	Fundamental laws (481–1575) then Fundamental laws (1575–1789)	Legislative power belonged to the king and not to the parlements, which were courts. The king could call an Estates General to solicit advice (the last was in 1789).		Ancien Régime (481–1791)	Royal Council : Council of State (13th c.–1790) separate from the Conseil des affaires (later, Conseil d'en haut) (16th c.–1792)	Kingdom of France (481–1792)
Feudal monarchy	1 Jun 987–14 May 1610 (Note: Assassination of Henri IV. End of the Renaissance, beginning of the absolute monarchy.)	Feudal monarchy (987–1610)	Fundamental laws (481–1575) then Fundamental laws (1575–1789)	Legislative power belonged to the king and not to the parlements, which were courts. The king could call an Estates General to solicit advice (the last was in 1789).		Ancien Régime (481–1791)	Royal Council : Council of State (13th c.–1790) separate from the Conseil des affaires (later, Conseil d'en haut) (16th c.–1792)	Kingdom of France (481–1792)
Absolutism	14 May 1610–14 Sep 1791 (Note: Louis XVI swore an oath to the constitution; beginning of constitutional monarchy in France.)	Absolutism (1610–1791)	Fundamental laws (481–1575) then Fundamental laws (1575–1789)	Legislative power belonged to the king and not to the parlements, which were courts. The king could call an Estates General to solicit advice (the last was in 1789).		Ancien Régime (481–1791)	Royal Council : Council of State (13th c.–1790) separate from the Conseil des affaires (later, Conseil d'en haut) (16th c.–1792)	Kingdom of France (481–1792)
Absolutism	14 May 1610–14 Sep 1791	Absolutism (1610–1791)	Articles of constitution of 1789	National Constituent Assembly (1789–1791)		Ancien Régime (481–1791)	Royal Council : Council of State (13th c.–1790) separate from the Conseil des affaires (later, Conseil d'en haut) (16th c.–1792)	Kingdom of France (481–1792)
Constitutional monarchy	14 Sep 1791–21 Sep 1792	Constitutional monarchy (1791–1792)	Constitution of 1791	Legislative Assembly (1791–1792)			Royal Council : Council of State (13th c.–1790) separate from the Conseil des affaires (later, Conseil d'en haut) (16th c.–1792)	Kingdom of France (481–1792)
Constitutional monarchy	14 Sep 1791–21 Sep 1792	Constitutional monarchy (1791–1792)	Constitution of 1791	Legislative Assembly (1791–1792)			Provisional Executive Council (Aug–Sep 1792)	Kingdom of France (481–1792)
First Republic	21 Sep 1792–18 May 1804	fr:Régime d'assemblée = ?? (1792–1795)	Constitution of 1793	National Convention (1792–1795)			Provisional Executive Council (1792–1794)	French republic (1792–1804)
First Republic	21 Sep 1792–18 May 1804	fr:Régime d'assemblée = ?? (1792–1795)	Constitution of 1793	National Convention (1792–1795)		General Defense Committee (Jan – Apr 1793)	Provisional Executive Council (1792–1794)	French republic (1792–1804)
First Republic	21 Sep 1792–18 May 1804	fr:Régime d'assemblée = ?? (1792–1795)	Constitution of 1793	National Convention (1792–1795)		Committee of Public Safety (1793–1795)	Commissioners of the CPS (1794–1795)	French republic (1792–1804)
First Republic	21 Sep 1792–18 May 1804	strict separation of powers (1795–1799)	Constitution of 1795	Council of Five Hundred (1795–1799)	Council of Ancients (1795–1799)	Directory (1795–1799)		French republic (1792–1804)
First Republic	21 Sep 1792–18 May 1804	Consulate (1799–1802)	Constitution of 1799	Legislative Body (1799–1814)	Conservative Senate (1799–1814)	Consulate Consular Commission; 11 Nov 1799–13 Dec 1799 Consulat; 13 Dec 1799–2 Aug 1802 First Consul; 2 Aug 1802–18 May 1804		French republic (1792–1804)
First Republic	21 Sep 1792–18 May 1804	Authoritarianism (1802–1804)	Constitution of 1802	Legislative Body (1799–1814)	Conservative Senate (1799–1814)	Consulate Consular Commission; 11 Nov 1799–13 Dec 1799 Consulat; 13 Dec 1799–2 Aug 1802 First Consul; 2 Aug 1802–18 May 1804		French republic (1792–1804)
First Empire	18 May 1804–4 Apr 1814	Imperial monarchy (1804–1814)	Constitution of 1804	Legislative Body (1799–1814)	Conservative Senate (1799–1814)	French Empire (1804–1814)		
First Restoration	6 Apr 1814–20 Mar 1815	Constitutional monarchy (1814–1815)	Charter of 1814	Chamber of Deputies (1814–1815)	Chamber of Peers (1814–1848)	Kingdom of France (1814–1815)		
Hundred Days	20 Mar 1815–7 Jul 1815	Imperial monarchy (Jun–Jul 1815)	Charter of 1815	Chamber of Representatives (Mar–Jul 1815)	Chamber of Peers (1814–1848)	French Empire (1815)		
Second Restoration	8 Jul 1815–2 Aug 1830	Constitutional monarchy (1815–1830)	restoration of the Charter of 1814	Chamber of Deputies (1815–1848)	Chamber of Peers (1814–1848)	Kingdom of France (1815–1848)		
July Monarchy	9 Aug 1830–24 Feb 1848	Constitutional monarchy (1830–1848)	Charter of 1830	Chamber of Deputies (1815–1848)	Chamber of Peers (1814–1848)	Kingdom of France (1815–1848)		
Second Republic	24 Feb 1848–2 Dec 1852	no type	no constitution	Constituent Assembly of 1848 (1848–1849)		French republic (1848–1852)		
Second Republic	24 Feb 1848–2 Dec 1852	Presidential system (1849–1852)	Constitution of 1848	Legislative Assembly (1849–1851)		French republic (1848–1852)		
Second Empire	2 Dec 1852–4 Sep 1870	Imperial monarchy (1852–1870)	Constitution of 1852 then sixteen amendments	Corps législatif (1852-1870)	Senate (1852-1870)	French Empire (1852–1870)		
Third Republic	4 Sep 1870–10 Jul 1940	Parliamentary republic (1871–1875)	no constitution from 1870 to 1874	National Assembly (1871) (1875-1942)		French republic (1870–present)		
Third Republic	4 Sep 1870–10 Jul 1940	Parliamentary system (1875–1940)	Constitutional Laws of 1875	National Assembly (3rd Rep.) (1875-1942): Chamber of Deputies (France) (1875-1942) / Senate (1875-1942)		French republic (1870–present)		
Free France	18 Jun 1940–3 Jun 1943	Resistance movement (1940–1943)	Brazzaville Manifesto	National Assembly (3rd Rep.) (1875-1942): Chamber of Deputies (France) (1875-1942) / Senate (1875-1942)		French republic (1870–present)	Vichy regime (Note: The French State was never recognized by the two provisional consultative assemblies of the French Committee of National Liberation and the Provisional Government of the French Republic.) (Unitary authoritarian dictatorship) (1940 (Note: Vote of full powers to Philippe Pétain on July 10, 1940. On July 11, 1940, Pétain became head of the French State (the official name of the Vichy regime) in Vichy. The power given to Pétain to write and promulgate a constitution was never fulfilled.)–1944); French Constitutional Law of 1940; Constitutional acts of the Vichy regime	
French Committee of National Liberation	3 Jun 1943–3 Jun 1944	Resistance movement (1940–1943)	Ordonnance from 17 Sep 1943	Provisional Consultative Assembly (1943–1945)		French republic (1870–present)	Vichy regime (Unitary authoritarian dictatorship) (1940–1944); French Constitutional Law of 1940; Constitutional acts of the Vichy regime	
Provisional Government of the French Republic	3 Jun 1944–27 Oct 1946	no type	Ordinance of 9 August 1944	Constituent Assembly of 1945 (1945–1946)		French republic (1870–present)	Sigmaringen enclave (1944–1945)	
Provisional Government of the French Republic	3 Jun 1944–27 Oct 1946	no type	Constitutional law of 2 November 1945	Constituent Assembly of 1946 (Jun–Nov 1946)		French republic (1870–present)		
Fourth Republic	27 Oct 1946–4 Oct 1958	Parliamentary system (1946–1958)	Constitution of 1946	National Assembly (1946-1958)	Council of the Republic (1946-1958)	French republic (1870–present)		
Fifth Republic	from 4 Oct 1958 to present (As of 2025)	Semi-presidential system (1958–present)	Constitution of 1958	Congress (1958–present): National Assembly (1958–present) / Senate (1958–present)		French republic (1870–present)		

== See also ==
- Constitutional Cabinet of Louis XVI
- Constitutionalism
- Constitution of France
- Constitutions of France
- Family tree of French monarchs (simplified)
- France in the long nineteenth century
- French Community
- French Constitutional Council
- French law
- French Union
- Government of France
- Liste des gouvernements de la France (in French)
- List of forms of government
- List of French legislatures
- List of French monarchs
- Politics of France
- Carolingian dynasty
- Clovis I
- Francia
- Franks#Carolingian empire (751–843)
- Franks#Merovingian kingdom (481–751)
- House of Bourbon
- House of Orléans
- House of Valois
- List of Frankish kings
- List of French monarchs
- Merovingian dynasty
- Popular monarchy
- Robertians

== Works cited ==
- Malvin, Christian; Société de l'Ecole des chartes (1996). "La baptême de Clovis : heurs et malheurs d'un mythe fondateur de la France contemporaine, 1814-1914". In Guyotjeannin, Olivier (ed.). Clovis chez les historiens [Clovis according to the historians] (in French). Librairie Droz. ISBN 9782600055925. OCLC 36533794.
- Sewell, Elizabeth Missing (1876). Popular History of France. Longman. OCLC 81375924.
