= List of constitutions of France =

The constitutions of France are the various foundational texts that have organized the institutions of France at different periods of its history. These may be known under various names – constitution, charter, constitutional laws or acts – and take precedence over other legislative texts. (Note: Precedence of constitutional texts over others may be viewed as the hierarchy of norms.)

The constitutional text currently in force in France is the constitution of 1958, which founded the Fifth Republic. It was approved by the people in a referendum on 28 September 1958, and officially promulgated on 4 October that year.

== History ==
The constitutional history of France is made up of many changes that have led to experimentation with a large number of political regime types since the French Revolution, ranging from an assembly regime (such as the National Convention) to reactionary dictatorship (such as the Vichy regime).

== Precursors ==
The Kingdom of France, under the Ancien Régime, was an absolute monarchy and lacked a formal constitution; the regime essentially relied on custom. That said, certain rules known as the fundamental laws of the Kingdom were outside the power of the monarch to change without further consent. These rules were mainly about the inheritance of the Crown, which required strict primogeniture unless the heir was not Catholic, and from the Treaty of Troyes onward was strictly agnatic (male-only) as well. The Parlement of Paris, a primarily judicial body with quasi-legislative functions that was tasked with applying the fundamental laws, rarely brooked modification of the laws. For instance, Louis XIV tried by his will and testament to change the inheritance order, but the Parlement annulled it. On the other hand, the law was occasionally changed, as when the provisions of the Peace of Utrecht renouncing the claim of Louis XIV's grandson Philippe to inherit the throne of France were approved to allow him to inherit the throne of Spain.

== List of constitutions ==
The Revolutionary Era saw a number of constitutions:

- Constitution of 1791, which established a parliamentary monarchy (3 September 1791).
- Constitution of the Year I, which was never implemented (21 June 1793).
- Constitution of the Year III, which instituted the Directory (5 Fructidor of Year III = 28 July 1795).
- Constitution of the Year VIII, which instituted the Consulate (22 Frimaire of the Year VIII = 13 December 1799).
- Constitution of the Year X, still during the Consulate (16 Thermidor of Year X = 2 August 1802).
- Constitution of the Year XII, which instituted the First Empire (28 Floréal of the year XII = 18 May 1804).

Following the restoration of the monarchy:

- Charter of 1814 of 4 June 1814 established the Bourbon Restoration.
- Charter of 1815 of 22 April 1815 (Hundred Days).
- Charter of 1830 of 14 August 1830 established the July Monarchy.

Mid-19th century:

- Constitution of 1848 adopted 4 November 1848, established the Second Republic.
- Constitution of 1852 adopted 14 January 1852, established the Second Empire.
- Constitutional Laws of 1875 of the Third Republic, 24 and 25 February, and 16 July 1875.

20th century:

- Constitutional Law of 1940 adopted 10 July 1940, established Vichy France.
- Constitutional law of 2 November 1945, organized the Provisional Government of the French Republic.
- Constitution of 27 October 1946, established the Fourth Republic.
- Constitution of 4 October 1958, established the Fifth Republic.

== Preamble ==
In France, the preamble to the constitution of the Fifth Republic of 1958 was considered ancillary and therefore non-binding until a major jurisprudential reversal by the Constitutional Council in a decision of 16 July 1971. This decision, which began with the words "Having regard to the constitution and its preamble," affected a considerable change of French constitutional law, as the preamble and the texts it referred to, the Declaration of the Rights of Man and of the Citizen of 1789 and the preamble to the constitution of the Fourth Republic, took their place alongside the constitution proper as texts understood as being invested with constitutional value. The Charter for the Environment was later appended to the preamble, and the Constitutional Council identified three informal categories consisting of the fundamental principles recognized by the laws of the Republic, the principles of constitutional value, and the objectives of constitutional value.

== See also ==
- Article 49 of the French Constitution
- Constitutionalism
- French Constitutional Council
- Constitutional economics
- Fifth Republic (France)
- Political system of France
- Politics of France
- Parliamentary immunity in France
- De Gaulle's 1946 Bayeux speech
