= National Constituent Assembly (France, 1945) =

Post-war legislature of France after World War 2

The French Constituent Assembly of 1945 (Assemblée constituante française de 1945), also referred to as the First National Constituent Assembly, was a Constituent assembly elected after the 1945 French legislative election to draft a draft Constitution to be approved by the French people via referendum. This referendum, held on May 5, 1946, resulted in the rejection of the proposal, prompting the organization of new elections for a Constituent Assembly of 1946.

== Context ==
After the Liberation of France in 1945, the provisional government led by Charles de Gaulle did not reinstate the 16th legislature of the French Third Republic. Instead, it organized legislative elections to establish a new Constituent Assembly, tasked with drafting a new constitution to ensure democratic representation and legitimacy in the institutions of a new Republic. On July 16, 1945, the provisional government presented a draft ordinance to the Provisional Consultative Assembly proposing a referendum. The Consultative Assembly opposed this plan due to its reliance on a referendum and the limited powers granted to the new Constituent assembly.

Despite opposition, the government issued an ordinance on August 17, 1945, organizing a referendum in October. As stipulated, the Provisional Consultative Assembly dissolved with the electoral process for the Constituent Assembly underway. Until the office of the President of the French Republic was reinstated, the head of the provisional government effectively acted as head of state.

== Referendum and elections of October 21, 1945 ==
On October 21, 1945, the provisional government conducted a dual referendum on the Constituent Assembly's formation and organized elections. Women and soldiers voted for the first time in the referendum and Assembly elections, with deputies elected for a limited term of seven months.

The referendum's first question asked: "Do you want the National Assembly elected today to be constituent?"

- If "yes" prevailed, the Assembly would draft a new Constitution to establish a new Republic.
- If "no" prevailed, the Assembly would reestablish the 1875 Constitution and the Third Republic, constituting the 17th legislature of the Third Republic.

Blaming the 16th legislature for the June 1940 humiliation, 96% of voters approved the "yes" option.

The second question asked whether the Assembly's powers should be limited by a provisional constitutional framework proposed by the government or unlimited, allowing the Assembly to independently organize public powers. Two-thirds of voters endorsed limiting the Assembly's powers, leading to the Provisional Constitutional Law of November 2, 1945.

== Composition of the Constituent Assembly ==
The elections on October 21, 1945, resulted in a strong victory for the left-wing, highlighting three main parties forming the "Tripartisme" coalition:

- The French Communist Party (PCF), highly regarded for its role in the Resistance and Soviet victory, secured 26% of the vote and 160 seats. This ended the first government of Charles de Gaulle on November 2, 1945, as the PCF claimed significant government influence.
- The Popular Republican Movement (MRP), a Christian democratic party supported by de Gaulle.
- The French Section of the Workers' International (SFIO).

Other political outcomes:

- The Radical Party, dominant during the Third Republic, suffered catastrophic results.
- The right-wing, discredited by collaboration with Pierre Laval, lost two-thirds of its electorate.

The left held an absolute majority, with Félix Gouin serving as Assembly President. Women constituted 5.6% of the deputies.

=== Parliamentary groups ===

The distribution of deputies by parliamentary group as of November 23, 1945, was as follows:

Parliamentary Group			Deputies		
Parliamentary Group			Members	Associated	Total
Communist	COM	151	0	151	
Progressive Union (Republicans and Resistance)	RR	8	0	8	
Socialist	SOC	139	0	139	
Algerian Muslim (aligned with Socialist)	MA	7	0	7	
Democratic and Socialist Resistance	RDS	27	4	31	
Paysan (aligned with Democratic and Socialist Resistance)	PAYSAN	6	5	11	
Radical and Radical-Socialist	RRS	24	3	27	
Popular Republican Movement	MRP	150	0	150	
Republican Union	UR	37	2	39	
Independent Republicans	RI	14	0	14	
Total members of parliamentary groups	577				
Total seats				586	

== Promulgation of the Provisional Constitutional Law ==
On November 2, 1945, the government of Charles de Gaulle promulgated the Provisional Constitutional Law and dissolved itself pending the formation of the Constituent Assembly to elect a new government leader and adopt a new Constitution. De Gaulle resigned on January 20, 1946, opposing the "regime of parties."

== Works ==
=== Under Charles de Gaulle's government ===
The nationalization of the Banque de France and four major French banks occurred swiftly, avoiding speculation. The bill was submitted on November 30, 1945, and passed by December 2, 1945.

=== Under Félix Gouin's government ===
Key achievements included:

- Nationalization of EDF and GDF (April 8, 1946).
- Abolition of regulated prostitution (April 13, 1946).
- Abolition of forced labor (April 11, 1946).

== Dissolution ==
After the constitution was rejected, the Assembly and Gouin Government were dissolved. New elections were held on June 2, 1946, to form a Constituent Assembly of 1946.
