= Proposed Constitution of April 19, 1946 =

Draft of the French constitution

Draft French Constitution of 19 April 1946
- Created: 19 April 1946
- Ratified: Rejected on 5 May 1946
- Location: France
- Author(s): First Constituent Assembly of 1945
- Signatories: Deputies of the Constituent Assembly
- Purpose: Proposal for a new French Constitution

The Draft French Constitution of 19 April 1946 (Projet de Constitution française du 19 avril 1946) was the constitutional text drafted by the first Constituent Assembly elected under the Constitutional Law of 1945. This draft constitution was approved by the deputies on 19 April 1946 with 309 votes in favor and 249 against and subsequently submitted to a referendum on 5 May 1946. On this occasion, the electorate rejected it with 52.82% voting against.

In accordance with the Constitutional Law of 1945, a new constituent assembly was elected on 2 June 1946. It drafted a new constitution, which, after being submitted to a referendum, was adopted: this was the Constitution of 27 October 1946.

== Background ==
The Constituent Assembly of 1945 had a left-wing majority, dominated by the French Communist Party (PCF) and the French Section of the Workers' International (SFIO).

The Provisional Government of the French Republic was initially presided over by General Charles de Gaulle, who resigned on 20 January 1946 due to lack of support from the Constituent Assembly. As an independent figure without party affiliation, de Gaulle's coalition government, which included ministers from various political backgrounds, could not last. His successor, Félix Gouin, a socialist, led an even shorter-lived government.

The draft, hastily prepared by the deputies, aimed to establish a parliamentary regime. It was sharply criticized by the right, which urged voters to reject it, while the Popular Republican Movement (MRP), despite being represented in Gouin's cabinet, showed little enthusiasm for the draft after compromising on several points during its formulation. The "No" campaign proved effective, and voters rejected the draft constitution on 5 May 1946.

In the Bayeux speech the following month, de Gaulle outlined his vision for the new constitution, hoping to influence the subsequent debates, though his ideas were largely ignored.

== Main Provisions ==
The draft proposed establishing a unicameral parliamentary regime, with a single assembly elected by direct universal suffrage for a five-year term. The senate, seen by the left as a conservative institution, was to be replaced by two consultative bodies: the Economic Council, a precursor to the Economic, Social and Environmental Council, and the Council of the French Union.

The executive was divided between a President of the Republic, who served as a largely ceremonial head of state, and a President of the Council, who led the government. Both were elected by the National Assembly, with a two-thirds majority required for the former and an absolute majority for the latter. The President of the Council was required to have the Assembly's approval for the composition and program of their cabinet through a vote of confidence. The dismissal of a cabinet required a majority of all deputies, not just those present. The President of the Republic served a seven-year term and was politically irresponsible, with powers limited to granting pardons, requesting a second legislative deliberation, and dissolving the Assembly.

Critics argued that the draft placed excessive power in the hands of Parliament without sufficient checks, raising concerns about potential drift toward a parliamentary regime or even a party-dominated system, perpetuating the long-standing issue of governmental instability. While the dissolution of an ungovernable National Assembly was possible, it required approval by two-thirds of the deputies or occurred if the Assembly caused "two ministerial crises during the same annual session" (through a vote of no confidence or a motion of censure). This provision left room for frequent cabinet changes within a single legislature.

The drafters showed considerable faith in the legislature, and despite compromise proposals, decided not to establish any body or procedure for judicial review of legislation.

Any constitutional amendment required the approval of a majority of deputies, followed by a referendum.

An innovative aspect of the draft was its emphasis on decentralization. Title VIII ("On Local Communities") paved the way for laws strengthening the powers of departments and communes, as well as overseas territories and federations.

== See also ==
- French constitutional referendum, May 1946
