= Congress of the French Parliament =

Joint meeting of parliament at Versailles

The Congress of the French Parliament (French: Congrès du Parlement français) is the name given to the body created when both houses of the present-day French Parliament—the National Assembly and the Senate—meet at the Palace of Versailles to vote on revisions to the Constitution or to listen to an address by the President of the French Republic.

== History ==
Historically, during the Third Republic, the reunion of both houses of the French Parliament — the Chamber of Deputies and the Senate — was called the National Assembly (Assemblée nationale) and gathered in Versailles to elect the President of France and to amend the Constitution. During the Fourth Republic, the Congress of the French Parliament was the reunion of the National Assembly and the Council of the Republic (Conseil de la République); it used to gather to elect the President of France. The last president elected this way was René Coty who was elected on 23 December 1953.

== Composition and organization ==
The Congress is composed of senators and deputies who come together in the meeting hall (salle des séances) of the southern wing of the Château of Versailles. Its officers and its president are those of the National Assembly.

Parliament (Congress) composition in 2024

== Constitutional revision ==
According to Article 89 of the Constitution of the Fifth Republic, revisions to the constitution may be instigated by either deputies or senators (this is called "proposition de révision"), or by the President of the Republic through proposals submitted by the Prime Minister (this is called "projet de révision").

The normal procedure of constitutional revision is through national referendum. However, in the case of "projet de révision", the President may turn to a more flexible and less demanding procedure. The constitution stipulates that However, a Government Bill to amend the Constitution shall not be submitted to referendum where the President of the Republic decides to submit it to Parliament convened in Congress; the Government Bill to amend the Constitution shall then be approved only if it is passed by a three-fifths majority of the votes cast. The Bureau of the Congress shall be that of the National Assembly.

The Congress traditionally takes place in Versailles.

== Address by the President of France ==
Since the Constitutional revision of 2008, Article 18 states that the President "... may take the floor before Parliament convened in Congress for this purpose. His statement may give rise, in his absence, to a debate without vote." This Congress, like the Constitutional one, is convened in Versailles.

The first President to use this new Constitutional right was Nicolas Sarkozy on 22 June 2009. The previous presidential speech to France's parliament was in 1873, before lawmakers banned the practice to protect the separation of powers and keep the president in check.

François Hollande made a speech to Congress under this provision on 16 November 2015 regarding the November 2015 Paris attacks.

Emmanuel Macron made a speech to Congress on July 3, 2017 and plans to do it every year.

== Stamp collecting ==
The meeting of the French Congress is the occasion for the creation of a temporary post office and a special cancellation mark. Mail sent from this office is highly sought after by stamp collectors who often ask their senator or deputies to send them mail from the Congress.
