= Deputy (France) =

Representatives in the National Assembly of France

Deputies (French: députés and députées, (Note: Masculine and feminine. Singular: député and députée, respectively. All pronounced identically.) pronounced [depyte]), also known in English as members of Parliament (MPs), are the legislators who sit in the National Assembly, the lower house of the French Parliament. The 17th and current legislature of the Fifth Republic has a total of 577 deputies, elected in single-member constituencies across metropolitan (539) and overseas France (27), as well as for French residents overseas (11).

== Name ==
The term "deputy" is associated with the legislator's task to deputise for the people of his or her constituency.

== Current ==
There are currently 577 legislative seats in the National Assembly. They are elected through the two-round system in single-member constituencies.

== Numbers ==
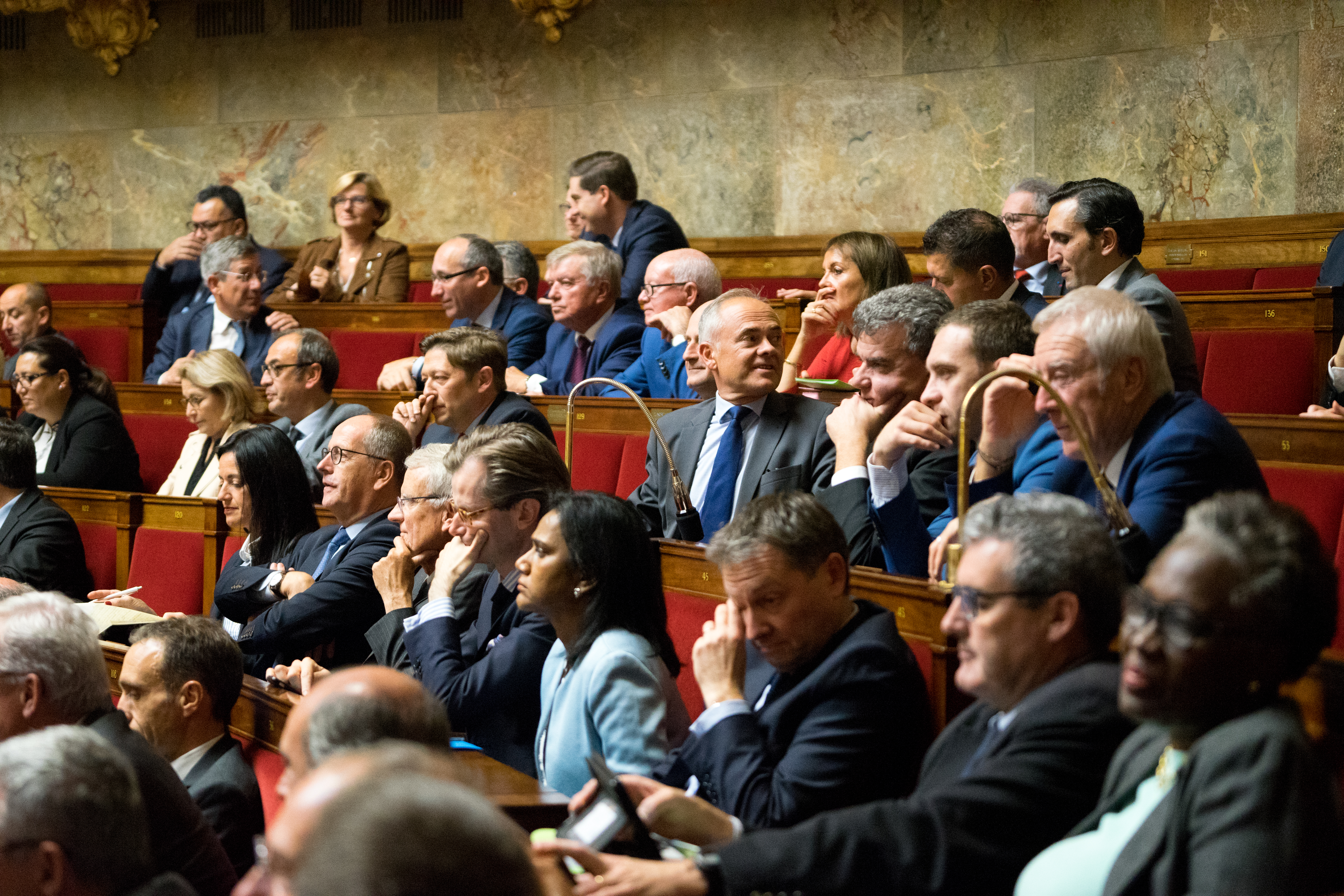
Deputies in the National Assembly chamber in 2018

The number of deputies is codified in the Constitution of France.

In 2019, it was reported that the Government of France wanted to cut the number of deputies by 25%. This reform was later abandoned due to a lack of support in the Senate.

== Restrictions and privileges ==
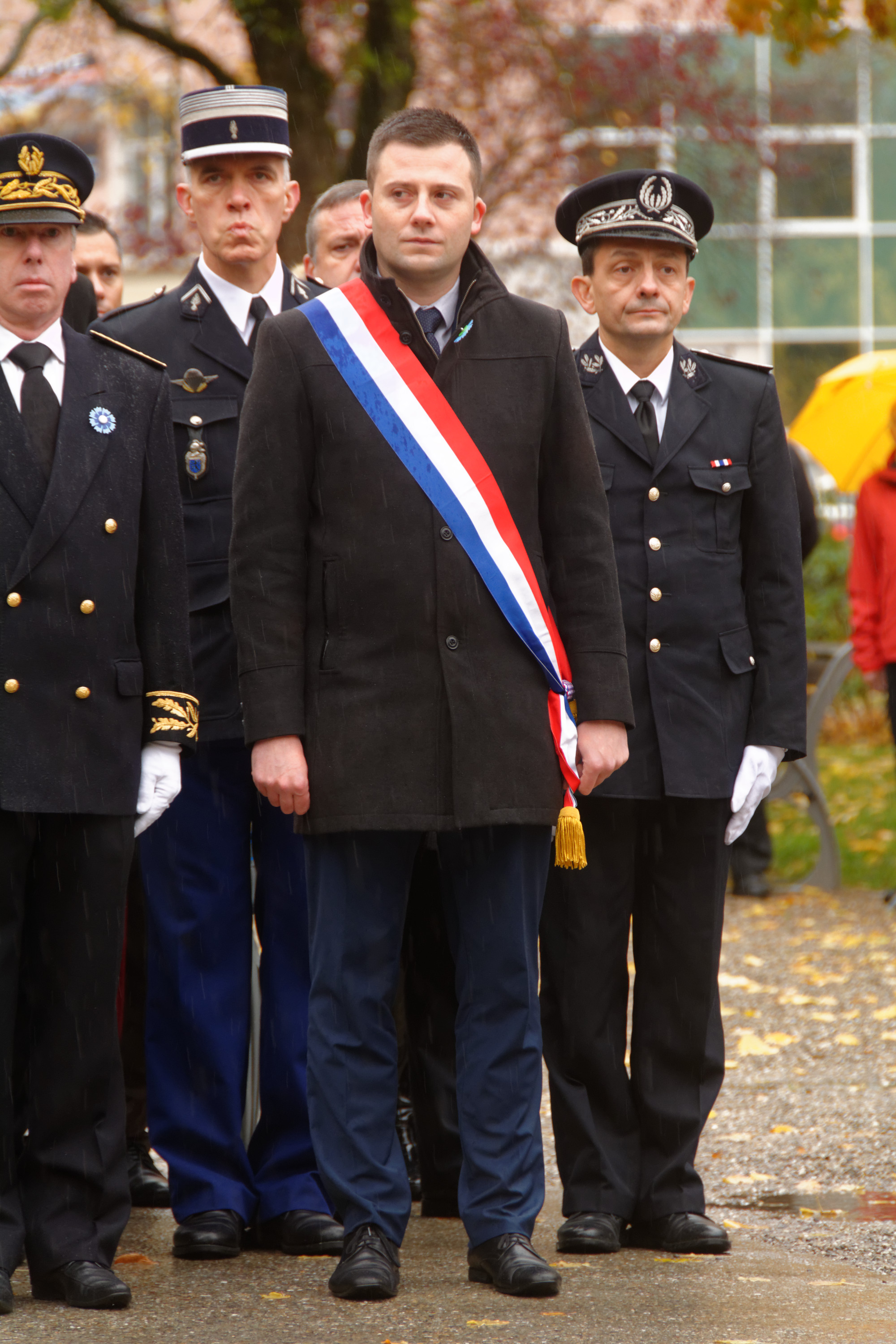
Deputy Ian Boucard wearing his official sash

Deputies have parliamentary immunity. They enjoy total freedom of expression within the National Assembly chamber, although they can be sanctioned by a majority of deputies for not complying with the rules of procedure. The maximum penalty is a 15-day suspension from sitting in Parliament. As of 2023 and since 1958, the maximum penalty has been voted three times; the most recent was against La France Insoumise deputy Thomas Portes, who pictured Labour Minister Olivier Dussopt decapitated on social media. A deputy cannot be removed from office by other deputies.

Like senators and members of the executive, deputies have to submit a declaration of interests and assets to the Haute Autorité pour la transparence de la vie publique (HATVP). Such declarations are then verified and made publicly accessible. Like senators, deputies hold various privileges. They can inspect – without having to announce their visit prior to arrival – a number of sites managed on behalf the executive to verify compliance with laws voted by Parliament.

It is common for deputies, wearing their distinctive sash, to place themselves at the front of demonstrations, with the aim of being recognisable to police forces and protecting individuals behind them. At a 2023 demonstration in Sainte-Soline, Deux-Sèvres, deputies formed a line in front of police on site to allow medical teams to evacuate wounded participants who had clashed with police forces. Wearing an official sash without the proper rights constitutes a punishable offence.

Deputies, like senators, can have a dual mandate at the local level (most notably municipal, departmental, regional councillor) but a new law that entered in application in 2017 has limited the practice's extent by restricting national officials' ability to serve in local executives. Deputies are paid 5,782.66 euros per month.

== Eligibility ==
Candidates can run for a seat in the National Assembly when they hold French citizenship, are at least 18 years old, as well as not have been declared incompetent in court or sentenced to a loss of civic rights.
