= Constitutional law of 2 November 1945 =

French Provisional Constitutional Law

Overview
- Original title: Loi constitutionnelle portant organisation provisoire des pouvoirs publics
- Jurisdiction: France
- Presented: 21 October 1945
- Date effective: November 3, 1945
- System: Unitary parliamentary republic

Government structure
- Branches: two (legislative and executive)
- Chambers: one, the National Assembly
- Executive: head of the Provisional Government of the French Republic
- [[s:fr:Loi constitutionnelle du 2 novembre 1945|Loi constitutionnelle portant organisation provisoire des pouvoirs publics]] at French Wikisource

The French constitutional Law of 2 November 1945 was an interim, transitional constitutional law that set a legal basis for government in France under the Provisional Government of the French Republic (GPRF) for one year until a new constitution was approved.

The law was adopted by popular referendum as part of the 1945 French legislative election on 21 October 1945. Results were promulgated on 3 November 1945. The law provided a provisional constitutional structure for republican government in France which had been re-established in Metropolitan France in June 1944 under the aegis of the Provisional Government of the French Republic (GPRF) led by General Charles de Gaulle. It lasted for a year, until the Assembly drafted a new constitution which became the foundation for the new, Fourth Republic in October 1946.

== Background ==
=== Third Republic ===
In the latter part of the nineteenth century and first part of the twentieth, France was a republic that was governed by the constitutional Laws of 1875 that established the Third Republic. It consisted of a Chamber of Deputies and a Senate as the legislative branch of government, and a president to serve as head of state. This republican governmental structure lasted through the first half of 1940, until the German invasion of France in World War II precipitated the downfall of the Third Republic in July 1940.

=== World War II and Vichy ===
France under German occupation, with the Vichy regime in the south.

During World War II, France was invaded by Nazi Germany in 1940. Defeat was imminent, and France's military situation was dire. Paul Reynaud resigned as prime minister, rather than sign an armistice with Germany, and was replaced by Marshal Philippe Pétain, a hero of World War I. Shortly thereafter, Pétain signed the Armistice of 22 June 1940. Under terms of the armistice, France was carved up into two sectors, the north and west under direct German military occupation, and the south and east under the control of the nominally independent but repressive rump state under Marshall Philippe Pétain known as the Vichy regime.

On 10 July 1940 the National Assembly, comprising both the Senate and Chamber of Deputies, met in joint session in the spa town of Vichy and voted by 569 to 80 to grant full and extraordinary powers to Marshal Pétain. By the same vote, they also granted Pétain the power to write a new constitution. (Note: Given full constituent powers in the law of 10 July 1940, Pétain never promulgated a new constitution. A draft was written in 1941 and signed by Pétain in 1944 but it was never submitted or ratified.) By Act No. 2 on the following day, Pétain defined his own powers and abrogated any Third Republic laws that were in conflict with them. (Note: The French Constitutional Law of 1940 would later be annulled in August 1944.) By these acts, the National Assembly dissolved itself, the Third Republic was over, and in its place was the Vichy regime, (Note: The official title of the Vichy regime was "the French State" (État français).) a repressive, German client state under the autocratic control of Marshal Pétain.

=== Liberation and Provisional Government ===
The Allies invaded France in June 1944 (Note: The battle to liberate France began with the D-day landings on 6 June 1944 in the Battle of Normandy in the north, and continued in August with Operation Dragoon in the south.) and within a year had liberated the country with the support of the Free French Forces which were based in London under General Charles de Gaulle. Looking ahead to victory and the future reconstitution of France as a constitutional republic after the war, de Gaulle formed the Provisional Government of the French Republic (GPRF) on 3 June 1944 in order to help organize the continuing Free French armed opposition to Germany, and to provide some sort of legal structure for governing France during and after the final phase of the war. (Note: Earlier bodies formed by de Gaulle during the war to provide some level of governing or coordinating control and political direction to the Free French forces and to rally support included the Empire Defense Council, the French National Committee, the French Committee of National Liberation, and the Provisional Consultative Assembly.)

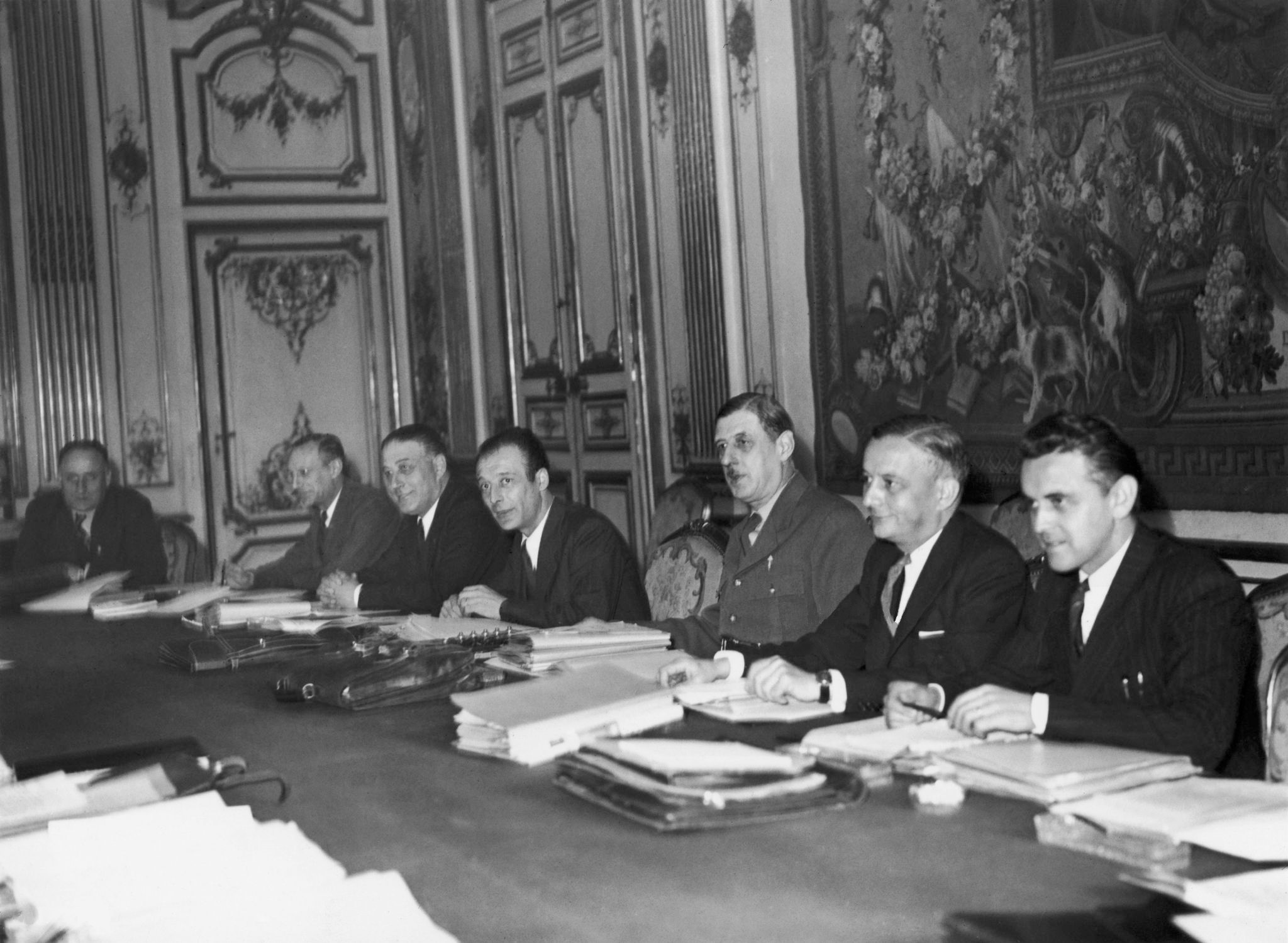
General Charles de Gaulle and the ministers of the Provisional Government, 2 November 1945

Establishment of the Provisional Government marked the official restoration and re-establishment of a provisional French Republic, assuring continuity with the defunct French Third Republic. It succeeded the French Committee of National Liberation (CFLN), which had been the provisional government of France headquartered in the overseas territories and metropolitan parts of the country (Algeria and Corsica) that had been liberated by the Free French. As the provisional wartime government of France in 1944–1945, the main purposes of the GPRF were to handle the aftermath of the occupation of France and continue to wage war against Germany as one of the Allies. Its other chief objective was to prepare the ground for a new constitutional order that resulted in the Fourth Republic. It also made several important reforms and political decisions, such as granting women the right to vote.

By May 1945, France was liberated, Germany was defeated, Vichy leaders were in jail or on the run, and the war in Europe was over. The GPRF was now in charge of the territory of Metropolitan France, and turned to the task of organizing elections which would decide the future path of the country.

== Election and referendum ==
Legislative elections were organized by the GPRF and set for 21 October 1945 with two goals: to elect a parliament, and to hold a referendum to decide on a constitutional order for the country. The referendum asked voters about whether France should return to the constitution of 1875 (which would have restored the Third Republic), to give the new Assembly unlimited constituent power to draw up a new constitution, or to give limited and temporary constituent power to the Assembly and charge it with drawing up a new constitution in a limited timeframe. The voters, including women for the first time ever in parliamentary elections, (Note: Women's suffrage was introduced by the French Committee of National Liberation in the Ordinance of 21 April 1944, and reconfirmed by the GPRF on 5 October 1944.) chose the third option.

The voters overwhelmingly chose to empower the newly elected Assembly as a constituent assembly tasked with writing a new constitution, and in the meantime to adopt the constitutional law listed on the back of the ballot as the organizing law of the land until a new constitution could be drafted. Because of laws passed earlier by the CFLN and the Provisional Government, this election was the second election in France in which women were able to vote, the first being the municipal elections of 1945.

== Scope ==
The constitutional law of 1945 remained in effect for a year, until the assembly drafted and passed the new Constitution of 27 October 1946, establishing the Fourth Republic.

== See also ==
- Constitutionalism
- Constitution of France
- Constitutions of France
- Fifth Republic (France)
- French Committee of National Liberation
- French Community
- French Constitutional Council
- French Fourth Republic
- French law
- French Union
- Government of France
- Politics of France
- Second Bayeux speech

== Works cited ==
- Badsey, Stephen (1990). Normandy 1944: Allied Landings and Breakout. Oxford: Osprey Publishing. ISBN 978-0-85045-921-0.
- Beigbeder, Yves (29 August 2006). Judging War Crimes and Torture: French Justice and International Criminal Tribunals and Commissions (1940-2005). Leiden: Martinus Nijhoff/Brill. p. 140. ISBN 978-90-474-1070-6. OCLC 1058436580.
- Caramani, Daniele (13 February 2017). Elections in Western Europe 1815-1996. Springer. ISBN 978-1-349-65508-3. OCLC 1085235961.
- Clark, Lloyd (2008). Crossing the Rhine: Breaking into Nazi Germany, 1944 and 1945 – The Greatest Airborne Battles in History. New York, NY: Atlantic Monthly Press. ISBN 978-0-87113-989-4. OCLC 223915610.
- "Constitutional act no. 2, defining the authority of the chief of the French state". Journal Officiel de la République française. 11 July 1940. Archived from the original on 8 December 2015.
- Knapp, Andre (27 June 2007). "Introduction". In Knapp, Andrew (ed.). The Uncertain Foundation: France at the Liberation 1944-47. Springer. p. 2. ISBN 978-0-230-22290-8. OCLC 1047640323.
- "Ordonnance du 9 août 1944 relative au rétablissement de la légalité républicaine sur le territoire continental – Version consolidée au 10 août 1944" [Law of 9 August 1944 Concerning the reestablishment of the legally constituted Republic on the mainland – consolidated version of 10 August 1944]. gouv.fr. Legifrance. 9 August 1944. Archived from the original on 16 July 2009.
- Maury, Jean-Pierre (2004). "Loi constitutionnelle du 10 Juillet 1940" [Constitutional law of 10 July 1940]. Mjp.univ-perp.fr. Archived from the original on 23 July 2001.
- Muracciole, Jean-François (2009). Les Français libres [The Free French]. Histoires D'aujourd'hui (in French). Paris: Tallandier. ISBN 978-2-84-734596-4. OCLC 7350216963.
- Kershaw, Angela (20 July 2018). Translating War: Literature and Memory in France and Britain from the 1940s to the 1960s. Springer. pp. 42–. ISBN 978-3-319-92087-0. OCLC 1045629669. "On 3 June 1944 the CFLN became the Gouvernement provisoire de la République française (GPRF), the Provisional Government of the French Republic, and was recalled to Paris at the end of August 1944."
- Singh, Ram Ayodhya (22 January 2022). Women and other Marginalized Section in the Politics of Developing Countries. New Delhi: K.K. Publications. ISBN 978-8-178-44195-5. OCLC 897793530.
- Umbreit, Hans (1991) [1st pub. Deutsche Verlags-Anstalt:1979 'Das Deutsche Reich und der Zweite Weltkrieg, Bd. 2']. "The Battle for Hegemony in Western Europe". In P. S. Falla (ed.). Germany and the Second World War. Vol. 2: Germany's Initial Conquests in Europe. Oxford: Oxford University Press. pp. 227–326. ISBN 978-0-19-822885-1. OCLC 464127303.
- Wieviorka, Olivier (2008). Normandy: The Landings to the Liberation of Paris. Harvard University Press. ISBN 978-0-674-02838-8. OCLC 1166488535.
