= Tréveneuc law =

French law

Tréveneuc law Loi Tréveneuc

National Assembly
- Long title: Loi du 15 février 1872 relative au rôle éventuel des conseils départementaux dans des circonstances exceptionnelles
- Citation: Law of 15 Feb. 1872
- Territorial extent: France
- Passed by: National Assembly
- Passed: February 15, 1872

Keywords
- exceptional circumstances, derogation
- Status: In force (amended)

The Tréveneuc Law (French: loi Tréveneuc) was a law passed in the early days of the French Third Republic which established a legal framework by which the country could invoke a state of emergency (régime d'exception) in order to oppose a power grab by a rogue chief executive who illegitimately dissolved the National Assembly.

The law was passed on 15 February 1872 by the National Assembly of France during the provisional period of the Third Republic.

There were several occasions where serious discussion or attempts to invoke the Tréveneuc law arose, in particular several times during World War II, either by the Vichy regime, or by those opposing it.

In 150 years, the law has never been repealed and is still in force, and since 2000 has been mentioned in political discourse in France under a number of different circumstances.

== Name and date ==
The Tréveneuc law is entitled, "the law of 15 February 1872 relating to the possible role of departmental councils in exceptional circumstances". (Note: The official name is loi du 15 février 1872 relative au rôle éventuel des conseils départementaux dans des circonstances exceptionnelles.)

It is usually dated 15 February 1872 in France, the day of its adoption. But it is also known as the law of 22 February 1872 in France, the day of its promulgation.

It is also known as the Tréveneuc Constitution because it is one of the constitutional laws adopted by the National Assembly elected on 8 February 1871 in France.

== Development ==
On 25 July 1871, Henri, Viscount of Tréveneuc and representative of Côtes-du-Nord in the National Assembly, presented a bill, co-authored by Charles de Janzé and Émile Depasse. On August 11, 1781, its examination in committee began. On February 5, 1872, the discussion began. On February 15, 1872, the National Assembly adopted it by 480 votes to 75. On February 22, 1872, Adolphe Thiers, President of the Republic, promulgated it. The following day, it was published in the Official Journal; then, on March 30, 1872, in the Bulletin des lois.

== Description ==
Under the exceptional circumstances envisioned by the law, the power normally held by the national legislature is partially devolved to the departmental councils, who are to meet "immediately" to maintain public order locally, and calls for the establishment of an "Assembly of Delegates" (assemblée des délégués) consisting of two delegates elected from each departmental council. The delegates are to rejoin the legal members of the government wherever they happen to be, and to jointly take all necessary measures to maintain order and to ensure the independence and viability of the National Assembly, including calling for national elections. If after a month the National Assembly is still not back, then the emergency framework invests the Assembly of Delegates with further powers, including both legislative and administrative power, and instills its executive decisions with a legal force which are obligatory on all agents of public order, under penalty of "forfeiture".

It is sometimes characterized as part of the constitution, or called the "Tréveneuc constitution".

The Tréveneuc law consists of six articles.

It provides for its use in the event that the Parliament is illegally dissolved (Note: Under the Constitution of October 4, 1958, dissolution is the exclusive prerogative of the President of the Republic. The Constitution prohibits him from dissolving the Senate. The dissolution of the National Assembly is subject to three limits: the President of the Republic may not dissolve the National Assembly again during the year following a dissolution; he may not dissolve it during the application of Article 16 of the Constitution; and the National Assembly may not be dissolved by the President of the Senate acting as President of the Republic.) or prevented from sitting, for any reason whatsoever, in the places (Note: Under article 2 of Ordinance no. 58-1100 of November 17, 1958 on the functioning of parliamentary assemblies, the National Assembly sits at the Palais Bourbon, and the Senate at the Palais du Luxembourg.) assigned to them in Paris (Note: Under the terms of paragraph 1 of article 1 of the aforementioned ordinance, the National Assembly and Senate are based in Paris.) or in any other city where the Government has transferred the seat of public powers.

The second article establishes the measures to be implemented if the National Parliament is unable to meet: it is thus up to the general councils to meet and provide "urgently for the maintenance of public tranquility and legal order".

Articles 3 to 6 relate to the assembly of delegates from the departmental councils. Each county council must elect two delegates. The general councils must each send two delegates to the Government (article 3) - which supposes that the latter has been able to escape the cause which prevents the Parliament from meeting, in order to constitute a provisional deliberative assembly with the possible national deputies who could have followed the Government.

The law assigns itself a double objective: to provide for the measures immediately necessary for the administration of the country, and for the restoration of the constitutional mandate, either of that previously in progress, or of a new one, resulting from general elections, which must be convened after one month of exercise of the "Assembly of Delegates".

The text recognises the events of the war of 1870, and therefore a desire to guard against their repetition, or against a civil war which would prevent Parliament from meeting.

== Attempted uses ==
=== Giraud in 1943 ===
The law was used to justify the creation of Free France and the Provisional Government of the French Republic.

=== Guadeloupe ===
On 17 June in Guadeloupe, one of France's colonial possessions in the Caribbean, Paul Valentino announced that he was going to ask the Departmental Council of Guadeloupe to apply the Tréveneuc law, and on 1 July, he repeated his request at an extraordinary session. President Nicolas Sarkozy paid homage to Valentino and others in a 2009 speech, saying of Valentino: "Steeped in the republican spirit, Valentino believed in the law. That's why he was the first to invoke an old law of the Third Republic, the Tréveneuc Law, to declare the new regime, born under the German boot, illegal." (Note: From President Sarkozy's speech in 2009: "Paul Valentino faisait preuve de la même lucidité lors d'une séance extraordinaire du Conseil général de la Guadeloupe : "Français nous sommes, Français nous voulons rester, et si l'Allemagne règne sur la métropole française, elle ne règnera pas en Guadeloupe où nous saurons revendiquer les prérogatives que nous accorde la législation française." Pétri d'esprit républicain, Valentino croyait au droit. C'est pourquoi il fût le premier à invoquer une vieille loi de la Troisième République, la loi Treveneuc, pour déclarer illégal le nouveau régime, né sous la botte allemande.")

=== Vichy ===
René Cassin argued that the armistice of 22 June was null and void by virtue of the Tréveneuc law.

In order to prevent its implementation, the Vichy Regime passed two laws: the first, of 18 August, prohibited the general councils from meeting spontaneously; the second, of 12 October, suspended the sessions of the general councils and transferred their powers to the prefects. The Tréveneuc law appeared at the top of the page of the constitutional declaration of 16 November, in which Charles de Gaulle supplemented the Brazzaville Manifesto of 27 October.

=== Algeria ===
According to Michèle Cointet-Labrousse, the General Councils of Algeria considered implementing the Tréveneuc Law in 1943.

=== Washington ===
The attitude of U.S. President Franklin D. Roosevelt in late 1943 and early 1944 towards de Gaulle and FDR's reservations about recognizing the French Committee of National Liberation as far as an entity that would govern post-liberation was based on his view that a government ought to be based on an election by the people, and he took measures to restrict the authority of American authorities' interaction with the CFLN. It was in January 1944 that FDR wrote Alexis Léger, ex-secretary general of the Quai d'Orsay at the time of the armistice and ex-pat in the U.S. to seek advice on how de Gaulle's insistence on being recognized as head of a provisional government post-Liberation might be countered. Léger wrote Roosevelt stating that the Tréveneuc law should be invoked to determine the government of a post-war France, explaining that it would be illegal for Washington or any other foreign government to grant recognition to de Gaulle, based on the requirements of the law to either constitute a new national assembly, or to recreate the previous one—namely, the one at the end of the Third Republic, when the armistice was signed.

=== Post-Vichy and reestablishment of the Republic ===
The French Committee of National Liberation rejected the Tréveneuc law as a possible basis for the reestablishment of republican rule in France.

In discussions of the illegitimacy of Vichy and the continuity of the Republic after the Second World War, legal means were sought to justify this illegitimacy, and to establish a legal and constitutional basis for the abrogation of Vichy laws, and the continuity of the Republic. De Gaulle had no particular zeal for a return to the Third Republic, but the word "republic" had become associated with positive feelings about France beyond the specific meaning of the word, so the provisional government would just be a transitional state between Vichy and some form of Republic, which in theory would mean a return to the constitutional laws of 1875 under the Third Republic. However, a great number of deputies had died during the occupation, and hundreds were banned because of their actions during the war.

It was under these circumstances, that the Tréveneuc law was mentioned as a possible legal basis for the transition. The French Committee of National Liberation rejected this overture, however, preferring a solution that marked a separate course rather than something that represented a return to the Third Republic. The solution that was ultimately found, rested more upon the illegality of Vichy to begin with, based on earlier discussions between de Gaulle and Jules Jeanneney.

== Amendments and status ==
On October 3, 1980 in France, Jean-Louis Masson filed a bill No.1968 to supplement the Tréveneuc law.

It is still in force.

There was a debate on whether the law should remain in force. Adhémar Esmein and Maurice Hauriou believed that it had been repealed by the constitutional laws of February 24, 1875. Léon Duguit considered it to be in force. Hauriou argued that the "provisional constitutional laws" adopted by the National Assembly — namely, the Rivet law of August 31, 1871, the Broglie law of March 13, 1873, and the septennat law of November 20, 1873 — were repealed by the Constitution of 1875 in France. But he admitted that "there could be more doubts" regarding the Tréveneuc law.

The Tréveneuc law was neither repealed nor amended by law no. 82-213 of March 2, 1982 relating to the rights and freedoms of municipalities, departments and regions (Deferre law). It was neither repealed nor codified by Law No. 96-142 of February 21, 1996 relating to the legislative part of the General Code of Territorial Communities. It was not repealed by law no. 2011-525 of 17 May 2011 on the simplification and improvement of the quality of law (Warsmann law). It was amended by law no. 2013-403 of 17 May 2013 relating to the election of departmental councilors, municipal councilors and community councilors, and modifying the electoral calendar.

== Notes and references ==
Notes

== Works cited ==
- Bourdon; Pontier, Jean-Marie; Ricci, Jean-Claude (1998). Droit des collectivités territoriales (PDF). Droit public (in French). Paris: PUF. ISBN 2-13-049579-6. OCLC 406245087.
- Charmley, John (1982). "Harold Macmillan and the Making of the French Committee of Liberation". The International History Review. 4 (4). Taylor & Francis: 553–567. doi:10.1080/07075332.1982.9640295. JSTOR 40105247.
- Chathuant, Dominique (1992). "Loi Tréveneuc de février 1872 (applicabilité à la Guadeloupe en 1940-1943". In Corzani, Jack (ed.). Dictionnaire encyclopédique Désormeaux (in French). Vol. 7, Quimbois–Zyébôy (Corzani ed.). Desormeaux Books. pp. 1981–2343. ISBN 2-85275-020-1.
- Dosière, René; Fortier, Jean-Claude; Mastias, Jean (1985). Le nouveau conseil général. Pouvoir local (in French). Paris: Éd. ouvrières. OCLC 300261327.
- texte, France Ministère de l'intérieur Auteur du (1878-01-01). "Revue générale d'administration / publiée avec la collaboration de sénateurs, de députés, de membres du Conseil d'État, de fonctionnaires et de publicistes sous la direction de M. Maurice Block". Gallica (in French). p. 24.
- Guignard, Didier (2008). "La loi Tréveneuc ou l'improbable apothéose des conseils généraux". Bicentenaire du département de Tarn-et-Garonne : genèse, formation, permanence d'une trame administrative (PDF) (in French) (1st ed.). Toulouse: Presses de l'Université des sciences sociales de Toulouse. pp. 349–365. ISBN 978-2-915699-69-2.
- Guignard, Didier (2018-03-13), "Réflexions sur la relation collectivités territoriales - crise : un sinulier retour de balancier", in Larrieu, Jacques (ed.), Crise(s) et droit, Travaux de l'IFR (in French), Toulouse: Presses de l'Université Toulouse Capitole, pp. 187–203, ISBN 978-2-37928-041-2
- Haglund, David G. (2007). "Roosevelt as 'Friend of France'—But Which One?". Diplomatic History. 31 (5). doi:10.1111/j.1467-7709.2007.00658.x. JSTOR 24916104.
- République française; Secrétariat général du gouvernement (19 October 2022). "Légifrance Le service public de la diffusion du droit" [The public service for dissemination of the law]. Légifrance. Direction de l'information légale et administrative. ISSN 2270-8987. OCLC 867599055.
- Hauriou (1929). Précis de droit constitutionnel (in French). Paris: Sirey. OCLC 9245627.
- Knapp, Andrew (2007). The Uncertain Foundation: France at the Liberation 1944-47. Basingstoke: Palgrave Macmillan. p. 26. ISBN 9780230521216. OCLC 77831134.
- Minot, Eugène (2000). Département, conseil général, décentralisation (in French). Voiron et Paris: La Lettre du cadre territorial et Assemblée des départements de France. ISBN 2-84130-376-4. OCLC 47070023.
- Morelle, Chantal; Vaisse, Maurice (2004) [1st pub. Complexe:1996]. "La reconnaissance internationale : des enjeux contradictoires [International recognition: contradictory factors at stake]". In Fondation Charles de Gaulle (ed.). De Gaulle et la Libération [De Gaulle and the Liberation]. Questions à l'histoire. Brussels: fr:Éditions Complexe. doi:10.14375/NP.9782804800161. ISBN 978-2-8048-0016-1. OCLC 57056449. "...elle est invoqué à partir de 1943 pour rétablir la légalité républicaine."
- Pluen, Olivier (9 March 2016). Touzeil-Divina, Mathieu (ed.). "La loi « TREVENEUC » de 1872 : un régime d'exception oublié" [The "TREVENEUC" Act of 1872: a forgotten exceptional regime] (in French). Journal du Droit Administratif (JDA).
- Sarkozy, Nicolas (25 June 2009). "Déclaration de M. Nicolas Sarkozy, Président de la République, en hommage aux anciens combattants et résistants antillais de la Deuxième Guerre mondiale, à Fort-de-France le 25 juin 20099.[sic]" [Statement by Nicolas Sarkozy, President of the French Republic, in tribute to Antillean veterans and members of the Resistance of the Second World War, Fort-de-France, 25 June 20099[sic]] (in French). Élysée.
- Verpeaux, Michel (2018). "Leçon 8 : La démocratie parlementaire sous la IIIème République" [Lesson 8: Parliamentary democracy under the Third Republic] (PDF). UNJF. Université numérique juridique francophone. p. 3.
