= LGDJ =

The Librairie générale de droit et de jurisprudence is the main French publishing house in law, created in 1836.
