= French Constitution of 27 October 1946 =

Constitution of the French Republic
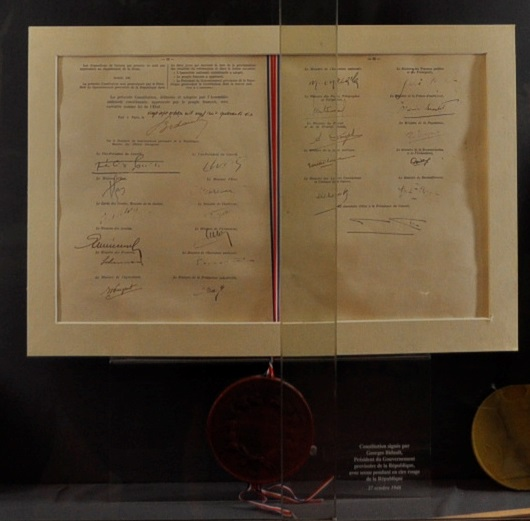
- Facsimile of the 1946 Constitution

Overview
- Jurisdiction: Provisional Government, Fourth Republic
- Created: 29 September 1946
- Presented: 28 October 1946
- Date effective: 24 December 1946
- System: Unitary parliamentary republic

Government structure
- Branches: Parliament, Executive
- Chambers: 2: National Assembly; Council of the Republic
- Executive: Dual: President of the Republic; President of the Council of Ministers

History
- Repealed: 4 October 1958
- Amendments: 2
- Last amended: Constitutional Law of 3 June 1958
- Supersedes: Constitutional Law of 2 November 1945
- Superseded by: French Constitution of 1958

Full text
- French Constitution of 1946 at Wikisource

The Constitution of the French Republic of 27 October 1946 (Note: Promulgated the 27th, recorded in the Journal Officiel the 28th.) was the constitution of the French Fourth Republic.

Adopted by the Constituent Assembly of 1946 on 29 September 1946, (Note: By 440 votes to 106 out of 546, the constitution was approved by referendum on October 13, 1946 following) (Note: By 9,263,416 "yes" against 8,143,931 "no", with 6,147,537 abstentions.) and promulgated by Georges Bidault, president of the Provisional Government of the French Republic, on 27 October 1946, it was published in the Official Journal of the French Republic the next day.

The question of the effective date of the constitution is debated. Following Georges Vedel, some authors, such as Louis Favoreu, maintain that the constitution "became effective in stages". (Note: In stages: entrée en vigueur par paliers.) Other authors, sticking to the letter of Article 98, paragraph 2 of the constitution, consider that its effective date was deferred until 24 December 1946, date of the first meeting of the Council of the Republic.

In the first instance, the constitution is that of the French Republic as the unitary state comprising the overseas departments and the overseas territories, known collectively as the DOM-TOM. But at the same time it is also that of the French Union, composed of the French Republic, the territories that it administered as agent of the League of Nations, and protectorates. The New Hebrides (present-day Vanuatu) was outside the Union. (Note: The postwar French occupation zones in Germany and in Austria remained outside the scope of the constitution.)

The constitution established a rationalized parliamentary system (Note: A rationalized parliamentary system is a set of constitutional and electoral law techniques designed to avoid excessive governmental instability in a parliamentary system) through mechanisms of reciprocal control between the executive and legislative branches.

The constitution was revised once, by the law of 7 December 1954.

The constitution was repealed by the French constitution of 4 October 1958, with the exception of its preamble, recognized as still in force by Decision 71-44 DC of the Constitutional Council in 1971.

== Adoption ==
At the end of the Second World War, the French provisional government of the French Republic headed by General de Gaulle chose to proceed in as democratic a manner as possible. An initial failure, the first draft constitution was voted down by the people. The second text succeeded in passing, although just barely.

In all, it took a year and six days for a new Constitution to take effect in France and fully stabilize the organization of French institutions.

=== Referendum of 21 October 1945 ===
The provisional government, through the ordonnance of August 17, 1945, called a constitutional referendum on 21 October 1945, to be held in parallel with legislative elections. This referendum asked two questions of French voters:

- "Do you want the National Assembly elected today to have the power to propose a constitution?
- "If the electorate answers yes to the first question, do you approve public power being organized, until the new constitution takes effect, in accordance with the above proposal?

This was not the first political election open to women voters; that was the municipal election held on 29 April 1945.

==== First question: 3B or 4th Republic ? ====
The first question was "Do you want the National Assembly elected today to have the power to propose a constitution?" (Note: First question: "Voulez-vous que l’Assemblée nationale, élue ce jour, soit constituante ?")

National results
Option	Votes	%
In favour	18,584,746	96,37
Against	699,136	3,63
Valid Votes	19,283,882	94,74
Blank and Nul Votes	1,070,103	5,26
Total	20,353,985	100
Abstentions	5,391,007	20,94
Registered / Participation	25,744,992	79.06

This question in reality asks about re-establishing the Constitution of the French Third Republic. There could be no continuity with the constitutional law of 1940, since it was considered illegitimate. Therefore it was ignored. On the other hand, the Constitution of 1875 could be re-established, as it was a legitimate legal text.

Since the voters agreed to a constituent assembly, and therefore a new Constitution, the Constitution of 1875 was therefore not re-established. Still, it was not yet formally repealed: the Ordinance of 9 August 1944 simply re-established republican rule of law, in declaring nul and void constitutional law published since 10 July 1940. In fact, it negated the very principle of a dissolution of the Third Republic by the Vichy régime: the constitutional laws of 1875 were the only constitutional laws recognized by the provisional government of the Republic of France, since no other new constitution, even provisional, had replaced them.

The new National Assembly therefore had a mission to draw up a new constitutional text.

==== Second question: Organisation of public power and constitutional transition ====
The second question was: "If the electorate answers yes to the first question, in the interim period until the new Constitution comes into force, should the public authorities be organized as described in the proposed Draft opposite?" (Note: Second question: Si le corps électoral a répondu oui à la première question, approuvez-vous que les pouvoirs publics soient, jusqu'à la mise en vigueur de la nouvelle Constitution, organisés conformément au projet ci-contre ?)

National results
Option	Votes	%
In favour	12,794,943	66,48
Against	6,449,206	33,51
Valid Votes	19,283,882	94.74
Blank and Nul Votes	1,070,103	5.26
Total	20,353,985	100
Abstentions	5,391,007	20.94
Registered/ Participation	25,744,992	79.06

If the French people had answered "No" to this question, the elected Constitutional Assembly would have defined "as it pleased" the relationships between public powers.

The attached text was in fact a legislative text, that would become constitutional if approved by the French people. This constitutional consecration, while precarious, thus would allow the public powers to submit to this law and to lead urgently needed political action. This text has also been called the "small Constitution".

This text not only had the goal of defining the adoption procedure for the Constitution, but also was established the relationships between public powers, in a minimalist text comprising only eight articles.

Thus, it describes political responsibility of the Government which is only valid under a hypothetical motion of censure by a majority of the members of the Fourth Republic National Assembly (Article 1). The Assembly had the initiative in law concurrently with the Government (Article 4). Finally, the president of the provisional government of the French Republic would be elected by the National Assembly, out of respect for the French parliamentary tradition.

Above all, this transitional constitution text gave only a very brief time in power to the Constituent Assembly: its time in office would end the day the new constitution took effect, or at the latest after seven months had past. The transition legitimately needed take place as soon as possible, but must still take place in a democratic manner. The Constitution adopted by the Assembly must be presented to the French for their approval in a referendum. If the electorate voted the text down, the same procedure was to again apply, with the election of a new Constituent Assembly.

The bill outlining the organisation of government power was adopted and promulgated, becoming the Constitutional law of 1945.

== Preamble ==
The Constitution of 1946 opens with a preamble that enriches the 1789 Declaration of the rights of man, affirming new constitutional rights, mostly social and economic.

It provided:

"The French people proclaim anew that every human being, with no distinction as to race, religion nor belief, possesses inalienable and sacred rights. They solemnly re-affirm the rights and liberties of man and of a citizen consecrated in the 1789 Declaration of Rights and the fundamental principles recognized by the laws of the Republic."

It gave a Constitutional meaning to principles considered "particularly necessary in our time":

- Equality between men and women,
- Right to asylum,
- Right to freely unionize
- Right to strike,
- Right to employment and a workplace free of discrimination,
- Right to participate in collective determination of work conditions as well as the management of employer enterprises.

Finally, it committed France to respecting international law.

The 1958 Constitution of the Fifth Republic consecrates this preamble, which thus retains its constitutional meaning. The wording of the preamble still has force today over the public powers, and its application has been assured by the Constitutional Council (Conseil constitutionnel) since its 1971 decision.

== Rationalised parliamentarianism ==
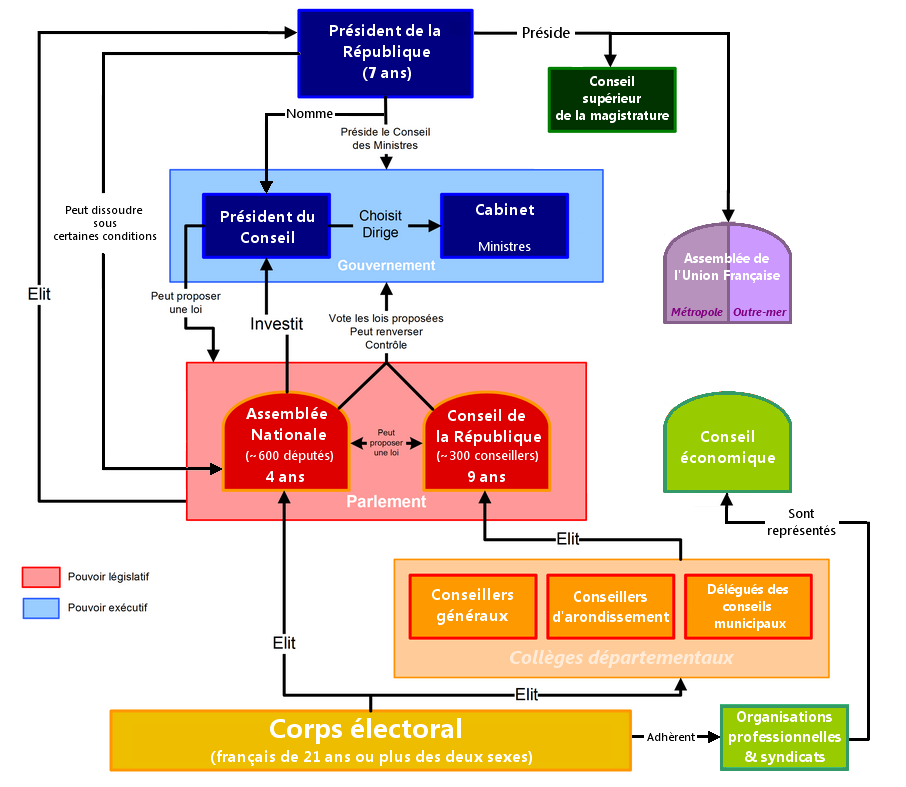
Two branches (executive and legislative) with bicameral legislature

Rationalized parliamentarianism describes the whole of the judicial rules that meticulously frame relations between parliament and government in order to assure governmental stability in the absence of a consistent parliamentary majority. The writers of the Constitution believed that an absence of such rules had led to the political instability of the Third Republic. "The most lasting of (the French constitutions), that of the Third Republic adopted in 1875, saw 93 different governments within 65 years." The concept of rationalized parliamentarianism was expressed by the Ukrainian-French jurist Boris Mirkine-Guetzevitch.

=== Bicameral parliament ===
According to Article 5 of the Constitution, "Parliament is composed of the National Assembly and of the Council of the Republic. Nonetheless, the legislative power resided, at the beginning of the Fourth Republic, solely in the National Assembly, by virtue of Article 13, which provided that the "National Assembly alone votes the law." Practice, as well as the 1954 Constitution itself, would nonetheless evolve towards a return to bicameralism.

The Chamber of deputies of the Fourth Republic was henceforth named the National Assembly, (the name of the combined Chamber of Deputies and Senate under the Third Republic). Composed of 627 members elected to a five-year term through universal direct suffrage (men, women and military), the Assembly alone held certain powers. It set the length of its sessions itself (at least eight months a year); it set its own agenda; it voted laws and the investiture of the government. The Assembly had little counterbalance.

The second chamber, the Council of the Republic, had a consultative role in 1946. It gave advice to the National Assembly, which could choose to not take it into account if it was not passed by an absolute majority. The recruitment system of the Council of the Republic was very complicated. Fifty of its 315 members were designated by the National Assembly (35 proportionately to the representation of the parliamentary groups that composed it, and 15 to represent the French overseas); 65 were designated by local assemblies overseas; 200 were elected by a body composed of deputies, 3,000 general councillors and 85,000 other electors. (127 were directly elected, and 73 nominated in proportion to the votes not cast).

=== Bicephalous executive ===
The executive was composed of

- the president of the Republic
- the president of the Council.

The president of the Republic was elected for a seven-year term by the Congress (National Assembly and Council of the Republic together) meeting in Versailles. He would be eligible for a second term if re-elected. He held the classic executive powers: pardons and diplomatic representation. He was to designate the president of the Council.

The president of the Republic presided at the Council of ministers, whose minutes he was to keep: he was to be the memory of the State. All his decisions would have had to be countersigned.

For the first time the role of the president of the Council was now recorded in the Constitution, whereas the office had been a mere custom under the Third Republic. He was responsible to the National Assembly. The procedure by which he took office was described in the Constitution: after designation by the president of the Republic, he appeared alone before the National Assembly and gave a policy speech. The Assembly was to confirm his nomination by an absolute majority of the 251 deputies, thus approving both the man and his program.

The idea was to allow governments some longevity, unlike what took place under the Third Republic. The president of the Council and his government were protected to avoid instability. A vote of confidence had to address the entirety of the government, rather than a single person. An entire intervening day was required between a question of confidence and its vote. Here too, approval of the vote required an absolute majority of the Assembly deputies.

The National Assembly was also protected, and difficult to dissolve. To do so required:

- that no less than 18 months have passed since the previous legislative elections,
- with at least two government crises in that period,
- and France to have been at least fifteen days without an (executive) government. Dissolution was then possible. The president of the Council must then resign (although not his government), and he was to be replaced by the president of the Assembly.

=== Rationalization procedure ===
For legislatures: Refusal to allow control by the second chamber of the legislative process, a personal confirmation of the president of the Council, and careful framing of any motion of censure as well as of a vote of confidence and dissolution.

In the 1946 text the second chamber is named the Council of the Republic (rather than Senate, too prestigious a name for a chamber whose role was simply advisory).

The personal confirmation meant that when the president of the Republic nominated the president of the Council, the latter needed in addition to obtain a vote of confidence from the National Assembly. This requirement was intended to give some weight to this head of the government and increase his political authority compared to other government ministers.

=== Failure of rationalization ===
Paul Ramadier was the first president of the Council, confirmed 21 January 1947. He put together his government and decided to come back before the National Assembly with his government, to seek a collective confirmation. As it happened, this was the beginning of double confirmation, taken as proof that the president of the Council did not dare to decide anything on his own and himself had put himself under the authority of the elected chamber.

In a parliamentary regime bringing judicial techniques to bear in order to stabilize the government is nothing without the support of a stable parliamentary majority. In the end one can say that rationalisation is often useless to a government once it has lost the confidence of the deputies. "When used improperly," rationalized parliamentarianism "might bring about government paralysis", warn the authors of a study of its attempted introduction in Eastern Europe.

== See also ==
- French Fourth Republic
- French law
- French Union
- Constitution of France
- French Fifth Republic

== Works cited ==
- Cartier, Emmanuel (December 2005). La transition constitutionnelle en France 1940-1945 (thesis). Bibliothèque constitutionnelle et de science politique 126 (in French) (1 ed.). Paris: LGDJ. ISBN 2-275-02674-6. OCLC 470417840.
- Favoreu, Louis (1996). "Les principes fondamentaux reconnus par les lois de la République" [The fundamental principles recognized by the laws of the Republic]. In Mathieu, Bertrand [in French]; Verpeaux, Michel [in French] (eds.). La République en droit français, actes du colloque de Dijon [The Republic in French Law, Proceedings of the Dijon Colloqium] (colloquium proceedings). Droit public positif (in French) (1 ed.). Paris: Economica. pp. 231–240. ISBN 9782717829785.
- Hamon, Francis [in French]; Troper, Michel [in French] (September 2017) [1st pub. Georges Burdeau, Cours de droit constitutionnel, 1942]. Droit constitutionnel [Constitutional Law]. Manuels/Droit public (in French) (37 ed.). Paris: LGDJ. ISBN 978-2-275-04929-8. OCLC 1005077136.
- "Constitution de la République française" [Constitution of the French Republic] (in French). 28 October 1946. JO1946. in: Journal officiel de la République française (in French). Vol. 78. 28 October 1946. pp. 9166–9175.
- République française; Secrétariat général du gouvernement (19 October 2022). "Légifrance Le service public de la diffusion du droit" [The public service for dissemination of the law]. Légifrance. Direction de l'information légale et administrative. ISSN 2270-8987. OCLC 867599055.
- Martin-Pannetier, Andrée (1981) [1st pub. 1971]. Institutions et vie politique françaises (in French) (2 ed.). Paris: LGDJ. ISBN 2-275-01097-1. OCLC 417437022.
- Miclo, François (1982). Le régime législatif des départements d'outre-mer et l'unité de la République. Droit public positif (in French) (1 ed.). Paris: Economica. ISBN 2-7178-0583-4. OCLC 465377212.
- Müller, Beat (24 January 2018). "Frankreich, 21. Oktober 1945: Interimsverfassung" [Interim Constitution of 21 October 1945]. sudd.ch (in German).
- Müller, Beat (4 October 2020). "Frankreich, 21. Oktober 1945 : Nationalversammlung als Verfassungsrat" [France, 21 October 1945: National Assembly as Constitutional Council]. sudd.ch (in German).
- Poulet-Gibot Leclerc, Nadine (August 2007) [1st pub. 1995]. Droit administratif [Administrative Law]. Lexifac/Droit (in French) (3 ed.). Rosny-sous-Bois: Bréal. ISBN 978-2-7495-0793-4. OCLC 470750338.
- Roux, Jérôme (November 2002). "La reconnaissance par le Conseil constitutionnel du principe fondamental reconnu par les lois de la République relatif à la justice des mineurs". Revue du droit public et de la science politique en France et à l'étranger (in French). 118 (6): 1731–1768.
- Sander, Éric (31 October 2017). "La situation du droit local alsacien-mosellan au début du XXI" [The situation of the Alsatian-Moselle local law at the beginning of the 21st century]. In Lienhard, Alain; Pérochon, Françoise; Rontchevsky, Nicolas; Roussel-Galle, Philippe; Storck, Michel (eds.). Mélanges en l'honneur de Jean-Luc Vallens (in French) (1 ed.). Issy-les-Moulineaux: Joly, hors coll. pp. 273–290. ISBN 978-2-306-00083-0. OCLC 1010744224.
- Tanchev, Evgeni (1995). "Historical and Psychological Sources Shaping Constitutionalism and Constitutional Performance in the Post-Communist Societies: Reflections on Constitutionalism in the Transition, or the Legacy of Transitory Constitutions". In Stanisław Frankowski; Paul B. Stephan III (eds.). Legal Reform in Post-Communist Europe: The View from Within. Martinus Nijhoff Publishers. p. 147. ISBN 0792332180.

Preceded by Constitutional law of 2 November 1945	Constitutions of France; Constitution of the Fourth Republic; 1946 - 1958	Succeeded by Constitution of the Fifth Republic
