= Parliamentary immunity in France =

Parliamentary immunity (French: immunité parlementaire) is an aspect of French politics. Members of the Parliament of France enjoy irresponsibility for what they did as parliamentarians, and partial inviolability – that is, severe restrictions for the police or justice to arrest or detain them. Both irresponsibility and inviolability are mandated by article 26 of the Constitution of France.

These dispositions are somewhat controversial, following abuse of such privileges.

== Irresponsibility ==
Members of the Parliament may not be sought, prosecuted, judged or imprisoned for actions that they have accomplished within their duties as parliamentarians. In particular, parliamentarians are immune from prosecution for defamation committed in the exercise of their functions. This includes speeches and votes in public sittings of the assemblies, law proposals, amendments, as well as reports and other actions commissioned by parliamentary instances. This, according to the jurisprudence, does not include interviews on broadcast radio, nor does it include reports commissioned by the executive branch – since such actions are not specific to the duties of a parliamentarian.

For interventions in public sitting, members of parliament are however still subject to the disciplinary rules of their assembly.

There is no way to lift this irresponsibility clause, and the parliamentarian himself or herself cannot renounce it. The termination of the parliamentary term does not allow the prosecution of former parliamentarians for actions committed within their parliamentarian duties.

== Inviolability ==
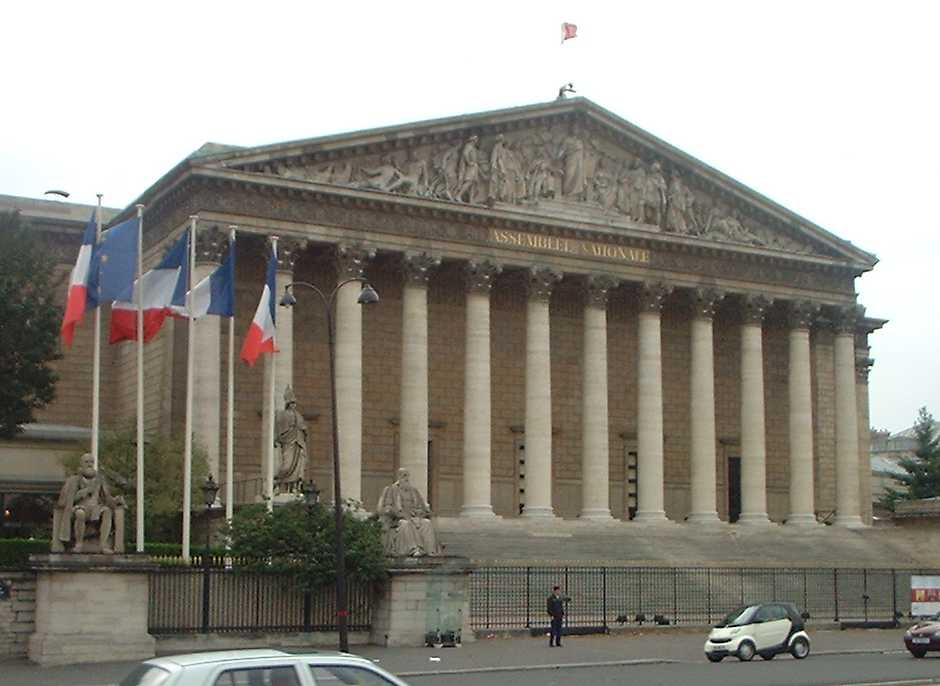
The National Assembly in Paris where the deputies protected by their immunity sit, which their Chamber can nevertheless partially lift (inviolability).

While members of parliament are not criminally responsible for their actions as parliamentarians, they are, however, responsible for their actions as private citizens. There are, however, strong limitations as to their prosecution.

Members of Parliament may be arrested or otherwise deprived of their freedom, or face restrictions thereof, only with the permission of the desk of their assembly. This authorization is not needed in case of a flagrant felony (e.g. the parliamentarian was caught red-handed) or in case of a definitive condemnation by a court of law. The assembly of which the parliamentarian is a member may oppose any such measure for the duration of the parliamentary session.

Requests for the arrest or detention of a parliamentarian are issued by the general prosecutor of the competent Court of Appeal, sent to the Minister of Justice, who transmits them to the Desk of the relevant assembly. The Desk examines the requests and rules on it; its ruling is published in the Journal Officiel.

== Controversy ==
The topic of parliamentarian immunity is somewhat controversial in France, especially in the context of scandals of corruption or graft involving politicians. Many resent such a mechanism, in which some influential members of society enjoy special rights and are not made accountable for their own actions.

In 2004, Charles Pasqua was voted in as a senator by conservative electors of the Paris region (the Senate is elected by an electoral college). This was denounced by critics, including the Canard Enchaîné, as a way to prevent Pasqua from being prosecuted for various alleged crimes of corruption and misuse of public funds. See corruption scandals in the Paris region.

Likewise, in early 2005, the idea was suggested that former Presidents of France should become senators-for-life, instead of being able to sit in the Constitutional Council. Ostensibly, this idea was a means to solve the problem of such former presidents as Valéry Giscard d'Estaing, who may not have kept to the strict duty of political neutrality in their speech expected from members of the council. This, however, was criticized as a way to provide Jacques Chirac with immunity for related scandals.
