= Louis Favoreu =

French academic and jurist

Louis Favoreu (September 5, 1936 – September 1, 2004) was a French academic, specialized in public law, and a jurist. He was born in Lucq-de-Béarn (Pyrénées-Atlantiques) and died in Aix-en-Provence (Bouches-du-Rhône). He was also a law professor, a senior faculty member and President of Paul Cézanne University.

== Bibliography ==
=== Books ===
- Favoreu, Louis; Philip, Loïc [in French] (2005). Le Conseil constitutionnel. Que sais je ? (in French) (7th ed.). Paris: PUF. ISBN 978-2-13-053079-4.
- Favoreu, Louis; Mastor, Wanda (2011). Les cours constitutionnelles. Connaissance du droit (in French). Paris: Dalloz. ISBN 978-2-247-08896-6.
- Favoreu, Louis; Philip, Loïc [in French]; Gaïa, Patrick; Ghevontian, Richard; Mélin-Soucramanien, Ferdinand; Roux, André (2011). Les grandes décisions du Conseil constitutionnel. Grandes décisions (in French) (16th ed.). Paris: Dalloz. ISBN 978-2-247-10657-8.
- Favoreu, Louis; Gaïa, Patrick; Ghevontian, Richard; Mestre, Jean-Louis; Pfersmann, Otto; Roux, André; Scoffoni, Guy (2012). Droit constitutionnel. Précis (in French) (14th ed.). Paris: Dalloz. ISBN 978-2-247-10977-7.

=== Articles in journals ===
- Favoreu, Louis (March–April 1991). "De la démocratie à l'État de droit". Le Débat (in French) (64). Paris: Gallimard: 154–158. doi:10.3917/deba.064.0154. ISSN 0246-2346.
- Favoreu, Louis (November 1997). "Légalité et constitutionnalité". Les Cahiers du Conseil constitutionnel (in French) (3). Paris: Dalloz.
- Favoreu, Louis (May 2001). "Sur l'introduction hypothétique du recours individuel direct devant le Conseil constitutionnel". Les Cahiers du Conseil constitutionnel (in French) (10). Paris: Dalloz.
- Favoreu, Louis (December 2001). "Entretien avec M. le doyen Louis Favoreu". Les Cahiers du Conseil constitutionnel (in French) (11). Paris: Dalloz.
- Favoreu, Louis; Roux, André (May 2002). "La libre administration des collectivités territoriales est-elle une liberté fondamentale?". Les Cahiers du Conseil constitutionnel (in French) (12). Paris: Dalloz.
- Maus, Didier (2004). "Louis Favoreu un missionnaire du droit constitutionnel". Revue française de droit constitutionnel (in French) (59). Paris: PUF: 461–463. doi:10.3917/rfdc.059.0461. ISSN 1151-2385.
