= Second Bayeux speech =

1946 speech by General Charles de Gaulle

Second Bayeux Speech
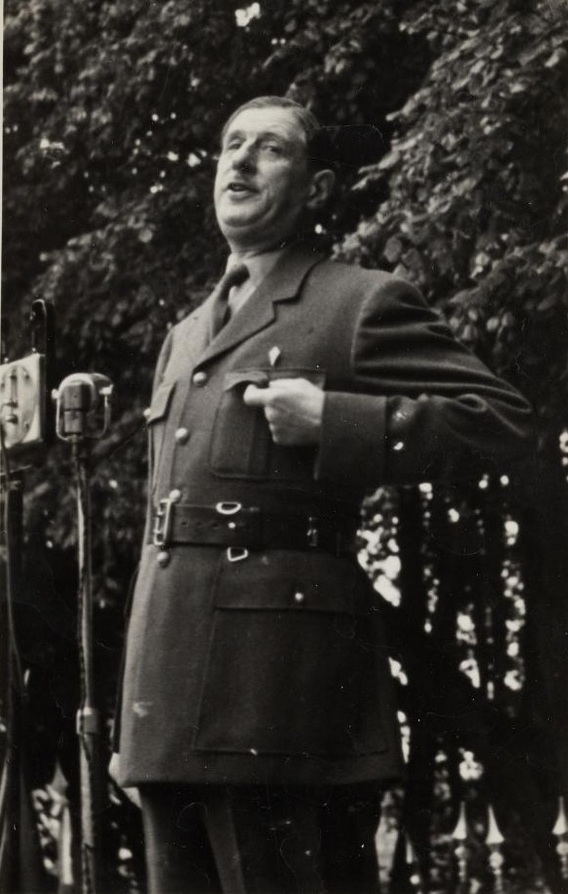
- De Gaulle delivering the speech
- Native name: Discours de Bayeux
- Date: 16 June 1946
- Location: Bayeux, France
- Website: French transcript

The Second Bayeux speech was a speech delivered by General Charles de Gaulle of France in the immediate postwar period on 16 June 1946. It was one of his most important speeches.

Two years after the Normandy landings, symbolically in the first city in continental France liberated by the Allies, where he set foot on French soil in June 1944 and in the wake of the failure to ratify a proposed left wing constitution, de Gaulle gave a speech where he talked about the shape that he wanted the French Constitution to take.

When De Gaulle appeared on the balcony of the town hall in Bayeux, the public greeted him with cries of "Take power!"

De Gaulle advocated a reduction in the power of the parliament, going as far as to say, "It goes without saying that the parliament, which is composed of two chambers and exercises legislative power, cannot be the source of executive power". He said he supported a bicameral parliament with a head of state standing above the parties. In a state of emergency, the head of state would be the guarantor of national independence and the treaties signed by France.

Although mostly ignored in the constitution that was subsequently adopted, the ideas that he put forward in his speech would inspire the 1958 Constitution.
