= French Fourth Republic =

Government of France from 1946 to 1958

French Republic République française
- 1946–1958
- Flag
- Motto: "Liberté, égalité, fraternité" "Liberty, Equality, Fraternity"
- Anthem: "La Marseillaise"
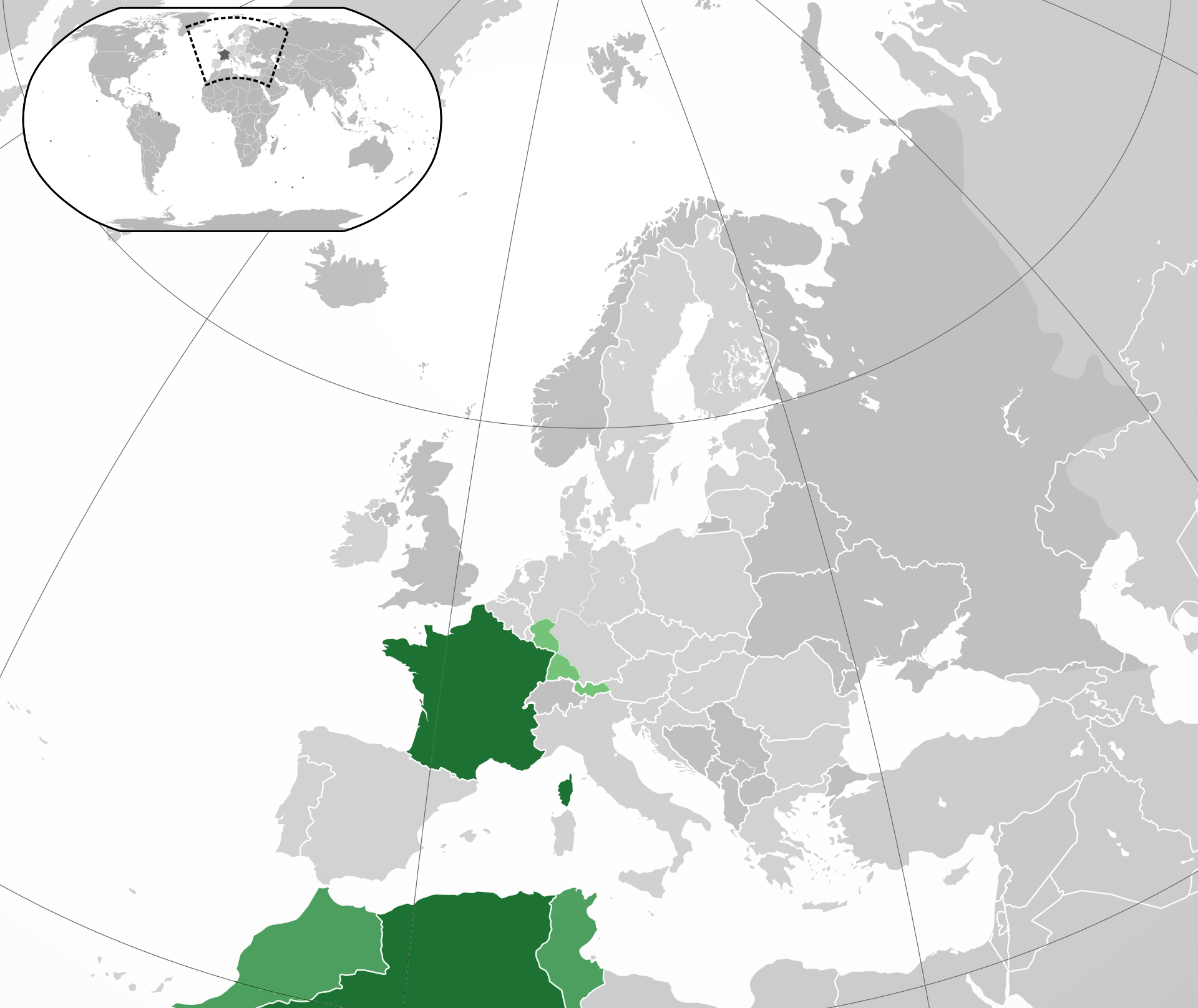
- France; French protectorates of Morocco and Tunisia; French occupation zones in Germany and Austria

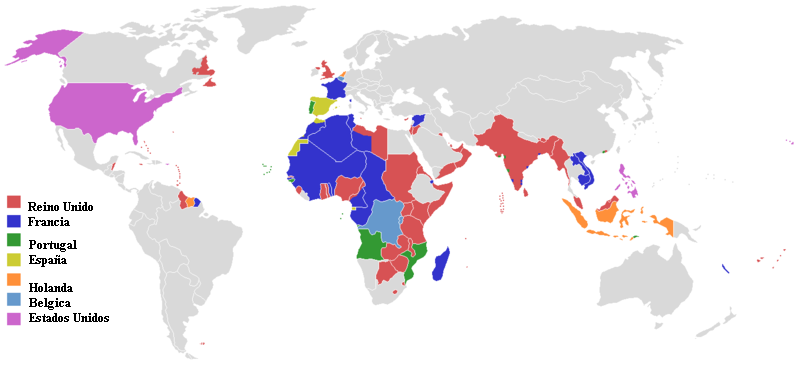
- Colonial empires in 1945. (France shown in blue)
- Capital and largest city: Paris; 48°51′N 2°21′E
- Official language: French
- Religion: Secular state (Note: Excluding Alsace-Moselle) In Alsace-Moselle: Roman Catholicism; Calvinism; Lutheranism; Judaism
- Demonym: French
- Government: Unitary parliamentary republic
- President
  - 1947–1954: Vincent Auriol
  - 1954–1958: René Coty
- Prime Minister
  - 1947 (first): Paul Ramadier
  - 1958 (last before the Algiers putsch): Pierre Pflimlin
  - 1958 (last): Charles de Gaulle
- Legislature: Parliament
  - Upper house: Council of the Republic
  - Lower house: National Assembly
- Historical era: Decolonisation of Africa; Decolonisation of Asia; Cold War
  - Constitutional referendum: 13 October 1946
  - Constitution adopted: 27 October 1946
  - First Indochina War: 19 December 1946
  - Malagasy Uprising: 29 March 1947
  - French intervention in Korea: 29 July 1950 - 27 July 1953
  - Algerian War: 1 November 1954
  - De facto end of French India: 1 November 1954
  - Austrian State Treaty: 15 May 1955
  - Cameroon War: 22 May 1955
  - Saar Treaty: 27 October 1956
  - Suez Crisis: 29 October – 7 November 1956
  - Ifni War: 23 November 1957 – 30 June 1958
  - New constitution adopted: 4 October 1958

Area
- 1946 (including colonies): 14,200,000 km^{2} (5,500,000 sq mi)

Population
  - 1946 (including colonies): 200,000,000
- Currency: French franc; Algerian franc
Preceded by
Provisional Government of the French Republic
French colonial Empire (French Union)
Succeeded by
Provisional Government of the Algerian Republic
French Fifth Republic
French Community
- Today part of: France; Algeria

The French Fourth Republic (French: Quatrième république française) was the republican government of France from 27 October 1946 to 4 October 1958, governed by the fourth republican constitution of 13 October 1946. Essentially a reestablishment and continuation of the French Third Republic which governed from 1870 during the Franco-Prussian War to 1940 during World War II, it suffered many of the same problems which led to its end. The French Fourth Republic was a parliamentary republic.

Despite political dysfunction, the Fourth Republic saw an era of great economic growth in France and the rebuilding of the nation's social institutions and industry after World War II, with assistance from the United States through the Marshall Plan. It also saw the beginning of the rapprochement with France's longtime enemy Germany, which led to Franco-German co-operation and eventually to the European Union.

The new constitution made some attempts to strengthen the executive branch of government to prevent the unstable situation before the war, but instability remained and the French Fourth Republic saw frequent changes of government – there were 21 administrations in its 12-year history. Moreover, the government proved unable to make effective decisions regarding decolonization of the numerous remaining French colonies. After a series of crises culminating in the Algerian crisis of 1958, the French Fourth Republic collapsed. Wartime leader Charles de Gaulle returned from retirement to preside over a transitional administration empowered to design a new French constitution. The Fourth Republic was dissolved on 5 October 1958 following a public referendum which established the current French Fifth Republic with a strengthened presidency.

== Founding of the Fourth Republic ==
After the liberation of France in 1944, the Vichy government was dissolved and the Provisional Government of the French Republic (French: Gouvernement provisoire de la République française, GPRF), also known as the French Committee of National Liberation, was instituted after a unanimous request of the Provisional Consultative Assembly to be properly represented. With most of the political class discredited and containing many members who had more or less collaborated with Nazi Germany, Gaullism and communism became the most popular political forces in France.

Charles de Gaulle led the GPRF from 1944 to 1946. Meanwhile, negotiations took place over the proposed new constitution, which was to be put to a referendum. De Gaulle advocated a presidential system of government, and criticized the reinstatement of what he pejoratively called "the parties system". He resigned in January 1946 and was replaced by Felix Gouin of the French Section of the Workers' International (Section française de l'Internationale ouvrière, SFIO). Ultimately only the French Communist Party (Parti communiste français, PCF) and the socialist SFIO supported the draft constitution, which envisaged a form of government based on unicameralism; but this was rejected in the referendum of 5 May 1946.

For the 1946 elections, the Rally of Left Republicans (Rassemblement des gauches républicaines, RGR), which encompassed the Radical-Socialist Party, the Democratic and Socialist Union of the Resistance and other conservative parties, unsuccessfully attempted to oppose the Christian democrat and socialist MRP–SFIO–PCF alliance. The new constituent assembly included 166 MRP deputies, 153 PCF deputies and 128 SFIO deputies, giving the tripartite alliance an absolute majority. Georges Bidault of the MRP replaced Felix Gouin as the head of government.

A new draft of the Constitution was written, which this time proposed the establishment of a bicameral form of government. Leon Blum of the SFIO headed the GPRF from 1946 to 1947. After a new legislative election in June 1946, the Christian democrat Georges Bidault assumed leadership of the Cabinet. Despite De Gaulle's so-called discourse of Bayeux of 16 June 1946 in which he denounced the new institutions, the new draft was approved by 53% of voters voting in favor (with an abstention rate of 31%) in the referendum held on 13 October 1946 and the Constitution of 27 October 1946 came into force two weeks later (Note: The question of the legal effective date of the Constitution is debated. It was adopted by the National Constituent Assembly on 29 September 1946, approved by referendum 13 October, promulgated by Georges Bidault, President of the Provisional Government on 27 October, and published in the Journal officiel de la République française the next day. Some, like Louis Favoreu, say it became effective "in successive stages" ("par paliers"); others, adhering to article 98, section 2 of the Constitution, say it became effective on 24 December 1946, the date of the first Council of the Republic.) as the Fourth Republic, in an arrangement in which executive power essentially resided in the hands of the President of the Council (the prime minister). The President of the Republic was given a largely symbolic role, although he remained chief of the French Army and as a last resort could be called upon to resolve conflicts.

After the expulsion of the Communists from the governing coalition, France joined the Cold War against communism, as expressed by becoming a founding member of NATO in April 1949. France now took a leadership position in unifying western Europe, working closely with Konrad Adenauer of West Germany. Robert Schuman, who was twice Prime Minister and at other times Minister of Finance and Foreign Minister, was instrumental in building post-war European and trans-Atlantic institutions. A devout Catholic and anti-Communist, he led France to be a member of the European Communities, the Council of Europe and NATO.

== Trente Glorieuses ==
Les Trente Glorieuses ('The Glorious Thirty') was the high prosperity in the 30 years from 1945 to 1975. In 1944, De Gaulle introduced a dirigiste economic policy, which included substantial state control over a capitalist economy, which was followed by 30 years of unprecedented growth.

The wartime damage was extensive, and large reparations from defeated Germany did not happen. The United States helped revive the French economy with the Marshall Plan (1948–1951), giving France $2.3 billion with no repayment. France was the second largest recipient after Britain. The total of all American grants and credits to France from 1946 to 1953 amounted to $4.9 billion. It provided urgently needed funding for modernizing transport systems, electricity generation, and basic industries including cement, coal, and steel. The plan required a modernization of French industrial and managerial systems, free trade, and friendly economic relations with West Germany.

The French economy grew rapidly like economies of other developed countries within the framework of the Marshall Plan such as West Germany, Italy, and Japan. These decades of economic prosperity combined high productivity with high average wages and high consumption, and were also characterised by a highly developed system of social benefits. According to various studies, the real purchasing power of the average French worker's salary went up by 170% between 1950 and 1975, while overall private consumption increased by 174% in the period 1950-1974. The French standard of living, which had been damaged by both World Wars, became one of the world's highest. The population also became far more urbanized; many rural départements experienced a population decline while the larger metropolitan areas grew considerably, especially that of Paris. Ownership of various household goods and amenities increased considerably, while the wages of the French working class rose significantly as the economy became more prosperous. As noted by the historians Jean Blondel and Donald Geoffrey Charlton in 1974,

If it is still the case that France lags in the number of its telephones, working-class housing has improved beyond recognition and the various 'gadgets' of the consumer society–from television to motor cars–are now purchased by the working class on an even more avid basis than in other Western European countries.

The worldwide 1973 oil crisis slowed down its explosive growth. Thus, the mid-1970s marked the end of the period. Thomas Piketty describes the Trente Glorieuses as an exceptional "catch up" period following the world wars. He cites statistics showing that normal growth in wealthy countries is about 1.5–2%, whereas in Europe growth dropped to 0.5% between 1913 and 1950, and then "caught up" with a growth rate of 4% between 1950 and 1970, until settling back to 1.5–2% from 1970 onward.

== Indochina and Tunisia ==
Public opinion polls showed that in February 1954, only 7% of the French people wanted to continue the fight in Indochina against the Communists, led by Ho Chi Minh and his Viet Minh movement.

Pierre Mendès France was a Radical Party leader who was Prime Minister for eight months in 1954–55, working with the support of the Socialist and Communist parties. His top priority was ending the war in Indochina, which had already cost 92,000 dead, 114,000 wounded and 28,000 captured in the wake of the humiliating defeat at the Battle of Dien Bien Phu in early May 1954.

At the Geneva Conference (1954), he made a deal that gave the Viet Minh control of Vietnam north of the 17th parallel, and allowed him to pull out all French forces. That left South Vietnam standing alone. However, the United States moved in and provided large-scale financial, military and economic support for South Vietnam.

Mendès France next came to an agreement with Habib Bourguiba, the nationalist leader in Tunisia, for the independence of that colony by 1956, and began discussions with the nationalist leaders in Morocco for a French withdrawal.

== Failure of the new parliamentary system ==
Julian T. Jackson wrote, "the France of the Fourth Republic owed a great deal to men disappointed in Vichy" after having participated in that government, such as François Perroux, François Gravier, and Hubert Beuve-Méry. The intention of the new Constitution's authors was to rationalize the parliamentary system. Ministers were accountable to the legislative body, the French National Assembly, but some measures were introduced in order to protect the Cabinet and to reinforce the authority of the Prime Minister of France, who led the Cabinet. The goal of the new constitution was to reconcile parliamentary democracy with ministerial stability.

For instance, under the new Constitution, the President of the Council was the leader of the executive branch (Prime Minister of France). The President of the French Republic, elected by the Parliament (the National Assembly and the Council of the Republic), played a symbolic role. His main power was to propose a Prime Minister, who was subject to election by the National Assembly before forming a Cabinet. Only the Prime Minister could invoke a parliamentary vote on legitimacy of the Cabinet. The Prime Minister was also the only member of the executive able to demand a vote of confidence from the National Assembly (in the Third Republic any minister could call for a vote of confidence). The Cabinet could be dismissed if an absolute majority of the National Assembly's members voted against the Cabinet. Finally, the National Assembly could be dissolved after two ministerial crises in the legislature.

However, these constitutional measures did not work. In January 1947, after his election by the National Assembly and the nomination of his ministers, Prime Minister Paul Ramadier called for a vote of confidence in order to verify that the Assembly approved the composition of his Cabinet. This initiated a custom of double election, a vote for the Prime Minister followed by a vote of confidence in the chosen Cabinet, that weakened the Prime Minister's authority over the Cabinet. Cabinets were dismissed with only a plurality (not the absolute majority) of the National Assembly voting against the Cabinet. Consequently, these ministerial crises did not result in the dissolution of Parliament. Thus, as in the Third Republic, this regime was characterized by ministerial instability.

The Fourth Republic was also a victim of the political context. The split of the three-party alliance in spring 1947, the departure of Communist ministers, Gaullist opposition, and the new proportional representation did not create conditions for ministerial stability. Governmental coalitions were composed of an undisciplined patchwork of center-left and center-right parties. Finally, the Fourth Republic was confronted with the collapse of the French colonial empire.

== European countries ==
The creation of the European Coal and Steel Community (ECSC) was first proposed by French foreign minister Robert Schuman and French economist Jean Monnet on 9 May 1950 as a way to prevent further war between France and Germany. Though the United Kingdom was invited, its Labour government, then preparing for a re-election fight, did not join the initiative. It was formally established in 1951 by the Treaty of Paris, signed by France, Italy, West Germany, Belgium, Luxembourg and the Netherlands. Between these countries the ECSC would create a common market for coal and steel. The ECSC was governed by a 'High Authority', checked by bodies representing governments; representatives of the peoples of the member States (selected from each state's Members of Parliament); and an independent judiciary.

The 1951 Treaty of Paris, which created the ECSC, was superseded on 25 March 1957 by the Treaty of Rome, which established the European Economic Community (the forerunner to the European Union, created in 1993 through the Maastricht Treaty).

== Algeria and collapse ==
The Algiers crisis of 1958 triggered the collapse of the Fourth Republic. France was still a colonial power, although conflict and revolt had begun the process of decolonization. French West Africa, French Indochina, and French Algeria still sent representatives to the French parliament under systems of limited suffrage in the French Union. Algeria in particular, despite being the colony with the largest French-identifying population, saw rising pressure for separation from the Métropole. The situation was complicated by people in Algeria, such as the Pieds-Noirs, who wanted to stay part of France, so the Algerian War became not just a separatist movement but had elements of a civil war.

Further complications came when a section of the French Army rebelled and openly backed the Algérie française movement to defeat separation. Revolts and riots broke out in May 1958 against the French government in Algiers, but there were no adequate and competent political initiatives by the French government in support of military efforts to end the rebellion owing to party politics. The feeling was widespread that another debacle like that in Indochina in 1954 was in the offing and that the government would order another precipitous pullout and sacrifice French honour to political expediency. This prompted General Jacques Massu to set up a French settlers' committee to demand the formation of a new national government under General de Gaulle, who was a national hero and had advocated a strong military policy, nationalism and the retention of French control over Algeria. General Massu, who had gained prominence and authority when he ruthlessly suppressed Algerian militants, famously declared that unless General De Gaulle was returned to power, the French Army would openly revolt; General Massu and other senior generals covertly planned the takeover of Paris with 1,500 paratroopers preparing to take over airports with the support of French Air Force units. Armoured units from Rambouillet prepared to roll into Paris.

On 24 May, French paratroopers from the Algerian corps landed on Corsica, taking the French island in a bloodless action called Opération Corse. Operation Resurrection would be implemented if De Gaulle was not approved as leader by the French Parliament, if De Gaulle asked for military assistance to take power, or to thwart any organized attempt by the French Communist Party to seize power or stall De Gaulle's return.

De Gaulle, who had announced his retirement from politics a decade before, placed himself in the midst of the crisis, calling on the nation to suspend the government and create a new constitutional system. On 29 May 1958, French politicians agreed upon calling on De Gaulle to take over the government as prime minister. The French Army's willingness to support an overthrow of the constitutional government was a significant development in French politics. With Army support, De Gaulle's government terminated the Fourth Republic (the last parliament of the Fourth Republic voted for its dissolution) and drew up a new constitution proclaiming the French Fifth Republic in 1958.

== See also ==
- French Constitution of 27 October 1946
