= Fundamental laws of the Kingdom of France =

Grand Royal Coat of Arms of the Kingdom of France

The fundamental laws of the Kingdom of France were a set of unwritten principles which dealt with determining the question of royal succession, and placed limits on the otherwise absolute power of the king from the Middle Ages until the French Revolution in 1789. They were based on customary usage and religious beliefs about the roles of God, monarch, and subjects.

== Terminology ==
Although discussion of the concepts surrounding the idea of fundamental laws which organize the body politic go back to the earliest period of the French monarchy, the expression "fundamental laws" (lois fondamentales) itself didn't come into use until the second half of the 16th century, even though the theories underlying it were fully mature by that point.

The Parliament of Paris as late as 1788 listed a number of rights that it considered fundamental, including that of the ruling house to the throne of France, but also those of the ordinary citizen to never be brought for any matter before judges other than those designated by law, and never to be arrested without being brought before a competent legal authority. (Note: "The right of every citizen never to be brought before any judge other than his natural judges, who are those designated by law; And the right, without which all the others are useless, of not being arrested, by any order whatsoever, except to be handed over without delay into the hands of judges of appropriate jurisdiction." "Le droit de chaque citoyen de n'être jamais traduit en aucune matière devant d'autres juges que ses juges naturels, qui sont ceux que la loi lui désigne; Et le droit, sans lequel tous les autres sont inutiles, celui de n'être arrêté, par quelque ordre que ce soit, que pour être remis sans délai entre les mains des juges compétents."(Maury 1998.))

== Salic law ==
Early writers in the 9th to the 16th century, such as Smaragdus of Saint-Mihiel, Jonas of Orléans and Hincmar of Reims, saw the king as the embodiment of divine justice, from which he drew his authority.

Salic law was the ancient Frankish civil law code compiled around 500 AD by the first Frankish King, Clovis. Roman Law was written with the assistance of Gallo-Romans to reflect the Salic legal tradition and Christianity, while containing much from the Roman tradition. The text lists various crimes and the fines associated with them. It remained the basis of Frankish law throughout the early Medieval period, and influenced future European legal systems.

The best known tenet of Salic law was the exclusion of women from inheriting thrones, fiefs, or other property. The Salic laws were arbitrated by a committee appointed and empowered by the King of the Franks. Dozens of manuscripts dating from the sixth to eighth centuries and three emendations as late as the ninth century have survived. Its use of agnatic succession governed royal succession in the kingdoms of France and Italy.

== Religious limits to power ==
The absolute monarchy in the kingdom was not the same as totalitarian dictatorship for example, and there were limits on the king's power. These arose chiefly from religious constraints: because the monarchy was considered to be established by divine right, that is, that the king was chosen by God to carry out his will, this implied that the king's subjects should obey and respect him. The king is accountable only to God, but this meant an implicit demand of virtue. There was also a limitation on new taxes that the state could impose only with consent of the Estates General, as well as some limits of the Parlement of Paris.

== Key themes ==
While ancient France did not have a constitution in the formal sense (written document containing constitutional rules), it had already developed a constitution in the material sense (organization of power) in the Middle Ages.

The fundamental laws can be grouped into four key themes:

- customary heredity, (Note: In law, a custom is a usage held to be obligatory by the social order, as if it were the result of a law. It is formed by the accumulation of precedents.) imposed through coronation, which replaced election of the king,
- masculinity (of the sovereign),
- the gradual distinction between King and State, reflected in the unavailability of the crown and its corollary, the inalienability of the estate,
- the king's Catholicism, expressly affirmed from the 16th century on; this as a consequence of the Wars of Religion.

In addition, there was also:

- the prohibition on giving away or selling part of the kingdom,
- respect for social hierarchies and the pre-eminence of the clergy.

== Evolution and demise ==
Towards the end of the Middle Ages, the monarchy was evolving in the direction of absolutism, placing the king above the law, according to the political ideas of Jean Bodin and his "Six Books of the Republic" of 1576. This implied that with regard to governmental powers, the king makes the laws, the king executes the laws through his ministers and officers, and the king delegates his judiciary power to independent magistrates who handle appeals; nevertheless, the king retains the right to detain anyone of his choice by a lettre de cachet.

Despite this evolution and Bodin's theories, the power of the king remained strictly controlled by traditional institutions, like parliaments, and provincial, parish, and clergy groups, and local customs. Thus, for example, when Louis XIV revoked the Edict of Nantes in 1685, he was acting in response to his entourage, his court, and influential men in the kingdom. The absolute monarchy came to an end in 1789 with the French Revolution.

== See also ==
- Absolute primogeniture
- Cognatic succession
- Constitution
- Coronation of the French monarch
- Dynasty
- Elective monarchy
- French Wars of Religion
- Hereditary monarchy
- History of France
- Hundred Years War
- Kingdom of France
- Law of France
- Lit de justice
- Parliament of Paris
- Tanistry

== Works cited ==
- Bouscau, Franck (1 October 2011). "Les lois fondamentales du Royaume de France : genèse de l'institution royale" [The Fundamental Laws of the Kingdom of France: genesis of the royal institution]. Vive le Roy (in French).
- Dignat, Alban (27 May 2021). Grégor, Isabelle (ed.). "XVI)Ie siècle : Absolutisme et monarchie en France" [17th century: Absolutism and Monarchy in France]. Herodote.net (in French). Herodote.net SAS.
- Drew, Katherine Fischer (1991). The laws of the Salian Franks (Pactus legis Salicae). Philadelphia: University of Pennsylvania Press. ISBN 0-8122-8256-6. /.
- Lemaire, André (1907). Les lois fondamentales de la monarchie française d'après les théoriciens de l'ancien régime [The fundamental laws of the French monarchy according to the theorists of the ancien régime] (dissertation). Bibliothèque des Ecoles françaises d'Athènes et de Rome. Paris: Albert Fontemoing. OCLC 1039742074. Archived from the original on 2022-12-30.
- Maury, Jean-Pierre (1998). "Lois fondamentales du Royaume Déclaration du parlement de Paris 3 mai 1788" [Fundamental laws of the Kingdom Declaration of the Parliament of Paris May 3, 1788]. Digithèque MJP. University of Perpignan.
