= French Constitutional Law of 1940 =

Law making a Nazi German client state

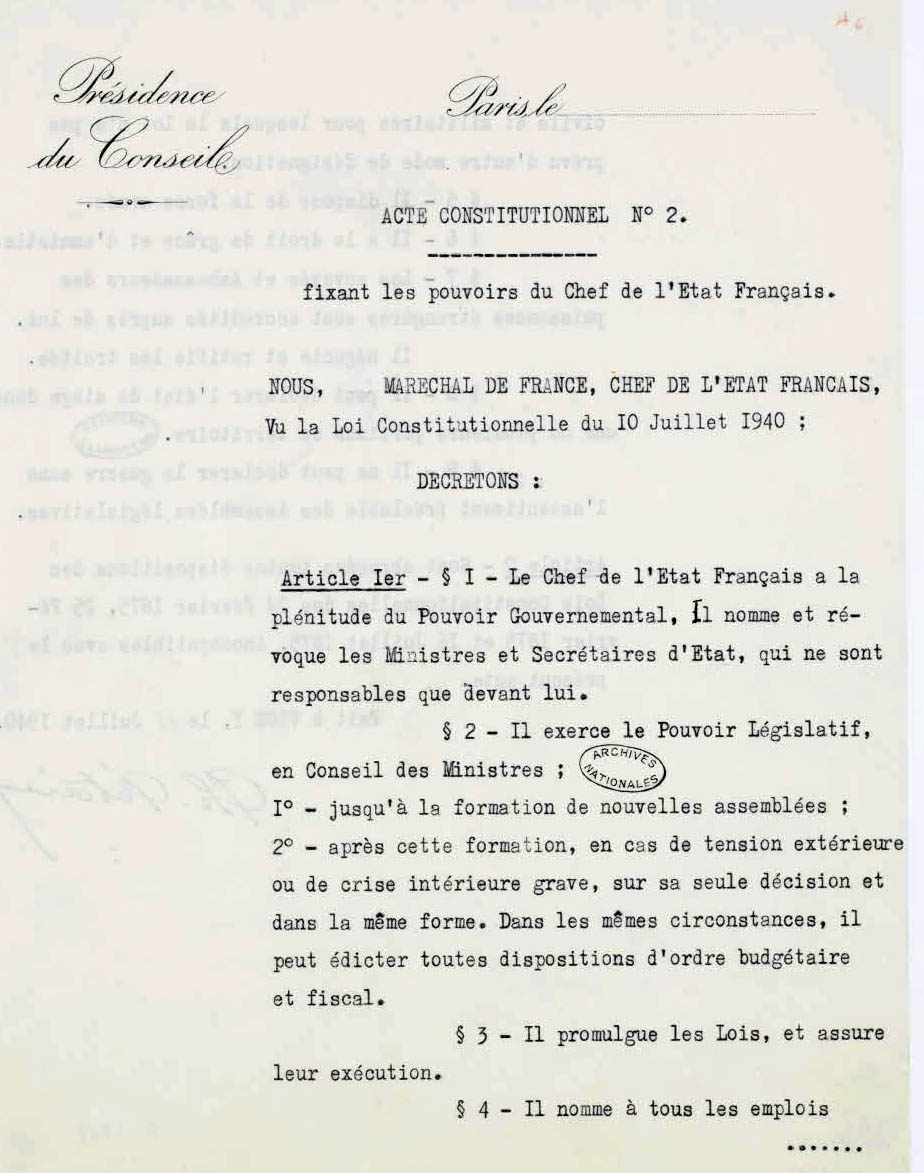
- Act number 2; front

French National Assembly, Third Republic
- Long title: Loi constitutionnelle du 10 juillet 1940
- Territorial extent: France, and its colonial empire
- Enacted by: French National Assembly, Third Republic
- Enacted: 9 July 1940
- Signed by: Philippe Pétain
- Signed: 9 July 1940
- Effective: 10 July 1940
- Repealed: 9 August 1944

Repealed by
- Ordinance of 9 August 1944

Summary
- dissolved Third Republic; established regime of Vichy France
- Status: Void ab initio

The French Constitutional Law of 1940 is a set of bills that were voted into law on 10 July 1940 by the National Assembly, which comprised both the Senate and the Chamber of Deputies during the French Third Republic. The law established the Vichy regime and passed with 569 votes to 80, with 20 abstentions. The group of 80 parliamentarians who voted against it are known as the Vichy 80. The law gave all the government powers to Philippe Pétain, and further authorized him to take all necessary measures to write a new constitution. Pétain interpreted this as de facto suspending the French Constitutional Laws of 1875 which established the Third Republic, even though the law did not explicitly suspend it, but only granted him the power to write a new constitution. The next day, by Act No 2, Pétain defined his powers and abrogated all the laws of the Third Republic that were incompatible with them.

Although given full constituent powers by the law, Pétain never promulgated a new constitution. A draft was written in 1941 and signed by Pétain in 1944, but it was never submitted or ratified.

The Ordinance of 9 August 1944 was an ordinance promulgated by the Provisional Government of the French Republic after D-Day asserting the nullity of the Constitutional Law of 1940 and other classes of law passed later by Vichy. The Constitution of 1940 was not repealed or annulled but rather declared void ab initio.

== Application ==
On the basis of this act, Marshal Pétain progressively instituted a new regime through a dozen constitutional acts issued between 1940 and 1942. However, a new Constitution was never declared. In positive law, although these acts put a de facto end to the Third Republic, the act of July 10, 1940, as well as all the constitutional acts taken in its application, were declared null and void in 1944.

== Timeline of French constitutions ==

Dark blue: Strong executive powers, authoritarian.

Purple: Relative balance between executive and legislative.

Red: Strong legislative powers, all-powerful assembly(ies).

Gray: No checks and balances.

== See also ==
- Constitutional Council (France)
- French constitutional laws of 1875
- Constitutional law of 2 November 1945
- Tréveneuc law
- Enabling Act of 1933 (a similar law which amended the constitution to grant absolute authority to the government, whose passing heralded the end of the Weimar Republic)

== Bibliography ==
- Derfler, Leslie (1966). The Third French Republic, 1870-1940. France: Van Nostrand. ISBN 0-89874-480-6.
- Paxton, Robert (1975). Vichy France. United States: W. W. Norton & Company. ISBN 0-39300-794-4.
