= Constitution of France =

Constitution of the French Republic
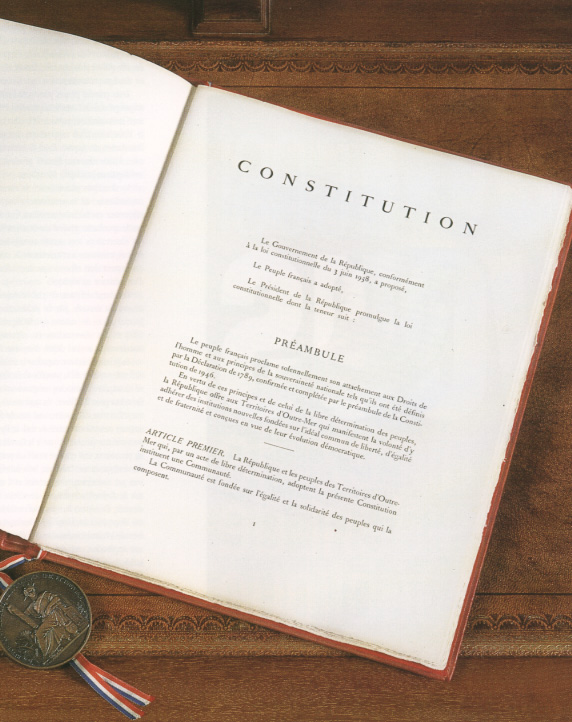
- Constitution of France's Fifth Republic (1958), sealed with the Great Seal of France.

Overview
- Original title: (in French) Constitution française du 4 octobre 1958
- Jurisdiction: France
- Ratified: 28 September 1958; 68 years ago
- Date effective: 4 October 1958; 68 years ago
- System: Unitary semi-presidential republic

Government structure
- Branches: Three (executive, legislative and judiciary)
- Chambers: Two (Senate and National Assembly)
- Executive: President-led Council of Ministers responsible to the National Assembly; Prime minister as head of government
- Judiciary: High Court is established for presidential Impeachment purposes; an extra-judicial body, the Constitutional Council, reviews the constitutionality of laws; no other part of the court system is referenced.
- Federalism: Unitary
- Electoral college: No, but senate elections mandated to be indirect
- Last amended: 2024
- Supersedes: French Constitution of 1946

Full text
- Constitution of the Fifth French Republic at Wikisource

Wikisource
- Constitution of the Fifth French Republic (unamended)

The current Constitution of France was adopted on 4 October 1958. It is typically called the Constitution of the Fifth Republic (French: la Constitution de la Cinquième République), and it replaced the Constitution of the Fourth Republic of 1946, keeping its preamble. The current Constitution regards the separation of church and state, democracy, social welfare, and indivisibility as core principles of the French state.

Charles de Gaulle was the main driving force in introducing the new constitution and inaugurating the Fifth Republic, while the text was drafted by Michel Debré. The constitution was adopted by referendum on 28 September 1958. Since then, the constitution has been amended twenty-five times, notably in 2008 and most recently in 2024.

== Provisions ==
=== Preamble ===
The preamble of the Constitution recalls both the Declaration of the Rights of Man and of the Citizen of 1789, as well as the preamble of the Constitution of the Fourth Republic of 1946, which created at the time new constitutional rights for French citizens, including social and economic rights.

The preamble of the Constitution also establishes France as a secular and democratic country, deriving its sovereignty from the people.

Since a constitutional revision in 2005, the preamble includes the ten articles of the Charter for the Environment.

=== Government institutions and practices ===
The French Constitution established a semi-presidential system of government, with two competing readings. In one reading, the executive branch has both a president of the republic and a prime minister, as is commonly seen in parliamentary systems with a symbolic president and a prime minister who directs the government. This reading is supported by Articles 5 and 21 of the Constitution, which respectively state that the president is a guardian of the state and of the Constitution, while the prime minister has the power to decide on the government's actions and policies.

In the other reading, the parliament is very weak for a parliamentary system. The parliament has a limited legislative competence: article 34 of the Constitution lists domains exclusive to parliamentary legislation, but the remaining domains are left to the executive's regulations. The president also has the crucial powers to call a referendum and to dissolve the National Assembly. While the parliament may pass a vote of no confidence in the government, so that the government has to resign, this has been rare, happening in 1962 and on 4 December 2024.

Charles de Gaulle, the first president of the Fifth Republic, was instrumental in the adoption of the new constitution, as he was called back from retirement and narrowly avoided a coup resulting from the Algerian War. De Gaulle always supported the second interpretation of the constitution, in favor of a powerful president. The first socialist president, François Mitterrand, elected in 1981, also supported this interpretation.

Beginning in 1986, elections have from time to time resulted in parliaments with a majority that did not support the president. Such periods are known in France as cohabitation, where a president appoints a prime minister from the new parliamentary majority. During cohabitation, besides powers reserved to the president by the Constitution, all other government powers would be exercised by the prime minister. In 2000, the Constitution was amended by shortening the president's term of office from seven years to five, to coincide with the term of parliament. The amendment means that the presidential election would take place around the parliamentary election, making it more likely to have winners who agree with one another and make cohabitation less likely.

The Constitution provides for the election of the president and the parliament, the selection of the government, the powers of each and the relations between them. It ensures judicial authority and creates a High Court (a never-as-yet-convened court for trying the government), a Constitutional Council (an innovation of the Fifth Republic), and an Economic and Social Council.

=== Shared lawmaking power ===
A unique feature of the Constitution of the Fifth Republic is that it establishes a shared law-making power between two branches of government: the legislative branch, where such powers resided in previous constitutions; and the executive branch, headed by the president and the prime minister appointed by the president.

Parliament has the fundamental responsibility for passing legislation in the Fifth Republic. There are two Houses of Parliament: the National Assembly and the Senate. The Assembly is directly elected, and the more important, and has primary power in passing legislation; the Senate can delay legislation, but not ultimately block it.

Traditionally, the prime minister is the executive branch's liaison with the parliament; Article 49 says they must pledge this role. This is weaker than the constitutions of the Third or Fourth republics, where the government could not be installed until the parliament had received the pledge from the prime minister.

The unique aspect in the Fifth Republic is in Article 21, where the prime minister has power to make legislation. In another unique feature in Article 38, the Parliament can temporarily delegate a portion of its constitutional law-making power to the government to enable rapid consummation of urgent legislation, by passing an enabling law of legislative delegation called a loi d'habilitation ("enabling law").

According to Article 38, a loi d'habilitation may be issued by the parliament upon request of the government to temporarily delegate the parliament's constitutional law-making power to the government in a specifically defined subject area and for a specific length of time. While in effect, Parliament is blocked from issuing statutes in that area, and the government is permitted to draw up ordonnances that normally would be beyond their remit. The ordonnance comes into effect immediately, but must be ratified by Parliament before the end of the period or it expires. Until ratification, the ordonnance has the same status as a réglement (regulation), and can therefore be challenged by the Council of State; but after ratification, it takes on the same status as a statute (loi), and can no longer be challenged. In practice, there have been 23 such lois d'habilitation from 1960 to 1990, with effective periods from one month to three and a half years, resulting in 150 ordonnances. About a third of them were subsequently ratified by Parliament. The loi d'habilitation is a new constitutional feature, not present in earlier constitutions.

Power sharing was unique in being part of the constitution in the Fifth Republic, but the practice was not recent.

The determination that the parliament has responsibility for the law goes back to article 6 of the Declaration of the Rights of Man of 1789, and the role of the executive branch was only to execute it. In theory, the parliament would specify general laws, and the executive could only make regulations about how to apply the laws to day-to-day situations. In practice, this turned out differently, as the parliament on its own initiative sometimes passed acts delegating to the executive the right to alter or void acts of parliament, called décrets-lois. This practice slowly found its way into the Constitution.

Although Article 1 of the Third Republic's Constitutional Act of 25 February 1874 explicitly forbade the parliament to delegate its responsibility, within five years this was ignored and had occurred several times. In 1939, in the run-up to the Second World War, Parliament gave the government power to enact decrees to protect the country. This practice became entrenched after the war, despite the fact that Article 13 of the 1946 Constitution of the newly founded Fourth Republic expressly forbade it. (Note: "The National Assembly alone votes Statutes. It cannot delegate this power." —French Constitution of 27 October 1946, Article 13.) Part of the reason for this, was a lot of squabbling among numerous small political parties in the parliament, who were unable to agree on anything and were ineffective in passing legislation. This became especially problematic in the 1950s, as the crisis in Algeria began to heat up, and the parliament was unable to deal with it. Charles de Gaulle, a private citizen at the time, conceived that the way out was to have a more powerful executive and a weaker parliament; when he was finally invited to form a new government in 1958 and write a constitution, his ideas were incorporated into the Constitution of the Fifth Republic, including the legislative power-sharing defined in Articles 21 and 38.

In the original version of Article 37, everything that was not reserved to the legislative domain in the article was of a regulatory character (i.e., under control of the executive branch), although that clause was removed later. Since 1982, the legislative domain expanded, and since the landmark 1971 decision of the Constitutional Council, additional sources were defined as part of the constitutional block, such as the 1789 Declaration of the Rights of Man and the 1946 constitutional preamble, which were henceforth part of the legislative domain, and after further reforms in 1996, the legislative domain has more power than was originally thought in 1958.

=== Treaties and the EU ===
It enables the ratification of international treaties and those associated with the European Union. It is unclear whether the wording, especially the reserves of reciprocity, is compatible with European Union law.

=== Amendment ===
The Constitution also sets out methods for its own amendment: either a referendum (article 11) or a parliamentary process with presidential consent. The normal procedure of constitutional amendment is that the amendment must be adopted in identical terms by both houses of parliament and then must be adopted by a simple majority in a referendum or by a three-fifths supermajority of the French Congress, a joint session of both houses of Parliament (article 89).

== Principles ==
=== Judicial review ===
Prior to 1971, though executive, administrative and judicial decisions had to comply with the general principles of law (jurisprudence derived from law and the practice of law in general), there were no such restrictions on legislation. It was assumed that unelected judges and other appointees should not be able to overrule laws voted for by the directly elected French parliament.

=== Constitutional block ===
One of the cornerstones of the Constitution of the French Fifth Republic was the establishment of the Constitutional Council, comprising nine justices, who oversaw the constitutionality of legislation (treaties, statutes, regulations), ensured election and referendum oversight, and arbitrated legislative disputes between the President and National Assembly. This followed a broader trend during post-war Europe to establish specialized judiciary tribunals to serve as a bulwark against unconstitutional legislative activities. However, the Council was quite limited in its power under de Gaulle’s presidency and was only decisive when it erroneously upheld a popular referendum to streamline the popular presidential election via the Constitution. Following de Gaulle’s resignation in 1969, the Council entertained greater judicial power and discretion upon adjudicating in the consequential political crisis. The staunch Gaullist Georges Pompidou was elected as de Gaulle’s replacement. He faced a political crisis when his Prime Minister Jacques Chaban-Delmas pressured the National Assembly into banning the radical Proletarian Left (La gauche prolétarienne) twice, which he deemed a threat to the public order and national security. This led to opposition from the French Senate, whose president appealed to the Constitutional Council.

Consequently, in 1971, the Constitutional Council ruled its landmark decision 71-44 DC, better known as the 1971 Freedom of Association Decision. In such, the Council broke precedent by striking down legislation that allegedly violated the right to freedom of association, thereby fostering the "Constitutional Block." The Block consisted of the 1958 Constitution, explicit standards (Declaration of the Rights of Man and of the Citizen of 1789, the Preamble to the Constitution of the Fourth Republic or 1946 Constitution), and implicit standards (the fundamental principles of the Republic—indivisibility, secularism, democracy, equal opportunity). Thus, according to the Council, the actions taken violated the collective principles of the Constitutional Block. Prior to the 1971 Freedom of Association Decision, the Council could only verify laws under the explicit textual stipulation of the 1958 Constitution. Since the 1971 decision, the Constitutional Court obtained an enhanced role in judicial review by having a broader constitutional basis to review alleged legislative breaches, curbing the goal of Gaullists from 1958 of maintaining a strong executive. Since the ruling, the Constitutional Council has added the 2004 Charter of the Environment to France’s Constitutional Block, demonstrating France’s newfound tenacity in judicial review.

=== Principles of the Republic ===
In the Constitution are written the principles of the French Republic:

- Social welfare, which means that everybody must be able to access free public services and be helped when needed.
- Laïcité, which means that the churches are separated from the State and the freedom from religion is protected.
- Democracy, which means that the Parliament and the Government are elected by the people.
- Indivisibility, which means that the French people are united in a single sovereign country with one language, the French language, and all people are equal.

== Amendments ==
The Constitution, in Article 89, has an amending formula. First, a constitutional bill must be approved by both houses of Parliament. Then, the bill must either be approved by the Congress, a special joint session of both houses, or submitted to a referendum.

In 1962, Charles de Gaulle proposed that the president be elected by direct suffrage. He bypassed the amendment procedure by directly sending a constitutional amendment to referendum (article 11). The Art. 11 procedure was envisioned as a procedure for proposing legislation, including changing the organization of constitutional institutions. The 1962 referendum was approved by 62% of the vote but only 46% of registered voters. The amendment permitted the establishment of a popularly-elected presidency, which would otherwise have been vetoed by the Parliament.

The referendum was highly controversial at the time, but the Constitutional Council ruled that it can only review legislative acts for unconstitutionality, not executive acts; since the referendum was proposed by the executive, it was unreviewable. Since a referendum expressed the will of the sovereign people, the Council ruled that the amendment had been adopted. Some scholars had regarded the amendment as a post hoc manifestation of the constituent power, which is the inherent power of the people to bypass an existing constitution to adopt a new constitution.

Article 11 was used for constitutional changes for the second and final time in 1969, but the "No" prevailed, causing Charles de Gaulle to resign from the presidency.

On 21 July 2008, Parliament passed constitutional reforms championed by President Nicolas Sarkozy by a margin of two votes. The changes, when finalized, introduced a consecutive two-term limit for the presidency, gave Parliament a veto over some presidential appointments, ended government control over Parliament's committee system, allowed Parliament to set its own agenda, allowed the president to address Parliament in-session and ended the president's right of collective pardon. (See French constitutional law of 23 July 2008).

On 4 March 2024, Parliament amended Article 34 in a 780 to 72 vote. This amendment made France, as of passage, the only nation to guarantee the right to an abortion. The amendment describes abortion as a "guaranteed freedom"; while Yugoslavia included similar measures in 1974 guaranteeing the right to "decide on having children", the French amendment is the first to explicitly guarantee abortion.

== See also ==
- Article 49 of the French Constitution
- Constitutionalism
- French Constitutional Council
- Constitutional economics
- Fifth Republic (France)
- French Community, which succeeded the French Union
- Government of France
- Politics of France
- Parliamentary immunity in France
- General principles of French law
- De Gaulle's 1946 Bayeux speech, in which he outlined his vision of the constitution
- Article 2 of the Constitution of the Fifth French Republic

== Notes and references ==
Notes

Citations

Works cited

- Dickson, Brice; Hübner, Ulrich (1994). Introduction to French law. London: Pitman. ISBN 9780273601401. OCLC 3479836.
- Elliott, Catherine; Jeanpierre, Eric; Vernon, Catherine (2006). French Legal System (Second ed.). Harlow, England: Pearson/Longman. ISBN 978-1-4058-1161-3. OCLC 70107160.

Preceded by Constitution of the Fourth Republic	Constitutions of France; Constitution of the Fifth Republic; 1958 - Present	Succeeded by -
