= French constitutional laws of 1875 =

Fundamental laws of France during the Third Republic and Vichy periods (1875–1946)

French Constitutional Laws of 1875
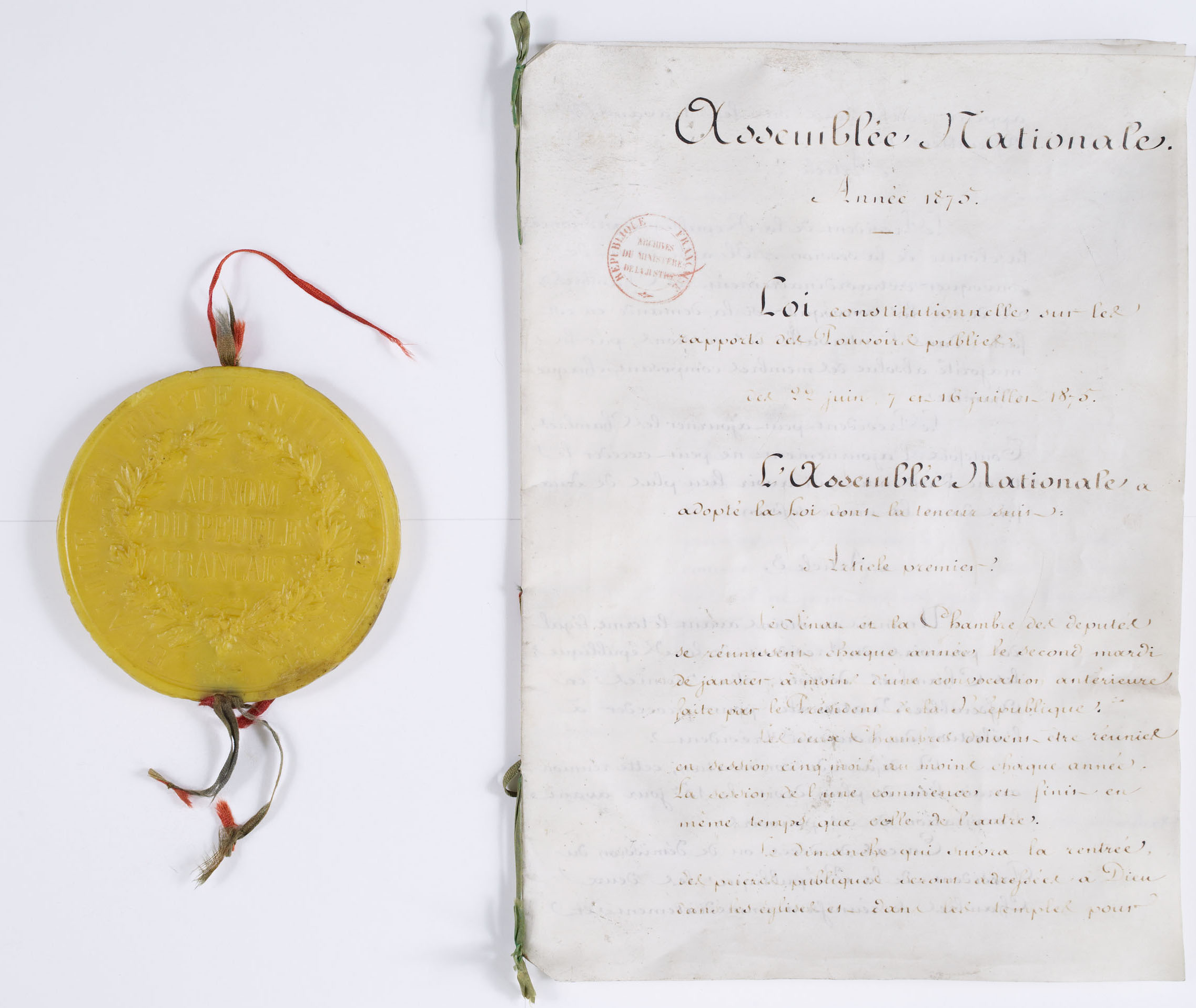
- French Constitutional Laws of 1875.

Overview
- Original title: (in French) Lois constitutionnelles de 1875
- Jurisdiction: France
- Date effective: 1875
- System: Unitary parliamentary republic

Government structure
- Branches: Two (Executive and Legislative)
- Chambers: Bicameral (Senate and Chamber of Deputies)
- Executive: De jure: Dual (President of France and Council of Ministers); De facto: Council of Ministers
- Supersedes: French Constitution of 1852
- Superseded by: French Constitution of 1946

The Constitutional Laws of 1875 were the laws passed in France by the National Assembly between February and July 1875 which established the French Third Republic.

The constitution laws could be roughly divided into three laws:

- The Act of 24 February 1875 – The organization of the Senate
- The Act of 25 February 1875 – The organization of government
- The Act of 16 July 1875 – The relationship between governments

At that time France was not defined or organized by a single written constitution. The situation continued during the Vichy Period, where the French Constitutional Law of 1940, along with Philippe Pétain's "Act No. 2", heavily circumscribed the 1875 laws. The laws were legally revoked only during the promulgation of the French Constitution of 1946.

== Historical context ==
Since the fall of the Second Empire, France had been living under an interim government following the proclamation of the Government of National Defense by Léon Gambetta on 4 September 1870. Several laws were passed by the National Assembly, the unicameral body of the French parliament elected in 1871, to organize the state's provisional institutions:

- decree of 17 February 1871 appointing Adolphe Thiers as "chief of the executive power of the French Republic".
- law of 31 August 1871 known as the "loi Rivet ", appointing Thiers "President of the Republic" and specifying his powers.
- law of 15 February 1872, known as the Tréveneuc law, on the role of the departmental councils in the event of war.
- law of 13 March 1873, known as the "loi de Broglie ", modifying the methods of communication between the President of the Republic and the National Assembly.
- law of 20 November 1873, known as the "loi du septennat", appointing Patrice de Mac Mahon to the presidency of the Republic for seven years.
