= List of members of the first Legislative Yuan =

The members of the first Legislative Yuan were elected in the January 1948 elections. A total of 773 representatives were to be elected, consisting of:

1. 622 representatives from the provinces and municipalities
2. 22 representatives from the Mongolian Leagues
3. 15 Elected representatives from Tibet
4. 6 Elected representatives by various racial groups in frontier regions
5. 19 Elected representatives by Chinese citizens residing abroad
6. 89 representatives of occupational groups

== List of members ==
Constituency			Elected members
Jiangsu (38)	District 1 (5)		Lin Dong • Zhou Houjun • Kwang Pu Chen • Zhou Shaocheng • Yu Xilai
Jiangsu (38)	District 2 (5)		Xu Wentian • Zhang Daoxing • Xue Mingjian • Zong Boxua • Zhang Jiuru • Chen Guiqing (substitute) • Chen Hong (s) • Li Huanzhi (s)
Jiangsu (38)	District 3 (5)		Wang Genzhong • Wu Shaoshu • Yan Xinqi • Zhong Zhaoxiang • Di Ying • Xu Hanhao (s) • Peng Liren (s)
Jiangsu (38)	District 4 (5)		Li Yunliang • Ge Kexin • Chu Jiachang • Feng Zhongping • Xie Chengbing
Jiangsu (38)	District 5 (6)		Han Tong • Zhou Jieren • Zhu Hua • Chen Kanghe • Chen Haicheng • Xiang Jutan • Qiao Yifan (s)
Jiangsu (38)	District 6 (4)		Wang Baoxuan • Niu Jianchu • Xu Quan • Pang Shoufeng
Jiangsu (38)	District 7 (5)		Cao Yinfu • Liu Yunzhao • Wang Zilan • Miao Qiping • Shao Jingren • Zhu Yanfeng (s)
Jiangsu (38)	Women (3)		Der-zheng Wang • Chang Wei-chen • Zhuang Jing • Zhao Shujia (s)
Zhejiang (23)	District 1 (5)		Chen Lifu • Luo Xiatian • Ge Jingen • Yang Yun • Liu Xiangnu • Wu Xianglin (s)
Zhejiang (23)	District 2 (6)		Jin Mingsheng • Chen Cheng • Zhou Zhaotang • Mao Yihu • Yue Shuyou • Zhou Dalie • Li Zuqian (s) • Chen Youmei (s)
Zhejiang (23)	District 3 (5)		Xiao Zheng • Xu Shaodi • Chen Cangzheng • Ni Wen-ya • Hong Ruizhao • Lin Shuyi (s)
Zhejiang (23)	District 4 (5)		Zheng Wenli • Luo Tongsun • Jiang Qingyun • Chen Zhengxiu • Hu Weifan • Jiang Shaomo (s) • Liu Zipeng (s)
Zhejiang (23)	Women (2)		Liu Puren • Qian Ying
Anhui (25)	District 1 (6)		Liu Zhen • Chen Zifeng • Zhang Qingzheng • Lu Futing • Li Yingsheng • Cheng Yuanzhen • Wei Shouyong (s)
Anhui (25)	District 2 (6)		Huang Mengfei • Liu Qirui • Duan Mujie • Fan Yuansheng • Wang Xinmin • She Lingyun • Xia Taosheng (s)
Anhui (25)	District 3 (5)		Zhu Zifan • Xu Junpei • Wang Shaolun • Wang Peiren • Fan Chunyang • Zhu Shilong (s) • Chen Tie (s)
Anhui (25)	District 4 (6)		Shao Hua • Li Yinwu • Wang Dancen • Xu Zhongyue • Ma Jingchang • Xia Futang
Anhui (25)	Women (2)		Ding Chengfang • Tung Tao-yun • Wang Xiurui (s)
Jiangxi (22)	District 1 (6)		Zhan Chunjian • Hu Jiafeng • Cheng Tien-fong • Mei Ju-ao • Wang Zemin • Huang Qing • Zhang Yiqing (s)
Jiangxi (22)	District 2 (6)		Chen Jitang • Wen Qun • Gan Jiaxin • Peng Chunshi • Liu Shi • Peng Zhenhuan
Jiangxi (22)	District 3 (4)		Xing Huatie • He Renhao • Huang Zhenzhong • Wang Youyong • Xie Jianhua (s)
Jiangxi (22)	District 4 (4)		Zhou Yongneng • Tu Gongsui • Luo Yunyan • Jiang Bozhang
Jiangxi (22)	Women (2)		Cheng Xiu • Cheng Xiaofu • Ceng Huaying (s)
Hubei (28)	District 1 (4)		Liu Xianyun • Deng Xiangyu • Qian Yunjie • Jin Shaoxian • Wan Can (s) • Ai Shi (s)
Hubei (28)	District 2 (5)		Xu Yuanquan • Xia Douyin • Liu Wendao • Kong Geng • Hu Qiuyuan • Tao Xisheng (s)
Hubei (28)	District 3 (5)		Huang Jianzhong • Yan Xunfu • Wang Menglin • Yang Yuqing • Tang Rumei • Zhong Pusheng (s) • Hu Chun (s)
Hubei (28)	District 4 (4)		Yu Zheng • Tao Yaojie • Qian Nashui • Qin Zupei
Hubei (28)	District 5 (4)		Yang Yiru • Wang Kaihua • Xi Wende • Cui Xueli
Hubei (28)	District 6 (4)		Luo Gonghua • Rao Fenghuang • Zhang Wenhe • Tian Peng
Hubei (28)	Women (2)		Yeh Hsieh-chin • Chou Min
Hunan (33)	District 1 (7)		Song Yishan • Liu Keshu • Zhu Rusong • Han Zhongshi • Yu Wenjie • Lu Dangping • Tang Ruyan
Hunan (33)	District 2 (5)		Bai Yu • Dai Xiujun • He Xinghan • Yang Youjiong • Mao Fei • Zhao Jiazhuo (s)
Hunan (33)	District 3 (6)		Wang Lihang • Liang Dong • Li Yuyao • Deng Gongxuan • Liao Weifan • Deng Feihuang • Xiao Wenduo (s) • Zhu Youwei (s)
Hunan (33)	District 4 (3)		Zhou Lan • Luo Qilian • Jiang Zhaozhou
Hunan (33)	District 5 (3)		Xiao Zanyu • Mo Xuanyuan • Fu Shucang
Hunan (33)	District 6 (3)		Zhou Tianxian • Xiao Fengwei • Wu Jiayou
Hunan (33)	District 7 (3)		Xu Xiaoyan • Qiu Changwei • Chen Xiaocen • Jiang Gu (s)
Hunan (33)	Women (3)		Tan Tiwu • Tang Kuo-cheng • Huang Chen-hua
Sichuan (53)	District 1 (5)		Li Tianmin • Li Zhuoren • Huang Ao • Zhao Huimo • Mei Shuzeng
Sichuan (53)	District 2 (5)		Yin Jingfu • Wei Tinghe • Huang Yingqian • Tang Zhaoming • Li Gongquan • Du Luqian (s)
Sichuan (53)	District 3 (5)		Tian Songyao • Ceng Kuoqing • Lin Yungen • Shen Zhongyu • Dan Maoxin • Huang Sufang (s)
Sichuan (53)	District 4 (4)		Xu Zhongqi • Yu Fuxu • Liu Hangchen • Xie Weizhe
Sichuan (53)	District 5 (6)		Li Boshen • Xia Zhongshi • Li Yongmao • Shi Huaiqing • Gu Hegao • Peng Xunwu • Yang Gongda (s)
Sichuan (53)	District 6 (5)		Liu Mingyang • Gao Xinya • Wang Zhaorong • Xie Xingqu • Feng Jiabang • Liu Wenzhi (s) • Xu Dachuan (s)
Sichuan (53)	District 7 (5)		Deng Huamin • Feng Junlian • Shi Tiyuan • Ceng Baosen • Pi Dezhong • Ren Heping (s)
Sichuan (53)	District 8 (5)		Li Yadong • Li Chaoxin • Wu Gan • Fei Youjun • Zhao Juxu
Sichuan (53)	District 9 (4)		Kang Tse • Liu Shidu • Du Junheng • Zhu Qiming • Wang Ziye (s)
Sichuan (53)	District 10 (4)		Li Xianwei • Xie Baicheng • Peng Shancheng • Jian Youqiao
Sichuan (53)	Women (5)		Huang Zhiquan • Chao Mao-hua • Deng Jixing • Nie Yanghua • Wang Chunbi • Pi Yi-shu (s) • Yu Xiaoquan (s)
Hebei (31)	District 1 (5)		Zhang Baoshu • Wu Yanhuan • Li Peiji • Zhang Qingyuan • Li Dongyuan • Wang Shuxian (s)
Hebei (31)	District 2 (6)		Zhang Xingzhou • Wang Nanfu • Yu Jimeng • Cui Jingbo • Zhang Zhijiang • Wang Hongshao
Hebei (31)	District 3 (5)		Li He • Hou Shaowen • Lu Yuwen •Zhang Hanshu • Qin Rongjia
Hebei (31)	District 4 (6)		Wang Qijiang • Zhang Xizhi • Ji Youmin • Zhang Guangtao • Ma Huanwen • Chen Jiying
Hebei (31)	District 5 (6)		Wang Bingjun • Han Zhensheng • Wang Yaozhang • Duan Yongqing • Cui Shuqin • Qu Zhisheng
Hebei (31)	Women (3)		Ma Runmin • Wang Tung-chen • Cui Puzhen • Wang Huamin (s)
Shandong (40)	District 1 (5)		Song Xianting • Zhao Gonglu • Meng Yunqiao • Lu Tizeng • Shi Yijiang • Jia Hefu (s)
Shandong (40)	District 2 (5)		Liu Xiaoyi • Zhao Huashu • Li Yuting • Zhang Huiwen • Yan Shifu • Yan Guofu (s)
Shandong (40)	District 3 (5)		Liu Jieping • Fan Yusui • Cai Zisheng • Wang Zhongyu • Bi Puxian
Shandong (40)	District 4 (6)		Liu Zhendong • Ge Qin • Chu Xiangshan • Lin Mingjiu • Liu Zhiping • Mou Shangzhai • Cui Weiwu (s)
Shandong (40)	District 5 (5)		Han Fangzheng • Pan Weifang • Du Guangxun • Zhang Jingyu • Fu Ssu-nien • Xiong Mengbin (s) • Tian Yimin (s)
Shandong (40)	District 6 (5)		Chen Mingyu • Li Hanming • Yu Xincheng • Kong Lingcan • Gong Shunheng
Shandong (40)	District 7 (5)		Li Wenzhai • Zang Yuanjun • Li Hansan • Zhang Liyuan • Song Meicun
Shandong (40)	Women (4)		Tsun-ying Wong • Yang Pao-lin • Lu Yun-chang • Chen Jiujing
Shanxi (16)	District 1 (5)		Wang Zhuxian • Yang Sicheng • Wu Hexuan • Sun Huixi • Wu Shipeng • Ma Muzhai (s) • Ma Jilin (s)
Shanxi (16)	District 2 (5)		Zhao Zhongrong • Liu Jie • Zhang Ziyang • Deng Lihao • Ji Yusi • Zhang Zhizhi (s) • Zhu Dian (s)
Shanxi (16)	District 3 (5)		Xi Shangqian • Deng Hongye • Qiao Pengshu • Yan Tingyang • Xie Ziqing
Shanxi (16)	Women (1)		Liu Muzhen • Fu Jinyuan (s)
Henan (36)	District 1 (5)		Hu Changyi • Zheng Zhenyu • Duan Jianmin • Zhou Shusheng • Shi Zongzhou
Henan (36)	District 2 (6)		Zhang Jinjian • Yang Yifeng • Du Xiyi • Wang Sanzhu • Zhao Zhenzhou • Wang Shengting • Li Hongji (s)
Henan (36)	District 3 (6)		Song Yuanzhong • Zhu Jizhang • Zhang Yusheng (politician) • Xiao Sa • Liu Jingjian • Tian Zhennan
Henan (36)	District 4 (5)		Jian Guansan • Li Yaxian • Zheng Ruogu • Liu Ji • Yi Bojian • Zhang Honglie (s) • Zhang Qipeng (s)
Henan (36)	District 5 (6)		Zhou Tanan • Yao Tingfang • Li Ding • Yang Baodong • Luo Mengce • Wang Rupan
Henan (36)	District 6 (5)		Guo Anyu • Ma Chengfeng • Wang Guangqing • Liu Xiwu • Zhang Chunming
Henan (36)	Women (3)		Zhang Guangren • Fu Yan • Hu Manqi
Shaanxi (13)	District 1 (6)		Zhou Bomin • Guo Jingtang • Pan Lianfang • Zheng Ziyi • Chen Guyuan • Zhang Tingzan • Zhang Tingyong (s) • Wei Xiyan (s)
Shaanxi (13)	District 2 (4)		Liu Chucai • Yu Zhenying • Liu Cifeng • Huang Tong • Yang Lingru (s) • Yang Juetian (s)
Shaanxi (13)	District 3 (2)		Ran Yingu • Ying Erbin
Shaanxi (13)	Women (1)		Wu Yunfang
Gansu (8)	District 1 (2)		Wang Dongzheng • Su Zhenjia
Gansu (8)	District 2 (1)		Duan Zhuo
Gansu (8)	District 3 (2)		Zhu Guansan • Li Shijun
Gansu (8)	District 4 (2)		Yang Jiying • Liu Youchen
Gansu (8)	Women (1)		Wei Pei-lan
Fujian (14)	District 1 (4)		Liu Tong • Lin Bingkang • Guo Gongmu • He Sui • Lin Keji (s)
Fujian (14)	District 2 (2)		Xie Chengyu • Li Yu
Fujian (14)	District 3 (4)		Huang Zhezhen • Lian Mou • Wu Chunqing • Ye Daoyuan
Fujian (14)	District 4 (3)		Lai Lian • Zhang Zhen • Qiu Hanping
Fujian (14)	Women (1)		Liu Woying
Guangdong (33)	District 1 (6)		Wu Tiecheng • Zheng Yanfen • Huang Yuanbin • Gao Tingzi • Xie Baoqiao • Wang Guanghi • Zhang Chaoliang (s) • Li Yutian (s) • Wu Zaochi (s) • Liu Chongling (s)
Guangdong (33)	District 2 (4)		Huang Linshu • Ren Guorong • Chen Ruxuan • Pan Yanxing • Chen Zuyi (s)
Guangdong (33)	District 3 (6)		Chen Shaoxian • Fang Shaoyun • Lin Zuomin • Yang Dezhao • Ma Naiyuan • Zheng Hanchuan • Chen Su (s) • Shen Zhijing (s)
Guangdong (33)	District 4 (3)		Liu Ping • He Chunfan • Deng Qingyang • Lu Chongshan (s)
Guangdong (33)	District 5 (4)		Chen Heng • Si Tude • Liang Hancao • Deng Chengtao • Liang Chaowei (s) • Zhang Xizhe (s) • He Shi (s)
Guangdong (33)	District 6 (5)		Deng Shizeng • Lu Zongqi • Tan Huiquan} • Huang Yuming • Zheng Feng • Chen Hanhua (s)
Guangdong (33)	District 7 (2)		Han Hanfan • Wang Jun
Guangdong (33)	Women (3)		Yi Yun Chen • Li Man-kuei • Huang Peilan
Guangxi (16)	District 1 (5)		Zhang Yueling • Wei Yongcheng • Zhang Renmin • Li Renren • Zhai Nianhua • Liao Jingcun (s)
Guangxi (16)	District 2 (5)		Huang Shaohong • Chen Xijiu • Lin Hu • Chen Kewen • Su Rujing · Man Jiyun (s) • Ma Xiaojun (s)
Guangxi (16)	District 3 (5)		Cheng Siyuan • Su Xixun • Lei Yin • Huang Qihan • Ceng Yan • Chen Shoumin (s)
Guangxi (16)	Women (1)		Lou Yiwen
Yunnan (14)	District 1 (5)		An Enpu • Pei Cunfan • Yang Tianli • Duan Kewu • Sun Dongming • Dou Zijin (s) • Liao Xingchao (s)
Yunnan (14)	District 2 (4)		Yang Shisheng • Wan Baobang} • Yang Jialin • Tao Rong • Sun Bingquan (s)
Yunnan (14)	District 3 (4)		Li Peitian • Li Ximi • Ma Chongliu • Li Yuankai • Jiang Gongliang (s) • Zhao Shushu (s) • Shen Yanyuan (s)
Yunnan (14)	Women (1)		Luo Heng
Guizhou (12)	District 1 (5)		Ku Cheng-ting • Song Shuqiao • Wu Daoan • Shang Wenli • Li Zhonggong
Guizhou (12)	District 2 (6)		Liu Jianqun • Chang Tao-fan • Wu Jianping • Huang Yuren • Yin Shuxian • Li Juping
Guizhou (12)	Women (1)		Chen Mingxian
Xikang (5)			Liu Runzhi • Hu Gongxian • Yang Zhonghua • Tan Qizhen • Wu Lin • Chen Guangpu (s)
Qinghai (5)			Zhao Pei • Gao Wenyuan • Ye Cunli • Ma Shijun • Chou Hui-ying • Han Shumiao (s) • Xie Gangjie (s)
Taiwan (8)			Liu Mingchao • Luo Wanche • Huang Kuo-shu • Cai Peihuo • Guo Tianyi • Hsieh Er • Lin Shen • Zheng Pincong • He Jingliao (s)
Liaoning (13)			Liu Shengbin • Lo Ta-yu • Shi Jiuling • Wang Huayi • Meng Guanghou • Chi Shi-ying • Wang Depu • Mo Hanzhu • Fei Hsi-ping • Dong Zhengzhi • Li Jiwu • Liu Yuzhong • Zhou Muwen
Andong (5)			Liu Butong • Guan Dacheng • Liu Bokun • Pao Yi-min • Dong Wei
Liaobei (5)			Liu Zanzhou • Hong Sheng • Liang Su-yung • Gao Yuhe • Fu Ching-yen
Jilin (9)			Li Xien • Zhang Qianhua • Yan Menghua • Huo Zhanyi • Han Yufu • Cheng Lie • Lan Wenzheng • Tian Yushi • Li Xiangheng
Songjiang (6)			Liu Zhaoxun • Qi Lian • Li Feng • Dong Qizheng • Wang Hansheng • Ni Yujie • Zhao Zuyi (s)
Hejiang (5)			Shi Lianfang • Li Tianlin • Liu Minghou • Lang Bingxia • Xie Wenchao
Heilongjiang (5)			Fan Derun • Du Xunruo • Wang Hanzhuo • Guo Dequan • Ji Qingyi
Nenjiang (5)			Wu Yuechao • Yang Zhihuan • Liu Quanzhong • Wang Zhaomin • Huang Jiewen
Xing'an (5)			Zhao Xianwen • Lu Zonglian • Fang Dianhua • Wang Hsiao-hua • Li Yuhua
Jehol (8)			Wang Weixin • Chao Tzu-chi • Cheng Pengyi • Zhang Datian • Zhao Bingqi • Li Yucai • He Meizhi • Li Hui-min • Wang Zhebin (s) • Liu Zhongping (s)
Chahar (5)			Tong Guanxian • Zhang Jichun • Jia Weiju • Lu Fu • Lee Hsiu-fen
Suiyuan (5)			Zhao Yunyi • Qi Zhihou • Xin Chongye • Liu Han • Mao Tan-yun
Ningxia (5)			Ma Shucheng • Bai Jianmin • Cheng Fugang • Zhang Mingjing • Qiang Bin
Xinjiang (5 of 6)			Guang Lu • Hua Shengmu • Ahmed Ziayi • Ni Huade • Amina Bughra
Nanjing (5)			Hu Dunyu • Huang Tong • Liu Baimin • Qin Jijie • Liu Heng-ching
Shanghai (7)			Wang Xinheng • Tcheng Yu-hsiu • Zhu Wende • Yan Huiqing • Fang Zhichao • Ma Shuli • Wang Jiane • Cao Jun (s) • Xie Renzhao (s) • Qian Jianqiu (s)
Beiping (5)			Wu Zhuren • Li Zheng • Cheng Shewo • Tang Siyao • Wang Ai-fen • Liu Qiufang (s)
Qingdao (5)			Jiang Lichuan • Li Zongli • Hu Daoyuan • Cui Renqiu • Zhan Qinghui • Zhang Xiaogu (s) • Wu Zhuming (s)
Tianjin (5)			Wang Renyuan • Guo Zijun • Wen Shiyuan • Li Yaolin • Xia Jingru
Chongqing (5)			Chen Jiesheng • Long Wenzhi • Hu Ziang • Wang Lubing • Bao Huaguo • Gao Yunbin (s)
Dalian (5)			Mu Chao • Wang Qiamin • Wang Yuyang • Hou Tingdu • Xing Shuyan
Harbin (5)			Sun Guiji • He Zhengzhuo • Tan Xuerong • Xu Baichuan • Yu Ruzhou
Hankou (5)			Lang Weihan • Xiong Donggao • Li Jianting • Fei Hsia • Xiao Juetian • Huang Huanru (s)
Guangzhou (5)			Sun Fo • Zhong Tianxin • Wu Chi-mei • Xu Chongqing • Wu Shangying • Huang Zhongyu (s) • Zou Zhifen (s) • Yuan Lianghua (s) • Wu Genhua (s)
Xi'an (5)			Zhao Heting • Yang Daqian • Wang Puhan • Li Zhiting • Chen Jianchen • Feng Dahong (s) • Zhao Wenyi (s)
Shenyang (5)			Liu Guangying • Wang Changyu • Hu Gengnian • Jin Shaoxian • Xiang Runkun
Mongolia (22)			Jirgalang • Bai Lianzhen • Xu Zhankui • Jin Yanghao • Bai Dacheng • Li Yongxin • Xue Xingru • Wu Yunpeng • Yang Junsheng • Jili Zhantai • Xi Zhenduo • Batu Bilig • Wang Pengcheng • Rong Zhao • Hang Jiaxiang • Damulin Wangchuk • Ga Wa • Qi Mu Gong Wang Zal Rabtan • Afu Shou • Hu Haibin • Qiao Jiafu • Wu Jingbin • Li Qing (s) • Da Wa (s)
Tibet (13 of 15)	Tibet (3 of 5)		Tudan Sambu • Jiangba Awang • Tenzin Dangcho
Tibet (13 of 15)	Tibetans in the Interior (5)		Jigme Gragspa • Tsering Dondrup • Tudani Ma • Luosang Gyaltsen • Nawang Kimpa
Tibet (13 of 15)	Provincial Tibetans (5)		Qinghai: Hua Baozang • Tuguan Hutuktu • Xikang: Liu Jiaju • Ma Qingweng • Gansu: Yang Shenghua
Frontier Ethnic Groups (6)	Yunnan (1)		An Zefa
Frontier Ethnic Groups (6)	Guizhou (1)		Luo Ying
Frontier Ethnic Groups (6)	Xikang (1)		Ling Guangdian
Frontier Ethnic Groups (6)	Sichuan (1)		Suo Zhaoshiya
Frontier Ethnic Groups (6)	Guangxi (1)		Huang Yunhuan
Frontier Ethnic Groups (6)	Hunan (1)		Shi Honggui
Overseas voters (10 of 19)	District 1 (2)		Pan Chaoying • Chen Ruzhou • Liu Boji (s)
Overseas voters (10 of 19)	District 2 (1)		Li Bingrui
Overseas voters (10 of 19)	District 3 (1)		Li Jiyuan
Overseas voters (10 of 19)	District 4 (1)		Wang Jianhai
Overseas voters (10 of 19)	District 5 (1)		Wang Jianhai
Overseas voters (10 of 19)	District 6 (1)		Unfilled
Overseas voters (10 of 19)	District 7 (1)		Unfilled
Overseas voters (10 of 19)	District 8 (1)		Unfilled
Overseas voters (10 of 19)	District 9 (1)		Unfilled
Overseas voters (10 of 19)	District 10 (1)		Unfilled
Overseas voters (10 of 19)	District 11 (2)		Unfilled
Overseas voters (10 of 19)	District 12 (2)		Unfilled
Overseas voters (10 of 19)	District 13 (2)		Unfilled
Overseas voters (10 of 19)	District 14 (1)		Liu Ruxin • Zhou Tinghe (s)
Overseas voters (10 of 19)	District 15 (1)		Feng Zhengzhong
Professional groups (89)	Agriculture (18)	Eastern (3)	Qiu Youzhen • Li Qinglin • Wu Wangji
Professional groups (89)	Agriculture (18)	Northern (2)	Qiao Qiming • Niu Jinlu • Leng Peng (s)
Professional groups (89)	Agriculture (18)	Central (3)	Bai Ruchu • Zhao Lianfang • Yang Buping • Yang Cui (s)
Professional groups (89)	Agriculture (18)	Southern (2)	Lin Jingzhong • Ma Runxing
Professional groups (89)	Agriculture (18)	Western (2)	Qi Zhongquan • Hu Deyuan
Professional groups (89)	Agriculture (18)	Northwestern (2)	Zhang Shouyue • Ling Ziwei
Professional groups (89)	Agriculture (18)	Northeast (2)	Zhang Hongxue • Jia Chengzhang • Li Shuzi (s)
Professional groups (89)	Agriculture (18)	Women (2)	Shih Min-chi • Sun Chi-hsu
Professional groups (89)	Fishermen (3)	First District (1)	Xu Panyun
Professional groups (89)	Fishermen (3)	Second District (1)	Jiang Zuozhou
Professional groups (89)	Fishermen (3)	Third District (1)	Xie Zhesheng
Professional groups (89)	Unions (18)	Eastern (3)	Wang Yisheng • Lu Jingshi • Sun Xiangfeng • Sun Jinzhu (s)
Professional groups (89)	Unions (18)	Northern (2)	An Futing • Lei Minglong
Professional groups (89)	Unions (18)	Central (1)	Zhang Jianbai • Tian Yadan (s)
Professional groups (89)	Unions (18)	Southern (2)	Shen Jiajie • Huang Jun
Professional groups (89)	Unions (18)	Western (1)	Chen Tiefu
Professional groups (89)	Unions (18)	Northeastern (1)	Abdullah Timan
Professional groups (89)	Unions (18)	Northwestern (1)	Wang Daren
Professional groups (89)	Unions (18)	Railways (1)	Guo Zhongxing
Professional groups (89)	Unions (18)	Seamen (1)	Sun Luping • He Gaimin (s)
Professional groups (89)	Unions (18)	Highways & Communications (1)	Yuan Qijiong
Professional groups (89)	Unions (18)	Mining and Salt (1)	Peng Erkang
Professional groups (89)	Unions (18)	Women (3)	Wang Chang-hui • Ling Yingzhen • Chang Ping-chiang
Professional groups (89)	Chamber of Commerce (10)	Eastern (2)	Zhu Huiqing • Luo Qinghua • Pan Shihao (s)
Professional groups (89)	Chamber of Commerce (10)	Northern (2)	Xu Hongyu • Ji Dianchuan
Professional groups (89)	Chamber of Commerce (10)	Central (1)	Chen Yuntian
Professional groups (89)	Chamber of Commerce (10)	Southern (2)	Xu Shaoqin • He Zuozhi
Professional groups (89)	Chamber of Commerce (10)	Western (1)	Pan Changyou
Professional groups (89)	Chamber of Commerce (10)	Northwestern (1)	Wang Hansheng
Professional groups (89)	Chamber of Commerce (10)	Northeastern (1)	Fu Rulin • Ma Junde (s)
Professional groups (89)	Industry & mining(10)	Eastern (2)	Yang Guanbei • Liu Piji
Professional groups (89)	Industry & mining(10)	Northern (1)	Li Zhuchen
Professional groups (89)	Industry & mining(10)	Central (1)	Teng Kuntian
Professional groups (89)	Industry & mining(10)	Southern (2)	Zheng Jiajun • Wang Shixian
Professional groups (89)	Industry & mining(10)	Western (1)	Mou Jiaming
Professional groups (89)	Industry & mining(10)	Northwestern (1)	Chai Chunlin
Professional groups (89)	Industry & mining(10)	Northeastern (2)	Shu Yunzhang • Shi Jian
Professional groups (89)	Education (15)	Eastern (2)	Ye Suzhong • Fu Tongxian
Professional groups (89)	Education (15)	Northern (1)	Guo Dengao
Professional groups (89)	Education (15)	Central (1)	Xia Kaiquan • Liu Shuren (s)
Professional groups (89)	Education (15)	Southern (1)	Lei Peihong
Professional groups (89)	Education (15)	Western (1)	Gong Zizhi
Professional groups (89)	Education (15)	Northeastern (1)	Hao Yaodong
Professional groups (89)	Education (15)	Northwestern (1)	Zhao Shixi
Professional groups (89)	Education (15)	Women (2)	Wang Hsiao-ying • Reshide Khanum • Wang Xuechao (s)
Professional groups (89)	Education (15)	University & Colleges (5)	Zhou Hongjing • Ou Yuanhuai • Hu Shuhua • Cheng Qibao • Cheng Yizhi • Zhang Yun (s) • Sa Mengwu (s) • Huang Longxian (s) • Ren Peidao (s)
Professional groups (89)	Freelancers (15)	Press Association (5)	Huang Shao-ku • Cheng Zhongxing • Chen Xunyu • Chen Bosheng • Hu Chien-chung • Song Shushi (s)
Professional groups (89)	Freelancers (15)	Bar Association (3)	Duan Mukai • Jiang Yipin • Fang Jida • Liu Pengying (s) • Wang Mengyun (s)
Professional groups (89)	Freelancers (15)	Accountants Association (1)	Xi Yushu
Professional groups (89)	Freelancers (15)	Technicians (2)	Zou Shuwen • Zeng Yangfu
Professional groups (89)	Medicine (4)	Chinese medicine (2)	Tan Qin • Shi Jinmo
Professional groups (89)	Medicine (4)	Other (2)	Yu Songyun • Yang Chongrui

=== Supplementary members ===
Following the Retreat of the government of Republic of China to Taiwan, the three-year term of the representatives was extended indefinitely until new elections could be held under an ROC government in Mainland China. Supplementary members were elected for the same extended term in 1969. Starting in 1972, additional supplementary representatives were elected across the entire Free area of the Republic of China for the ordinary three-year terms; however, they served alongside the representatives elected in 1948 and 1969, and thus the first Legislative Yuan remained extant despite the regularly scheduled elections. The representatives elected in 1948 and 1969 collectively retired on 31 December 1991, and the subsequent supplementary election in 1992 was considered an election for the second Legislative Yuan.

==== Taiwan ====
Election	Constituency	Elected members
1969 (11)	Taipei (4)	Chang Tsan-tang • Hsieh Kuo-cheng • Hong Yan-chiu • Huang Hsin-chieh
1969 (11)	District 1 (3)	Lee Ju-tsung • Liu Chin-yueh • Liu Kuo-tsai
1969 (11)	District 2 (4)	Huang Tsung-kun • Liang Hsu Chun-chu • Wu Chi-fu • Kuo Kuo-chi
1972 (27)	Taipei (5)	
1972 (27)	District 1 (3)	
1972 (27)	District 2 (3)	
1972 (27)	District 3 (5)	
1972 (27)	District 4 (5)	
1972 (27)	District 5 (4)	
1972 (27)	District 6 (1)	
1972 (27)	Highland Aborigines (1)	
1975 (27)	Taipei (5)	
1975 (27)	District 1 (3)	
1975 (27)	District 2 (3)	
1975 (27)	District 3 (5)	
1975 (27)	District 4 (5)	
1975 (27)	District 5 (4)	
1975 (27)	District 6 (1)	
1975 (27)	Highland Aborigines (1)	
1980 (53)	Taipei (8)	
1980 (53)	Kaohsiung (5)	
1980 (53)	District 1 (8)	
1980 (53)	District 2 (6)	
1980 (53)	District 3 (9)	
1980 (53)	District 4 (8)	
1980 (53)	District 5 (5)	
1980 (53)	District 6 (2)	
1980 (53)	Highland Aborigines (1)	
1980 (53)	Lowland Aborigines (1)	
1983 (54)	Taipei (8)	
1983 (54)	Kaohsiung (5)	
1983 (54)	District 1 (9)	
1983 (54)	District 2 (6)	
1983 (54)	District 3 (9)	
1983 (54)	District 4 (8)	
1983 (54)	District 5 (5)	
1983 (54)	District 6 (2)	
1983 (54)	Highland Aborigines (1)	
1983 (54)	Lowland Aborigines (1)	
1986 (56)	Taipei (8)	
1986 (56)	Kaohsiung (5)	
1986 (56)	District 1 (9)	
1986 (56)	District 2 (6)	
1986 (56)	District 3 (10)	
1986 (56)	District 4 (9)	
1986 (56)	District 5 (5)	
1986 (56)	District 6 (2)	
1986 (56)	Highland Aborigines (1)	
1986 (56)	Lowland Aborigines (1)	
1989 (82)	Taipei 1 (6)	Chao Chen-peng • Chou Chuan • Jaw Shau-kong • Ting Shou-chung • Chen Shui-bian • Frank Hsieh
1989 (82)	Taipei 2 (6)	Chang Chih-min • Hung Tung-kuei • Lin Yu-siang • Yok Mu-ming • Lin Cheng-chieh • Yeh Chu-lan
1989 (82)	Kaohsiung 1 (4)	Lin Shou-shan • Wang Chih-hsiung • Huang Tien-sheng • Lee Ching-hsiung
1989 (82)	Kaohsiung 2 (4)	Wang Tein-ging • Wu Der-mei • Chang Chun-hsiung • Lin Hong-tsung
1989 (82)	Taipei County (11)	Chou Shu-fu • Hsieh Mei-huey • Hung Hsiu-chu • Kuo Cheng-i • Lin Jih-jia • Liu Shen-liang • Wu Tzu • Yu Ming-tsai • Cheng Yu-chen • Lu Hsiu-yi • Tsai Sheng-pang
1989 (82)	Yilan County (2)	Lin Tsong-ming • Chen Ding-nan
1989 (82)	Taoyuan County (5)	Helen Chu Fong-chi • Huang Chu-wen • Liu Hsin-sun • Yang Min-shen • Hsu Kuo-tai
1989 (82)	Hsinchu County (1)	Hsu Yi-chuan
1989 (82)	Miaoli County (2)	Ho Chih-hui • Liu Kuo-chao
1989 (82)	Taichung County (4)	Lee Tzu-ching • Liu Sung-pan • Wu Yao-kuan • Tien Tsai-ting
1989 (82)	Changhua County (4)	Hsu Chang Ai-lien • Lin Hsi-shan • Chen Yuang-yuen • Huang Min-ho
1989 (82)	Nantou County (2)	Shen Shih-hsiung • Pang Pai-hsien
1989 (82)	Yunlin County (3)	Liao Fuw-peen • Wu Shian-rh • Ju Gau-jeng
1989 (82)	Chiayi County (2)	Chiu Chun-nan • Wong Chung-chun
1989 (82)	Tainan County (4)	Hung Yu-chin • Lee Sen-fong • Li Zongren • Wei Yao-chien
1989 (82)	Kaohsiung County (4)	Hsiao Chin-lan • Huang Ho-ching • Wang Jin-pyng • Yu Cheng-hsien
1989 (82)	Pingtung County (3)	Lin Kuo-lung • Wang Shu-yun • Chiu Lien-hui
1989 (82)	Taitung County (1)	Yao Eng-chi
1989 (82)	Hualien County (1)	Huang Chung-i
1989 (82)	Penghu County (1)	Chen Kuei-miao
1989 (82)	Keelung City (1)	Chang Chian-hwa
1989 (82)	Hsinchu City (1)	Hsu Wu-sheng
1989 (82)	Taichung City (3)	Hung Chao-nan • Shen Chih-hwei • Liu Wen-hsiung
1989 (82)	Chiayi City (1)	Chang Po-ya
1989 (82)	Tainan City (2)	Wang Tao-fu • Hong Chi-chang
1989 (82)	Highland Aborigines (2)	Hua Chia-chih • Marai Gumi
1989 (82)	Lowland Aborigines (2)	Tsay Chung-han • Chuang Chin-sheng

==== Fujian ====
The number of members for Fujian was increased from 14 to 15, with a supplementary member representing the Kinmen and Matsu Islands (which had remained under the control of the Republic of China) elected from 1972 onwards.

Election	Elected member
1972	Wu Chin-tzan
1975	Wu Chin-tzan
1980	Wu Chin-tzan
1983	Wu Chin-tzan
1986	Wu Chin-tzan
1989	Huang Wuu-ran
