= Yang Youjiong =

Republic of China politician (1901–1973)

Yang Youjiong (Chinese: 楊幼炯; 1901–1973) was a Chinese politician, political scientist, journalist, and lawyer.

Yang was born in 1901, and his ancestry can be traced back to Changde. Yang received his early education in Japan. He returned to China and graduated from Fudan University with a bachelor's degree in political science.

After completing his studies, Yang began a career in journalism at the China Daily, eventually becoming the publication's chief writer and supervisor. He later became chief editor at the Central News Agency.

During his academic career, Yang taught at National Central University, the Shanghai Law and Politics School, the National University, Jinan University, and the Judicial Yuan's Judges Academy. He also served as dean of the Jianguo Business and Law School.

In 1946, Yang was awarded the Order of Brilliant Star with Purple Grand Cordon.

Yang served on the 1946 National Constituent Assembly which drew up the Constitution of the Republic of China, and was elected to the First Legislative Yuan in the 1948 Chinese legislative election, one of five lawmakers to represent Hunan's second district.

He died in Taiwan on 5 December 1973.
