= Wang Peiren =

Republic of China politician (1900–1970)

Wang Peiren (Chinese: 王培仁; 21 May 1900 – 14 April 1970) was a Chinese-born politician who served on the Legislative Yuan. In later life, he moved to Taiwan and served on several committees convened to provide oversight of the civil service sector.

== Early life, education, and career ==
Wang was born on 21 May 1900, and his ancestry could be traced to Lu'an, Anhui. After graduating from Peking University and Hosei University, he worked for the Kuomintang as a party historian and archivist. Wang was also a member of the preparatory committee responsible for the establishment of National Anhui University.

== Political career in China ==
In March 1942, Wang was appointed to the fourth term of the Legislative Yuan convened during the period of political tutelage. Wang retained his seat following the 1947 implementation of the Constitution of the Republic of China and the 1948 Chinese legislative election. He resigned as a representative of Anhui's third district on 6 January 1949 to accept an appointment within the Ministry of Water Resources. Chen Tie succeeded Wang as a legislator.

== Later career in Taiwan ==
Wang followed the relocation of the government of the Republic of China to Taiwan. In 1967, Wang became a member of the Civil Service Disciplinary Commission as well as the Transportation and Postal Staff Promotion Examination Committee. The following year, he served as a member of a Republic of China Armed Forces committee convened to oversee the transition of retired military officers to civil service positions. In 1969, Wang moved to the Civil Service Higher Examination Committee.

Wang died in Taiwan on 14 April 1970.
