= Ren Heping =

Chinese military officer and politician

Ren Heping (Chinese: 任和平; 1900–1950) was a Chinese military officer and politician who served in the National Revolutionary Army and Legislative Yuan.

Ren was a member of the fifth graduating class of Whampoa Military Academy. While a student, he joined the Kuomintang in 1926. Ren successively served the National Revolutionary Army as a platoon leader, company commander, and battalion commander. Within the Sichuan Provincial Security Department, Ren began at the rank of colonel and trained other members. He later became a deputy brigade commander and chief of staff.

In 1941, Ren was appointed magistrate of Mingshan County. In September 1945, he became magistrate of Songpan County. Between June 1945 and March 1946, Ren was magistrate of Qijiang County. Concurrently, he was magistrate of Qionglai County from June 1945 to June 1949. In 1949, Ren look office as a supplemental member of the First Legislative Yuan, succeeding Deng Huamin. Ren also served as liaison between Wang Lingji and Hu Zongnan. In June 1950, Ren was arrested by the Chengdu Municipal Security Department, and held in Qionglai. He was publicly executed on 15 December 1950, following a public trial.
