= Mao Tan-yun =

Chinese politician

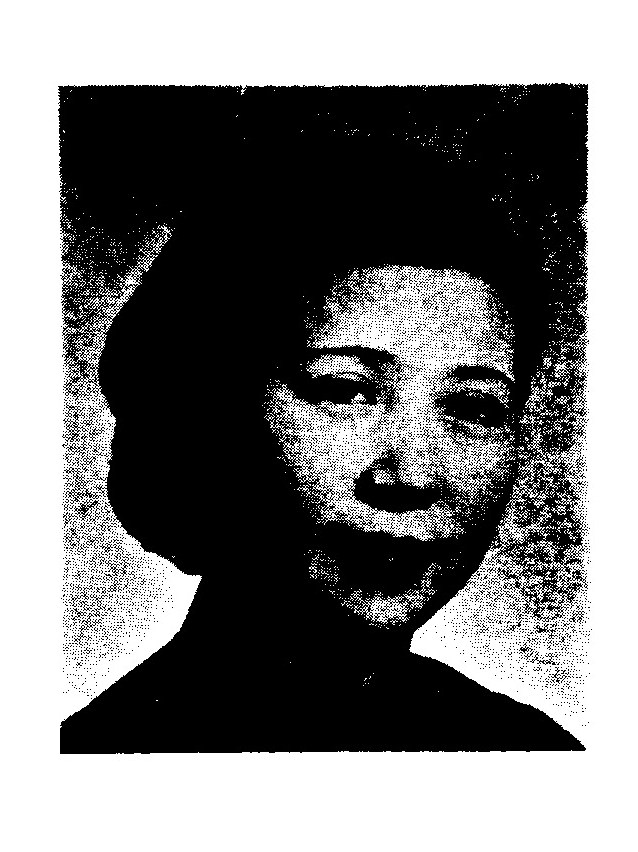

Member of the Legislative Yuan
- In office 1948–1991
- Constituency: Suiyuan

Personal details
- Born: 1912
- Died: 5 March 2012 (aged 99–100)

Mao Tan-yun (Chinese: 莫淡雲, 1912 – 5 March 2012) was a Chinese educator and politician. She was among the first group of women elected to the Legislative Yuan in 1948.

== Biography ==
Mao was born in 1912. Originally from Changsha County in Hunan Province, she attended Wuchang Higher Normal School, after which she worked as a teacher and served as head of Suiyuan Girls' Vocational School. She joined the Kuomintang and became chair of the women's section in Suiyuan Province.

In the 1948 elections to the Legislative Yuan, Mao was a Kuomintang candidate in Suiyuan and was elected to parliament. She relocated to Taiwan during the Chinese Civil War, where she became a committee member of the Institute of Revolutionary Practice. She died in 2012.
