= Liu Muzhen =

Chinese politician

Member of the Legislative Yuan
- In office 1948–1951
- Succeeded by: Fu Chin-yuan
- Constituency: Shanxi

Personal details
- Born: 1910
- Died: 1990

Liu Muzhen (Chinese: 劉慕真, 1910–1990) was a Chinese politician. She was among the first group of women elected to the Legislative Yuan in 1948.

== Biography ==
Originally from Youyu County in Shanxi province, Liu attended the primary school attached to Datong No. 5 Women's Normal School. In 1923 she began attending Xuanhua District Zhili Provincial No. 16 Middle School, and in 1926 transferred to a school in Peking. In 1927 she started the National Women's University preparatory course for liberal arts, and the following year was admitted to the Department of History. She represented the university at the National Student Federation in 1929 and joined the Kuomintang. After graduating in 1933, she moved Taiyuan, where she founded Taiyuan Private Women's Vocational School and became its principal. Following the start of the Second Sino-Japanese War, she helped establish the Shanxi Women’s Field Service Corps. She became deputy director general of the Shanxi Women's Association in 1940.

Liu was a candidate in Shanxi in the 1948 elections for the Legislative Yuan, and was elected to parliament. After being elected, she sat on the Education and Culture Committee and the Political and Local Autonomy Committee, and was convenor of the Social Committee. She remained in China after the Chinese Civil War and her membership of the Legislative Yuan was cancelled in 1951 after she failed to attend the fifth session; she was replaced by Fu Chin-yuan. She worked for the civil affairs bureau in Taiyuan and then studied in the Department of Political Science at North China Military and Political University. She died in 1990.
