= Cheng Xiaofu =

Chinese politician

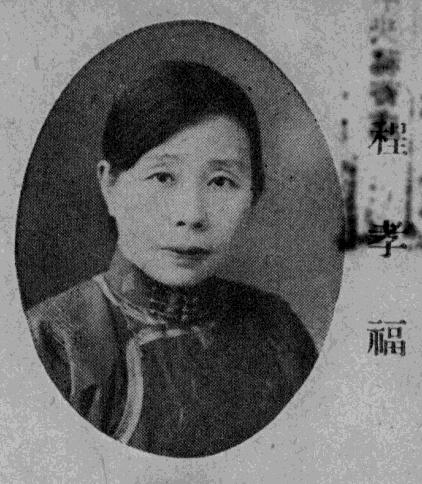

Member of the Legislative Yuan
- In office 1948–1950
- Succeeded by: Ceng Huaying
- Constituency: Jiangxi

Cheng Xiaofu (Chinese: 程孝福) was a Chinese politician. She was among the first group of women elected to the Legislative Yuan in 1948.

== Biography ==
Cheng was a candidate in Jiangxi province in the 1948 elections for the Legislative Yuan and was elected to parliament. After being elected, she sat on the Economic and Resource Committee, the Education and Culture Committee and the Finance and Financial Committee. Her membership of the Legislative Yuan was cancelled in 1950 and she was replaced by Ceng Huaying.
