= Li Tianlin =

Chinese politician

Member of the Legislative Yuan
- In office 1948–
- Constituency: Hejiang

Personal details
- Died: 1995

Li Tianlin (Chinese: 李田林, died 1995) was a Chinese civil servant and politician. She was among the first group of women elected to the Legislative Yuan in 1948.

== Biography ==
Li was originally from Jilin City, where she attended the Jilin Province Women Teachers College. She went on to study at Northeastern University in Shenyang, but transferred to Nankai University in Tianjin after the Mukden Incident. She subsequently attended graduate school at Columbia University. After returning to China, she became a secretary at Tianjin city council, and then an inspector for Peking municipality. She transferred to the civil service, becoming a commissioner at the Ministry of Railways. Later she became a secretary at the head office of China Airlines.

In the 1948 elections to the Legislative Yuan she ran as a candidate in Hejiang Province and was elected to parliament. Her husband Tian Yushi was also elected in Jilin Province. The couple later moved to São Paulo in Brazil and then to New York City, where she became a teacher. She died in 1995.
