= Fu Ching-yen =

Chinese civil servant and politician (1906–1995)

Member of the Legislative Yuan
- In office 1948–1991
- Constituency: Liaobei

Personal details
- Born: 22 June 1906 Faku County, China
- Died: 24 May 1995 (aged 88) Vancouver, Canada

Fu Ching-yen (Chinese: 富靜岩, 22 June 1906 – 24 May 1995) was a Chinese civil servant and politician. She was among the first group of women elected to the Legislative Yuan in 1948.

== Biography ==
Fu was born in Faku County in Liaoning province in 1906. She attended Shanghai China Public University, where she graduated from the Department of Political Economy. She subsequently attended the School of Economics and Political Science at the University of London. She began working for the Ministry of Social Affairs as a commissioner, advisor and head of the Accounting Department. She also served as chair the Chinese Women's Life Improvement Association.

She was a Kuomintang candidate in Liaobei province in the 1948 elections to the Legislative Yuan, in which she was elected to parliament. Her husband Meng Kuang-hou was also elected from Liaoning Province. During the Chinese Civil War the couple relocated to Taiwan. She died in Richmond Hospital in Vancouver in 1995.
