= Wu Zaochi =

Chinese politician

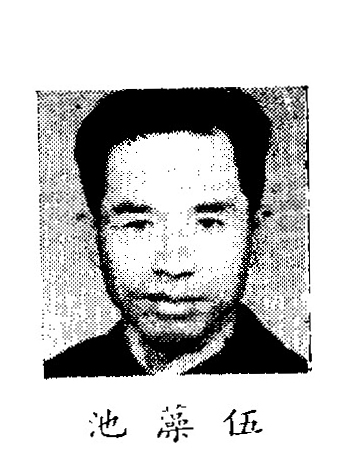
伍藻池近照

Wu Zaochi (Chinese: 伍藻池; born 1903) was a Chinese politician.

Born in 1903, a native of Taishan, Guangdong, Wu was educated in the United States, where he earned a doctorate in political science from Johns Hopkins University. Wu returned to China to accept a position as professor at the Koumin University of Kwangtun In 1946, Wu was elected to the Constituent National Assembly of the Republic of China, as a representative of the China Democratic Socialist Party. He took office as a member of the Legislative Yuan in March 1947. In later life, Wu moved to the United States.
