= Ma Shucheng =

Chinese politician

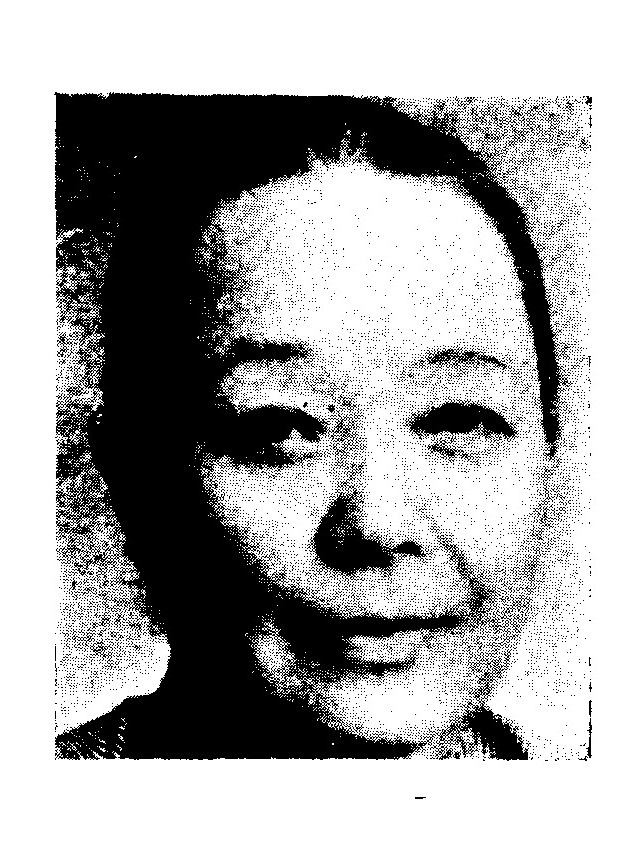

Member of the Legislative Yuan
- In office 1948–1966
- Constituency: Ningxia

Personal details
- Born: 1891
- Died: 23 June 1966 (aged 74–75)

Ma Shucheng (Chinese: 馬書城; 1891 – 23 June 1966) was a Chinese educator and politician. She was among the first group of women elected to the Legislative Yuan in 1948.

== Biography ==
Originally from Chengdu in Sichuan Province, Ma attended Sichuan Second Class Girls' School and Sichuan Sericulture Middle School, before graduating from Peking Girls' Normal School. She became a teacher and served as director of school discipline and education at Heilongjiang Girls' Middle School. She married Ma Fuxiang, a military leader and politician.

In the 1948 elections to the Legislative Yuan, Ma was a Kuomintang candidate in Ningxia Province and was elected to parliament. She relocated to Taiwan during the Chinese Civil War, where she became a member of the Chinese Women’s Anti-Communist and Anti-Russian Federation. She died in 1966.
