= Yang Pao-lin =

Chinese politician

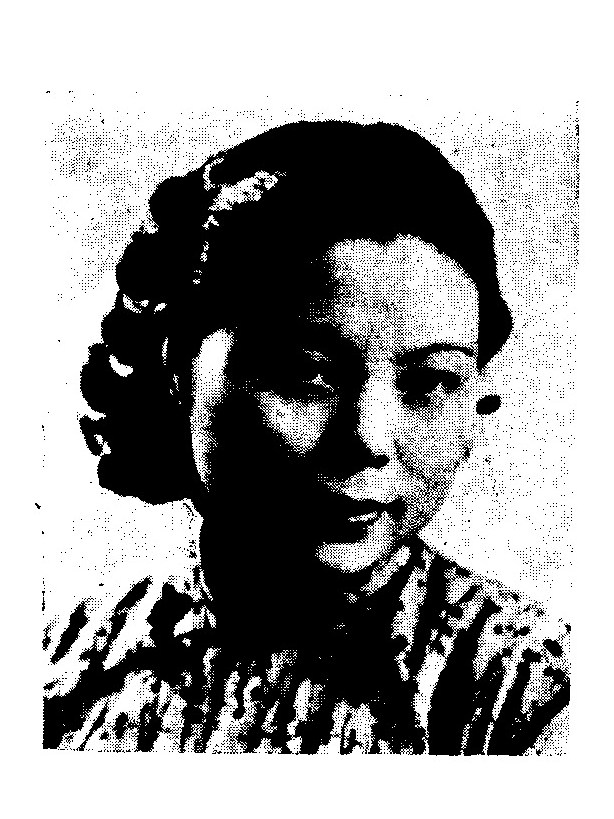

Member of the Legislative Yuan
- In office 1948–1991
- Constituency: Shandong

Personal details
- Born: 4 June 1911 Shandong, China
- Died: 2 July 1993 (aged 82)

Yang Pao-lin (Chinese: 楊寶琳, 29 June 1911 – 2 July 1993) was a Chinese politician. She was among the first group of women elected to the Legislative Yuan in 1948.

== Biography ==
Yang was born in 1911 and was originally from Heze County in Shandong province. She graduated from China University and was employed as headteacher of Shandong War Orphan Middle School from 1945 to 1947. She served as president of the Shandong Women's Association from 1945 to 1946 and as chair of the Shandong Women's Movement Committee from 1945 to 1947. She also headed the women's section of the Shandong People's Self-Defence Corps. She married Yang Jialin, a politician, and had two daughters.

Yang was a Kuomintang candidate in Shandong in the 1948 elections for the Legislative Yuan and was elected to parliament. She relocated to Taiwan during the Chinese Civil War, where she became an executive member of the Taiwan Consumer's Association. She died in 1993.
