= Chou Min =

Chinese politician

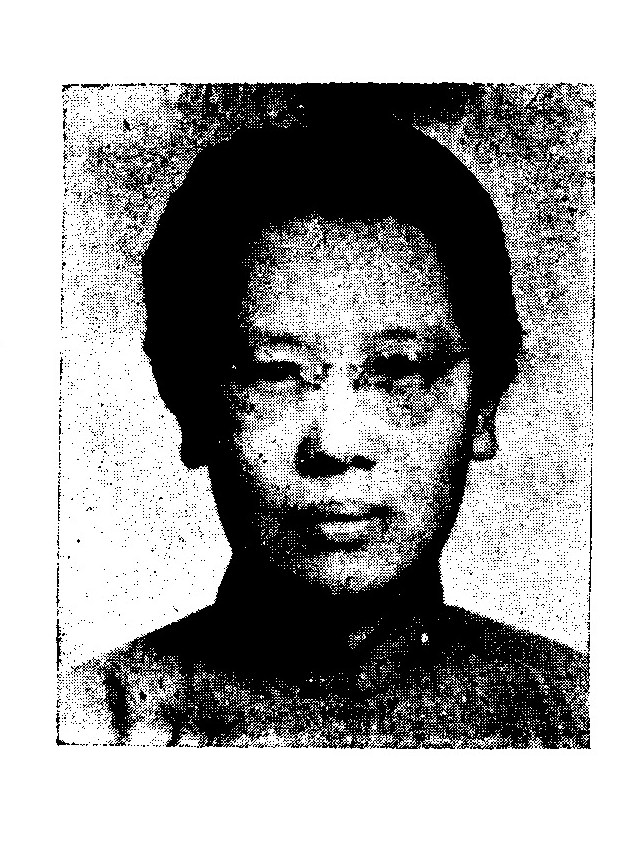

Member of the Legislative Yuan
- In office 1948–
- Constituency: Hubei

Personal details
- Born: 1900

Chou Min (Chinese: 周敏, born 1900) was a Chinese educator and politician. She was among the first group of women elected to the Legislative Yuan in 1948.

== Biography ==
Born in 1900 and originally from Luotian County in Hubei province, Chou attended National Peking Women's Normal University and subsequently worked as a teacher at Hebei Provincial Women's Normal School and National Central University. She became headmistress of Hubei Provincial Women's Normal School and founded Hankou City No. 1 Girls' High School and Hubei Provincial No. 2 Girls' Normal School, serving as headmistress of both.

Chou served for two terms in the Provisional Senate of Hubei and as a member of the provincial government. She was a Kuomintang candidate in Hubei province in the 1948 elections for the Legislative Yuan and was elected to parliament. She relocated to Taiwan during the Chinese Civil War, where she remained a member of the Legislative Yuan.
