= Der-zheng Wang =

Chinese politician

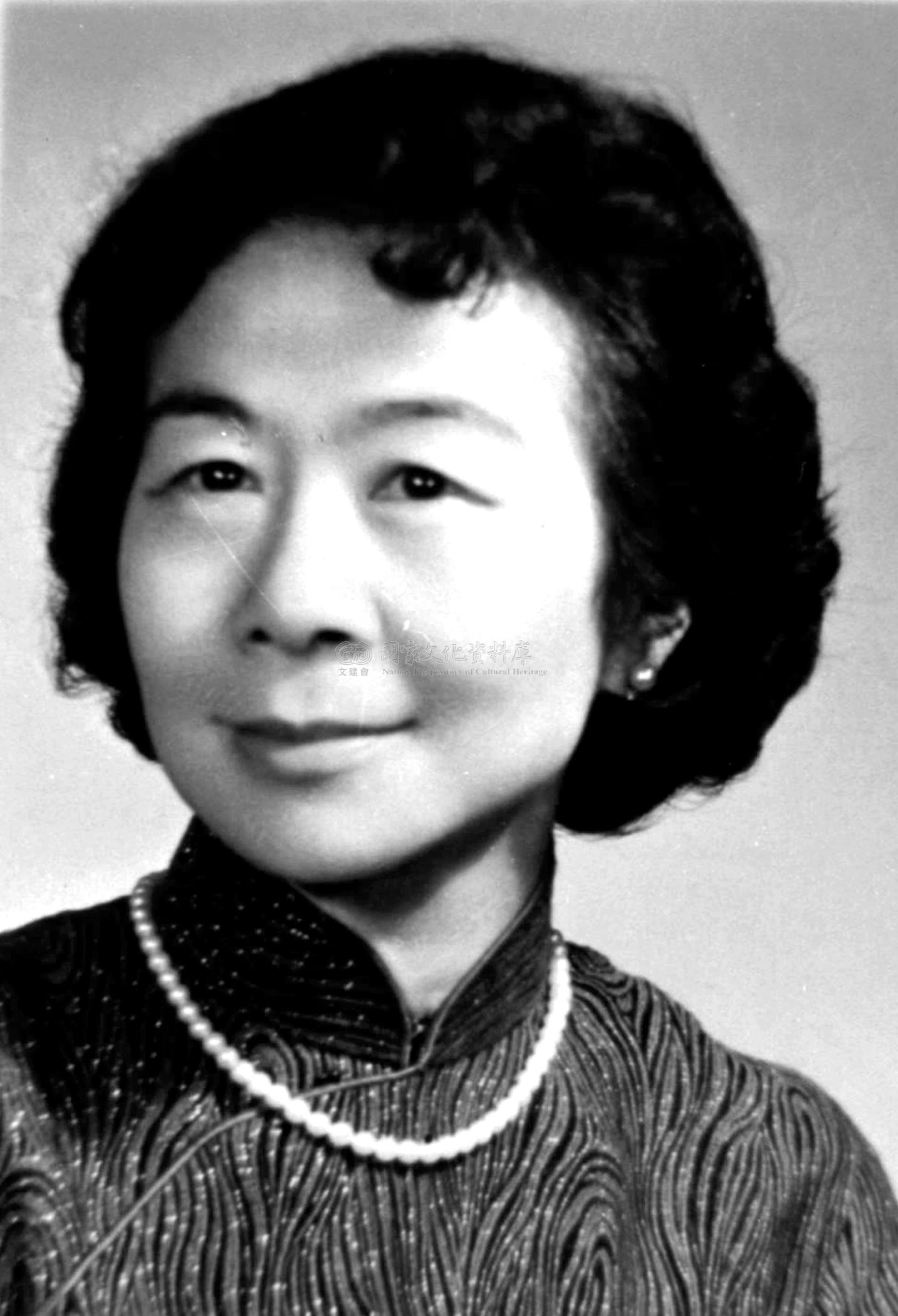

Member of the Legislative Yuan
- In office 1948–1991
- Constituency: Jiangsu

Personal details
- Born: 1912
- Died: 30 November 2009 (aged 96–97) Waterloo, Canada

Elizabeth Der-zheng Wang (Chinese: 王德箴, 1912 – 30 November 2009) was a Chinese politician. She was among the first group of women elected to the Legislative Yuan in 1948.

== Biography ==
Born in 1912, Wang was originally from Xiao County in Jiangsu province. She studied for a bachelor's degree in Chinese and English literature at National Central University, graduating in 1935. She then went to the United States, where she earned for a master's degree in English literature at the University of North Carolina in 1939, after which she was a graduate student in the Institute of Political Science of the Catholic University of America. Returning to China in 1940, she became a professor at Guangxi University, National Chengchi University. She also headed the cultural group of the Women's Youth Division of the Three People's Principles Youth League. She married Ju-Yu Chang, with whom she had three sons.

A member of the Provisional Senate of Jiangsu province, Wang was a Kuomintang candidate in Jiangsu province in the 1948 elections for the Legislative Yuan, and was elected to parliament. She relocated to Taiwan during the Chinese Civil War, where she was a professor of English literature at Soochow University. She immigrated to Canada in 1993 to live at the Beechwood Manor care home in Waterloo, Ontario, where she died in 2009.
