= Fei Hsia =

Chinese politician

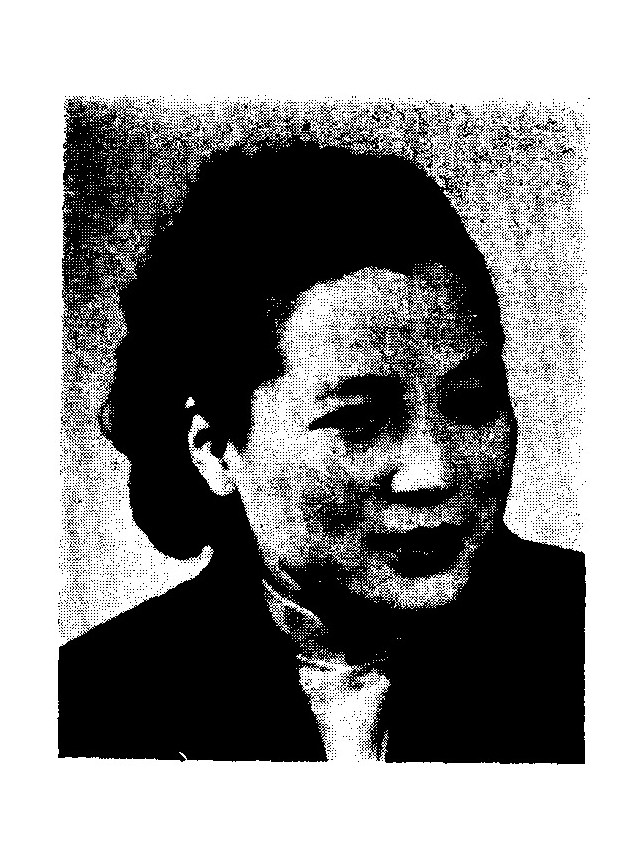

Member of the Legislative Yuan
- In office 1948–1991
- Constituency: Hankou

Personal details
- Born: 1910 Zhongxiang County, China
- Died: 23 July 1995 (aged 84–85)

Fei Hsia (Chinese: 費俠, 1910 – 23 July 1995) was a Chinese politician. She was among the first group of women elected to the Legislative Yuan in 1948.

== Biography ==
Fei was born in Zhongxiang County in Hubei province in 1910. She attended Moscow Sun Yat-sen University, graduating from the Department of Political Science. A member of the Chinese Communist Party, she was arrested in 1931 and later married Xu Enzeng, the Director of the Kuomintang Secret Service Headquarters. She was a delegate to the Constituent National Assembly that drew up the Constitution of the Republic of China, and was subsequently a candidate in Hankou in the 1948 elections to the Legislative Yuan, in which she was elected to parliament. She relocated to Taiwan during the Chinese Civil War and died in 1995.
