= Lin Hong-tsung =

Taiwanese businessman and politician

- 林宏宗

Member of the Legislative Yuan
- In office 1 February 1996 – 31 January 2002
- Constituency: Kaohsiung 2 (South)
- In office 1 February 1990 – 31 January 1993
- Constituency: Kaohsiung 2 (South)

Personal details
- Born: 29 October 1951 (age 74)
- Party: Kuomintang
- Education: Nankai University

Lin Hong-tsung (Chinese: 林宏宗; born 29 October 1951) is a Taiwanese businessman and politician who served in the Legislative Yuan from 1990 to 1993 and again between 1996 and 2002.

Lin attended Kaohsiung Industrial High School and earned a master's degree from Nankai University. He was active in a few Buddhist organizations and ran his own construction company.

He was elected to the Legislative Yuan for the first time in 1989, and won consecutive terms in 1995 and 1998. Lin ran again in 2001, and was defeated. During his tenure as legislator, he called for the Ministry of Justice Investigation Bureau to become an independent ministry.
