= Pao Yi-min =

Chinese politician

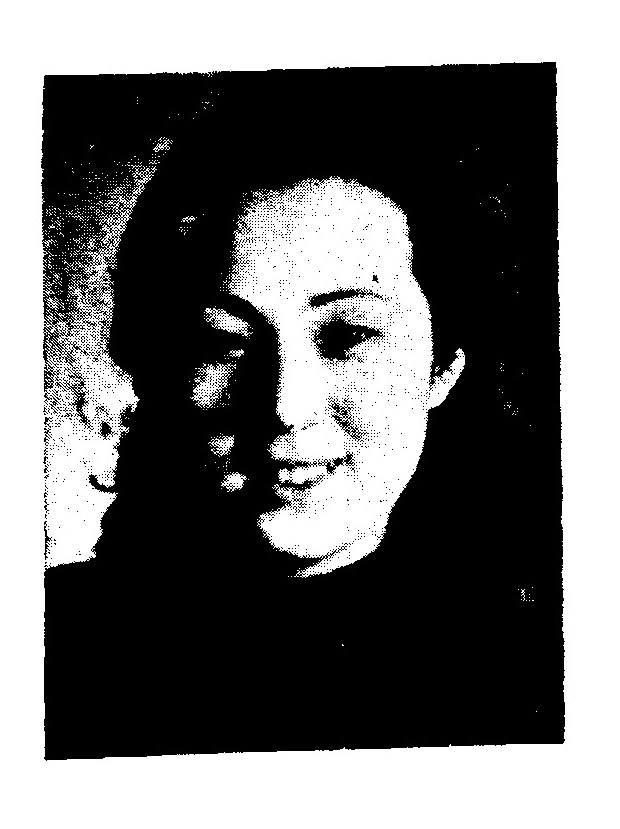

Member of the Legislative Yuan
- In office 1948–1991
- Constituency: Andong

Personal details
- Born: 12 September 1906
- Died: 11 March 1993 (aged 86)

Pao Yi-min (Chinese: 包一民, 12 September 1906 – 11 March 1993) was a Chinese politician. She was one of the first group of women elected to the Legislative Yuan in 1948.

== Biography ==
Pao studied Chinese studies at Northeastern University. She joined the Kuomintang and became chair of the women's section in Andong Province. A member of the National Political Council, she was part of the Constitutional National Assembly that drew up the Constitution of the Republic of China. She was subsequently a candidate in the 1948 elections, in which she was elected to the Legislative Yuan. She subsequently relocated to Taiwan during the Chinese Civil War, where remained a member of parliament until 1991. She died in 1993
