= Qiao Jiafu =

Chinese politician

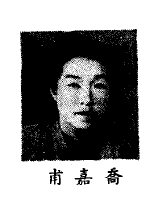

Member of the Legislative Yuan
- In office 1948–1963
- Constituency: Mongolia

Personal details
- Born: 1916 Peking, China
- Died: August 1978 (aged 61–62)

Qiao Jiafu (Chinese: 喬嘉甫, 1916 – August 1978), also known as Hou Shufen (侯淑芬), was a Chinese politician and Mongolian tribal leader. She was among the first group of women elected to the Legislative Yuan in 1948.

== Biography ==
Qiao was born in Peking into a family from Kalaqin banner in Rehe Province. At the age of 13 she was betrothed to a nobleman, Dolji Alash. Her father died when she was 14 and she and her mother settled in Ürümqi in Xinjiang Province. She had a son with Dolji Alash, who died aged three. Dolji Alash also died in 1937. The following year she entered Xinjiang Women's College. When the Jasagh of the Dzungar people died during the same year with no male heir, she succeeded him. In 1943 the Xinjian provincial government appointed her to resolve a dispute between herdsmen. She was appointed deputy commander of the security regiment of Hefeng County the following year.

In 1945 Qiao was appointed to the Xinjiang Provincial Senate. In the same year she joined the Kuomintang. She was subsequently a delegate to the 1946 Constituent National Assembly that drew up the constitution of the Republic of China. She founded a Mongolian primary school in Ürümqi in 1947. In the 1948 elections to the Legislative Yuan, Qiao was a candidate in Mongolia and was elected to parliament. She was captured by communist forces during the Chinese Civil War and sentenced in 1951. After completing her sentence, she was placed at the Tarim Farm Experimental Station as a sewing worker. She died in August 1978.
