= Cui Renqiu =

Chinese educator and politician

Member of the Legislative Yuan
- In office 1948–1951
- Constituency: Qingdao

Personal details
- Born: Linzi County, China
- Died: February 1959; Linzi County, China

Cui Renqiu (Chinese: 崔紉秋, died February 1959) was a Chinese educator and politician. She was among the first group of women elected to the Legislative Yuan in 1948.

== Biography ==
Cui was born in Linzi County in Shandong Province. She taught at Shandong Model Elementary School and became head of a primary school affiliated with Jinan Women Teacher's College. She joined the Kuomintang and became a member of its executive committee in Qingdao in 1925 and Tai'an in 1928. She sat on the steering committee of the Central Women's Movement and was a member of the Chongqing chapter of the China Children's Education Society. She also wrote a reference book on housekeeping and several articles in Women's Monthly magazine.

In the 1948 parliamentary elections Cui was elected to the Legislative Yuan from Qingdao. She became a member of the Education and Culture Committee, the Foreign Affairs Committee and the Legislative Affairs Committee. In 1949 she was one of the members of the legislature to sign a statement accepting the rule of the Chinese Communist Party. Her husband Liu Cixiao, who was director of Shandong University, was executed the following year. In 1951 she forfeited her seat in the Legislative Yuan (which now operated in Taiwan) after missing the fourth session.

Cui died in January 1959 in Linzi.
