= Lu Yun-chang =

Chinese politician

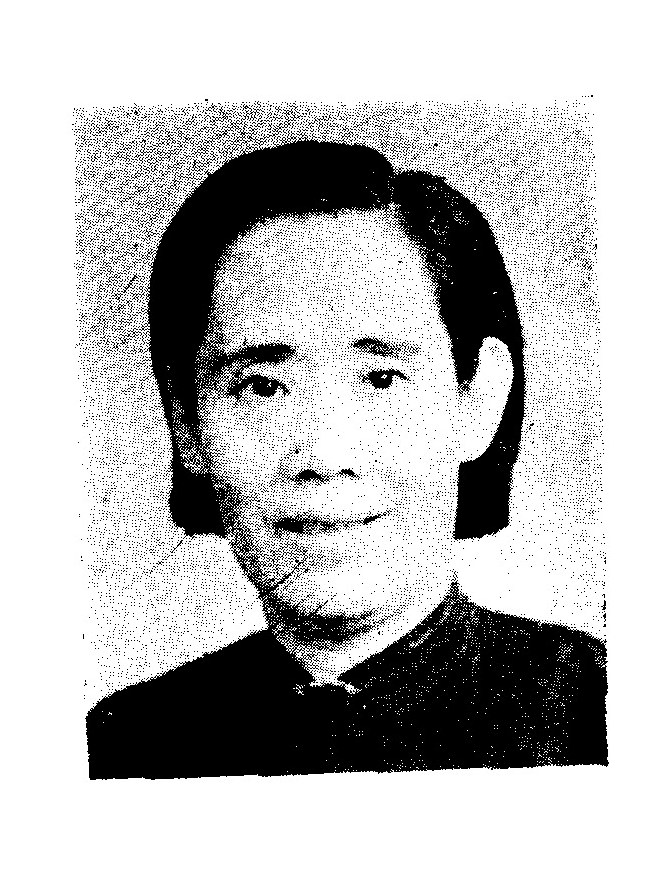

Member of the Legislative Yuan
- In office 1948–1974
- Constituency: Shandong

Personal details
- Born: 14 September 1891 Nanchang County, China
- Died: 19 June 1974 (aged 82) Taipei, Taiwan

Lu Yun-chang (Chinese: 呂雲章, 14 September 1891 – 19 June 1974) was a Chinese politician. She was among the first group of women elected to the Legislative Yuan in 1948.

== Biography ==
Lu was born in Nanchang County in Jiangxi Province to a family from the village of Liugong in Fushan County in Shandong Province. She attended Peking Normal Women's University, graduating from the Department of Chinese Literature. She subsequently worked as an education inspector in Hebei and Anhui provinces, as headteacher of a girls' school in Tong County in Hebei and as director at Beijing Normal University.

In the 1948 elections to the Legislative Yuan, she ran as a Kuomintang candidate in Shandong and was elected to parliament. She relocated to Taiwan during the Chinese Civil War, where she remained a member of the Legislative Yuan until her death in 1974.
