= Fang Jida =

Chinese lawyer and politician

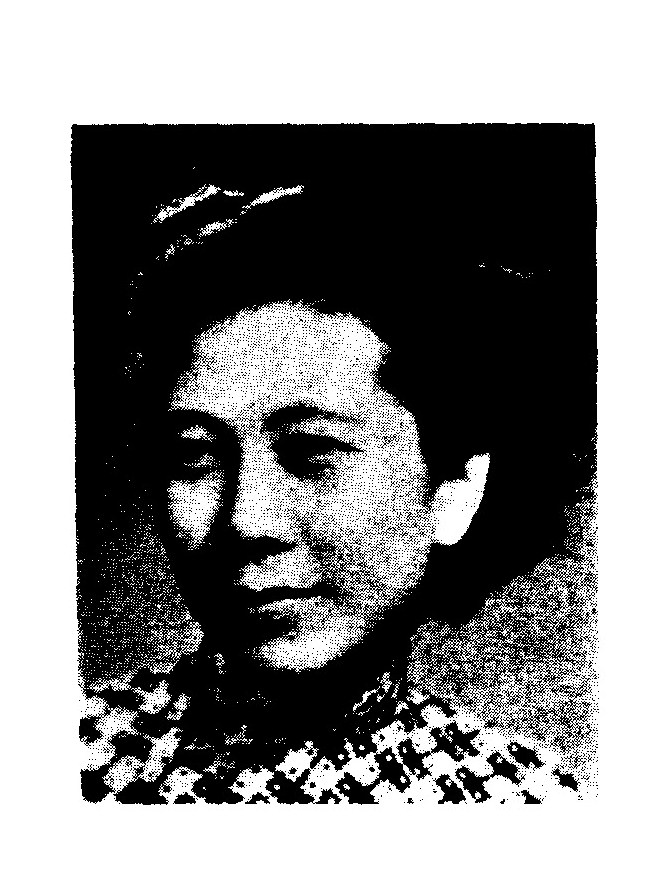

Member of the Legislative Yuan
- In office 1948–1991
- Constituency: Bar Association

Personal details
- Born: 1912

Fang Jida (Chinese: 方冀達, born 1912) was a Chinese lawyer and politician. She was among the first group of women elected to the Legislative Yuan in 1948.

== Biography ==
Fang was originally from Yin County in Zhejiang Province. She attended Ningfu Women's Normal School, but was expelled from participating in the student movement. She subsequently earned a law degree at Chizhi University in Shanghai, and went on to become a member of the Shanghai Bar Association. Entering politics, she served as an alternate senator of the Shanghai Senate. In the 1948 elections to the Legislative Yuan, three seats were elected by the Bar Association and Fang was chosen as one of its representatives. Like much of the Republic of China government, she moved to Taipei, where she continued practicing as a lawyer until 1966 and became a member of the Taipei City Bar Association. She resigned from the Legislative Yuan in 1991.
