= He Meizhi =

Chinese politician

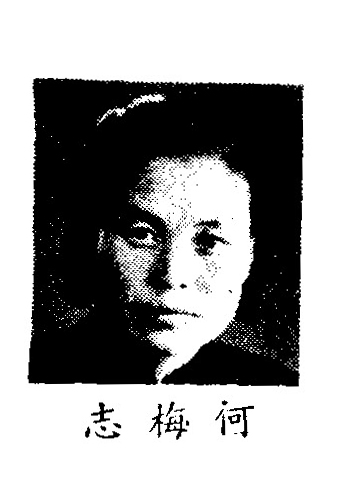

He Meizhi (Chinese: 何梅志, born 1911) was a Chinese politician. Although she was initially among the first group of women elected to the Legislative Yuan in 1948, her election was subsequently declared invalid.

== Biography ==
Originally from Fengning County in Rehe Province, He became a teacher and was headmistress of Rehe Provincial Girls' High School. She was a delegate to the 1946 Constituent National Assembly that drew up the constitution of the Republic of China, and served on the Rehe Provincial Senate.

He contested the 1948 elections to the Legislative Yuan in Rehe province and was initially declared elected. However, the other woman elected from Rehe province, Li Hui-min claimed that He's election was invalid as she had not resigned from her role at Rehe Provincial Girls' High School five months prior to the election, as required by article 13 of the Election Act and had also used pupils at the school to promote her candidacy. The High Court of Rehe Province ruled that He had violated the electoral act, and she was replaced in parliament by Wang Zhebin.
