= Ling Yingzhen =

Chinese politician (1913–1981)

- 凌英貞
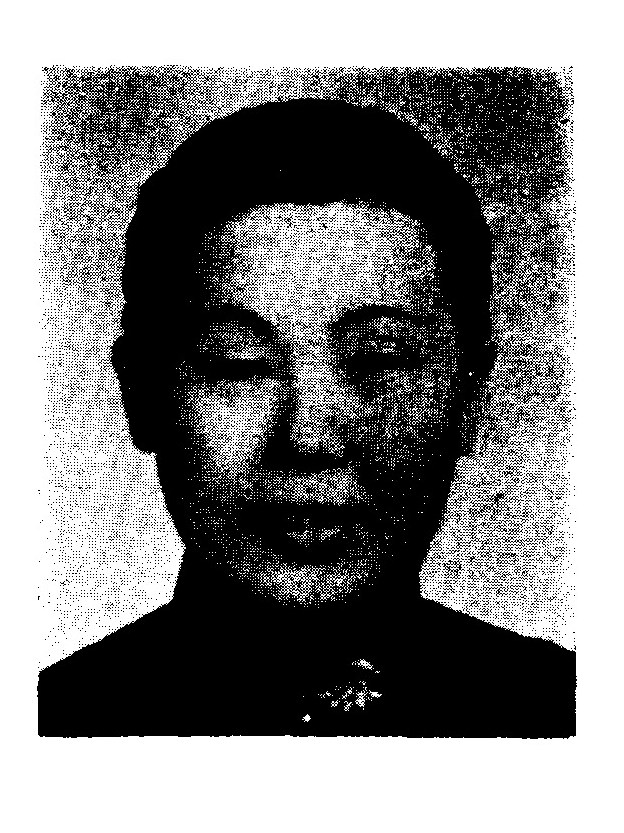
- Ling Yingzhen in 1953

Member of the Legislative Yuan
- In office 1948–1981
- Constituency: Women's Trade Unions

Personal details
- Born: 20 July 1913
- Died: 8 September 1981 (aged 68)

Ling Yingzhen (Chinese: 凌英貞, 20 July 1913 – 8 September 1981) was a Chinese politician. She was among the first group of women elected to the Legislative Yuan in 1948.

== Biography ==
Originally from Shanghai County, Ling graduated from the University of Shanghai and worked as an advisor at the Ministry of Social Affairs.

A member of the Central Women's Trade Union, Ling was elected to the Legislative Yuan as a representative of women's trade unions in the 1948 elections. She relocated to Taiwan during the Chinese Civil War, where she remained a member of the Legislative Yuan until her death in 1981.
