= Huang Peilan =

Chinese politician

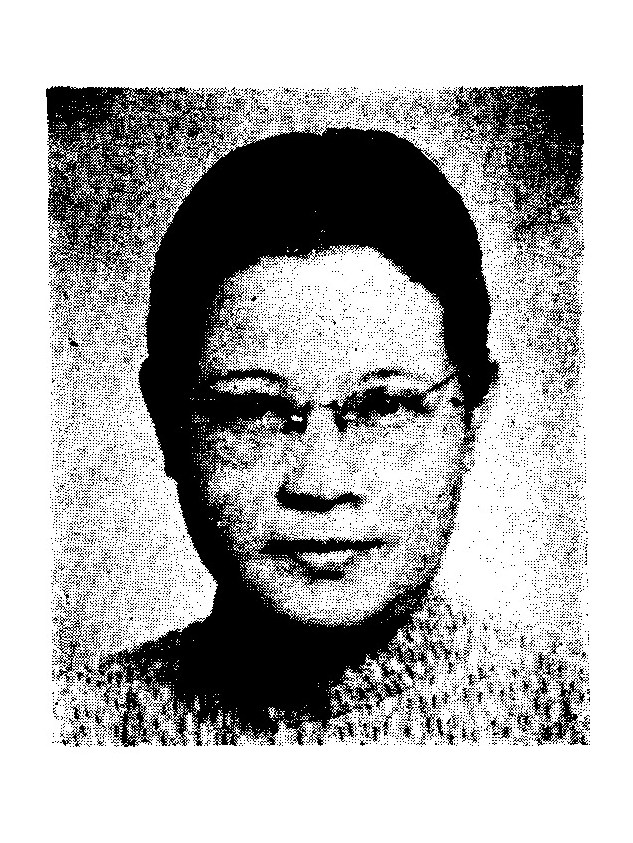

Member of the Legislative Yuan
- In office 1948–1962
- Constituency: Guangdong

Personal details
- Born: 1908
- Died: 1 November 1962 (aged 53–54)

Huang Peilan (Chinese: 黃佩蘭, 1908 – 1 November 1962) was a Chinese politician. She was among the first group of women elected to the Legislative Yuan in 1948.

== Biography ==
Huang was born 1908 and was originally from Dongguan in Guangdong province. She attended Beiping University and subsequently worked for the government, serving as secretary of the Kuomintang's women's committee and head girls' primary and middle schools in Nanjing. She became a member of the Women's Advisory Committee, becoming head of its Life Guidance division.

Huang was a delegate to the 1946 Constituent National Assembly that drew up the constitution of the Republic of China. She was a member of the Guangdong provincial Senate and contested the 1948 elections for the Legislative Yuan as a Kuomintang candidate in Guangdong, winning a seat in parliament. She relocated to Taiwan during the Chinese Civil War, where she remained a member of the Legislative Yuan until her death in 1962.
