= Shih Min-chi =

Chinese agriculture expert and politician

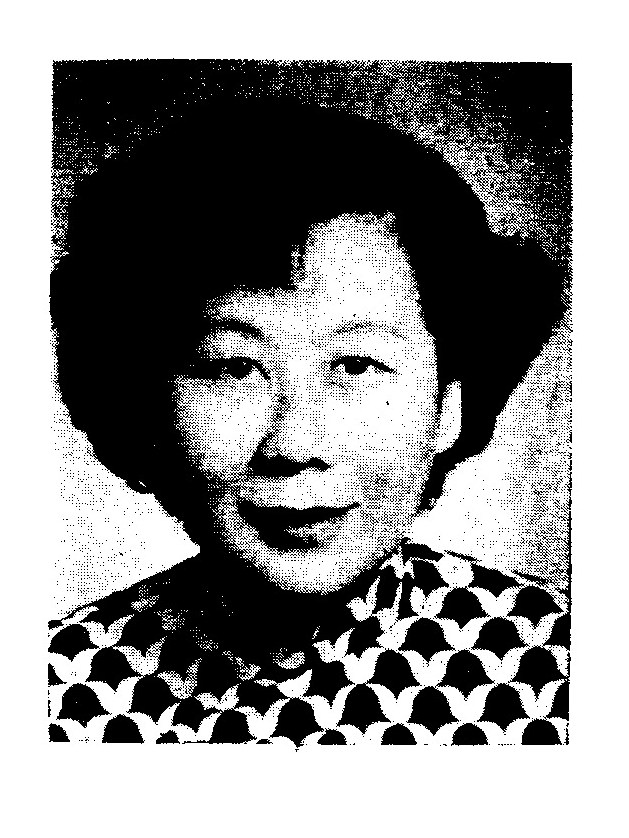

Member of the Legislative Yuan
- In office 1948–
- Constituency: Agricultural Associations

Personal details
- Born: September 1914

Shih Min-chi (Chinese: 史敏濟, born September 1914) was a Chinese agriculture expert and politician. She was one of the first group of women elected to the Legislative Yuan in 1948.

== Biography ==
Originally from Panyu County in Guangdong, Shih attended Zhixin high school and then studied at Sun Yat-sen University in Guanzhou and the Peking University College of Agriculture. She subsequently worked in the Nanjing Central Agricultural Laboratory, the Cornell University Research Institute and as a technician in the Ministry of Agriculture and Forestry, eventually becoming a professor at Sun Yat-sen University. She also served as headteacher of Jianru Middle School and chair of Aiqun and Dafu primary schools.

She became a member of the central committee of the Ministry of Agriculture and Industry and served as executive director of Guangdong Provincial Farmers' Association. In the 1948 elections to the Legislative Yuan, 18 seats were elected by agricultural organisations, two of which were reserved for women. Shih was one of the two elected, becoming one of the first group of women in the Legislative Yuan. She subsequently relocated to Taiwan during the Chinese Civil War.
