= Hsing Shu-yen =

Chinese politician

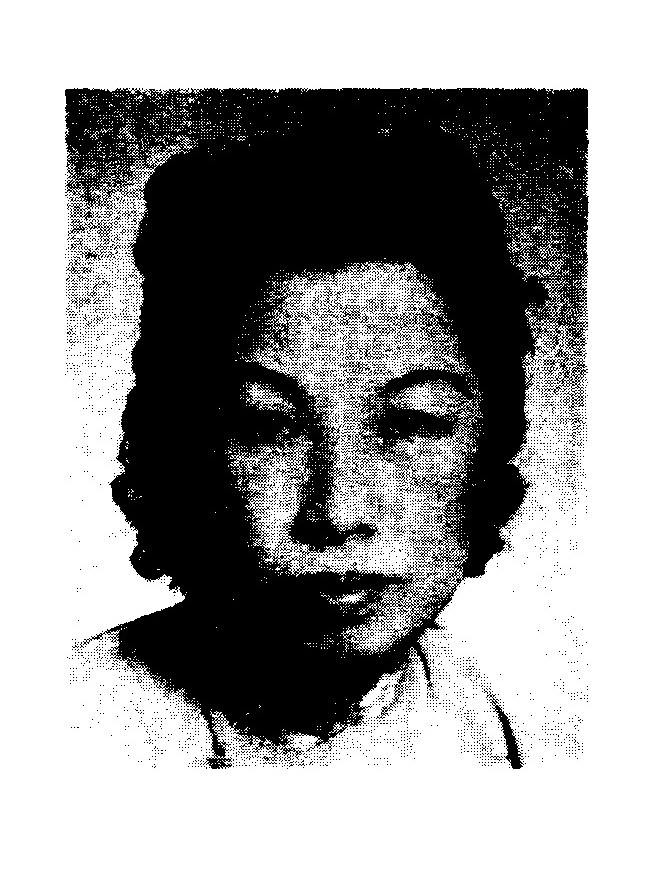

Member of the Legislative Yuan
- In office 1948–1991
- Constituency: Dalian

Personal details
- Born: 1914 (age 111–112)

Hsing Shu-yen (Chinese: 邢淑孍, born 1914) was a Chinese politician. She was among the first group of women elected to the Legislative Yuan in 1948.

== Biography ==
Originally from Dalian, Hsing graduated from the Department of Economics at National Northeastern University. She became a teacher at Lanzhou Middle School. She also served as a member of the northeast branch of the Chinese Women's Affairs Committee, director of Dalian Women's Affairs Committee and a committee member of the Northeast Women's Magazine.

Hsing was a Kuomintang candidate in Dalian in the 1948 elections for the Legislative Yuan and was elected to parliament. Her husband Wang Qiamin was also elected as a representative of Dalian. She relocated to Taiwan during the Chinese Civil War, where she graduated from the Institute of Revolutionary Practice. She remained a member of the Legislative Yuan until 1991.
