= Chen Mingxian =

Chinese politician

Member of the Legislative Yuan
- In office 1948–1951
- Constituency: Guizhou

Personal details
- Born: 1903
- Died: 1983

Chen Mingxian (Chinese: 陳明仙, 1903–1983) was a Chinese politician. She was among the first group of women elected to the Legislative Yuan in 1948.

== Biography ==
Born in 1903, Chen graduated from Guiyang Women's Normal University, after which she worked for the Guizhou Investigation and Statistics Office of the Kuomintang. During the 1930s she became chair of the Guizhou Provincial Women's Movement and director of its publication Guizhou Women.

In the 1948 parliamentary elections she was elected to the Legislative Yuan from a reserved seat for women in Guizhou. Her membership of the legislature was cancelled in 1951 after she failed to attend the fourth session. She became a librarian in the Guizhou Provincial Museum of Literature and History in 1980 and died three years later.
