= Ji Qingyi =

Chinese politician and educator

Member of the Legislative Yuan
- In office 1948–1966
- Constituency: Heilongjiang

Personal details
- Born: 3 September 1904
- Died: 11 January 1998 (aged 93)

Ji Qingyi (Chinese: 紀清漪, 3 September 1904 – 11 January 1998) was a Chinese politician. She was among the first group of women elected to the Legislative Yuan in 1948.

== Biography ==
Born in 1904, Ji was originally from Xian County in Hebei province. After being educated at Heihe Number 1 Primary School, she attended Qiqihar Number 1 Women's Teacher's College and then attended a foundation course at Peking Normal University, after which she studied in the Department of Political Science at Peking University. She subsequently worked as a teacher, as well as editing a supplement in North China Daily and serving as editor-in-chief of New Northeast, a bimonthly publication of Peking University. In 1932 she opened a law firm, becoming the first woman lawyer in Peking. She became Executive Director of the Peking Lawyers Association and established the Xinsheng Women's Vocational School.

Ji was a delegate to the 1946 Constituent National Assembly that drew up the constitution of the Republic of China. She was subsequently a candidate in Heilongjiang Province in the 1948 elections to the Legislative Yuan, in which she was elected to parliament. She remained in China after the Chinese Civil War and her membership of the Legislative Yuan was cancelled in 1966. She later worked as a librarian at the Beijing Municipal Research Centre for Literature and History. She died in 1998.
