= Chang Ping-chiang =

Chinese politician

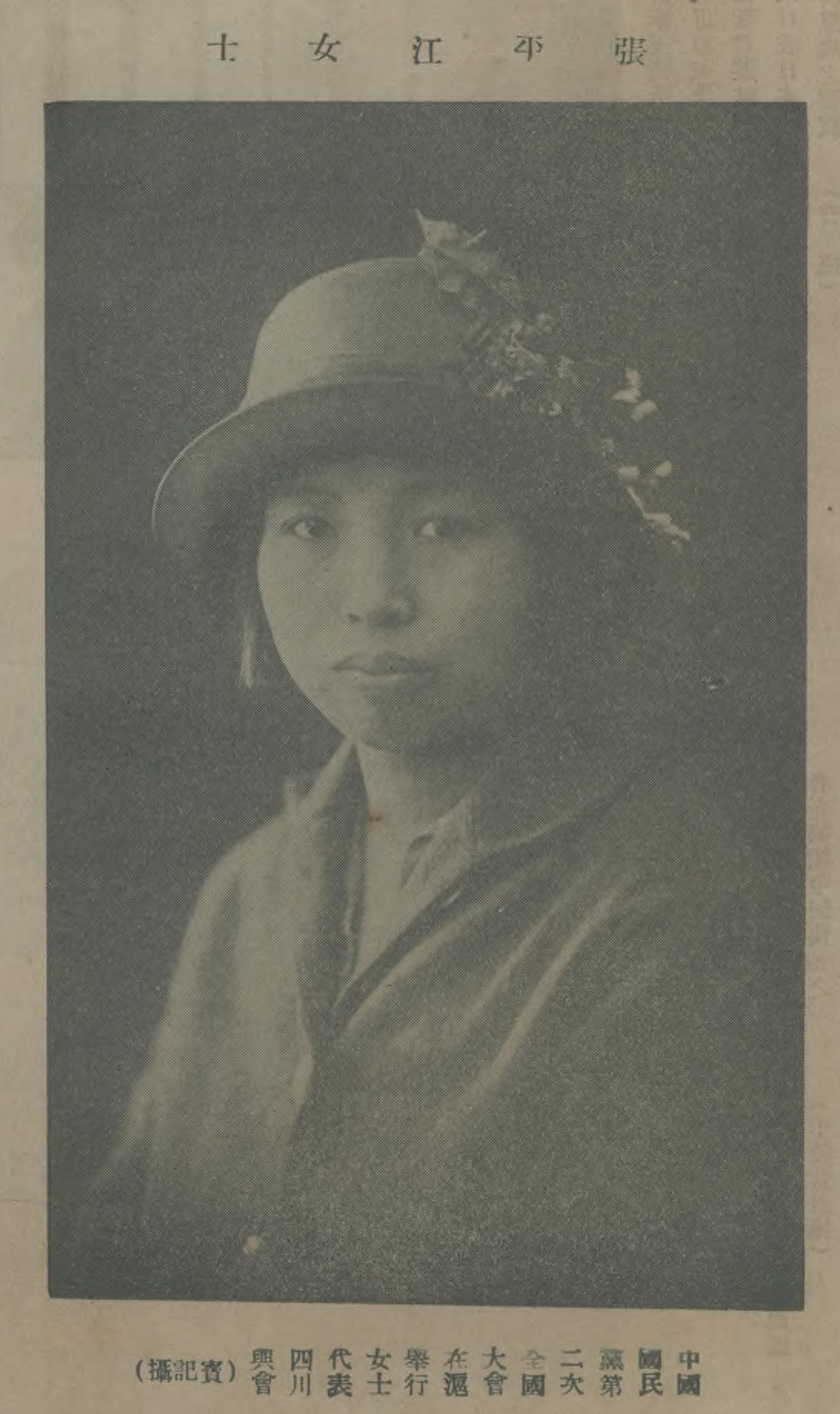

Member of the Legislative Yuan
- In office 1948–1951
- Constituency: Women's Trade Unions

Member of the National People's Congress
- In office 1964–1965
- Constituency: Sichuan

Personal details
- Born: 1902
- Died: 21 January 1975

Chang Ping-chiang (Chinese: 張平江, 1902 – 21 January 1975) was a Chinese politician. She was among the first group of women elected to the Legislative Yuan in 1948. Remaining in China after the Civil War, she later served as a delegate to the third National People's Congress.

== Biography ==
Originally from Guang'an County in Sichuan province, Chang attended Yuechi County Girls' High School and then Chengdu No. 1 Women's Normal School and Peking Women's Higher Normal School, where she was elected chair of the Student Self-Government Association. A member of the Kuomintang, she became the head of women's affairs in the Shanghai branch of the party. She also became personal secretary to Soong Ching Ling, the wife of Kuomintang leader Sun Yat-sen and served as headmistress of Shanghai Huiping Middle School.

Returning to Sichuan, Chang became chair of the provincial Women's Movement Committee of the Kuomintang and headmistress of Guang'an County Girls' Middle School. She was appointed to the Sichuan Province Provisional Senate and in the 1948 elections for the Legislative Yuan, was elected as a women's representative of trade unions. After being elected, she sat on the Education and Culture, Labour and Political and Local Autonomy committees. She remained in China after the Chinese Civil War and became a member of the Sichuan Provincial committee of the Chinese People's Political Consultative Conference. In 1964–65 she was a delegate to the 3rd National People's Congress. She died in 1975.
