= Cheng Xiu =

Chinese politician

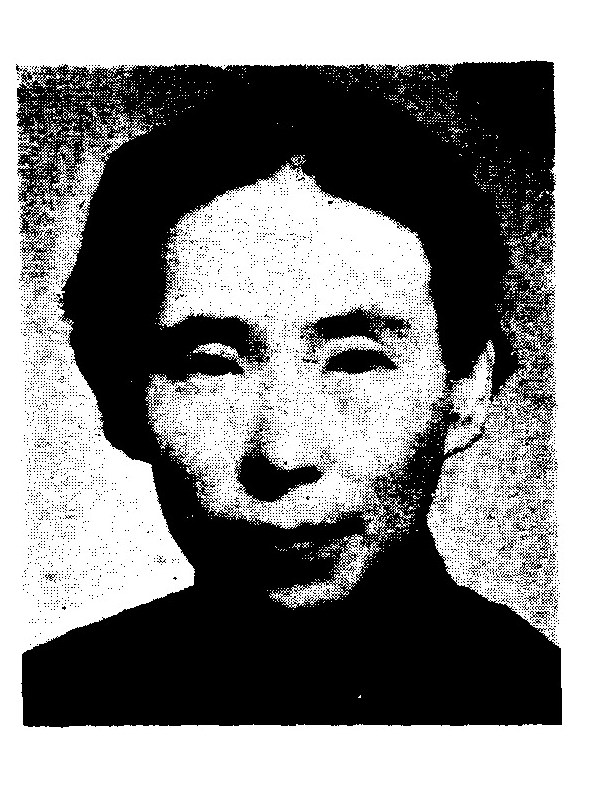

Member of the Legislative Yuan
- In office 1948–1956
- Constituency: Jiangxi

Personal details
- Died: 1 April 1967

Cheng Xiu (Chinese: 程琇, died 1 April 1967) was a Chinese politician. She was among the first group of women elected to the Legislative Yuan in 1948.

== Biography ==
Originally from Duchang County in Jiangxi province, Cheng was the niece of Cheng Tianfang. She obtained an LLD from the Nancy-Université in France, worked at the National Institute for Compilation and Translation and was a professor at National Chung Cheng University. She was a member of the Jiangxi Women's Association and the Jiangxi branch of the Women's Movement Committee.

Cheng was a Kuomintang candidate in Jiangxi province in the 1948 elections for the Legislative Yuan and was elected to parliament. She relocated to Taiwan during the Chinese Civil War, where she remained a member of the Legislative Yuan. In 1956 she was convicted of fraud and sentenced to a year in prison and a loss of civic rights for two years. She appealed to the High Court but lost, resulting in her membership of parliament being cancelled. She died on 1 April 1967.
