= Zhuang Jing =

Chinese politician

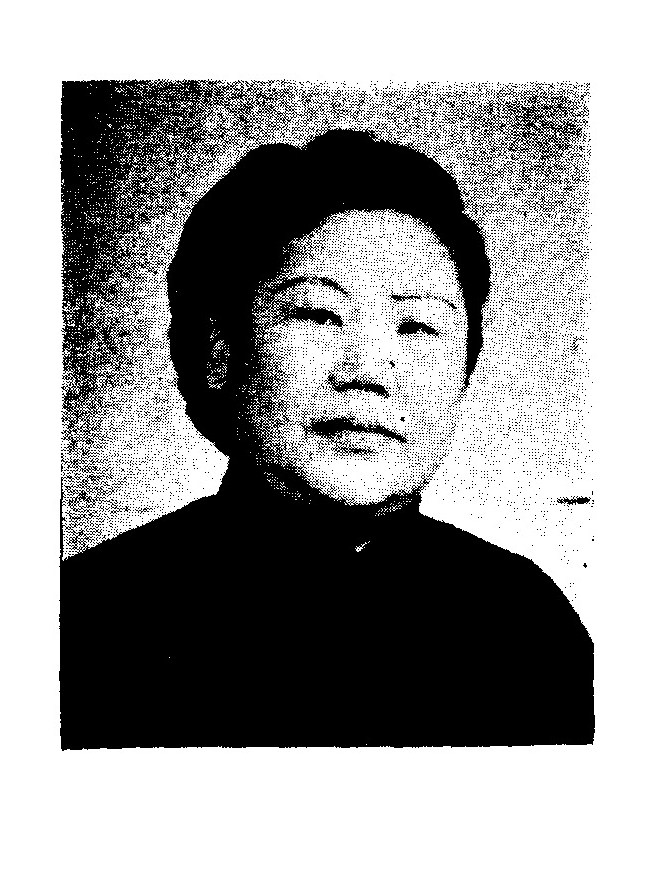

Member of the Legislative Yuan
- In office 1948–1972
- Constituency: Jiangsu

Personal details
- Born: 31 August 1909
- Died: 2 May 1972 (aged 62)

Zhuang Jing (Chinese: 莊靜, 31 August 1909 – 2 May 1972) was a Chinese politician. She was one of the first group of women elected to the Legislative Yuan in 1948.

== Biography ==
Zhuang was born in 1909, originally from Pi County in Jiangsu Province. In 1926 she graduated from Shanghai Women's Literature College, and in 1928 graduated from Shanghai Southern University. She joined the Kuomintang and became secretary of the women's department in Jiangsu. She was also the principal of Beiping Private Women's Vocational College and director of the Beiping Municipal Women's Almshouse.

Having served as a delegate to the Constituent National Assembly that drew up the Constitution of the Republic of China, Zhuang was elected to the Legislative Yuan from Jiangsu in the 1948 parliamentary elections. She relocated to Taiwan during the Chinese Civil War and remained a member of the legislature until her death in 1972.
