= Hu Manqi =

Chinese politician

Member of the Legislative Yuan
- In office 1948–1950
- Constituency: Henan

Personal details
- Born: 17 August 1913
- Died: 27 September 2015 (aged 102) Suzhou, China

Hu Manqi (Chinese: 胡曼奇, 17 August 1913 – 27 September 2015) was a Chinese politician. She was among the first group of women elected to the Legislative Yuan in 1948.

== Biography ==
Originally from Kaifeng in Henan province, Hu became a primary school teacher. She also chaired the Henan Women's Association and became an officer for the Kuomintang in Kaifeng.

A member of the third Provisional Senate of Henan Province, she was a candidate in Henan in the 1948 elections to the Legislative Yuan, in which she was elected to parliament. After she failed to report for the fifth session, her membership of the legislature was cancelled. From 1949 she lived in Suzhou, where she died in 2015.
