= Lou Yiwen =

Chinese politician

Member of the Legislative Yuan
- In office 1948–1951
- Constituency: Guangxi

Lou Yiwen (Chinese: 樓亦文) was a Chinese politician. She was among the first group of women elected to the Legislative Yuan in 1948.

== Biography ==
Originally from Yuyao in Zhejiang Province, Lou attended Peking Women's Normal University and later studied in France. In 1931 she married Huang Yanzhen.

In the 1948 elections to the Legislative Yuan, Lou was a candidate in Guangxi Province and was elected to parliament. After she failed to attend the fifth and six sessions, her membership was cancelled in 1951; the whereabouts of her substitute Wang Ruihua was unknown and the seat left vacant.
