= Xia Jingru =

Chinese politician

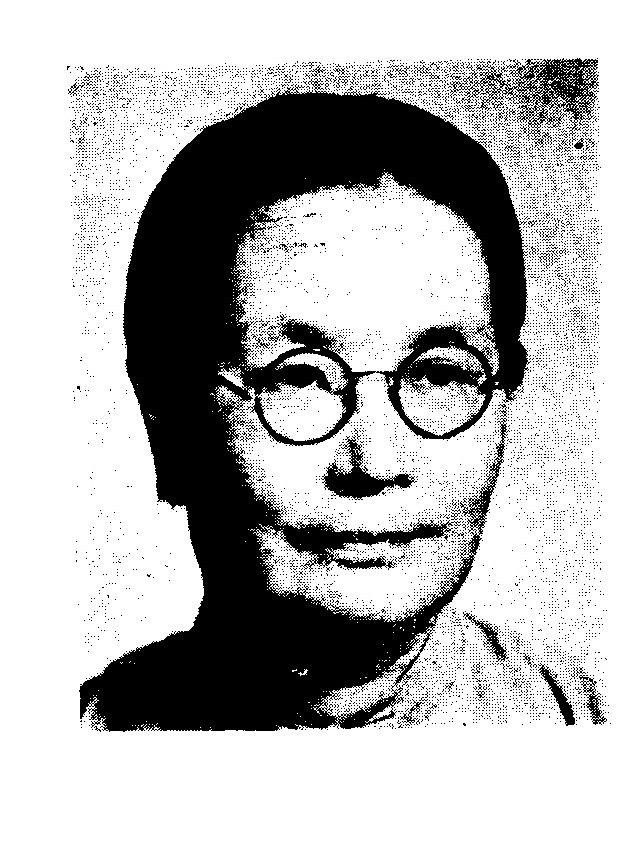

Member of the Legislative Yuan
- In office 1948–1974
- Constituency: Tianjin

Personal details
- Born: 1893
- Died: 7 July 1974 (aged 80–81)

Xia Jingru (Chinese: 夏景如, 1893 – 7 July 1974) was a Chinese educator and politician. She was among the first group of women elected to the Legislative Yuan in 1948.

== Biography ==
Originally from Shouguang County in Shandong province, Xia attended Jinan University and Hebei Provincial Female Teachers College, where she graduated from the Department of Chinese Language and Literature. She became headmistress of Tianjin Private Shenggong Girls' High School and Tianjin Renai Nursing School and founded schools in Tianjin, Qingdao and Jinan.

Xia was a Kuomintang candidate in Tianjin in the 1948 elections for the Legislative Yuan and was elected to parliament. She relocated to Taiwan during the Chinese Civil War and remained a member of the Legislative Yuan until her death in 1974.
