= Wang Ai-fen =

Chinese politician

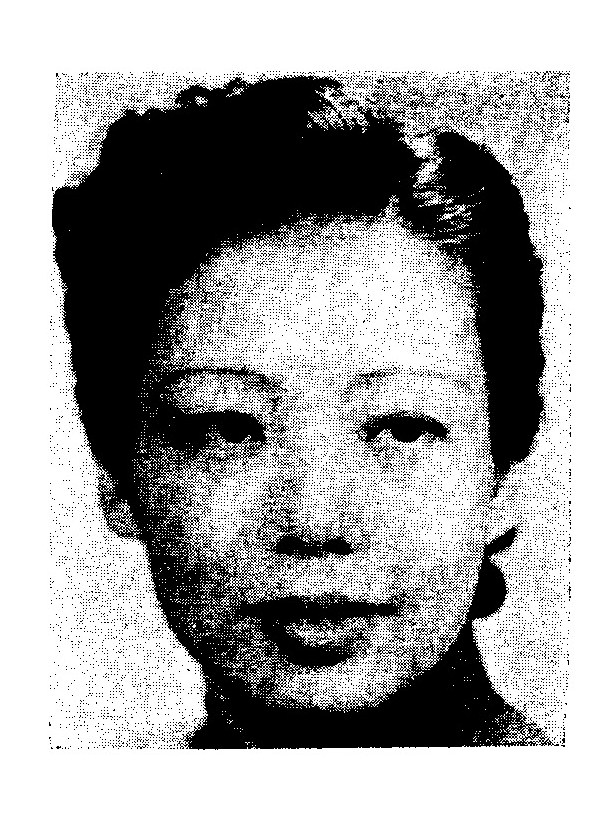

Member of the Legislative Yuan
- In office 1948–
- Constituency: Beiping

Personal details
- Born: 1912

Wang Ai-fen (Chinese: 王靄芬, born 1912) was a Chinese educator and politician. She was among the first group of women elected to the Legislative Yuan in 1948.

== Biography ==
Originally from Xiaoshan County in Zhejiang Province, Wang studied at the Peking University, graduating from the Department of Foreign Languages and Literature. She then studied for a master's degree at the University of Paris. Returning to China, she worked as a lecturer at Peking University and Fu Jen Catholic University, later becoming a professor at the University of Shanghai. She was appointed chair of the Beiping Women's Anti-Japanese National Salvation League and became involved with the New Life Movement, serving as director general of its women's section in Beiping. After serving on Beiping municipal council, she was one of the first elected members of Beiping City Council.

In the 1948 elections for the Legislative Yuan, she was a Kuomintang candidate in Beiping and was elected to parliament. She relocated to Taiwan during the Chinese Civil War, where she remained a member of the Legislative Yuan and became a professor at National Taiwan Normal University. She also taught at Shih Hsin University and Tamkang University.

Wang was married twice, to Fang Xianxu and later Duan Maolan, a diplomat who served as ambassador to several countries.
