= Wang Chunbi =

Chinese politician

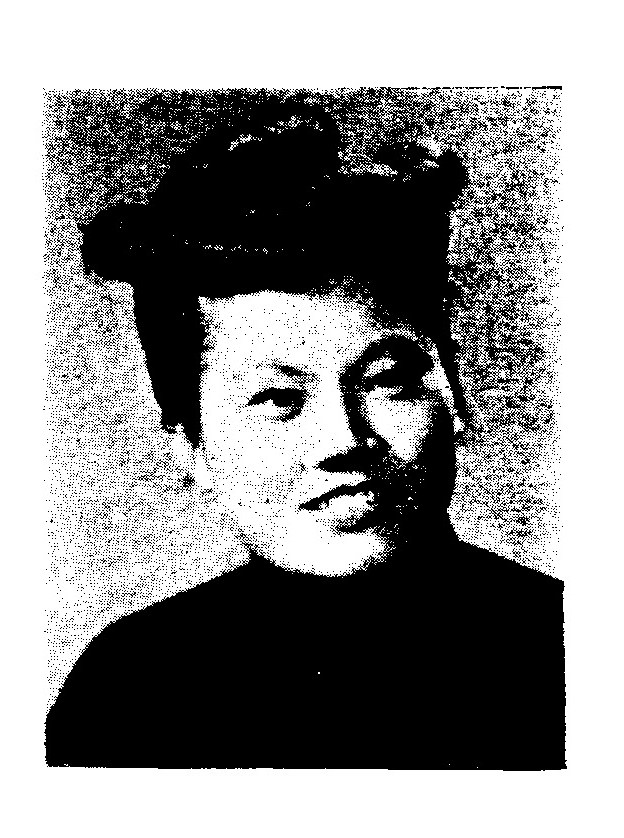

Member of the Legislative Yuan
- In office 1948–1981
- Constituency: Sichuan

Personal details
- Born: 25 April 1916
- Died: 25 July 1981 (aged 65)

Wang Chunbi (Chinese: 王純碧, 25 April 1916 – 25 July 1981) was a Chinese educator and politician. She was among the first group of women elected to the Legislative Yuan in 1948.

== Biography ==
Born in 1916, Wang was originally from Lanjiang in Suining County, Sichuan province. Her father died when she was young and she was raised by her mother, who hired a missionary to teach her. She was educated at Huaying Girls' Middle School in Chengdu and later attended Sichuan University, where she earned a bachelor of education degree. During her studies her brother asked her to return home to get married, but she refused. When her brother cut off her funding, she went to court and won the rights to part of the property left by her father in Xiajiaba.

After graduating Wang taught in schools in Chengdu and was appointed headteacher of Neijiang County Normal School and the high school affiliated with Chenghua University. She married her former classmate Wang Hui in 1933. She later became a lecturer at Sichuan University and headed Jiangbei Provincial Women Teachers School. She also served on the committee of Sichuan Provincial Museum of Education and Science.

In the 1948 elections for the Legislative Yuan, Wang was a Kuomintang candidate in Sichuan, and was elected to parliament. She relocated to Taiwan during the Chinese Civil War, where she became a member of the Institute of Revolutionary Practice. She remained a member of the Legislative Yuan until her death in 1981.
