= Ni Yujie =

Chinese politician

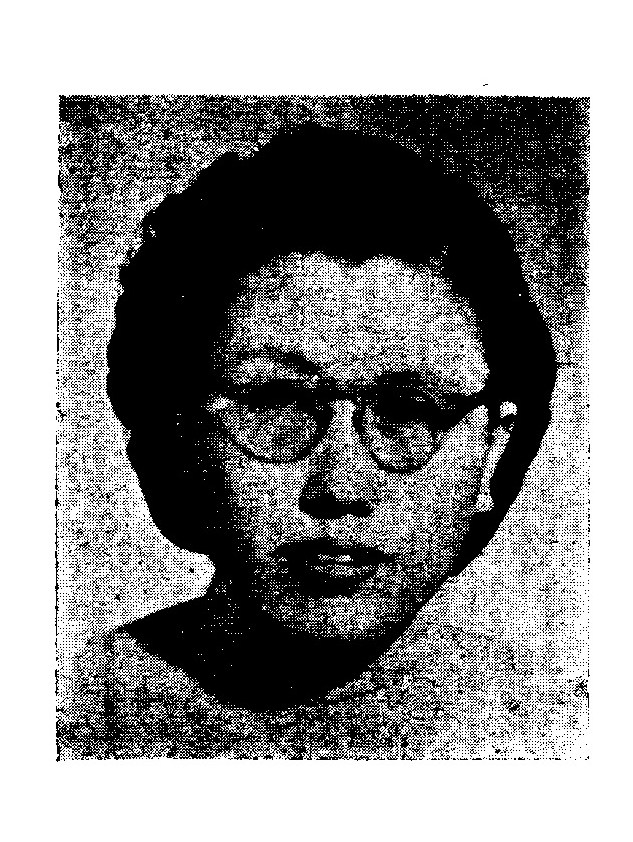

Member of the Legislative Yuan
- In office 1948–1974
- Constituency: Songjiang

Personal details
- Born: 2 June 1914
- Died: 8 May 1974 (aged 59)

Ni Yujie (Chinese: 倪玉潔, 2 June 1914 – 8 May 1974) was a Chinese accountant and politician. She was among the first group of women elected to the Legislative Yuan in 1948.

== Biography ==
Originally from the village of Longjing in Yanji County in Songjiang Province, Ni attended National Chengchi University, where she graduated from the Department of Finance. She subsequently worked as an accountant, rising to become director of the Tax Collection Office of Wuyi County in Zhejiang Province. She also served as Director of Accounting at Chongqing University and National Wuhan University. She also served as deputy principal of the accountancy school of the Nanjing branch of the China Accounting Society.

In the 1948 elections to the Legislative Yuan, Ni was a Kuomintang candidate in Songjiang and was elected to parliament. She relocated to Taiwan during the Chinese Civil War, where she became director of the Taiwan Provincial Institute of Accountants. She remained a member of parliament until her death in 1974.
