= Chao Mao-hua =

Chinese politician (1896–1985)

Member of the Legislative Yuan
- In office 1948–1951
- Constituency: Sichuan

Personal details
- Born: 1896
- Died: 1985

Chao Mao-hua (Chinese: 趙懋華, 1896–1985) was a Chinese politician. She was one of the first group of women elected to the Legislative Yuan in 1948.

== Biography ==
Chao was born in 1896 and was originally from Nanxi County in Sichuan province. She attended Beiyang Women's Normal School, and in 1920 became one of the first nine women admitted to Peking University. She married Liang Yingwen, and after graduating, studied at the University of Berlin in Germany, where she earned a PhD, publishing her thesis Die Ethik der Schule Schopenhauers under the name Esther Mon-Hua Liang. While in Europe she travelled to several countries to inspect schools and social education.

Returning to China, she became a member of the National Resources Commission. In 1935 she was appointed to the fourth Legislative Yuan and co-founded the National Women's Steering Committee with Soong Mei-ling. Following the outbreak of the Second Sino-Japanese War in 1937, the two also founded the Chinese Women's Service and Self-Defence Anti-Japanese War Soldiers Association. She was awarded the Medal of Victory twice during the war and in 1946 was awarded the Order of Brilliant Star.

In the 1948 elections for the Legislative Yuan, Chao was a candidate in Sichuan province and was elected to parliament. She subsequently sat on the Political and Local Government Committee and was convenor of the Education and Culture Committee. Her membership was cancelled in 1951 after she failed to report for the sixth session and was deemed to have resigned. She died in 1985.
