= Ma Runmin =

Chinese politician

Member of the Legislative Yuan
- In office 1948–1951
- Succeeded by: Wang Hua-min
- Constituency: Hebei

Ma Runmin (Chinese: 马润民) was a Chinese politician. She was among the first group of women elected to the Legislative Yuan in 1948.

== Biography ==
Ma worked as a teacher. In 1924 she was forced to resign from her position at the No. 2 Women's Normal School when the dean was ordered to rid the school of progressive teachers. She later became headteacher of a school in Peking, where she worked until 1948.

She was a candidate in Hebei in the 1948 elections for the Legislative Yuan, and was elected to parliament. After being elected, she sat on the Education and Culture Committee, the Political and Local Autonomy Committee and the Social Committee. Her membership of the Legislative Yuan was cancelled in 1951 after she failed to attend the fifth session of parliament and she was replaced by Wang Hua-min.
