= Wang Tung-chen =

Chinese politician

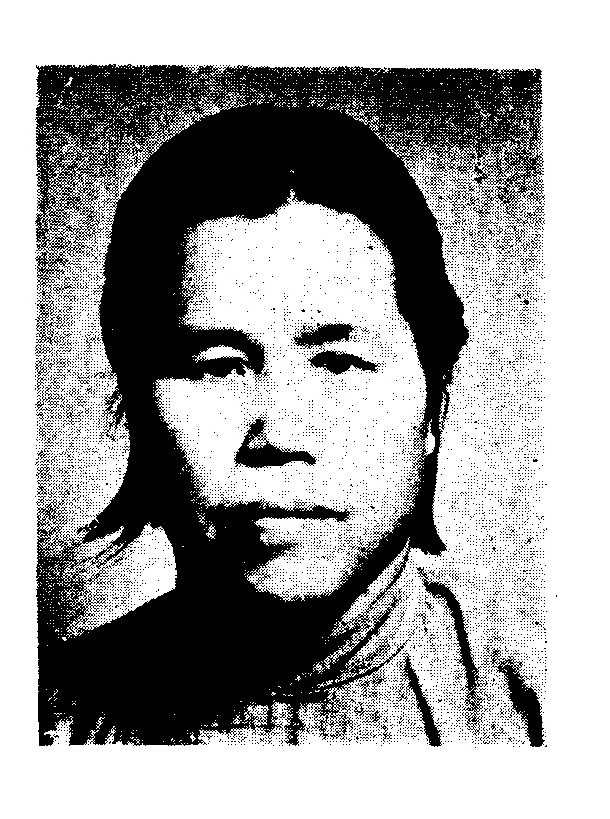

Member of the Legislative Yuan
- In office 1948–1976
- Constituency: Hebei

Personal details
- Born: 5 December 1898
- Died: 25 September 1977 (aged 78)

Wang Tung-chen (Chinese: 王冬珍, 5 December 1898 – 25 September 1977) was a Chinese politician. She was among the first group of women elected to the Legislative Yuan in 1948.

== Biography ==
Wang was born in 1898. Originally from Hebei province, she attended Zhili Provincial Tianjin Women's Normal School. She subsequently graduated from Hebei Provincial Women's Teachers College and earned a degree in politics and economics at Waseda University in Japan. She became head of Shaanxi Ankang Teachers' Training College and was a political instructor for the Northwest Training Corps of the Kuomintang's Central Training Corps.

Wang was a Kuomintang candidate in Hebei in the 1948 elections for the Legislative Yuan, and was elected to parliament. Her husband Han Chen-sheng was also elected from Hebei. The couple relocated to Taiwan during the Chinese Civil War, where she remained a member of the Legislative Yuan until her death in 1977.
