= Lee Ju-tsung =

Taiwanese politician

Lee Ju-tsung (Chinese: 李儒聰; 1912–2006) was a Taiwanese politician.

Lee was a member of the Taipei County Council from 1951 to 1968, and served as its speaker from 1964. In 1969, he was elected to the Legislative Yuan as a permanent legislator representing Taiwan Province. Lee left office when the First Legislative Yuan stepped down as part of constitutional reforms passed in 1991. He died on 26 October 2006. Presidential Decree #6718, acknowledging Lee's death, was formally issued by Chen Shui-bian and premier Su Tseng-chang on 6 December 2006.
