= Bai Lianzhen =

Chinese politician (born 1921)

Member of the Legislative Yuan
- In office 1948–1950
- Succeeded by: Li Qing
- Constituency: Hulunbuir

Personal details
- Born: 1921

Bai Lianzhen (Chinese: 白蓮貞, born 1921) was a Chinese politician. She was one of the first group of women elected to the Legislative Yuan in 1948.

== Life and career ==
Bai was educated at Nanjing Xiaozhuang Mengzang School. A member of the Kuomintang, she contested the 1948 legislative elections and was elected to the Legislative Yuan from Hulunbuir. After becoming an MP, she sat on the Political and Local Self-Government Committee, the Finance and Financial Committee, and the Border Committee.

She resigned from the Legislative Yuan in 1950 and was replaced by Li Qing.
