= Yu Ruzhou =

Chinese politician

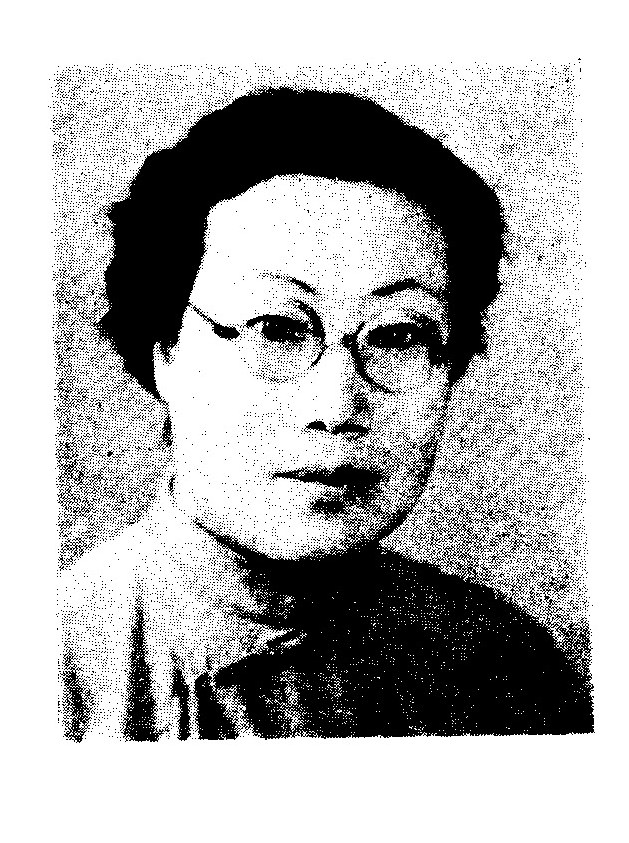
- Yu in 1953

Member of the Legislative Yuan
- In office 1948–1988
- Constituency: Harbin

Personal details
- Born: 30 January 1899 Acheng County, China
- Died: 18 March 1988 (aged 89)

Yu Ruzhou (Chinese: 于汝洲, 30 January 1899 – 18 March 1988) was a Chinese physician and politician. She was among the first group of women elected to the Legislative Yuan in 1948.

== Biography ==
Yu was born in Acheng County in 1899. She attended Peking Union Medical College, Shanghai Medical College and the Shanghai Institute of Human and Obstetrics, after which she became a medical officer for the Harbin Anti-epidemic Affairs Office, Daheihe Epidemic Prevention Hospital and Daheihe Police Department. She later became head of Harbin Songjiang Obstetrics School and Songjiang Hospital. During the Second Sino-Japanese War she served as director of the Wartime Childcare Association and was deputy director of Yichang Wartime Children's Transportation Station.

After the war Yu was a delegate to the 1946 Constituent National Assembly that drew up the constitution of the Republic of China. A member of the executive of the Harbin branch of the Kuomintang, she was a Kuomintang candidate in the city in the 1948 elections for the Legislative Yuan and was elected to parliament. She relocated to Taiwan during the Chinese Civil War, where she remained a member of the Legislative Yuan until her death in 1988.
