= Tung Tao-yun =

Chinese politician

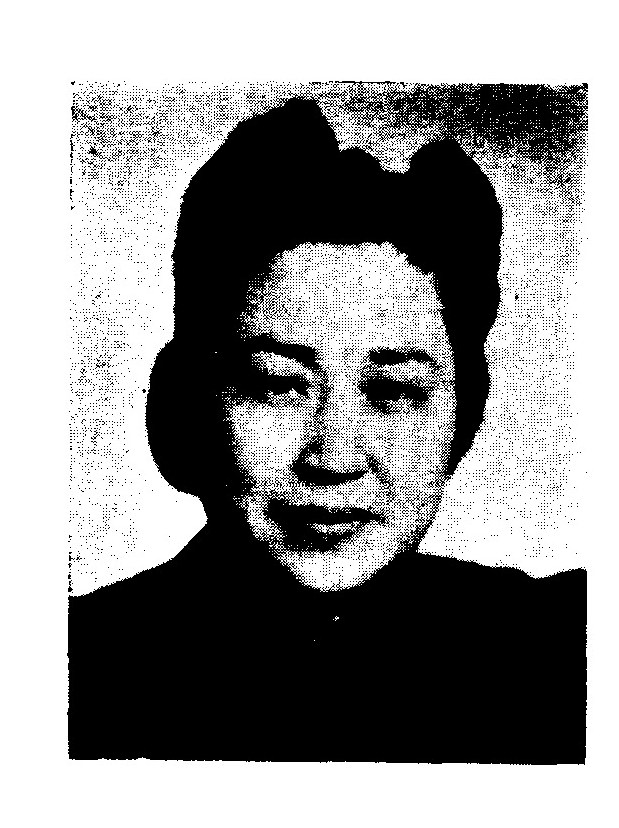

Member of the Legislative Yuan
- In office 1948–1991
- Constituency: Anhui

Tung Tao-yun (Chinese: 仝道雲) was a Chinese educator and politician. She was among the first group of women elected to the Legislative Yuan in 1948.

== Biography ==
Tung attended National Southeast University, where she graduated from the Department of Education. She became headteacher of Boxian County Middle School in Anhui province and was an inspector for the Shaanxi province Department of Education. She also qualified as a lawyer. A graduate of the Kuomintang's Central Training Corps, she became secretary of the party's central department and served on Shanghai City Council.

Tung was a Kuomintang candidate in Anhui in the 1948 elections for the Legislative Yuan, and was elected to parliament, relocating to Taiwan during the Chinese Civil War. She served as executive director of Chinese Muslim Association and of the Taipei Mosque Board.
