= Sun Chi-hsu =

Chinese politician

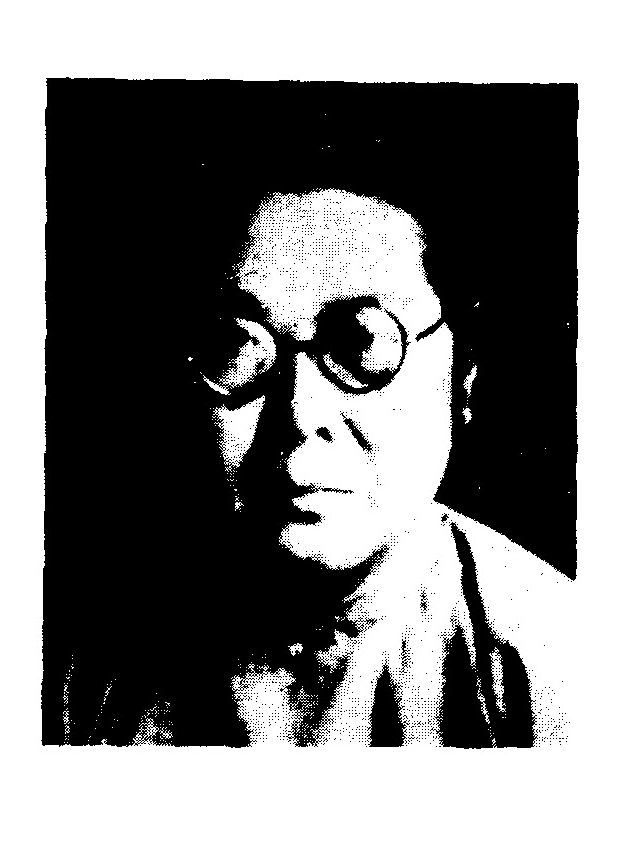

Member of the Legislative Yuan
- In office 1948–1989
- Constituency: Agricultural Associations

Personal details
- Born: 21 February 1897
- Died: 28 January 1989 (aged 91) Taipei, Taiwan

Sun Chi-hsu (Chinese: 孫繼緒, 21 February 1897 – 28 January 1989) was a Chinese educator and politician. She was among the first group of women elected to the Legislative Yuan in 1948.

== Biography ==
Sun was born in 1897, the daughter of the politician Sun Xingyu. Originally from Penglai County in Shandong province, she was educated at Hubei Province Girls' Middle School, graduating in 1917. She then attended Peking National Women's Higher Normal School and graduated from the Department of Chinese Literature. She subsequently taught at Jiangsu No. 1 Girls' High School and became director of Nanjing Girls' High School. She also headed women's teachers schools in Hubei and Sichuan.

In the 1948 elections she was elected to the Legislative Yuan from the Agriculture professional group. She relocated to Taiwan during the Chinese Civil War and remained a member of the Legislative Yuan until her death in 1989.
