= Chou Hui-ying =

Chinese educator, musician, and politician

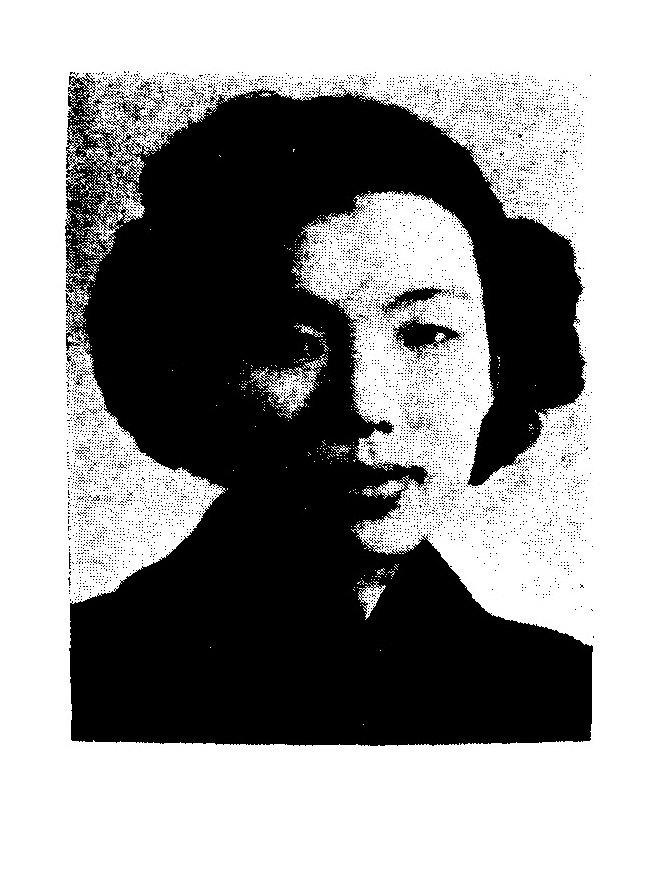

Member of the Legislative Yuan
- In office 1948–
- Constituency: Qinghai

Personal details
- Born: 24 December 1923 Xining, China
- Died: January 2017 (aged 93) Canada

Chou Hui-ying (Chinese: 丑輝瑛, 24 December 1923 – January 2017) was a Chinese educator, musician and politician. She was among the first group of women elected to the Legislative Yuan in 1948.

== Biography ==
Chou was born in Xining in Qinghai Province to a family from the village of Choujia in Fuping County, Shaanxi Province. Her father had moved to Qinghai to run a fur export business. She attended the National Chongqing Music Conservatory and subsequently taught at Qinghai Provincial Xining Middle School and Qinghai Provincial Xining Women's Normal School. She later became secretary of the Qinghai province Department of Education inspectorate.

Chou served as chair of the Qinghai Women's Association and the Qinhai Province women's section of the Kuomintang. She became a member of the Qinhai Provincial Senate, and in the 1948 parliamentary elections, was elected to the Legislative Yuan from Qinghai Province. During the Chinese Civil War she relocated to Taiwan.

Also involved in music, Chou served as executive director of the Chinese Music Society and chair of the Copyright Owners Association. She died in Canada in 2017.
