= Wu Chi-mei =

Chinese politician

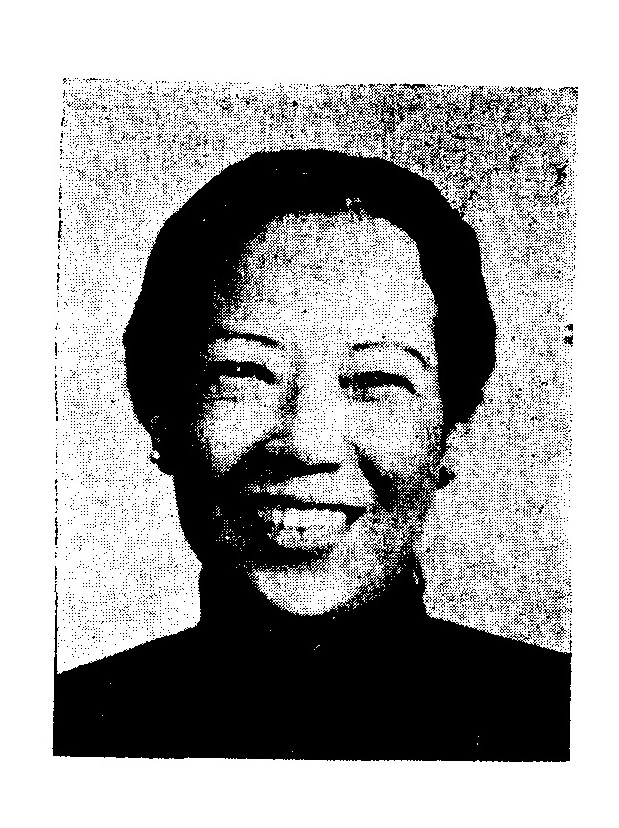

Member of the Legislative Yuan
- In office 1948–1956
- Constituency: Guangzhou

Personal details
- Born: 1898
- Died: 12 November 1956 (aged 57–58)

Wu Chi-mei (Chinese: 伍智梅, 1898 – 12 November 1956) was a Chinese physician and politician. She was among the first group of women elected to the Legislative Yuan in 1948.

== Biography ==
Originally from Doushan in Guangdong, Wu was the daughter of Wu Han-chi, a politician and medical scientist. In 1919 she established the Guangdong Women's Federation, which promoted equality of opportunity in education and employment and petitioned Sun Yat-sen and the Guangdong Provincial Assembly to advance these causes. She attended Hackett Medical College and then worked as a researcher at the University of Chicago School of Medicine after she was sent to the United States, Europe and Singapore by the Guangzhou municipal government to study public health. A member of the Kuomintang, she became a member of the executive committee of the Guangzhou branch of the party and Guangzhou city council. She served on the party's central executive committee and was a member of the second National Political Assembly. She also served as acting head of the Advanced Midwifery School.

Wu was a delegate to the 1946 National Constituent Assembly that drew up the constitution of the Republic of China. She was subsequently a Kuomintang candidate in Guangzhou in the 1948 elections for the Legislative Yuan and was elected to parliament. She relocated to Taiwan during the Chinese Civil War, where she remained a member of the Legislative Yuan until her death in 1956.
