= Tang Kuo-cheng =

Chinese politician

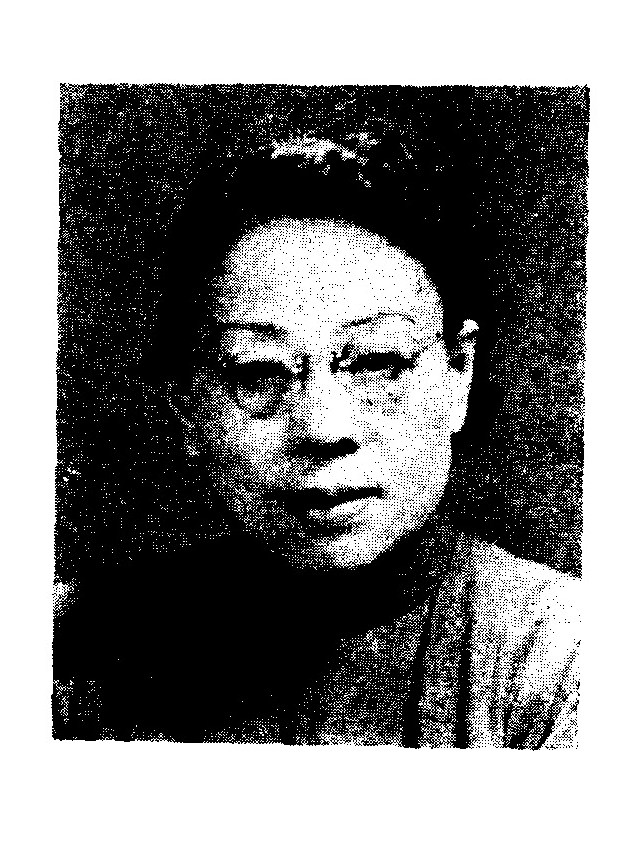

Member of the Legislative Yuan
- In office 1948–1991
- Constituency: Hunan

Tang Kuo-cheng (Chinese: 唐國楨) was a Chinese politician. She was among the first group of women elected to the Legislative Yuan in 1948.

== Biography ==
After graduating from Peking Women's Normal University, Tang became a researcher at Meiji University in Japan. Returning to China, she became headteacher at Ningxia Provincial Girls' High School. She joined the Kuomintang and was a delegate to its sixth national congress. She became a member of the Central Women's Movement Committee and chair of Nanjing Women's Association.

Tang was a delegate to the 1946 Constituent National Assembly that drew up the constitution of the Republic of China. She was subsequently a Kuomintang candidate in Hunan in the 1948 elections for the Legislative Yuan, and was elected to parliament. She relocated to Taiwan during the Chinese Civil War, where she remained a member of the Legislative Yuan until 1991.
