= Ding Chengfang =

Chinese politician

Member of the Legislative Yuan
- In office 1948–1951
- Succeeded by: Wang Xiurui
- Constituency: Anhui

Ding Chengfang (Chinese: 丁澄芳) was a Chinese educator and politician. She was among the first group of women elected to the Legislative Yuan in 1948.

== Biography ==
Originally from Fuyang County in Anhui Province, Ding attended Peking Women's Normal University, after which she became headteacher of Anhui Provincial Central Experimental Primary School. She joined the Kuomintang and became a member of the committee of its women's section in Anhui.

In the 1948 elections to the Legislative Yuan, Ding was a candidate in Anhui Province and was elected to parliament. Although she relocated to Keelung in Taiwan during the Chinese Civil War, she later returned to the mainland with her children and settled in Nanjing. She resigned from the Legislative Yuan in 1951. She subsequently became headteacher of Nanjing No. 19 Middle School and died during the 1980s.
