= Wang Lubing =

Chinese politician

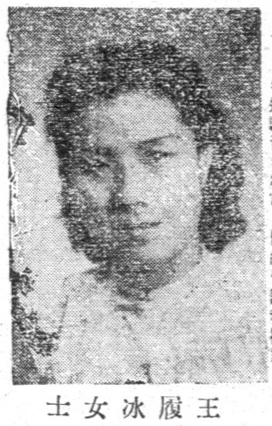

Member of the Legislative Yuan
- In office 1948–1949
- Succeeded by: Gao Yunbin
- Constituency: Chongqing

Personal details
- Died: 1949

Wang Lubing (Chinese: 王履冰, died 1949) was a Chinese politician. She was among the first group of women elected to the Legislative Yuan in 1948.

== Biography ==
Originally from Chongqing, Wang attended Sichuan Provincial Second Girls Normal School. In 1925 she became a member of the executive committee of the Chongqing branch of the Socialist Youth League and head of women's affairs. She later went to Shanghai, where she graduated from the Department of Sociology at Shanghai University. She then studied at Moscow Sun Yat-sen University. During her time in Russia, she was a delegate to the 6th National Congress of the Chinese Communist Party. Returning to China, she became secretary of the Zhabei District committee of the Communist Youth League of China in 1928. In 1931 she became secretary-general of the Jiangsu province committee of the Communist Youth League.

After being arrested in 1933, Wang issued a public statement stating she was leaving the Communist Party, after which the party expelled her. She later joined the Kuomintang and became chair of its women's section in Chongqing. She became a councillor for district six of Chongqing city council and leader of the women's section of the Chongqing branch of Three People's Principles Youth League. In the 1948 elections for the Legislative Yuan, Wang was a candidate in Chongqing, and was elected to parliament. After being elected, she sat on the Finance and Monetary Committee, the Political and Local Autonomy Committee and the Social Committee. She died in 1949.
