= Liu Jie =

Liu Jie, may refer to:

- Liu Jie (politician, born 1915), governor and party chief of Henan.
- Liu Jie (politician, born 1970), the current governor of Zhejiang.
- Liu Jie, alternative name of Canadian-born Chinese ice hockey player Jason Fram
