= Cui Puzhen =

Chinese politician

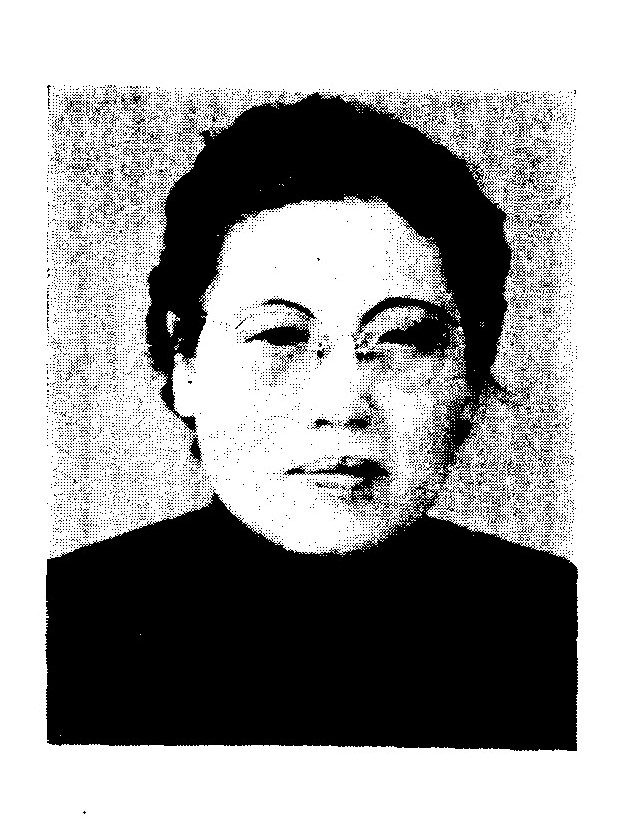

Member of the Legislative Yuan
- In office 1948–1961
- Constituency: Hebei

Personal details
- Born: 1907
- Died: 1961 (aged 53–54)

Cui Puzhen (Chinese: 崔璞珍, 1907–1961) was a Chinese educator and politician. She was among the first group of women elected to the Legislative Yuan in 1948.

== Biography ==
Cui was born in 1907 and was originally from Qingyuan in Hebei province. She attended the Central School of Party Affairs and then graduated from the Faculty of Law at Chaoyang University. She taught at Beiping Beiman Girls' Middle School and became headmistress of Chunan Women's Vocational School. She also served as secretary of the Hubei provincial branch of the Kuomintang.

Cui was a Kuomintang candidate in Hebei in the 1948 elections for the Legislative Yuan and was elected to parliament. She relocated to Taiwan during the Chinese Civil War, where she attended the Institute of Revolutionary Practice. She remained a member of the Legislative Yuan until her death in 1961.
