= Chen Jiujing =

Chinese educator and politician (born 1910)

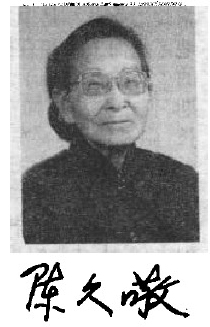

Member of the Legislative Yuan
- In office 1948–1949
- Constituency: Shandong

Personal details
- Born: 1910

Chen Jiujing (Chinese: 陳久敬, born 1910, date of death unknown) was a Chinese educator and politician. She was among the first group of women elected to the Legislative Yuan in 1948.

== Biography ==
Originally from Sichuan Province, Chen was educated at primary and high schools affiliated with Beiping Normal University. She then attended the university, graduating from the English department in 1932. After university, she worked as a teacher in Zhangjiakou. Between 1934 and 1935 she taught at Qingdao Wende Girls' High School. In 1935 she earned a master's degree in English literature from Cornell University and then gained a master's degree in education at Columbia University. After returning to China in 1937, she worked as a professor of English at Kwang Hua University in Chengdu, before moving to Chongqing, where she taught at the Soviet Embassy.

In 1948 she was elected to the Legislative Yuan from a reserved seat for women in Shandong. She joined the Education and Culture Committee, the Finance and Banking Committee and the Foreign Affairs Committee. She fled to Taiwan during the Chinese Civil War, but her husband Li Taihua, a former Minister of Education of Shandong Province, was arrested. However, she returned to the mainland, initially to Guangzhou. After a short spell in Hong Kong, she returned to Beijing in September 1950 and returned to teaching in the Soviet embassy. In 1956 she joined the Revolutionary Committee of the Chinese Kuomintang. She became headmistress of a primary school in 1980 and director of the Beijing Adult Education Association.
