= Cheng Yizhi =

Chinese politician (1902–1997)

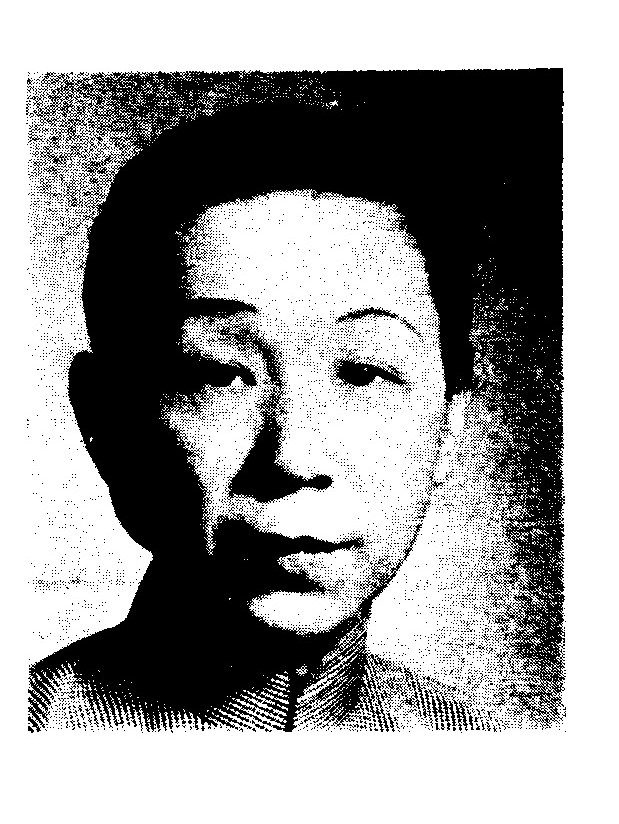
- Cheng in 1953

Member of the Legislative Yuan
- In office 1948–
- Constituency: Universities

Personal details
- Born: 1902 Xiangcheng County, China
- Died: 14 April 1997 (aged 94–95)

Chen Yizhi (Chinese: 程毅志, 1902 – 14 April 1997) was a Chinese politician. She was among the first group of women elected to the Legislative Yuan in 1948.

== Biography ==
Chen was born in Xiangcheng County in Henan Province in 1903. She attended Peking Women's Normal University, where she graduated from the Department of Education. She subsequently taught at the university's high school, where she later became headmistress. She also worked as a professor at the National Women's Normal College and the National School of Oriental Language and Literature, and as an inspector for the Department of Education of Peking municipality and Hebei Province.

As part of the 1948 parliamentary elections, five members were elected to the Legislative Yuan to represent universities, with Chen one of the five elected. She subsequently relocated to Taiwan during the Chinese Civil War.
