= Zhang Guangren =

Chinese politician

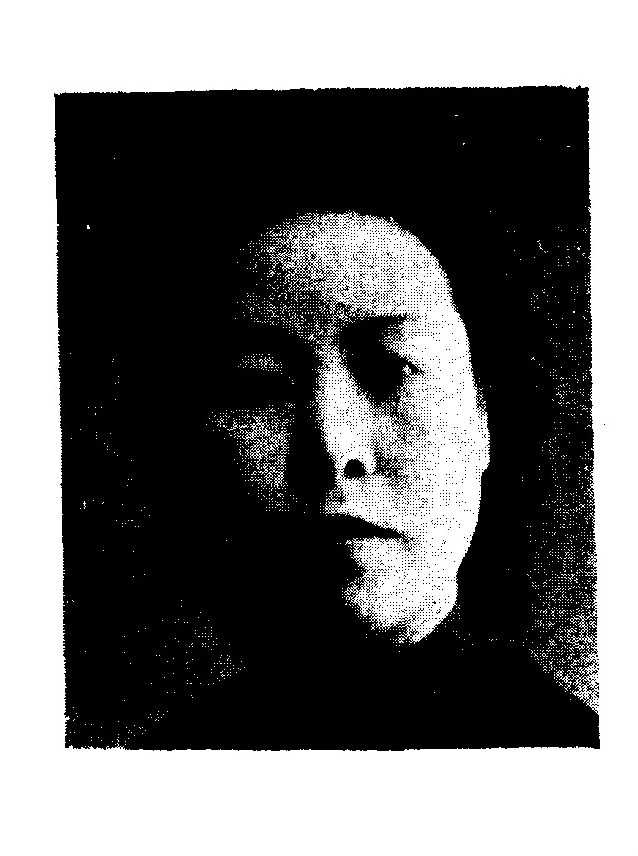

Member of the Legislative Yuan
- In office 1948–
- Constituency: Henan

Personal details
- Born: 2 March 1911 Tiemen, China
- Died: 10 January 1993 (aged 81)

Zhang Guangren (Chinese: 張廣仁, 2 March 1911 – 10 January 1993) was a Chinese politician. She was one of the first group of women elected to the Legislative Yuan in 1948.

== Biography ==
Zhang was born in Tiemen in Xin'an County, Henan Province to Deng Shizhu and Zhang Fang, a military leader. After earning a BA at Fudan University in Shanghai, she became headteacher of the Henan Private Songyue Middle School and head of Kaifeng Women's Vocational School. She also served as a director of the Henan branch of the Chinese Women's Culture and Education Association and was a member of the Chinese branch of the Pan Pacific and Southeast Asian Women's Association. In the 1948 parliamentary elections, Zhang was elected to the Legislative Yuan from Henan Province. She relocated to Taiwan during the Chinese Civil War and died in 1993.
