= Huang Jiewen =

Chinese politician

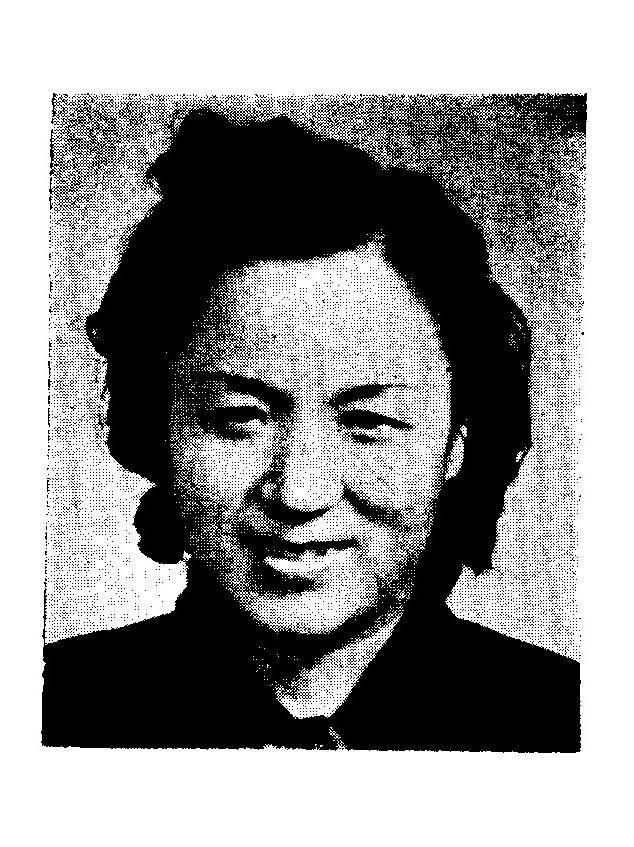

Member of the Legislative Yuan
- In office 1948–1963
- Constituency: Nenjiang

Personal details
- Born: 9 January 1913
- Died: 31 July 1963 (aged 50)

Huang Jiewen (Chinese: 黃節文, 9 January 1913 – 31 July 1963) was a Chinese politician. She was among the first group of women elected to the Legislative Yuan in 1948.

== Biography ==
Originally from Harbin, Huang graduated from the National Normal University and subsequently worked as a researcher at Tokyo Imperial University in Japan. She established the Huitong vocational school and became its principal. She also served as president of the China Children's Welfare Society.

A member of the Kuomintang, she was a delegate to the Constituent National Assembly that drew up the constitution of the Republic of China. She was subsequently a candidate in Nenjiang Province in the 1948 elections to the Legislative Yuan, in which she was elected to parliament. During the Chinese Civil War she relocated to Taiwan. She died in 1963.
