= List of the first female members of parliament by country =

This is a list of the first female members of parliament in each country and territory. Princess Isabel of Brazil could have become the first female parliamentarian in 1871, as the Brazilian constitution reserved a seat in the Senate for the heir presumptive to the throne once they reached 25 years of age. However, she did not take the seat she was entitled to. Instead, the first female parliamentarians came from the Grand Duchy of Finland, where 19 women were elected to the Eduskunta in 1907. The first female parliamentarian in a fully-independent country was Anna Rogstad of Norway, who took her seat in the Storting as a substitute in 1911, while the first woman directly elected to parliament in an independent country was Jeannette Rankin of the United States, who was elected to the House of Representatives in 1916, taking office the following year.

In some cases – such as Grace Schneiders-Howard of Suriname – women were elected before they had the right to vote, having been granted the right to stand as candidates but not active suffrage. In many cases, the first female parliamentarians were appointed rather than elected members.

The Vatican City was the last country in the world to have a female parliamentarian, with Raffaella Petrini appointed as the president of the Commission and Governorate of Vatican City in 2025.

== List of the first female members of parliament by country ==
Members are listed by when they took office. The list excludes members of provisional, non-elected legislatures constituted during or following conflicts.

Country	Year	Member	Notes
Afghanistan	1965	Roqia Abubakr; Khadija Ahrari; Masuma Esmati-Wardak; Aziza Gardizi; Anahita Ratebzad; Homeira Seljuqi	
Albania	1945	Naxhije Dume; Liri Gega; Ollga Plumbi	
Algeria	1945	Alice Sportisse Gomez-Nadal	
American Samoa	1953	Zilpher Jennings; Mabel Reid	
Andorra	1984	Mercè Bonell	
Angola	1980	19 women	
Anguilla	1972	Idalia Gumbs	Gumbs was an appointed member of the House of Assembly. She and Albena Lake-Hodge became the first elected members in 1976
Antigua and Barbuda	1958	Bertha Higgins	Higgins was an appointed member of the West Indies Federal Senate. Jacqui Quinn-Leandro was the first woman elected to the House of Representatives in 2004
Argentina	1952	Judith Elida Acuña; Generosa Aguilar; Magdalena Álvarez de Seminario; Celia Argumedo; Josefa Biondi; Josefa Brigada; María Rosa Calviño de Gómez; Hilda Nélida Castañeira; María Elena Casuccio; María Caviglia; Angélica Esperanza Dacunda; Elena Di Girolamo; Paulina Escardo; Juana Alicia Espejo; Esther Fadul; Elena Aída Fernicola; Francisca Ana Flores; Matilde Gaeta; Juanita Larrauri; Ana Carmen Macri; Dominga Ortiz; Delia Parodi; Hilda Leonor Pineda de Molins; Mafalda Piovano; Zulema Noemí Pracánico; Elvira Rodríguez Leonardi; Celina Rodríguez; Seferina Rodríguez; Carmen Salaber; María Urbelina Tejada; Isabel Torterola; Otilia Villa Maciel	
Armenia	1919	Perchuhi Partizpanyan-Barseghyan; Varvara Sahakyan; Katarine Zalyan-Manukyan	
Aruba	1963	Maria Irausquin-Wajcberg	
Australia	1943	Enid Lyons; Dorothy Tangney	
Austria	1919	Anna Boschek; Hildegard Burjan; Emmy Freundlich; Adelheid Popp; Gabriele Proft; Therese Schlesinger; Amalie Seidel; Maria Tusch	
Bahamas	1967	Doris Sands Johnson	Johnson was an appointed member of the Senate. Janet Bostwick was the first woman elected to the House of Assembly in 1982
Bahrain	2000	Mariam Al Jalahma; Bahia Al Jishi; Alees Samaan; Mona Al-Zayani	The four were appointed members. Lateefa Al Gaood became the first elected member of the Consultative Council in 2006
Bangladesh	1947	Shaista Suhrawardy Ikramullah	Ikramullah was indirectly elected to the Constituent Assembly of India, subsequently representing East Bengal in the Constituent Assembly of Pakistan.
Barbados	1949	Muriel Hanschell	Hanschell was an appointed member of the Legislative Council. Edna Ermyntrude Bourne became the woman elected to the House of Assembly in 1951
Belgium	1921	Marie Janson	Janson was an indirectly-elected member of the Senate. Lucie Dejardin was the first directly-elected member of the Chamber of Representatives in 1929
Belize	1961	Gwendolyn Lizarraga	
Benin	1979	28 women	
Bermuda	1948	Hilda Aitken; Edna Watson	
Bhutan	1979	Hiranyamayee Lama	
Bolivia	1956	Emma Gutiérrez	
Bosnia and Herzegovina	1945		
Botswana	1974	Gaositwe K. T. Chiepe; Kebatshabile Disele	Chiepe became the first female directly-elected member in a 1977 by-election
Brazil	1933	Carlota Pereira de Queirós	
British Virgin Islands	1965	Emogene Creque	Creque was an appointed member of the Legislative Council. Eileene L. Parsons and Ethlyn Smith became the first two women elected in 1995
Brunei	2011	Zasia binti Sirin; Salbiah Sulaiman	Sirin and Sulaiman were both appointed; Brunei has not held parliamentary elections since 1965.
Bulgaria	1945	Stoyanka Ancheva; Ekaterina Avramova; Tsola Dragoycheva; Stanka Ivanova; Tsvetana Keranova; Elena Ketskarova; Mara Kinkel; Venera Klincharova; Vyara Makedonska; Stefana Markova; Ekaterina Nikolova; Rada Todorova; Mata Tyurkedzhieva; Maria Toteva; Vera Zlatareva	
Burkina Faso	1959	Célestine Ouezzin Coulibaly	
Burundi	1982	Colette Samoya Kirura; Four others	
Cambodia	1958	Tong Siv Eng	
Cameroon	1955	Dorcas Idowu	Idowu was an appointed member of the Southern Cameroons House of Assembly. Julienne Keutcha was the first elected member of the National Assembly in 1960
Canada	1921	Agnes Macphail	
Cape Verde	1975	Isaura Gomes	
Cayman Islands	1961	Annie Huldah Bodden	Bodden was an appointed member of the Legislative Assembly. Mary Evelyn Wood became the first elected member in 1962
Central African Republic	1964	Marthe Matongo	
Chad	1962	Bourkou Louise Kabo	
Chile	1951	Inés Enríquez Frödden	
China	1928	Soong Mei-ling; Tao Hsuan; Tcheng Yu-hsiu	The Legislative Yuan was fully appointed until 1948, when 83 women became the first elected female members: Bai Lianzhen, Amina Bughra, Chang Ping-chiang, Chang Wei-chen, Chao Mao-hua, Chen Jianchen, Chen Jiujing, Chen Mingxian, Chen Yi Yun, Cheng Xiaofu, Cheng Xiu, Cheng Yizhi, Chou Hui-ying, Chou Min, Cui Puzhen, Cui Renqiu, Deng Jixing, Ding Chengfang, Fang Jida, Fei Hsia, Fu Ching-yen, Fu Yan, Hsieh Er, Hsing Shu-yen, Hu Manqi, Huang Jiewen, Huang Peilan, Huang Zhiquan, Huang Chen-hua, Ji Qingyi, Lee Hsiu-fen, Li Hui-min, Li Man-kuei, Li Tianlin, Li Xiangheng, Lin Shen, Ling Yingzhen, Liu Heng-ching, Liu Muzhen, Liu Puren, Liu Woying, Liu Yuzhong, Lou Yiwen, Lu Yun-chang, Luo Heng, Ma Runmin, Ma Shucheng, Mao Tan-yun, Ni Yujie, Pao Yi-min, Pi Yi-shu, Qian Ying, Qiao Jiafu, Reshide Khanum, Shih Min-chi, Sun Chi-hsu, Suo Zhaoshiya, Tan Tiwu, Tang Gouzhen, Tcheng Yu-hsiu, Tung Tao-yun, Wang Ai-fen, Wang Chang-hui, Wang Chunbi, Wang Der-zheng, Wang Hsiao-hua, Wang Hsiao-ying, Wang Lubing, Wang Tung-chen, Wei Pei-lan, Wong Tsun-yin, Wu Chi-mei, Wu Jingbin, Wu Lin, Wu Yunfang, Xia Jingru, Xiang Runkun, Yang Pao-lin, Yang Chongrui, Yeh Hsieh-chin, Yu Ruzhou, Zhang Guangren and Zhuang Jing. He Meizhi and Nie Yanghua had also been elected, but their election was overturned
Colombia	1958	Esmeralda Arboleda Cadavid; Anacarsis Cardona de Salonia; María Paulina Nieto de Caro	
Comoros	1993	Sittou Raghadat Mohamed	
Congo	1963	Mambou Aimée Gnali; Micheline Golengo; Pierrette Kombo	
Cook Islands	1947	Tararo Jane Ariki	Tararo was an indirectly-elected member of the Legislative Council; the first directly-elected women were Poko Ingram and Teupoko'ina Utanga Morgan in 1961
Costa Rica	1953	Ana Rosa Chacón; María Teresa Obregón Zamora; Estela Quesada	
Croatia	1945		
Cuba	1936	Rosa Anders Causse; María Caro Más; María Gómez Carbonell; María Antonia Quintana Herrero; Balbina Remedios; Herminia Rodríguez Fernández; Consuelo Vázquez Bello	
Curaçao	1949	Angela Altagracia de Lannoy-Willems	
Cyprus	1960	Kadriye Hulusi Hacıbulgur; Constantia Varda	Hacıbulgur and Varda were elected to the Communal Chambers, legislative bodies for the Greek and Turkish communities that sat alongside the House of Representatives. Ayla Halit Kazım became the first female member of the House of Representatives in 1963.
Czech Republic	1920	Fanni Blatny; Anna Chlebounová; Maria Deutsch; Božena Ecksteinová; Emma Maria Herzig; Betty Karpíšková; Irene Kirpal; Luisa Landová-Štychová; Anna Malá; Ludmila Pechmanová-Klosová; Anna Perthen; Eliška Purkyňová; Augusta Rozsypalová; Františka Skaunicová; Fráňa Zemínová	Božena Viková-Kunětická had been elected to the Bohemian Diet in 1912, but was not allowed to take her seat
DR Congo	1970	12 women	
Denmark	1918	Karen Ankersted; Nina Bang; Marie Christensen; Inger Gautier Schmit; Marie Hjelmer; Olga Knudsen; Helga Larsen; Elna Munch; Mathilde Malling Hauschultz	Ankersted, Larsen, Munch and Malling Hauschultz were elected to the Folketing on 22 April 1918, while Christensen, Bang, Hjelmer, Knudsen and Gautier Schmidt were elected to the Landsting on 11 May 1918. Both houses of parliament had their first session on 28 May 1918.
Djibouti	2003	Hawa Ahmed Youssouf; Ismahan Abdi Douksieh; Hasna Hassan Ali; Mariam Ibrahim Farah; Kadidja Mohamed Ali; Hasna Mohamed Dato; Aïcha Mohamed Robleh	
Dominica	1940	Elma Napier	
Dominican Republic	1942	Milady Félix de L'Official; Isabel Mayer; Josefa Sánchez de González	
Ecuador	1945	Nela Martínez	
Egypt	1957	Rawya Ateya; Amina Shukri	
El Salvador	1956	Rosa Amelia Guzmán; Inés Inocente González; Blanca Ávalos de Méndez; María Isabel Rodríguez	
Equatorial Guinea	1968	Cristina Makoli; Lorenza Matute	
Estonia	1917	Anna Leetsmann	
Eswatini	1967	Mary Mdziniso	Mdziniso was an appointed member of the Senate. Lomasontfo Dludlu was the first elected member of the House of Assembly in 1993
Ethiopia	1957	Senedu Gebru	
Falkland Islands	1950	Madge Biggs	Biggs was an appointed member of the Legislative Council. Marjorie Vinson became the first elected member in 1964
Faroe Islands	1964	Malla Samuelsen	
Fiji	1966	Loloma Livingston; Irene Jai Narayan; Losalini Raravuya Dovi	
Finland	1907	Ida Aalle-Teljo; Eveliina Ala-Kulju; Hedvig Gebhard; Aleksandra Gripenberg; Lucina Hagman; Anni Huotari; Hilda Käkikoski; Mimmi Kanervo; Liisi Kivioja; Sandra Lehtinen; Dagmar Neovius; Alli Nissinen; Maria Paaso-Laine; Hilja Pärssinen; Hilma Räsänen; Maria Raunio; Miina Sillanpää; Jenny Upari; Iida Vemmelpuu	
France	1945	Denise Bastide; Madeleine Braun; Germaine Degrond; Marie-Madeleine Dienesch; Eugénie Éboué-Tell; Germaine François; Mathilde Gabriel-Péri; Émilienne Galicier; Denise Ginollin; Lucie Guérin; Rose Guérin; Solange Lamblin; Irène Laure; Marie-Hélène Lefaucheux; Francine Lefebvre; Rachel Lempereur; Madeleine Léo-Lagrange; Jeanne Léveillé; Mathilde Méty; Raymonde Tillon; Marie Oyon; Germaine Peyroles; Germaine Poinso-Chapuis; Renée Prévert; Gilberte Roca; Simone Rollin; Marcelle Rumeau; Hélène Solomon-Langevin; Alice Sportisse Gomez-Nadal; Hélène de Suzannet; Marie Texier-Lahoulle; Marie-Claude Vaillant-Couturier; Jeannette Vermeersch	
French Polynesia	1961	Céline Oopa	
Gabon	1961	Virginie Ambougou; Antoinette Tsono	
Gambia	1968	Lucretia St. Clair Joof	St. Clair Joof was an appointed member of the House of Representatives. Nyimasata Sanneh-Bojang became the first elected member in 1982
Georgia	1919	Liza Nakashidze-Bolkvadze; Minadora Orjonikidze; Kristine Sharashidze; Anna Sologashvili; Eleonora Ter-Parsegova-Makhviladze	
Germany	1919	Lore Agnes; Marie Baum; Gertrud Bäumer; Margarete Behm; Anna Blos; Clara Bohm-Schuch; Minna Bollmann; Elisabeth Brönner; Hedwig Dransfeld; Wilhelmine Eichler; Elise Ekke; Anna von Gierke; Frieda Hauke; Else Höfs; Anna Hübler; Marie Juchacz; Wilhelmine Kähler; Katharina Kloss; Frida Lührs; Ernestine Lutze; Clara Mende; Agnes Neuhaus; Antonie Pfülf; Johanna Reitze; Elfriede Ryneck; Elisabeth Röhl; Minna Schilling; Käthe Schirmacher; Maria Schmitz; Louise Schroeder; Anna Simon; Johanna Tesch; Christine Teusch; Helene Weber; Marie Zettler; Luise Zietz	
Ghana	1954	Mabel Dove Danquah	Mabel Dove was also the first female MP in Africa
Gibraltar	1959	Dorothy Ellicott	
Greece	1953	Eleni Skoura	
Grenada	1952	Eva Sylvester	
Guam	1946	Rosa Aguigui Reyes	
Guatemala	1956	Rosa Castañeda de Mora	
Greenland	1959	Elisabeth Johansen	
Guinea	1963	14 women	
Guinea Bissau	1972	Carmen Pereira; Nine others	
Guernsey	1924	Marie Randall	
Guyana	1953	Jessie Burnham; Janet Jagan; Jane Phillips-Gay	
Haiti	1961	Madame Max Adolphe; Aviole Paul-Blanc	
Honduras	1957	Herlinda Blanco de Bonilla; Carmen Griffin de Lefreve; Carmen Meléndez de Cálix	
Hong Kong	1965	Ellen Li	Li was an appointed member of the Legislative Council. Emily Lau became the first directly-elected female member in 1991
Hungary	1920	Margit Slachta	
Iceland	1922	Ingibjörg H. Bjarnason	
India	1938	Radhabai Subbarayan	
Indonesia	1935	Cornelia Razoux Schultz-Metzer	Razoux Schultz-Metzer was an appointed member of the Volksraad. 17 women were elected to the People's Representative Council in 1955, including Sundari Abdul Rachman, Salawati Daud, Marijamah Djunaedi, Hadinijah Hadi Ngabdulhadi, Suzanna Hamdani, Sunarjo Mangunpuspito, Moedikdio, Djunah Pardzaman, Soepeni Poedjoboentoro, Umi Sardjono, Soemari, Sutijah Suryahadi, Lastari Sutrasno, Rahmah el Yunusiyah
Iran	1963	Mehrangiz Dowlatshahi; Nayereh Ebtehaj-Samii; Showkat Malek Jahanbani; Mehrangiz Manouchehrian; Shams ol-Moluk Mosahab; Nezhat Nafisi; Farrokhroo Parsa; Hajar Tarbiat	
Iraq	1980	16 women	
Republic of Ireland	1919	Constance Markievicz	Markievicz had been elected to the British House of Commons, but did not take her seat. Instead she attended the first session of the Dáil Éireann, the breakaway Irish parliament, in January 1919.
Isle of Man	1933	Marion Shimmin	
Israel	1949	Rachel Cohen-Kagan; Hasya Drori; Beba Idelson; Fayge Ilanit; Hannah Lamdan; Ada Maimon; Golda Meir; Dvora Netzer; Shoshana Persitz; Esther Raziel-Naor; Yehudit Simhonit	
Italy	1946	Adele Bei; Bianca Bianchi; Laura Bianchini; Filomena Delli Castelli; Elisabetta Conci; Maria Federici; Nadia Gallico Spano; Angela Gotelli; Angela Maria Guidi Cingolani; Nilde Iotti; Maria Maddalena Rossi; Teresa Mattei; Lina Merlin; Angiola Minella; Rita Montagnana; Maria Nicotra; Teresa Noce; Ottavia Penna Buscemi; Elettra Pollastrini; Vittoria Titomanlio; Maria De Unterrichter Jervolino	
Ivory Coast	1965	Hortense Aka-Anghui; Gladys Anoma; Jeanne Gervais	
Jamaica	1944	Iris Collins	
Japan	1946	Hatsu Ando; Michiko Fujiwara; Hanako Honda; Hatsu Imai; Toshiko Karasawa; Shidzue Katō; Chiyo Kimura; Tsuruyo Kondo; Mitsu Kōro; Haru Koshihara; Toshiko Matsuo; Kiyoko Miki; Hideko Mogami; Yone Moriyama; Kiyo Murashima; Tama Nakayama; Ito Niizuma; Misu Nomura; Kimi Ohashi; Yoshie Ōishi; Tei Saito; Chiyo Sakakibara; Hisa Sawada; Tenkoko Sonoda; En Sugawara; Keiko Sugita; Kiyo Takeda; Utako Takeuchi; Shigeyo Takeuchi; Tatsu Tanaka; Satoko Togano; Fusa Tomita; Haru Wazaki; Shizue Yamaguchi; Harue Yamashita; Tsuko Yamashita; Hisa Yoneyama; Fumiko Yoneyama; Sei Yoshida	
Jersey	1948	Ivy Forster	
Jordan	1989	Leila A. Sharaf	Sharaf was an appointed member of the Senate. Toujan al-Faisal became the first elected member of the House of Representatives in 1993
Kenya	1938	Sidney Farrar	
Kiribati	1971	Tekarei Russell	
Kuwait	2009	Aseel al-Awadhi; Rola Dashti; Salwa al-Jassar; Massouma al-Mubarak	
Laos	1958	Khampheng Boupha	
Latvia	1920	Aspazija; Zelma Cēsniece-Freidenfelde; Klāra Kalniņa; Apolonija Laurinoviča; Valērija Seile; Berta Vesmane	The six women elected in 1920 were members of the Constitutional Assembly of Latvia, which drafted the first constitution of Latvia. Berta Pīpiņa, elected in 1931, became the first woman elected to the Saeima
Lebanon	1963	Myrna Bustani	
Lesotho	1965	Ellen 'Maposholi Molapo	Molapo was an appointed member of the Senate. The first women elected to Parliament were 'Mamoshebi Kabi, Mats'eliso Moshabesha and Khauhelo Deborah Raditapole in 1993
Liberia	1960	Ellen Mills Scarbrough	
Liechtenstein	1986	Emma Eigenmann	
Lithuania	1920	Magdalena Galdikienė; Ona Muraškaitė-Račiukaitienė; Gabrielė Petkevičaitė-Bitė; Emilija Spudaitė-Gvildienė; Salomėja Stakauskaitė	
Luxembourg	1919	Marguerite Thomas-Clement	
Madagascar	1964	Elise Rasoamampionona	
Malawi	1964	Rose Chibambo	
Malaysia	1955	Halimahton Abdul Majid	
Maldives	1953	Fatima Ibrahim Didi	Didi was an appointed member of the Senate. Moomina Haleem became the first elected member of the People's Majlis in 1975.
Mali	1959	Aoua Kéita	
Malta	1947	Agatha Barbara	
Marshall Islands	1974	Carmen Bigler	
Mauritania	1975	2 women	
Mauritius	1948	Emilienne Rochecouste; Denise De Chazal	
Mexico	1954	Aurora Jiménez de Palacios	Elvia Carrillo Puerto was elected to Congress in 1924 but was not allowed to take her seat
Micronesia	2021	Perpetua Sappa Konman	
Monaco	1963	Roxane Noat-Notari	
Montserrat	1961	Margaret Rose Kelsick	
Morocco	1993	Latifa Bennani-Smires; Badia Skalli	
Mozambique	1977	Alcinda Abreu; Maria Arruvaia; Monica Chitupila; Carlota Chiwanga; Cecilia Chongo; Celeste Cossa; Justina Gaspar; Helena da Gloria; Melita Guambe; Maria Laice; Rosinha Lisboa; Graça Machel; Celeste Manhica; Isabel Martins; Salomé Moiane; Felipa Muniveda; Esperança Muthemba; Teresa Nhalingue; Marina Pachinuapa; Felizarda Paulino; Maria Rafael; Ana Sansão; Leopoldina dos Santos; Cristina Tembe; Teresa Tembo; Maria Veloso	
Myanmar	1932	Hnin Mya	
Nauru	1986	Ruby Thoma	
Nepal	1959	Dwarika Devi Thakurani; Kamal Rana	Four women had been members to the fully-appointed Advisory Assembly in 1952.
Netherlands	1918	Suze Groeneweg	
New Caledonia	1977	Edwige Antier; Marie-Paule Serve	
New Zealand	1933	Elizabeth McCombs	
Nicaragua	1957	Olga Núñez Abaunza	
Niger	1989	Roukayatou Abdou Issaka; Bibata Adamou Dakaou; Souna Hadizatou Diallo; Aïssata Karidjo Mounkaïla; Marie Lebihan	
Nigeria	1960	Wuraola Esan	Esan was an appointed member of the Senate. Esther Soyannwo was elected to the House of Representatives in 1964 but was forced to give up her seat before she sat in Parliament due to the controversy her election caused. Abiola Babatope, Justina Eze and Veronica Nnaji became the first elected members in 1979.
Niue	1975	Lapati Paka; Patricia Rex	
North Korea	1948	69 women	
North Macedonia	1945		
Northern Mariana Islands	1977	Felicidad Ogumoro	
Norway	1911	Anna Rogstad	Rogstad was a substitute member. Karen Platou became the first woman elected to the Storting in 1921
Oman	1994	Shakour bint Mohammed al-Ghamari; Taiba al-Mawali	Al-Ghamari and al-Mawali were indirectly elected to the Consultative Assembly. Rahila Al Riyami and Lujaina Mohsin Darwish were the first women directly elected in 2000
Pakistan	1947	Shaista Suhrawardy Ikramullah; Jahanara Shahnawaz	Ikramullah and Shahnawaz were indirectly elected to the Constituent Assembly. Although Nasim Wali Khan was the first woman directly elected to the National Assembly in 1977, she did not take her seat. Abida Hussain was the first directly elected woman to take her seat in 1985
Palau	1975	Akiko Sugiyama	
Palestine	1996	Hanan Ashrawi; Dalal Salameh; Jamila Saidam; Rawya Shawa; Intissar al-Wazir	
Panama	1945	Esther Neira de Calvo; Gumercinda Páez	
Papua New Guinea	1951	Doris Booth	Booth was an appointed member of the Legislative Council. Josephine Abaijah became the first woman elected to the House of Assembly in 1972.
Paraguay	1963	Dolores de Miño; Bienvenida de Sánchez	
Peru	1956	Manuela Billinghurst; Alicia Blanco Montesinos; Lola Blanco Montesinos; María Colina Lozano; Matilde Pérez Palacio; Carlota Ramos de Santolaya; Irene Silva de Santolalla; María Eleonora Silva Silva; Juana Ubilluz de Palacios	
Pitcairn Islands	1974	Thelma Brown; Carol Warren	
Philippines	1941	Elisa Ochoa	
Poland	1919	Gabriela Balicka; Jadwiga Dziubińska; Irena Kosmowska; Maria Moczydłowska; Zofia Moraczewska	Three more women – Anna Piasecka, Zofia Sokolnicka and Franciszka Wilczkowiakowa – were elected the following year in constituencies where elections had been delayed.
Portugal	1934	Domitila de Carvalho; Maria Guardiola; Maria Cândida Parreira	
Puerto Rico	1932	María Luisa Arcelay	
Qatar	2017	Hessa Sultan al-Jaber; Aisha Yousef al-Mannai; Reem al-Mansoori; Hind Abdul Rahman al-Muftah	All four were appointed to the Consultative Assembly. No women were elected in 2021, the first general election.
Romania	1946	Florica Bagdasar; Ana Bărbulescu; Constanța Crăciun; Maria Ilie Lazăr; Elena Livezeanu; Mihaela Manase; Maria Marian; Mariana Negură; Ana Pauker; Eugenia Rădăceanu; Maria Rosetti; Janeta Safir; Maria Sevastru; Alexandra Sidorovici; Elena Stoia; Olimpia Ţenescu; Elena Teodorescu; Maria Tonciulescu	
Russia	1917	Yevgenia Bosch; Catherine Breshkovsky; Vera Figner; Alexandra Kollontai; Olga Matveevskaya; Maria Perveeva; Elena Rozmirovich; Anastasia Sletova-Chernova; Maria Spiridonova; Varvara Yakovleva	
Rwanda	1965	Angèle Mukakayange	
Saint Kitts and Nevis	1984	Constance V. Mitcham	
Saint Lucia	1951	Marie Grace Augustin	Augustin was an appointed member of the Legislative Council. Heraldine Rock was the first woman elected to the House of Assembly in 1974
Saint Vincent and the Grenadines	1957	Ivy Joshua	
Samoa	1970	Faimaala Filipo	
San Marino	1974	Clara Boscaglia; Anna Maria Casali; Fausta Morganti	Marina Busignani Reffi was also elected, but gave up her seat to allow her husband to enter parliament.
São Tomé and Príncipe	1975	Alda Bandeira; Alda Neves da Graça do Espírito Santo; Julieta da Graça do Espírito Santo; Maria Aurora Lopes; Lurdes de Maria Lima Pires dos Santos; Fernanda Pontífice	
Saudi Arabia	2013	30 women	The Consultative Assembly is a fully appointed body and no elections have ever been held
Senegal	1963	Caroline Faye Diop	
Serbia	1945		
Seychelles	1948	Marie-Cécile Collet	Collet was an appointed member. Hilda Stevenson-Delhomme became the first elected member in 1951.
Sierra Leone	1957	Ella Koblo Gulama	
Singapore	1951	Elizabeth Choy; Vilasini Menon	
Slovakia	1920	Anna Sychravová	
Slovenia	1945		
Solomon Islands	1965	Lilly Ogatina Poznanski	Poznanski was indirectly elected. Hilda Kari was the first woman directly elected to the National Parliament in 1989.
Somalia	1979	18 women	
South Africa	1933	Leila Reitz	
South Korea	1946	Hwang Shin-duk; Park Hyun-sook; Park Seung-ho; Shin Eui-kyung	The four were appointed members. Louise Yim became the first woman elected to parliament in 1949
Spain	1931	Clara Campoamor Margarita Nelken; Victoria Kent	Thirteen women had previously been members of the fully-appointed National Assembly
Sri Lanka	1931	Adeline Molamure	
Sudan	1965	Fatima Ahmed Ibrahim	
Suriname	1938	Grace Schneiders-Howard	
Sweden	1921	Kerstin Hesselgren; Agda Östlund; Elisabeth Tamm; Nelly Thüring; Bertha Wellin	
Switzerland	1971	Elisabeth Blunschy; Tilo Frey; Hedi Lang; Lise Girardin; Josi Meier; Gabrielle Nanchen; Martha Ribi; Hanna Sahlfeld-Singer; Liselotte Spreng; Hanny Thalmann; Lilian Uchtenhagen; Nelly Wicky	
Syria	1960	Widad Haroun; Jihan al-Mosli	Haroun and al-Mosli were appointed members of the National Assembly of the United Arab Republic. Hana Hamwi, Boshra Kanafani, Munuar Mackluta, Salma Najeeb and Hajar Sadek became the first women elected to parliament in 1973.
Taiwan	1948	Hsieh Er; Lin Shen	
Tanzania	1955	Sheroo Keeka; Elifuraha Marealle; K.F. Walker	The three were appointed. Lady Marion Chesham and Sophia Mustafa became the first elected members in 1958.
Thailand	1949	Orapin Chaiyakan	
Togo	1961	Joséphine Hundt	
Tonga	1975	Mele Siuʻilikutapu	
Trinidad and Tobago	1946	Audrey Jeffers	Jeffers was an appointed member of the Legislative Council. Isabel Ursula Teshea became the first elected member of the House of Representatives in 1961
Tunisia	1959	Radhia Haddad	
Turkey	1935	Bahire Bediş Morova Aydilek; Mihri Bektaş; Hatı Çırpan; Nakiye Elgün; Sabiha Gökçül Erbay; Mebrure Gönenç; Hatice Sabiha Görkey; Ferruh Güpgüp; Seniha Nafız Hızal; Ayşe Şekibe İnsel; Benal Nevzat İstar Arıman; Fatma Şakir Memik; Fatma Esma Nayman; Huriye Baha Öniz; Türkan Örs Baştuğ; Fakihe Öymen; Meliha Ulaş	
Turks and Caicos Islands	1984	Rosita Butterfield	
Tuvalu	1989	Naama Maheu Latasi	
Uganda	1954	Alice Boase; Barbara Saben	Boase and Saben were appointed members of the Legislative Council. Florence Alice Lubega and Sugra Visram were indirectly elected in 1962, while Theresa Odongo-Oduka became the first directly elected woman in 1980.
Ukraine	1917	Yevgenia Bosch; Catherine Breshkovsky	Maria-Ivanna Hrushevska, Zinayida Mirna, Vira Nechayivska, Valeriya O'Connor-Vilinska, Olimpiada Pashchenko, Sofia Rusova, Liudmyla Starytska-Cherniakhivska and Lyubov Yanovska were members of the fully-appointed Central Council of the People's Republic of Ukraine, which was established in March 1917, eight months before the elections in which Bosch and Breshkovsky were elected to the Russian Constituent Assembly from Ukrainian constituencies.
United Arab Emirates	2007	Najla Faisal Al Awadhi; Fatima Al Mazrouei; Fatma Al Marri; Amal Al Qubaisi; Aisha Al Roumi; Rawiyah Al Samahi; Alia Al Suwaidi; Nidal Al Tunaiji; Maysa Ghadeer	Amal Al Qubaisi was the only elected member; the other eight were appointed
United Kingdom	1919	Nancy Astor	Constance Markievicz had been elected to parliament in 1918, but did not take her seat.
United States of America	1917	Jeannette Rankin	Still the only Montana woman ever elected to the US Congress. Later female Members of Congress have all come from other states.
United States Virgin Islands	1955	Lucinda Sewer Millin	
Uruguay	1943	Sofía Álvarez Vignoli; Magdalena Antonelli Moreno; Julia Arévalo de Roche; Isabel Pinto de Vidal	
Vanuatu	1965	Agnes Terei	Terei was an appointed member of the Advisory Council. Tessa Fowler and Mary Gilu were the first women elected to the Representative Assembly in 1975.
Vatican City	2025	Raffaella Petrini	
Venezuela	1946	Mercedes Carvajal de Arocha; Nieves de Entrena; Mercedes Fermín; Carmen Gracián de Malpica; Inés Labrador de Lara; Analuisa Llovera; Cecilia Núñez; Amparo Monroy Power; Catalina Romero; Isaura Saavedra; Panchita Soublette Saluzzo; Luisa del Valle Silva	
Vietnam	1946	10 women	
Wallis and Futuna	1992	2 women	
Yemen	1978	6 women in South Yemen	Five women had previously been members of the all-appointed Supreme People's Council of South Yemen.
Zambia	1963	Gwendoline Konie	Konie was an appointed member of the Legislative Council; Ester Banda, Margaret Mbeba and Nakatindi Yeta Nganga were the first women elected in 1964
Zimbabwe	1920	Ethel Tawse Jollie	
