= Monica Chitupila =

Mozambican independence activist and politician

Member of the People's Assembly
- In office 1977–
- Constituency: Maputo City

Monica Chitupila was a Mozambican independence activist and politician. In 1977 she was one of the first group of women elected to the People's Assembly.

== Biography ==
Chitupila was originally from Niassa Province. She became involved in the independence struggle, starting her training in 1967 in Nachingwea and rising to become the Provincial Commander of the FRELIMO Female Detachment in Niassa. Chitupila was a FRELIMO candidate in the 1977 parliamentary elections, in which she was one of the first group of 27 women elected to the People's Assembly. An employee of Fábrica Continental de Borracha, she was re-elected in 1986 and became the longest serving member of the FRELIMO central committee.
