= Cristina Tembe =

Member of the People's Assembly
- In office 1977–
- Constituency: Maputo

Personal details
- Died: 24 June 2017

Cristina Jeremias Tembe (died 24 June 2017) was a Mozambican independence activist and politician. In 1977 she was one of the first group of women elected to the People's Assembly.

== Biography ==
During her youth, Tembe was involved with the Igreja Presbiteriana de Moçambique. A student activist, she joined FRELIMO and in 1964 was one of a group that attempted to go into exile in Tanzania to avoid the PIDE. However, she was arrested while travelling through Rhodesia and deported back to Mozambique, where she was detained by the PIDE. She rose to become a member of the party's central committee.

Following independence in 1975, she was a FRELIMO candidate in the 1977 parliamentary elections, and was one of the first group of 27 women elected to the People's Assembly. Re-elected in 1986, she also served on the Maputo secretariat of the party, and as secretary of the Maputo branch of the Organization of Mozambican Women. In 1992 she was a founder of SPI, the unofficial financial arm of FRELIMO.

She died in June 2017.
