= Maria Veloso =

Member of the People's Assembly
- In office 1977–
- Constituency: Maputo City

Maria Teresa Veloso was a Mozambican civil servant and politician. In 1977 she was one of the first group of women elected to the People's Assembly.

== Biography ==
An employee of the Ministry of Education, Veloso was a FRELIMO candidate in the 1977 parliamentary elections, in which she was one of the first group of 27 women elected to the People's Assembly. She was re-elected in 1986 from Maputo City as a representative of APIE. She later worked for the National Institute for the Development of Education.
