= Cecilia Chongo =

Mozambican politician

Member of the People's Assembly
- In office 1977–
- Constituency: Gaza

Cecilia Miranda Chongo was a Mozambican politician. In 1977 she was one of the first group of women elected to the People's Assembly.

== Biography ==
Chongo was a FRELIMO candidate in the 1977 parliamentary elections, in which she was one of the first group of 27 women elected to the People's Assembly. She was re-elected in 1986 from Gaza Province.
