= Esperança Muthemba =

Mozambican independence activist and politician

Member of the People's Assembly
- In office 1977–
- Constituency: Nampula

Esperança Abiatar Muthemba was a Mozambican independence activist and politician. In 1977 she was one of the first group of women elected to the People's Assembly.

== Biography ==
During the Mozambican War of Independence Muthemba was involved with the underground movements in Lourenço Marques. After being arrested in João Belo by the PIDE, she was exiled to Muecate in Nampula Province, where she was required to report to the administration on a daily basis. In 1967 she began working for the Credito Agricola de Nampula as a bookkeeper.

Following independence in 1975, she was a FRELIMO candidate in the 1977 parliamentary elections and was one of the first group of 27 women elected to the People's Assembly. Re-elected in 1986, she was a substitute member of the Inter-Parliamentary Union Council. She also served as the secretary of the Maputo branch of the Organization of Mozambican Women.
