= Salomé Moiane =

Mozambican politician

Deputy Minister of Foreign Affairs
- In office 1991–2004

Member of the People's Assembly
- In office 1977–2004
- Constituency: Sofala Province

Personal details
- Born: 1951; Maciene, Mozambique

Salomé Milagre Machiuassane Moiane (born 1951) is a Mozambican politician. In 1977 she was one of the first group of women elected to the People's Assembly.

== Biography ==
Moiane was born in Maciene in 1951 to parents who lived in Ngonwanine village. Her father, an assimilado, worked in Lourenço Marques for the Portuguese Geographical and Cadastral Service and Moiane was raised by her maternal grandmother until the age of six. She attended a catholic primary school in Chongoene for three years and then spent a year at school in Xipamanine before studying bookkeeping at the Escola Comercial. She also joined the Geographical and Cadastral Service in 1968 and was the first African woman to quality as a map drafting technician.

After marrying in 1971, Moiane and her husband moved to Beira. In 1974 she began working for the railway service. Following independence, she became involved with literacy campaigns. During 1976 she attended the third Organization of Mozambican Women conference. Shortly after the conference president Samora Machel appointed her as its new secretary general, a role she held until 1990. Moiane was subsequently a FRELIMO candidate in the 1977 parliamentary elections, in which she was one of the first group of 27 women elected to the People's Assembly. She was re-elected to the Assembly in 1986 from Sofala Province as a representative of MOBEIRA in Beira. In January 1991 she was appointed Deputy Minister of Foreign Affairs, a role she held until 2004. She was re-elected again in 1994 and 1999, serving in the Assembly until 2004.
