= Leopoldina dos Santos =

Mozambican politician

Member of the People's Assembly
- In office 1977–

Leopoldina dos Santos was a Mozambican politician. In 1977 she was one of the first group of women elected to the People's Assembly.

== Biography ==
Dos Santos was a FRELIMO candidate in the 1977 parliamentary elections, in which she was one of the first group of 27 women elected to the People's Assembly.
