= Qian Ying =

Qian Ying may mean:

- Qian Ying (Kuomintang politician) (Chinese: 錢英), member of the Legislative Yuan of the Republic of China 1948–
- Qian Ying (communist politician) (Chinese: 钱瑛), Minister of Supervision of the People's Republic of China 1954–1959
