= Felipa Muniveda =

Mozambican politician

Member of the People's Assembly
- In office 1977–

Felipa Muniveda was a Mozambican politician. In 1977 she was one of the first group of women elected to the People's Assembly.

Muniveda was a FRELIMO candidate in the 1977 parliamentary elections, and was elected to parliament.
