= Felizarda Paulino =

Mozambican politician

Member of the People's Assembly
- In office 1977–

Felizarda Paulino is a Mozambican politician. In 1977 she was one of the first group of women elected to the People's Assembly.

== Biography ==
Paulino was a FRELIMO candidate in the 1977 parliamentary elections, in which she was one of the first group of 27 women elected to the People's Assembly. In 2020 she was appointed to the Council of State.
