= Piovano =

Piovano is an Italian surname. Notable people with the surname include:

- Federica Piovano, Italian golfer
- Luigi Piovano, Italian cellist and conductor
- Mafalda Piovano de Castro, Argentine politician

== See also ==
- Piovani
