= Lin Shen =

Lin Shen may refer to:

- Lin Shen (actor) (born 1980), a Chinese actor
- Lin Shen (politician) (1908–1992), a Taiwanese politician
- Lin Sen (1868–1943), Chinese politician
