= Celeste Cossa =

Mozambican politician

Member of the People's Assembly
- In office 1977–
- Constituency: Gaza

Celeste Vatatono Cossa was a Mozambican politician. In 1977 she was one of the first group of women elected to the People's Assembly.

== Biography ==
Originally from Chibuto, Cossa worked in the cotton growing sector, which had been forced upon areas of the country by the Portuguese authorities. She was a FRELIMO candidate in the 1977 parliamentary elections, in which she was one of the first group of 27 women elected to the People's Assembly.
