= Dominga (given name) =

Dominga is a feminine version of the name Domingo. Notable people with the name include:

- Dominga Sotomayor Castillo
- Dominga Lucía Molina
- Dominga Ortiz
- Dominga Ortiz Orzúa
