= Fu Yan =

Fu Yan may refer to:

- Fu Yan (politician), a Chinese politician
- Fu Yan (constituency), a constituency of Yuen Long District Council in Hong Kong
