= 1959 Greenlandic Provincial Council election =

- 29 June 1959
- All 13 seats in the Provincial Council
- Turnout: 58.63%
Party	Seats	+/–
Independents	13	0
This lists parties that won seats. See the complete results below.

Provincial Council elections were held in Greenland on 29 June 1959. A total of 67 candidates contested the 13 seats, with Elisabeth Johansen, who was successful in Uummannaq, becoming the first woman elected to the Provincial Council.

== Electoral system ==
Members of the Provincial Council were elected by first-past-the-post voting in 13 single-member constituencies.

== Results ==
Party	Votes	%	Seats
Independents			13
Total			13
Valid votes	6,641	97.65	
Invalid/blank votes	160	2.35	
Total votes	6,801	100.00	
Registered voters/turnout	11,599	58.63	
Source: Danmarks Statistik

=== Elected members ===
Constituency	Elected member
Aasiaat	Hans Lynge
Ilulissat	Marius Sivertsen
Kangaatsiaq	Nikolaj Karlsen
Maniitsoq	Lars Møller
Nanortalik	Jakob Nielsen
Narsaq	Erik Egede
Nuuk	Peter K. S. Heilmann
Paamiut	Nathan Jakobsen
Qaqortoq	Erling Høegh
Qullissat	Andreas Nielsen
Sisimiut	Jørgen C. F. Olsen
Upernavik	Ole Svendsen
Uummannaq	Elisabeth Johansen
Source: Kjœr Sørensen

== Aftermath ==
In May 1961 three additional constituencies were created covering Angmagssalik, Scoresbysund and Thule, with elections to fill these seats held on 30 May. Hendrik Abelsen was elected in Angmagssalik, Peter Jensen was elected in Thule and Magtikalaat Arqe in Scoresysund.

Knud Kristiansen was unable to attend sessions in May 1963, with Rasmus Kleemann acting as a substitute.
