= Piovani =

Piovani is an Italian surname. Notable people with the surname include:

- Gianpietro Piovani (born 1968), Italian footballer and manager
- Luana Piovani (born 1976), Brazilian actress and model
- Maurizio Piovani, Italian racing cyclist
- Nicola Piovani (born 1946), Italian musician
- Pina Piovani (1897–1955), Italian stage and film actress

== See also ==
- Piovano
