= Anacarsis Cardona de Salonia =

Colombian lawyer and politician

Member of the Chamber of Representatives
- In office 1958–1960
- Constituency: Caldas

Personal details
- Born: 4 July 1929 Sevilla, Colombia
- Died: 17 November 1987 (aged 58) Bogotá, Colombia

Anacarsis Cardona de Salonia (4 July 1929 – 17 November 1987) was a Colombian lawyer, judge, and politician who made history as one of the first women to be elected to the Congress of Colombia, in 1958. As member of the Liberal Party, she represented Caldas in the Chamber of Representatives from 1958 to 1960. Her career spanned from serving as a municipal judge in Génova to becoming an active political figure in Armenia.

== Early life ==
Salonia was born in Seville, Valle del Cauca, on July 4, 1929 as the third child of Ana de Jesús Toro and Luis María Cardona, who originally came from Salento.Her father was the brother of Catarino Cardona, a prominent lawyer at the time, and her mother was a cousin of Volney Toro Arbeláez, the governor of the Quindío Department.She received her early education at the Colegio de las Hermanas Teresitas and later graduated from the Colegio de la Presentación de Manizales on November 19, 1948.

She enrolled in the Faculty of Law and Political Sciences of the Universidad Externado de Colombia. After graduating, she moved to Genova to serve as a municipal judge. She served in this position for a short time before moving to Armenia to join the movement of Horacio Ramírez Castrillón, a prominent Liberal leader. In 1961, her brother, Pitágoras, was murdered, which prompted her to relocate to Bogotá.

== Political career ==
A member of the Liberal Party, Cardona was a candidate in Caldas in the 1958 parliamentary elections and was elected to the Chamber of Representatives, becoming one of the first group of women to enter Congress. She remained a member until the 1960 elections.

== Personal life ==
She married Conrado Antonio Salonia, the Argentine lawyer and had 3 children.

== Death ==
She died on 17 November 1987.
