= María Paulina Nieto de Caro =

Colombian politician (born 1914)

Member of the Chamber of Representatives
- In office 1958–
- Constituency: Cundinamarca

Personal details
- Born: 13 June 1914 Bogotá, Colombia

María Paulina Nieto de Caro (born 13 June 1914) was a Colombian politician. She was elected to the Chamber of Representatives in 1958 as one of the first group of women to enter Congress.

== Biography ==
Nieto de Caro was born in Bogotá in 1914, the daughter of Luis Eduardo Nieto Caballero, a Liberal Party politician.

She also joined the Liberal Party and was a candidate in Cundinamarca in the 1958 parliamentary elections and was elected to the Chamber of Representatives, becoming one of the first group of women to enter Congress.
