= Cornelia Razoux Schultz-Metzer =

Dutch feminist and politician

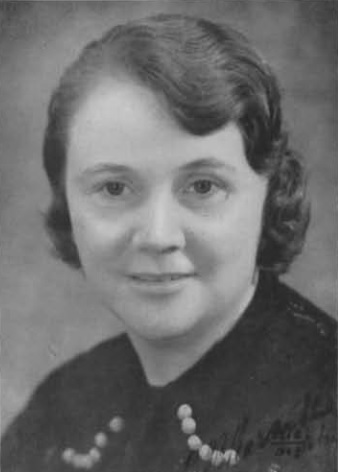

Member of the Volksraad
- In office 1935–1940

Personal details
- Born: 27 October 1898; Doesburg, Netherlands
- Died: 12 March 1992 (aged 93); The Hague, Netherlands

Cornelia Razoux Schultz-Metzer (27 October 1898 – 12 March 1992) was a Dutch feminist and politician who was active in the Dutch East Indies. She was the first female member of the colonial legislature, the Volksraad, where she attempted to introduce women's suffrage.

== Biography ==
Razoux Schultz-Metzer was born Cornelia Hendrika Metzer in Doesburg in October 1898, the daughter of Cornelia Jansen and Jacobus Metzer, an army officer and swimming pool manager. After earning a diploma at Arnhem teacher training college in 1919, she taught in Arnhem and the Hague. She married François Marie Razoux Schultz in 1922 and the couple moved to Batavia later the same year when François started an engineering job in the city. The couple had four children between 1923 and 1930.

In 1931 Razoux Schultz-Metzer helped establish the Batavian Association of Housewives and the Indo-European Alliance–Women's Organisation (IEV-VO). Like its partner organisation, the Indo Europeesch Verbond, the IEV-VO advocated for European women and children in the territory. She was also a member of the Dutch East Indies branch of the Dutch Association for Women's Interests and Equal Citizenship. Although women's suffrage had been introduced in the Netherlands in 1919, it had not been extended to its colonies and it remained a central agenda item for members of the Association. In 1933 she was awarded the Order of Orange-Nassau.

Razoux Schultz-Metzer was appointed 'commissioner of police of the second class, specially charged with women's and children's affairs' in 1934. The following year, Governor Bonifacius Cornelis de Jonge appointed her as the first female member of the Volksraad. In 1937 she introduced a motion that called for women's suffrage for all population groups in the territory. Although passive suffrage was introduced, allowing women to stand for election, active suffrage was not. She was reappointed to the Volksraad in 1939, but was on holiday in the Netherlands when the country was invaded by Nazi Germany in 1940, preventing her from returning for the duration of the war. Another woman, J. Ch. Neuyen-Hakker, was appointed to the Volksraad in her place.

She joined the board of the East Indies Dutch Red Cross in 1945 and returned to the territory in December 1946. The IEV-VO was renamed the Dutch Indies Social Women's Organisation after the war, before becoming the Dutch Social Women's Association in 1949; she remained its president until the organisation died out. In 1947 she was appointed head of the Social Personnel Department. Following François' death in 1953, she returned to teaching from 1955 to 1968.

She died in the Hague in 1992 at the age of 93.
