= Celina Rodríguez =

Argentine politician

Member of the Chamber of Deputies
- In office 1952–1955
- Constituency: Buenos Aires

Celina E. Rodríguez was an Argentine politician. She was elected to the Chamber of Deputies in 1951 as one of the first group of female parliamentarians in Argentina.

== Biography ==
In the 1951 legislative elections she was a Peronist Party candidate in Buenos Aires and was one of the 26 women elected to the Chamber of Deputies. She remained in office until 1955, when her term was cut short by the Revolución Libertadora.
