= Suo Zhaoshiya =

Chinese politician

- 索趙士雅
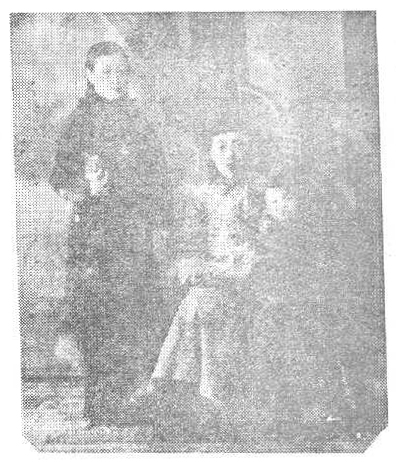
- Suo with her husband and son

Member of the Legislative Yuan
- In office 1948–
- Constituency: Sichuan Frontier Ethnic Group

Personal details
- Born: 1905; Wenjiang District, China
- Died: 18 January 1967; China
- Political party: Chinese Youth Party

Suo Zhaoshiya (Chinese: 索趙士雅; 1905 – 18 January 1967) was a Chinese politician. She was among the first group of women elected to the Legislative Yuan in 1948.

== Biography ==
Originally from Wenjiang County in Sichuan Province, Suo was educated at Chengdu Law School. Aged 22 she married Suo Guanyuan, a Tusi of Wasi Xuanwei. Due to the traditional division of labour among the Gyalrong people, she was responsible for external affairs, while her husband managed internal affairs. When her husband died in 1940, their son Suo Guoguang took over as Tusi. However, as he was only seven years old at the time, Suo performed his duties. In 1946 she became a council member of Wenchuan County Women's Federation.

In the same year Suo joined the newly formed Wenchuan County branch of the Chinese Youth Party. In the 1948 elections she was elected to the Legislative Yuan from the Sichuan Frontier Ethnic Group constituency. She remained on the mainland following the Chinese Civil War and served as vice chair of Wenchuan County Minority Democratic Consultative Committee from 1950 to 1956. Between 1956 and 1967 she served on the Standing Committee of the Political Consultative Committee of Aba Tibetan Autonomous Prefecture.

During the Cultural Revolution Suo was denounced in a struggle session. Already suffering from heart disease, her conditioned worsened when she was publicly paraded. She died in January 1967.
