= Reem al-Mansoori =

Qatari civil servant and politician

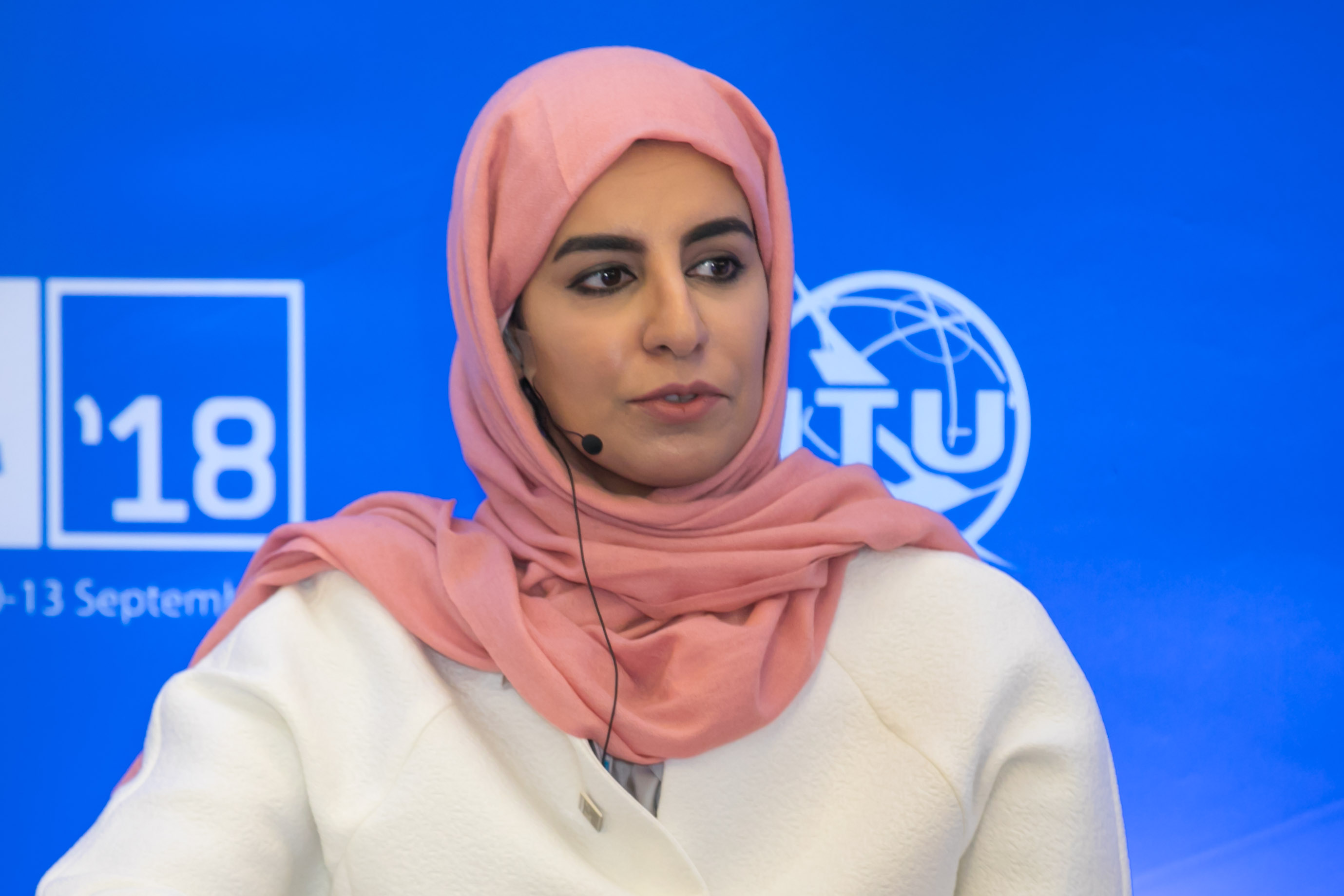

Member of the Consultative Assembly
- In office 2017–

Reem bint Mohammed al-Mansoori is a Qatari civil servant and politician. In 2017 she was one of four women appointed to the Shura Council, becoming one of the country's first female parliamentarians.

== Biography ==
After studying for a BSc in computer science at Qatar University, al-Mansoori earned an MSc in computational intelligence at the University of Plymouth in the United Kingdom and an MBA at HEC Paris. Entering the civil service in Qatar, al-Mansoori became head of the Digital Society and Digital Industry Development departments within the Ministry of Transport and Communications.

Al-Mansoori was appointed to the Shura Council in November 2017 by Emir Tamim bin Hamad Al Thani.
