= Mariam Al Jalahma =

Bahraini physician, civil servant and politician (born 1961)

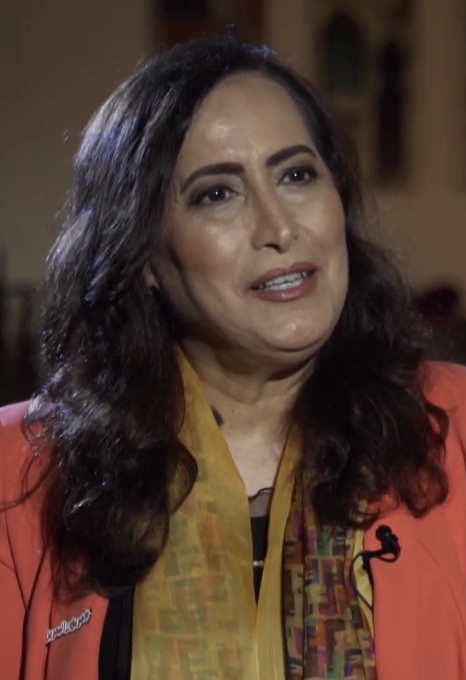

Nominated Member of the Consultative Council
- In office 2000–2002

Personal details
- Born: 1961 (age 64–65) Bahrain

Mariam Adhbi Al Jalahma (Arabic: مريم عذبي الجلاهمة, born 1961) is a Bahraini physician, civil servant and politician. In 2000 she was appointed to the Consultative Council, becoming one of its first female members.

== Biography ==
Al Jalahma was born in Bahrain in 1961 and completed her secondary education at Al Hoora Secondary School for Girls in 1977. She then studied for a bachelor of medicine and surgery at the Qasr El Eyni faculty of Cairo University, graduating in 1985. She worked in the paediatric department of the Bahrain Defence Force Hospital in 1986–87, before joining the family medicine training programme of the Ministry of Health, where she worked until 1990.

After earning a certificate of specialisation in family medicine from the American University of Beirut in 1990, Al Jalahma worked as a family medicine consultant at Muharraq from 1990 to 1993. From 1993 to 1994 she was deputy chief medical officer at the National Bank of Bahrain's health centre. In 1994 she was awarded a higher diploma in medical education from the University of Dundee School of Medicine. From 1996 she held an assistant professorship at the Faculty of Medicine of the Arabian Gulf University, and in 1999 she also began introducing health programmes on radio and television.

In 2000 Al Jalahma completed a diploma in healthcare management at the Royal College of Surgeons in Ireland. In the same year she was one of four women appointed to the Consultative Council by Emir Hamad bin Isa Al Khalifa, becoming its first female members. She remained on the Consultative Council until 2002, after which she became Coordinator of International and Public Relations at the Ministry of Health.

Al Jalahma was appointed to the executive board of the Gulf Cooperation Council Health Ministers' Council in 2007. In 2015 she was appointed chief executive of the National Health Regulatory Authority.
