= Yone Moriyama =

Japanese politician (1891–1990)

- 森山 ヨネ

Member of the House of Representatives
- In office 10 April 1946 – 31 March 1947
- Preceded by: Constituency established
- Succeeded by: Constituency abolished
- Constituency: Fukuoka 1st

Personal details
- Born: 14 January 1891 Kurume, Fukuoka, Japan
- Died: 30 October 1990 (aged 99)
- Party: Progressive
- Education: Columbia University

Yone Moriyama (Japanese: 森山ヨネ, 14 January 1891 – 30 October 1990) was a Japanese educator and politician. She was one of the first group of women elected to the House of Representatives in 1946.

== Biography ==
Moriyama was born in Kurume in 1891. She was educated at Fukuoka Girls' School and Nara Girl's Higher Normal School. She then studied at Columbia University in the United States as an overseas researcher for the Ministry of Education. After returning to Japan, she worked as a teacher at Kagoshima Prefectural Kokubu High School and Girl's Normal Schools in Mie and Fukuoka, after which she became a professor at Fukuoka Women's College. After retiring, she moved to Brazil, but returned to Japan in 1942.

Moriyama contested the 1946 general elections (the first in which women could vote) as a Japan Progressive Party candidate, and was elected to the House of Representatives. She did not run for re-election in 1947 general elections and withdrew from public life. She lived with her niece for the rest of her life and died in 1990.
