= Esther Fadul =

Argentine politician (1915–2011)

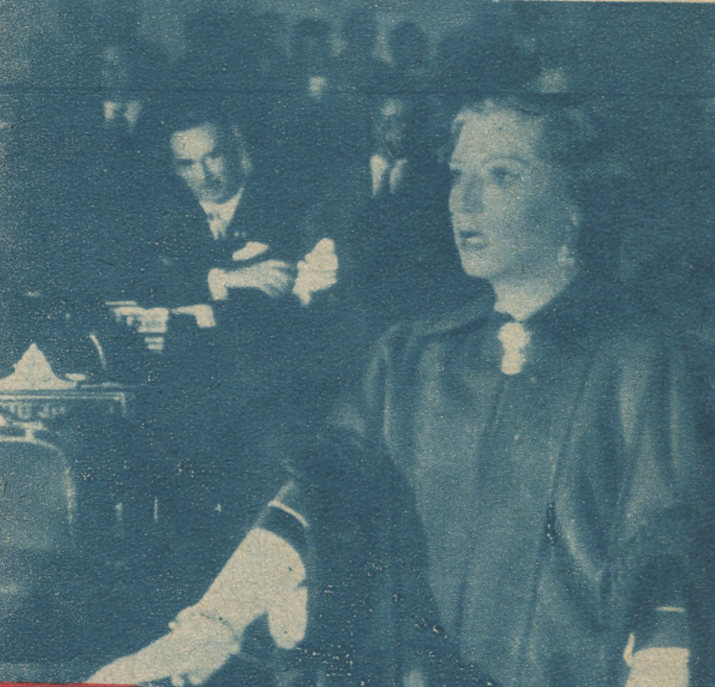

National Deputy
- In office 1973–1976
- In office 1952–1955
- Constituency: Tierra del Fuego

Personal details
- Born: 13 December 1915 Ushuaia, Argentina
- Died: 30 August 2011 (aged 95) Ushuaia, Argentina

Esther Mercedes Fadul de Sobrino (13 December 1915 – 30 August 2011) was an Argentine politician. She was elected to the Chamber of Deputies in 1951 as one of the first group of female parliamentarians in Argentina.

== Biography ==
Fadul was born in Ushuaia in December 1915, the daughter of María and Barcleit Fadul, who was of Lebanese descent. She married the writer and teacher Constantino Sobrino; the couple did not have any children.

In the 1951 legislative elections she was a Peronist Party candidate in Tierra del Fuego. She was elected to the Chamber of Deputies, becoming both the first representative of Tierra del Fuego and one of the first group of 26 women deputies. She was nicknamed "the Penguin" by the Peróns. Although she was re-elected in the 1954 elections, her term was cut short later the same year by the Revolución Libertadora. She was elected to Chamber of Deputies again in 1973. However, her term was ended early by the 1976 coup.

She died at Ushuaia Regional Hospital during an operation for a broken hip in August 2011 at the age of 95.
