= Misu Nomura =

Japanese politician (1896–1979)

- 野村 ミス

Member of the House of Representatives
- In office 10 April 1946 – 31 March 1947
- Preceded by: Constituency established
- Succeeded by: Constituency abolished
- Constituency: Niigata 2nd

Personal details
- Born: 19 August 1896 Nakauonuma, Niigata, Japan
- Died: 15 March 1979 (aged 82)
- Party: National Cooperative

Misu Nomura (Japanese: 野村ミス; 19 August 1896 – 15 March 1979) was a Japanese politician. She was one of the first group of women elected to the House of Representatives in 1946.

== Biography ==
Nomura was born in 1896 in the village of Kuramata in Nakauonuma District of Niigata Prefecture (now part of Tōkamachi). After graduating from Ueno Housekeeper High School in 1919 she worked as a primary school teacher. She married Kojiro Nomura, who worked at the tax office.

After World War II, Nomura contested the Niigata 2nd district in the 1946 general elections as an independent candidate, and was elected to the House of Representatives. She was a founding member of the National Cooperative Party (NCP) in 1947, becoming one of its vice presidents. She unsuccessfully contested the 1947 House of Councillors elections as an NCP candidate in Niigata Prefecture. She died in 1979.
