= Maria Nicotra =

Italian politician (1913–2007)

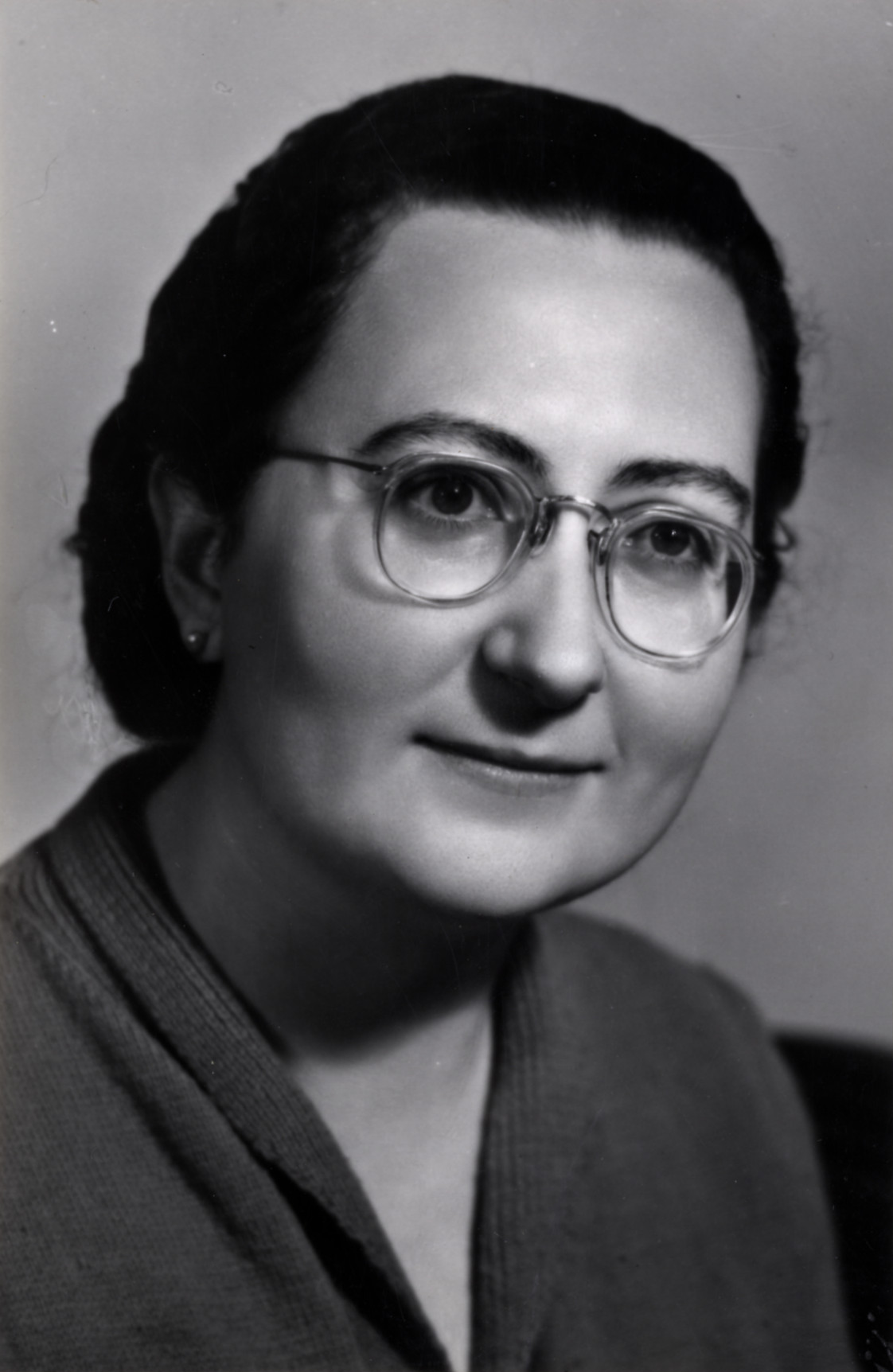
- Official portrait, 1948

Member of the Chamber of Deputies
- In office 1948–1953
- Constituency: Catania

Member of the Constituent Assembly
- In office 1946–1948
- Constituency: XXIX

Personal details
- Born: 6 July 1913 Catania, Sicily, Kingdom of Italy
- Died: 14 July 2007 (aged 94) Padua, Veneto, Italy
- Spouse: Graziano Verzotto (m. 1949)
- Occupation: Politician; sports club administrator
- Profession: Nurse

Maria Nicotra Fiorini (born Maria Nicotra; 6 July 1913 – 14 July 2007) was an Italian politician. She was elected to the Constituent Assembly in 1946 as one of the first group of women parliamentarians in Italy. She subsequently served in the Chamber of Deputies from 1948 to 1953 and was later the first female president of a professional football club in Italy.

== Biography ==
Nicotra was born in Catania in 1913 to Irene Fiorini and Sebastiano Nicotra. She became a member of the Catania branch of Azione Cattolica and during World War II served as a nurse, winning a gold medal for valour in nursing. In 1944 she joined the women's commission of the Christian Associations of Italian Workers.

Following the war, Nicotra was a Christian Democracy candidate in the June 1946 general elections, in which she was one of 21 women elected to the Constituent Assembly. Despite never speaking in the Assembly, she was elected to the Chamber of Deputies in 1948, serving until the 1953 elections. She remained involved in the women's section of the Christian Democracy and chaired the Catania autonomous public housing body between 1960 and 1965. She married Graziano Verzotto in 1949. After Verzotto moved abroad, she replaced him as president of Siracusa Calcio, the first woman in Italy to become president of a professional football club. When Verzotto returned to Italy and settled in Padua, Nicotra joined him. She died in the city in 2007.
