= Tei Saito =

Japanese politician (1907–1991)

- 斎藤 てい

Member of the House of Representatives
- In office 10 April 1946 – 31 March 1947
- Preceded by: Constituency established
- Succeeded by: Multi-member district
- Constituency: Wakayama at-large

Personal details
- Born: 8 February 1907 Wakayama Prefecture, Japan
- Died: 23 January 1991 (aged 83)
- Party: Democratic
- Other party: Progressive (1946–1947)

Tei Saito (Japanese: 斎藤てい; 8 February 1907 – 23 January 1991) was a Japanese politician. She was one of the first group of women elected to the House of Representatives in 1946.

== Biography ==
Saito was born in Wakayama Prefecture in 1907 and was educated at Uchimi Girls' Vocational School. She married Motohide Saito, a lawyer. During World War II she was an officer in the National Women's Defence Association in the Takinogawa area of Tokyo.

After the war, Saito became a member of the Japan Progressive Party and served as deputy director of its women's section. She was a candidate for the party in Wakayama in the 1946 general elections (the first in which women could vote), and was elected to the House of Representatives. After the Progressive Party merged into the Democratic Party, she was an unsuccessful Democratic Party candidate in Wakayama 1st district in the 1947 elections. She later moved to Tokyo with her husband and died in 1991.
