= Lin Shen (politician) =

Taiwanese politician

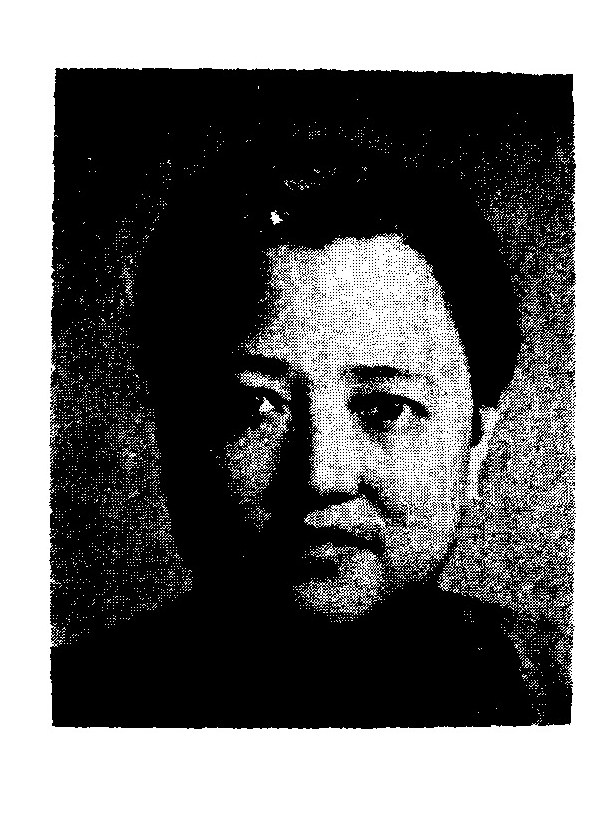

Member of the Legislative Yuan
- In office 1948–1991
- Constituency: Taiwan

Personal details
- Born: October 1908 Taihoku Prefecture, Taiwan, Japan
- Died: 28 October 1992 (aged 83–84)

Lin Shen (Chinese: 林慎 October 1908 – 28 October 1992), also known as Mu En, was a Taiwanese politician. She was one of the first group of women elected to the Legislative Yuan in 1948.

== Biography ==
Born in Taipei County, Lin attended Hwa Nan College in Fuzhou, graduating in 1930. She then studied biology at Yenching University, before transferring to the Department of Sociology at Xiamen University, where she earned a BA. She subsequently attended the research institute of Columbia University. She worked in Shanghai and Nanjing, where she became secretary of the Young Women's Christian Association in both cities. In Shanghai she also served as chair of the Shanghai Taiwan Women's Association. Returning to Taiwan in 1946, she became research director of the Women's Campaign Committee. She chaired the Chinese Women's Anti-Communist Federation and the Taiwan Association for the Advancement of Social Undertakings, and was a committee member of the local Red Cross society.

A member of the Kuomintang, she contested the 1948 elections to the Legislative Yuan. Taiwan had eight seats and she finished seventh in the overall vote count. However, the electoral law reserved one of the eight seats for a woman, with votes for female candidates counted separately. As another female candidate Hsieh Er had received more votes than Li, the electoral authorities declared Hsieh elected and gave the other seven seats to the top seven male candidates. Lin took the matter to court, which ruled in her favour and she was declared elected. She remained a member of parliament until the 87th session in 1991.

She died in October 1992.
