= Joséphine Hundt =

Togolese educator and politician

Member of the National Assembly
- In office 1961–1963

Joséphine Hundt was a Togolese educator and politician. In 1961 she was elected to the National Assembly, becoming its first female member.

== Biography ==
Born Joséphine de Medeiros, Hundt became a teacher. She had two children; Berthine born in January 1944 and Sylvia born in 1951.

She was chosen as a candidate of the Party of Togolese Unity (PUT) for the 1961 parliamentary elections. With the PUT as the sole party contesting the elections, she was elected to the National Assembly, becoming its first female member. She was not re-elected in 1963.
