= Elise Rasoamampionona =

Malagasy politician

Secretary of State for the Welfare of Women and Children
- In office 1970–

Member of the National Assembly
- In office 1964–1965
- Constituency: 6th constituency
- In office 1965–
- Constituency: 5th constituency

Elise Rasoamampionona was a Malagasy politician. In 1964 she was elected to the National Assembly, becoming its first female member. In 1970 she was the first woman appointed to the cabinet when she became Secretary of State for the Welfare of Women and Children.

== Biography ==
Rasoamampionona joined the Social Democratic Party and became head of its women's section. Following the death of Stéphenson Rajaona in December 1963, Rasoamampionona was the only candidate to contest the resulting by-election for the 6th constituency in January 1964. She was elected with 397,985 of the 433,000 registered voters voting for her, becoming the first female member of the legislature. She was re-elected from the 5th constituency in the 1965 elections, and became deputy leader of the party. In 1970 she became the first female minister in Madagascar, when she was appointed Secretary of State for the Welfare of Women and Children.
