= Colette Samoya Kirura =

Burundian former politician and diplomat

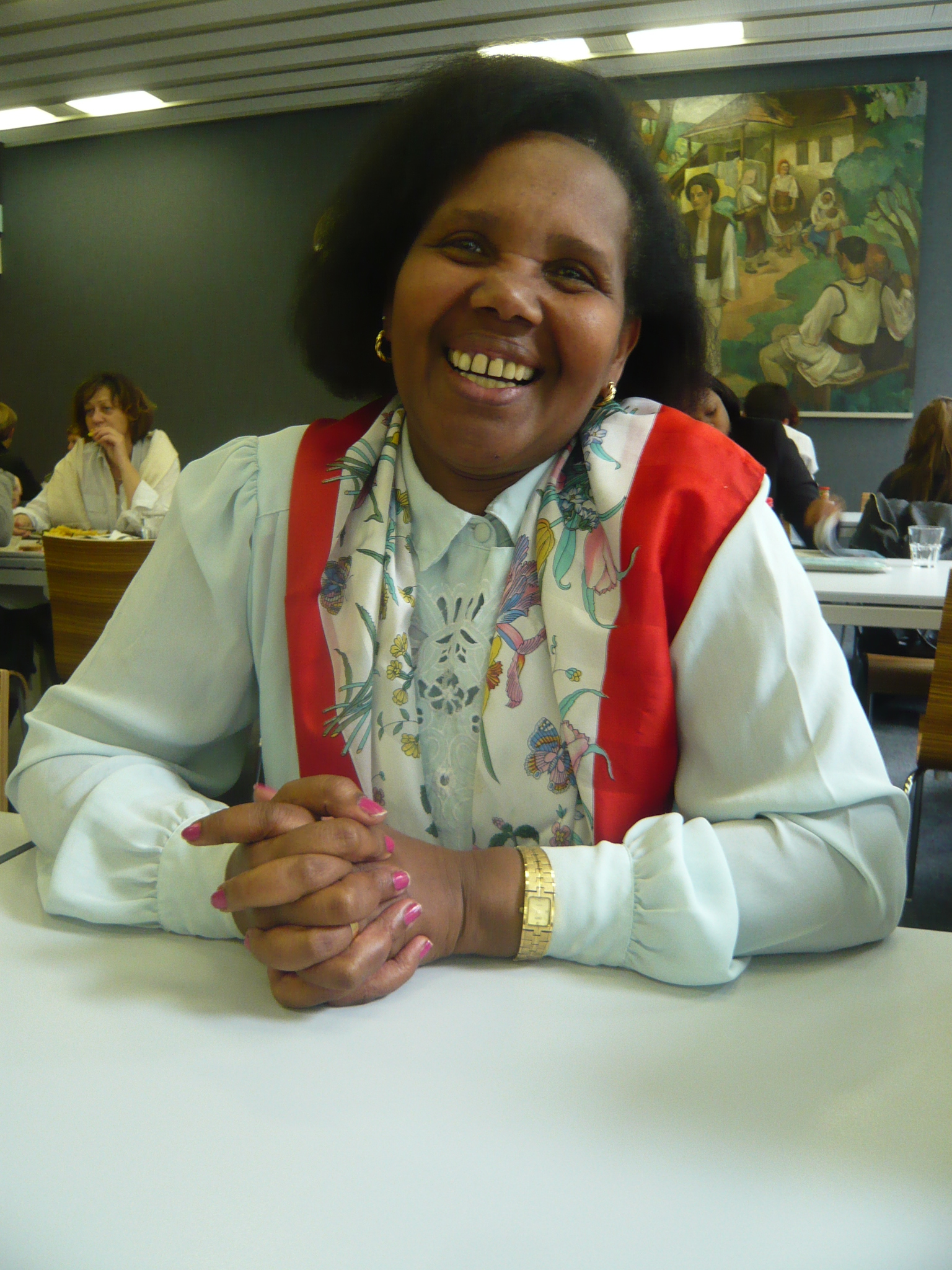
- Samoya Kirura in 2010

Permanent Representative to the United Nations
- In office 1992–1994

Member of the National Assembly
- In office 1982–1987

Personal details
- Born: 1952 (age 73–74) Nyakirwa, Ruanda-Urundi

Colette Samoya Kirura (born 1952) is a Burundian former politician and diplomat. In 1982 she became one of the first group of women in the National Assembly. Ten years later, she was appointed as the country's Permanent Representative to the United Nations.

== Biography ==
Samoya Kirura was born in Nyakirwa in 1952. She was the first girl from her village to attend secondary school and went on to become one of the first Burundian women to earn a master's degree, graduating in geography and history. She subsequently worked as a college professor.

She was a candidate in the 1982 parliamentary elections and was elected to the National Assembly, becoming one of the first group of female members of the legislature. She remained in the National Assembly until the 1987 coup, after which she became head of the Union of Burundian Women, a role she held until 1991.

In 1992 Samoya Kirura was appointed Permanent Representative to the United Nations in Geneva, the first woman to represent Burundi. After leaving the post in 1994, she founded the "Bangwe et dialogue" peace organisation in 1998. She later lived in Geneva and became a consultant for NGO projects. In 2002 she published a book La femme au regard triste (The woman with the sad eyes).
