= Dolores de Miño =

Paraguayan politician

Member of the Chamber of Deputies
- In office 1963–

Personal details
- Born: 27 March 1903 Villeta, Paraguay
- Died: 6 November 1976 (aged 73)

Ramona Dolores Fanego de Miño (27 March 1903 – 6 November 1976) was a Paraguayan politician. In 1963 she and Bienvenida de Sánchez became the first female members of the Chamber of Deputies.

== Biography ==
De Miño was born in Villeta in March 1903. She trained to be a teacher and taught in her hometown for several years. During the Chaco War she established the Commission for Assistance to the Combatants of Chaco, which provided food and medicine to soldiers.

Following the war, she joined the Colorado Party. She was a Colorado Party candidate in the 1963 elections and was elected to the Chamber of Deputies, becoming one of the first two female members alongside Bienvenida de Sánchez.

She died in November 1973.
