= Bahia Al Jishi =

Bahraini civil servant, politician and diplomat

Ambassador to Belgium and Luxembourg
- Incumbent
- Assumed office 2015

Bahraini representative to the European Union and NATO
- Incumbent
- Assumed office 2015

Ambassador to Denmark
- Incumbent
- Assumed office 2019–

Nominated Member of the Consultative Council
- In office 2000–2002

Bahia Jawad Al Jishi (Arabic: بهية جواد الجشي) is a Bahraini civil servant, politician and diplomat. In 2000 she was appointed to the Consultative Council, becoming one of its first female members. She is currently the Bahraini ambassador to Belgium, Denmark and Luxembourg, as well as the country's representative in the European Union and NATO.

== Biography ==
Al Jishi studied for a BA in Arabic literature at Cairo University, subsequently earning an MA in politics and history of the Middle East at the School of Oriental and African Studies in London and a doctorate at Boston University. She began working for Bahrain Broadcasting as a newscaster, presenter and producer, as well as supervising women's and children's programmes in 1971. The following year she also began editing the family, literary and women's sections of the Al-Adhwa newspaper, a role she retained until 1978. In 1975 she left Bahrain Broadcasting to become a newscaster and presenter with BBC Arabic, where she remained until returning to Bahrain Broadcasting as supervisor of children's and women's television programmes in 1978.

In 1979 Al Jishi was appointed director of the Directorate of Children. Between 1988 and 1996 she was also a programme coordinator for UNICEF. She left the Directorate of Children in 2000. In the same year she was one of the drafters of the National Action Charter, and was one of four women appointed to the Consultative Council by Emir Hamad bin Isa Al Khalifa, becoming its first female members. She remained a member until 2002, after which she was an advisor to the Prime Minister's Court until 2004.

Al Jishi was appointed ambassador to Belgium and Luxembourg in 2015, also becoming head of the Bahraini mission to the European Union and ambassador to NATO. In 2019 she was also appointed ambassador to Denmark.
