= Mats'eliso Moshabesha =

Mosotho politician

Member of the National Assembly
- In office 1993–1998
- Constituency: Matala

Personal details
- Died: 2000 Maseru, Lesotho

Virginia Mats'eliso Moshabesha (died 2000) was a Mosotho politician. She was one of the first group of women elected to the National Assembly of Lesotho in 1993.

== Biography ==
Educated in South Africa, Moshabesha trained to be a nurse at Baragwanath and MacCord hospitals, where she earned a certificate in general nursing and a diploma in midwifery. In the early 1970s she attended the Institute of Public Health in Calcutta to study public health nursing and the University of California, Santa Cruz, where she trained to be a family planning practitioner. She worked as a nursing sister and as a co-ordinator for the Lesotho Red Cross. Prior to entering politics, she was a public health nurse for the Lesotho Highlands Water Project.

Moshabesha was a Basutoland Congress Party (BCP) candidate in Matala in the 1993 general elections, and was one of three women elected, becoming the first female members of the National Assembly. She became chief whip for the government. Prior to the 1998 elections she was nominated by the BCP central branch as a potential candidate for Mafeteng, a seat held by Minister of Education Lesao Lehohla. Although a meeting of the constituency branch of the party selected Lehohla as the candidate, the party attempted to rule the election unconstitutional. The matter was eventually brought to the High Court, who ruled in Lehohla's favour. Moshabesha remained a member of the party's central committee until her death at the Queen Elizabeth II hospital in Maseru in 2000.
