= Angélica Esperanza Dacunda =

Argentine politician

National Deputy
- In office 1952–1955
- Constituency: Corrientes

Angélica Esperanza Dacunda was an Argentine politician. She was elected to the Chamber of Deputies in 1951 as one of the first group of female parliamentarians in Argentina.

== Biography ==
In the 1951 legislative elections she was a Peronist Party candidate in Corrientes and was one of the 26 women elected to the Chamber of Deputies. She remained in office until 1955.
