= Ellen 'Maposholi Molapo =

Mosotho politician

Member of the Senate
- In office 1965–

Ellen 'Maposholi Molapo was a Mosotho politician. The first woman to play a prominent role in politics in Lesotho, she became its first female member of Parliament when she was appointed to the Senate in 1965.

== Biography ==
During the 1950s Molapo lived in the Newclare area of Johannesburg, where she was a member of the Garment Workers Union and became an activist for the African National Congress. Having attended first conference of the Basutoland Congress Party (BCP), she began campaigning for the party amongst other Basutoland expatriates working in Transvaal, becoming the first woman amongst the party leadership. She also joined the Pan Africanist Congress and was elected treasurer.

In 1960 she left the BCP after a falling out with party leader Ntsu Mokhehle. She and several other PAC leaders were convicted by South African courts in 1961 for running an illegal organisation, with Molapo receiving a twelve-month sentence. The following year she was deported by the South African authorities. She subsequently became a member of the Marematlou Freedom Party headed by her brother Seth Matotoko, who had lived with her while she was in South Africa. She frequently upstaged Matotoko at campaign rallies with her rhetoric and singing, and was regarded as one of the party's most effective campaigners. In April 1965 she was appointed to the Senate, becoming the country's first female member of parliament.
