= Bienvenida de Sánchez =

Paraguayan politician

Member of the Chamber of Deputies
- In office 1963–

Bienvenida de Sánchez was a Paraguayan politician. In 1963 she and Dolores de Miño became the first female members of the Chamber of Deputies.

== Biography ==
De Sánchez joined the Colorado Party and became chair of its central women's commission. She was a Colorado Party candidate in the 1963 elections and was elected to the Chamber of Deputies, becoming one of the first two female members alongside Dolores de Miño.
