= Herlinda Blanco de Bonilla =

Honduran politician

Member of the National Congress
- In office 1957–

Herlinda Landa Blanco de Bonilla was a Honduran politician. In 1957 she was elected to the Constituent Assembly, becoming one of the first female deputies in Honduras.

== Biography ==
Blanco was a Liberal Party candidate in the 1957 Constituent Assembly elections. She was one three women elected, becoming the first female deputies in Honduras.
