= Carmen Griffin de Lefreve =

Honduran politician

Member of the National Congress
- In office 1957–

Carmen Griffin de Lefreve was a Honduran politician. In 1957 she was elected to the Constituent Assembly, becoming one of the first female deputies in Honduras.

== Biography ==
A prominent member of the Liberal Party in Cortés Department, Griffin was nominated as a candidate by the party for the 1957 Constituent Assembly elections. She was one three women elected, becoming the first female deputies in Honduras.
