= Nelly Wicky =

Swiss politician (1923–2020)

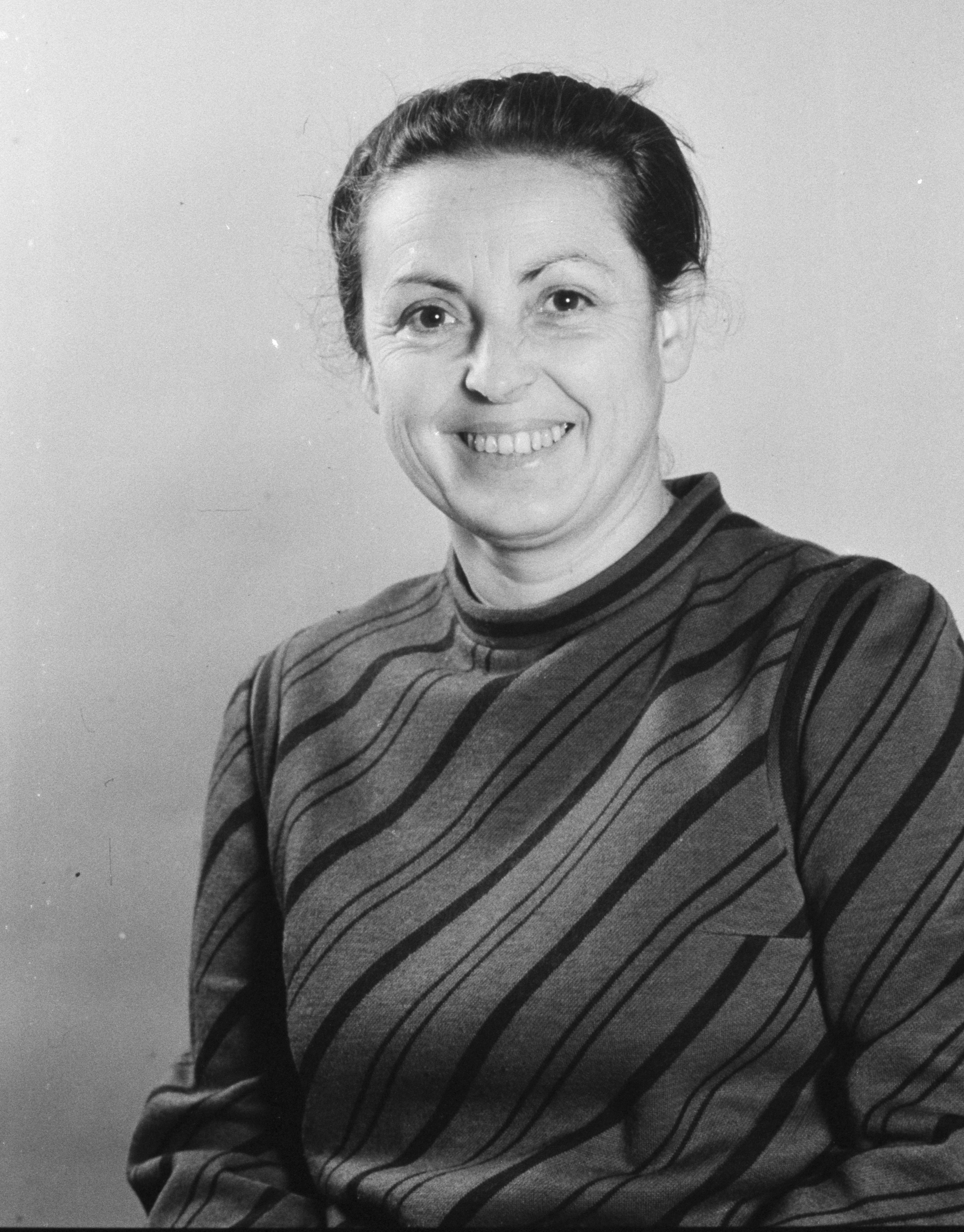

Member of the National Council of Switzerland
- In office 29 November 1971 – 30 November 1975

Personal details
- Born: Nelly Rosset; 2 March 1923 Le Petit-Saconnex, Geneva Switzerland
- Died: 27 January 2020 (aged 96) Onex, Switzerland
- Party: Swiss Party of Labour

Nelly Wicky-Rosset (2 March 1923 – 27 January 2020) was a Swiss politician of the Swiss Labour Party and member of the Swiss National Council (1971–1975). Elected shortly after the introduction of women's suffrage, she was one of the first women in the National Council.

== Biography ==
Nelly Rosset was born on 2 March 1923 in the commune of Le Petit-Saconnex, now a part of the city of Geneva. Her father, Robert Rosset, was a railroad worker. She studied education at the Rousseau Institute where she was a student of the psychologist Jean Piaget. Later Rosset became a teacher in Geneva. In 1948, she married Robert Wicky, who was one of the founders of the Swiss Party of Labour.

Nelly was politically active even as her husband was punished for his political beliefs. In 1963, she was elected to the Geneva Municipal Council. In a referendum of 1971, after Swiss women were granted the right to vote at the federal level and stand for election, she was elected from the Canton of Geneva to the National Council, becoming one of the first 12 women elected to the federal parliament. She served one term and failed to win re-election in the 1975 election. After her defeat, she remained active in politics as a member of the Geneva Municipal Council until 1991 and has a leading figure in the Labor Party until 1998.

Wicky died on 27 January 2020 in the town of Onex. She was preceded in death by her husband, Robert, who died accidentally in 1983.
