= En Sugawara =

Japanese politician (1900–1994)

- 菅原 エン

Member of the House of Representatives
- In office 10 April 1946 – 31 March 1947
- Preceded by: Constituency established
- Succeeded by: Multi-member district
- Constituency: Iwate at-large

Personal details
- Born: 27 February 1900 Higashiiwai, Iwate, Japan
- Died: 16 February 1994 (aged 93)
- Party: Liberal Democratic
- Other political affiliations: Progressive (1946–1947); Democratic (1947)
- Education: Toita Women's College

En Sugawara (Japanese: 菅原エン; 27 February 1900 – 16 February 1994) was a Japanese suffragist and politician. She was one of the first group of women elected to the House of Representatives in 1946.

== Biography ==
Sugawara was born in the village of Shibutami (now part of Ichinoseki) in 1900. She attended Morioka High School for Girls and later graduated from Toita Sewing Teacher's School in 1929. She also became a member of the Iwate Poets' Association.

After World War II, Sugawara joined the Japan Progressive Party. She was a JPP candidate in Iwate in the 1946 general elections (the first in which women could vote), and was elected to the House of Representatives. After the party merged into the Democratic Party, she ran unsuccessfully for the new party in Iwate 2nd district in the 1947 elections. She subsequently contested the 1949 elections as an independent candidate, but failed to be elected.

She died in 1994.
