= 1992 Wallis and Futuna Territorial Assembly election =

Territorial Assembly elections were held in Wallis and Futuna in March 1992. 32 lists competed for the twenty seats in the Territorial Assembly of Wallis and Futuna. The Rally for the Republic won 9 seats, Socialists 6, and independents 5. Thirteen of the MPs were newcomers, and for the first time the Assembly included two women.

Following the election Soane Mani Uhila was elected President of the Assembly, defeating Clovis Logologofolau.
