= Marie-Cécile Collet =

French-Seychellois lawyer and politician

Nominated Member of the Legislative Council
- In office 1948–1950

Marie-Cécile Helene Collet was a French lawyer and politician in the Seychelles. In 1948 she became the first female member of the islands' Legislative Council.

== Biography ==
A lawyer, Collet met her husband Charles Évariste Collet while he was studying medicine in France. She encouraged him to become a barrister. The couple moved to Seychelles in 1946, where both worked as barristers. In 1947 Charles was appointed Attorney General, and the following year became a member of the Legislative Council. In the same year, Marie was also appointed to the Legislative Council as a replacement for Nageon de Lestang, becoming its first female member. She served on the Council until 1950.
