= Widad Haroun =

First Syrian woman to enter parliament

Member of the National Assembly
- In office 1960–1961

Widad Haroun or Widad al-Azhari (Arabic: وداد الأزهري) was a Syrian lawyer and politician. In 1960, she and Jihan al-Mosli were appointed to the National Assembly of the United Arab Republic, becoming the first Syrian woman to enter parliament.

== Biography ==
Originally from Latakia, in July 1960 Haroun was appointed to the National Assembly of the United Arab Republic alongside al-Mosli. They left the Assembly when Syria seceded from the United Arab Republic in September the following year.
