= Jihan al-Mosli =

Member of the National Assembly
- In office 1960–1961

Personal details
- Born: 1908; Damascus, Ottoman Empire
- Died: 1996

Jihan al-Mosli (Arabic: جهان الموصلي, 1908–1996) was a Syrian educator and politician. In 1960, she and Widad Haroun were appointed to the National Assembly of the United Arab Republic, becoming the first Syrian women to enter parliament.

== Biography ==
Al-Mosli was born in Damascus in 1908 to Salih Mosli and Fatima al-Sidawi. Her mother died when she was three years old, after which she was raised by her father. Having demonstrated she could memorise passages from the Quran, she was sent to a local girl's primary school. She later attended teacher training college and obtained a baccalaureate in 1927, after which she studied at a higher teacher college. She subsequently worked as a teacher and became headmistress of a secondary school for girls. In 1944 she became secretary of the Association of Women's Associations. Three years later she earned a law degree.

She stopped wearing a veil in the 1940s, and became an activist for women's rights, demanding the right to vote and stand for election. After the Arab Women's Union moved to Damascus, she became a member of its executive office. Having been involved in politics since the 1920s, when she joined a demonstration to support the National Bloc prior to the 1928 elections, in July 1960 al-Mosli was appointed to the National Assembly of the United Arab Republic alongside Haroun. They left the Assembly when Syria seceded from the United Arab Republic in September the following year.

She never married, and died in 1996.
