= Seferina Rodríguez =

Argentine politician (1916–2010)

Member of the Chamber of Deputies
- In office 1952–1955
- Constituency: Salta

Personal details
- Born: 6 January 1916 Santa Maria, Argentina
- Died: 16 September 2010 (aged 94)

Seferina de Carmen Rodríguez de Copa (6 January 1916 – 16 September 2010) was an Argentine politician. She was elected to the Chamber of Deputies in 1951 as one of the first group of female parliamentarians in Argentina.

== Biography ==
Rodríguez was born in Santa María, Catamarca on 6 January 1916. When she was seven, the family moved to Campo Quijano. She married Francisco Copa, who worked on the General Manuel Belgrano Railway. At the time of the marriage, Francisco started a new job in Tolar Grande and the couple relocated to the village. They later returned to Campo Quinajo so their children could attend school.

Upon her return to Campo Quijano, she established a Perón committee. In the 1951 legislative elections she was a Peronist Party candidate in Salta and was one of the 26 women elected to the Chamber of Deputies. She remained in office until 1955, when her term was cut short by the Revolución Libertadora. Following the coup, she was jailed.

Rodríguez died on 16 September 2010 at the age of 94.
