= Hilda Leonor Pineda de Molins =

Argentine politician

National Senator
- In office 1952–1955
- Constituency: Buenos Aires

Personal details
- Born: 1909

Hilda Leonor Pineda de Molins (born 1909) was an Argentine politician. She was elected to the Senate in 1951 as one of the first group of female parliamentarians in Argentina.

== Biography ==
In the 1951 legislative elections, Leonor was a Peronist Party candidate and one of six women elected to the Senate. Representing Buenos Aires, she became secretary of the Industry and Commerce Committee and sat on the Budget and Finance Committee. In 1954 she became the second vice president of the Senate, briefly serving as president in August 1954; the following year she became first vice president. Her term in office was ended by the Revolución Libertadora in 1955.
