= Tan Tiwu =

Chinese politician

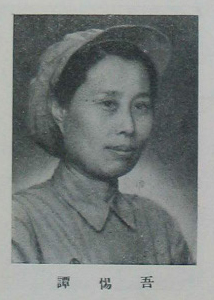

Member of the National People's Congress
- In office 1954–1957

Member of the Legislative Yuan
- In office 1948–1951
- Constituency: Hunan

Personal details
- Born: 9 October 1902
- Died: 10 February 1997 (aged 94) Beijing, China

Tan Tiwu (Chinese: 譚惕吾, 9 October 1902 – 10 February 1997) was a Chinese politician. She was among the first group of women elected to the Legislative Yuan in 1948.

== Biography ==
Originally from Changsha in Hunan Province, Tan graduated from Peking University Law School in 1926. While a student she was involved with the May Thirtieth Movement and was present at the March 18 Massacre. She subsequently worked as an inspector for the Ministry of Internal Affairs from 1930 to 1945. Beginning in the early 1930s, Tan became a leader in Cao Mengjun's New Women Society, a society that critiqued traditional gender norms and encouraged female participation in nationalist goals. In 1935 Tan helped found the Women's National Salvation Association along with members of the New Women Society in Nanjing and Women's Life Society in Shanghai. In 1944 she was a co-founder of the Three People's Principles Association.

In the 1948 elections for the Legislative Yuan, she was a Kuomintang candidate in Hunan province and was elected to parliament. Remaining in China following the Chinese Civil War, she became a member of the Revolutionary Committee of the Chinese Kuomintang (RCCK), attended the first session of the Chinese People's Political Consultative Conference (CPPCC) and was present at the Proclamation of the People's Republic of China. Her membership of the Legislative Yuan was cancelled in 1951. She served in the State Council, was a member of the first National People's Congress, served as director of the China-Soviet Friendship Association and the Chinese People's Committee for World Peace and as deputy head of the organising department for the Chinese People's Association for Resisting American Aid to Korea.

During the Anti-Rightist Campaign, she was labelled a rightist in 1957 and was removed from all of her posts except membership of the Beijing municipal committee of the RCCK. She was delisted as a rightist in November 1960 and reinstated to the State Council in 1962. She was a member of the fifth and eighth National Committee of the CPPCC and a member of the Standing Committee of the sixth and seventh CPPCC. She was fully rehabilitated in 1979, and in her later years chaired the China Association for the Promotion of Peaceful Reunification. She died in Beijing in 1997.
