= Utako Takeuchi =

Japanese politician (born 1915)

- 竹内 歌子

Member of the House of Representatives
- In office 10 April 1946 – 31 March 1947
- Preceded by: Constituency established
- Succeeded by: Multi-member district
- Constituency: Chiba at-large

Personal details
- Born: 15 December 1915 Ushimado, Okayama, Japan
- Party: Democratic

Utako Takeuchi (Japanese: 竹内歌子; born 15 December 1915) was a Japanese journalist and politician. She was one of the first group of women elected to the House of Representatives in 1946.

== Biography ==
Takeuchi was born in Ushimado in 1915. She attended Sanyo High School, after which she became a reporter for Miyako Shinbun. She then worked for Kokusai Tsushinsha and in 1942 became headmistress of the First Tokyo Girls Dress-Designing School. In 1944 she was appointed to the board of directors of Oji Sangyo and in 1946 became president of Boso Sangyo.

After World War II, Takeuchi joined the New Japan Youth Party and became head of its women's section. She was a candidate for the party in Chiba in the 1946 general elections (the first in which women could vote), and was elected to the House of Representatives. She ran for re-election in 1947 as a Democratic Party candidate in Saitama 1st district, but failed to retain her seat.
