= Angèle Mukakayange =

Rwandan politician

Angèle Mukakayange was a Rwandan politician. She was the first woman to be elected as a member of parliament in Rwanda.

Angèle Mukakayange was elected as a MDR-Parmehutu Deputy for Butare in the 1965 Rwandan general election. She lost her seat in the 1969 election.
