= Kimi Ohashi =

Japanese politician (1905–1999)

- 大橋 喜美

Member of the House of Representatives
- In office 10 April 1946 – 31 March 1947
- Preceded by: Constituency established
- Succeeded by: Multi-member district
- Constituency: Miyazaki at-large

Personal details
- Born: 29 January 1905 Kanuma, Tochigi, Japan
- Died: 1 June 1999 (aged 94)
- Party: Democratic Liberal
- Other political affiliations: CDP (1946–1947); NCP (1947); DP (1947–1948)
- Education: Tokyo Women's Higher Normal School

Kimi Ohashi (Japanese: 大橋 喜美; 29 January 1905 – 1 June 1999) was a Japanese politician. She was one of the first group of women elected to the House of Representatives in 1946.

== Biography ==
Ohashi was born in Kanuma in 1905. She graduated from Tokyo Women's Higher Normal School in 1925, after which she worked as a teacher at Shimane Prefectural Hamada High School and Otsu City High School in Shiga Prefecture. Following her marriage, she moved to Nobeoka in Miyazaki Prefecture, but returned to Kanuma after her husband's death, becoming a teacher at Tochigi Prefectural Kanuma High School.

After World War II, Ohashi contested the Miyazaki district in the 1946 general elections as a Cooperative Democratic Party candidate, and was elected to the House of Representatives. Following the elections she joined the National Cooperative Party. However, she was a Democratic Party candidate in Miyazaki 1st district in the 1947 elections, losing her seat. She ran unsuccessfully again in Tochigi 1st district in the 1949 elections.

Ohashi later became a member of Soka Gakkai. She died in 1999 at the age of 94.
