= Tama Nakayama =

Japanese politician (1889–1971)

- 中山 タマ

Member of the House of Representatives
- In office 10 April 1946 – 31 March 1947
- Preceded by: Constituency established
- Succeeded by: Constituency abolished
- Constituency: Hyōgo 1st

Personal details
- Born: 28 June 1889 Tsuna, Hyōgo, Japan
- Died: 5 October 1971 (aged 82)
- Party: Democratic
- Other political affiliations: LDP (after 1955)
- Education: Nippon Medical School; University of Osaka

Tama Nakayama (Japanese: 中山タマ, 28 June 1889 – 5 October 1971) was a Japanese physician and politician. She was one of the first group of women elected to the House of Representatives in 1946.

== Biography ==
Nakayama was born in Kariya in Hyōgo Prefecture (now part of Awaji). She attended Nippon Medical School, earning a doctor's licence in 1911. She began practicing in Kobe the following year and worked as a school physician at Hyōgo Prefectural First Girls' School and Suhozan Girls' High School. She also worked at Suzurandai Hospital.

Nakayama contested the Hyōgo 1st district in the 1946 general elections as an independent candidate, and was elected to the House of Representatives. She was a Democratic Party candidate in the 1947 elections, but failed to be re-elected. She subsequently earned a doctoral degree in medicine from Osaka University in 1949, and became a member of the Liberal Democratic Party.

She died in 1971.
