= Tsuko Yamashita =

Japanese politician (1899–1987)

- 山下 ツ子

Member of the House of Representatives
- In office 10 April 1946 – 31 March 1947
- Preceded by: Constituency established
- Succeeded by: Multi-member district
- Constituency: Kumamoto at-large

Personal details
- Born: 5 January 1899 Kumamoto, Japan
- Died: 12 July 1987 (aged 88)
- Party: Socialist
- Other political affiliations: National (1946–1947)
- Education: Tokyo Women's Higher Normal School

Tsuko Yamashita (Japanese: 山下ツ子; 5 January 1899 – 12 July 1987) was a Japanese educator and politician. She was one of the first group of women elected to the House of Representatives in 1946.

== Biography ==
Yamashita was born in Kumamoto in 1899. She was educated at Nara Girls' Higher Normal School, after which she became a teacher, teaching at Kumamoto First Girls' High School and in Nagasaki. She also became a leader of the Mothers' League.

After World War II, Yamashita was an independent candidate in Kumamoto in the 1946 general elections (the first in which women could vote), and was elected to the House of Representatives. Following the elections Yamashita joined the Japan Socialist Party. She lost her seat in the 1947 elections and ran unsuccessfully in the 1956 House of Councillors elections. She died in 1987.
