= Madeleine Léo-Lagrange =

French lawyer, politician and judge

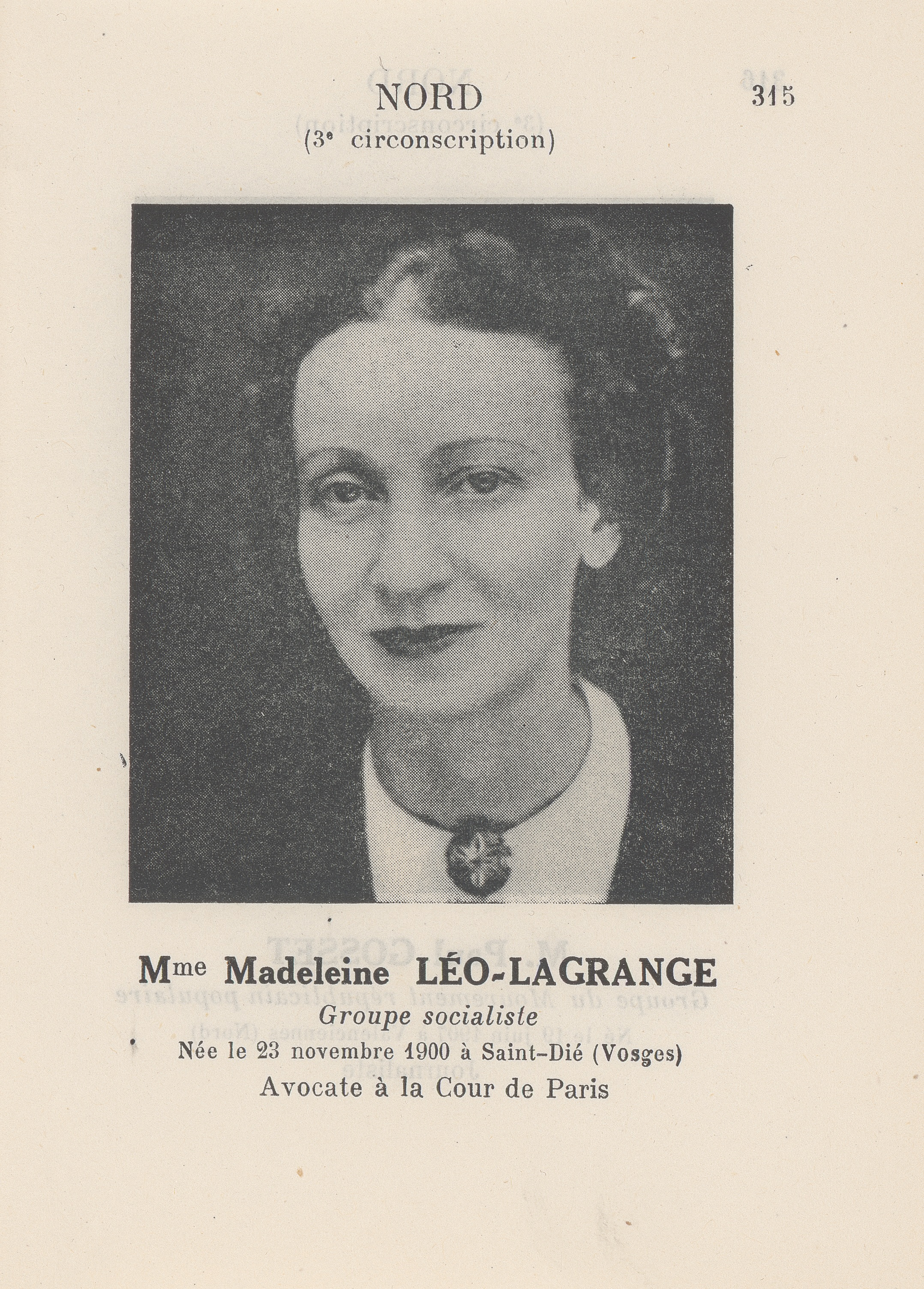

Member of the National Assembly
- In office 1945–1946
- Constituency: Nord

Personal details
- Born: 23 November 1900 Saint-Dié-des-Vosges, France
- Died: 12 April 1992 (aged 91) Paris, France
- Party: SFIO

Madeleine Léo-Lagrange (23 November 1900 – 12 April 1992) was a French lawyer, politician and judge. She was elected to the National Assembly in 1945 as one of the first group of French women in parliament. She served in the National Assembly until June the following year.

== Biography ==
Léo-Lagrange was born Madeleine Weiller in Saint-Dié-des-Vosges in 1900 to a secular, middle class Jewish family. Her father was a doctor and president of the French Society of Practitioners. She was educated at the Lycée Molière in Paris, after which she studied law at the University of Paris. She met Léo Lagrange, a fellow lawyer, in 1922 and the couple married two years later. In the same year she was called to the bar, becoming one of the first female lawyers in France.

During the early 1920s she joined the French Section of the Workers' International (SFIO). In 1932 Léo was elected to the National Assembly, and was re-elected in 1936. However, he was killed by German forces in 1940. During the German occupation, rules preventing Jews appearing in court as lawyers interrupted her legal career.

Following the war, she was appointed office manager of Minister of Prisons Henri Frenay. She was an SFIO candidate in Nord department in the 1945 National Assembly elections. The third-placed candidate on the SFIO list, she was elected to parliament, becoming one of the first group of women in the National Assembly. During her term in office she was a member of the Commission for National Education and Fine Arts, Youth, Sports and Leisure and the Commission for the Press, Radio and Cinema. However, she did not run for re-election in the July 1946 elections.

She subsequently worked for deputy minister Andrée Viénot and president of the Council of Ministers, Paul Ramadier. In 1948 she was appointed a magistrate in Lille, later transferring to Versailles and Paris. She resigned from the judiciary during the Algerian War, stating her role was in conflict with her views on human rights. She asked to be reinstated after the signing of the Évian Accords in 1962, before taking early retirement the following year.

She died in Paris in 1992.
