= 1937 Dominican general election =

General elections were held in Dominica in April 1937. The elections were the first held under the 1936 constitution, which granted elected members parity with appointed members, although the Administrator retained a casting vote.

== Electoral system ==
The Legislative Council had eleven members; the Administrator as president, two ex officio members, three appointed members and five elected members. The Administrator could vote only to break a tie.

== Results ==
Constituency	Elected member
Eastern	Lennox Pelham Napier
Northern	Howell Donald Shillingford
Southern	John Baptiste Charles
Town	Ralph Edgar Alford Nicholls
Western	Phillip Alexander Rolle
Source: Pierre

The appointed members were Sydney Green, Frederick Robert Galloway and William James Ross Stebbings.

== Aftermath ==
Garraway resigned on 5 April 1938 and was replaced by Arthur Seagar Burleigh. Napier resigned on 31 December 1939 and a by-election was held on 28 February 1940. Elma Napier was elected, becoming the island's first female MLC.

Elections were due in 1940, but the term of the council was extended by the Dominica (Legislative Council – Extension of duration) Order in Council 1940 due to World War II.

Green resigned in 1940 and was replaced by I. N. Shillingford. Shillingford subsequently resigned in 1942 and was replaced by Clement Joseph Leonard Dupigny. Stebbings resigned in 1943 and was replaced by James O. Aird.
