= Qian Ying (Kuomintang politician) =

Chinese politician

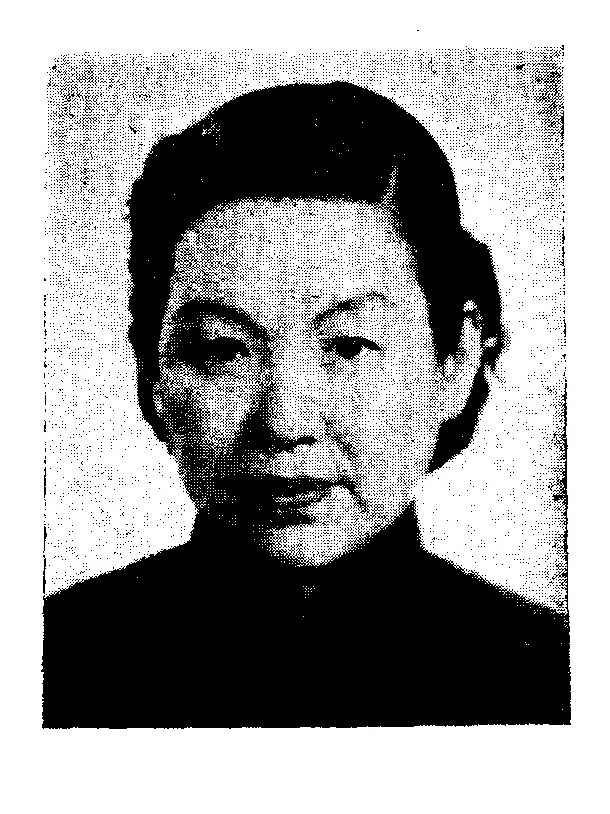

Member of the Legislative Yuan
- In office 1948–
- Constituency: Zhejiang

Qian Ying (Chinese: 錢英) was a Chinese politician. She was among the first group of women elected to the Legislative Yuan in 1948.

== Biography ==
Qian attended Zhejiang Public Legislative and Political College. She worked as a teacher at Hangzhou Xinqun Senior High School and became president of Zhejiang Shengliu Semi-monthly Press. She also served as executive director of Zhejiang Women's Association and as a member of Hangzhou City City.

Qian was a Kuomintang candidate in Zhejiang in the 1948 elections for the Legislative Yuan, and was elected to parliament. She relocated to Taiwan during the Chinese Civil War, where she remained a member of the Legislative Yuan.
