= Fu Yan (politician) =

Chinese politician

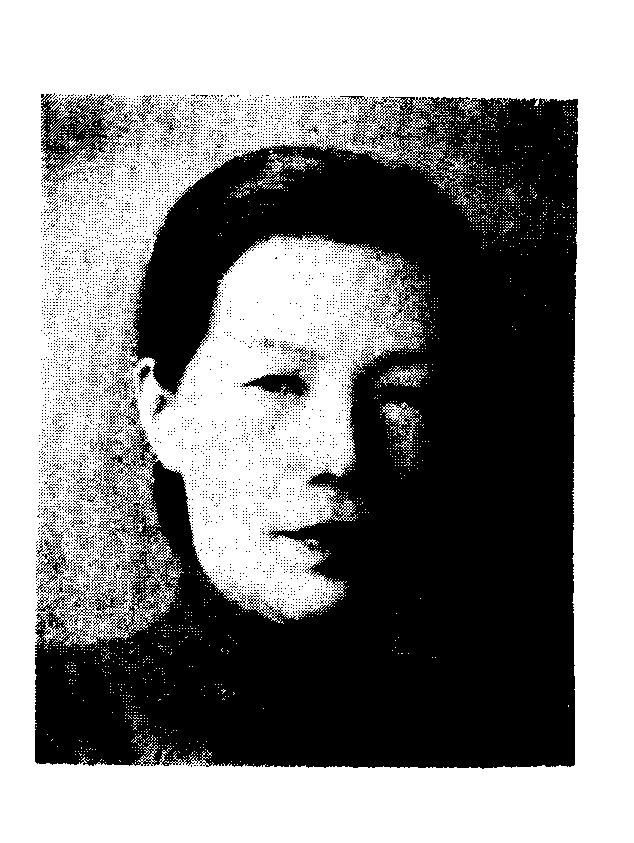

Member of the Legislative Yuan
- In office 1948–
- Constituency: Henan

Personal details
- Born: 1903

Fu Yan (Chinese: 傅岩, born 1903, date of death unknown) was a Chinese politician. She was among the first group of women elected to the Legislative Yuan in 1948.

== Biography ==
Fu attended Nankai University in Tianjin and graduated from the Department of Political Science at the National University of Peking. She went on to earn a master's degree in public administration at California State University. She subsequently taught at National Normal University, the Central Police College, National Lanzhou University and the Great China University.

She was a Kuomintang candidate in Henan province in the 1948 elections to the Legislative Yuan, in which she was elected to parliament. During the Chinese Civil War she relocated to Taiwan.
