= Or Hsieh =

Taiwanese physician, educator and politician

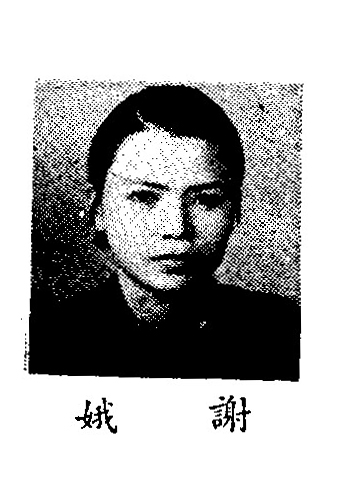

Member of the Legislative Yuan
- In office 1948–1949
- Constituency: Taiwan

Personal details
- Born: January 1918 Báng-kah, Taiwan
- Died: 1995

Or Hsieh or Hsieh Er (Chinese: 謝娥; January 1918 – 1995) was a Taiwanese physician, educator and politician. The first female surgeon from Taiwan, she was also one of the first group of women elected to the Legislative Yuan in 1948.

== Biography ==
Hsieh was born in 1918 in Báng-kah, the second of four children of Hsieh Quan, who owned a restaurant. She attended Laosong Public School and Taihoku Prefectural Taihoku Third Girls' High School. She graduated in April 1935 as the third-best student in her class, after which she attended Tokyo Women's Medical College, graduating with honours in April 1940. She subsequently became the first Taiwanese woman to work as a surgeon, joining St. Luke's International Hospital in Tokyo. She returned to Taiwan in 1943, becoming an assistant professor in the medical department of the Taipei Imperial University.

While working at the university, Hsieh began reading the works of Lu Xun, Ba Jin and Lao She. She began discussing anti-Japanese action with a group of five others in a temple in Xizhi. However, they were arrested in 1944 and Hsieh was imprisoned and tortured. She was given the option of release as long as she co-operated with the Japanese authorities, but refused. She remained in prison until the end of World War II. After her release in September 1945, she opened the a surgical hospital in Taiping in November, providing free treatment for the poor.

In 1945 she joined the Kuomintang and set up the Taipei Women's Association. In March 1946 she was elected to Taipei City Council, becoming its only female member. She was a member of Taipei City Party Affairs Planning Committee between August and October 1946. She was a representative of Taiwan at the 1946 Constituent Assembly that drew up the Constitution of the Republic of China. Her surgical practice was destroyed following the February 28 incident after she made a radio broadcast downplaying the violence.

Hsieh contested the 1948 elections to the Legislative Yuan, becoming one of the first group of women elected to the Chinese legislature, and the candidate with the sixth-most votes. However, she steadily withdrew from legislative activities, and left Taiwan the following year, initially for France, before settling in the United States. She received a doctorate in public medicine from Columbia University, subsequently working at Oregon State Hospital and the New York State Department of Health, where she was deputy director.

She returned to Taiwan in 1991 and died in 1995.
