= Elisabeth Johansen =

Greenlandic midwife and politician (1907–1993)

- 1973
- Born: Elisabeth Maria Sara Johansen; 1 August 1907; Uummannaq, Greenland
- Died: 21 June 1993 (aged 85); Uummannaq, Greenland
- Citizenship: Danish
- Occupations: midwife, politician
- Years active: 1931–1975

Elisabeth Johansen (1 August 1907 – 21 June 1993) was a Greenlandic midwife and politician. She was the first certified midwife in the country, as well as the first woman to attain a political office in Greenland. She was the first women appointed Knight of the Order of the Dannebrog.

== Early life ==
Elisabeth Maria Sara Johansen was born on 1 August 1907 in Uummannaq, Greenland to Johanne Marie Gjertrud Fleichser and Johan Emil Hans Henningsen (da). Her father was a local council member of the Confederated Cabinet between 1862 and 1863 and in 1911 became a noted member of the North Greenland Provincial Council. Her childhood, as was typical for upper-class girls, did not include schooling. In 1923, Johansen took a post with a Danish family who were traveling as a nanny and was encouraged by her employer's wife to train as a midwife. In 1925, Johansen traveled to Denmark and began training despite her father's skepticism that she would be successful. In 1931, Johansen passed her midwifery examination at the Rigshospitalet with the highest scores in her class, becoming the first Greenlander to be certified as a midwife.

== Career ==
Returning to Greenland that same year, Johansen began working in North Greenland under the primitive conditions that existed at the time. Often serving as the bookkeeper, cook and interpreter for the hospital, in addition to her midwifery, she assisted the doctor during surgical procedures. On 23 July 1938, she married Karl Isak Kristian Victor Johansen, a trading manager, and the two moved to Ukkusissat. Continuing her work as a midwife, she began her family then, giving birth to three children: Astrid (1938), Severin (1941) and Henrik Kristian (1943). In 1946, they moved to Illorsuit, in western Greenland, where her last two children, Lars Emil (1946) and Ole (1950) were born. Despite her growing family, Johansen was active in the community as well as in her practice, often using her home for consultations and patients. She established a women's association for the village in 1956.

When her husband died in 1958, Johansen returned to her home town in Uummannaq because the schools were of higher quality. The following year, she ran for election as the Uummannaq district representative to the Greenland National Council. Women had earned the right to vote in 1948, but no candidates ran in the 1951 election, which was the first time women were able to participate. Johansen, who was supported by the Greenland Workers' Association, and the fishery and prison organizations was one of the first candidates to campaign actively, taking a dogsled or a boat to speak with constituents. Her election in 1959 marked the first time a woman served, and she would be the only woman to serve on the council before it was dissolved in 1979 upon formation of the Greenland Home Rule Government.

During Johansen's tenure, many issues emerged which had to do with the modernization and urbanization of the country. She took special interest in closures of village facilities and believed that relocating residents and prisoners to urban areas would create problems. She pressed the council to create schools to educate prisoners and fishermen so that they would be able to earn living wages. Johansen opposed the birthright criteria, which allowed people born in Denmark to receive higher wages for the same position than native Greenlanders earned and was the only council member to stand against the policy. In 1960, she was the recipient of the Silver Royal Medal of Recompense for her public service. Johansen was active in programs aimed at alcohol abuse and in 1969, was appointed as a member of the committee for Greenlandic Women's Relations. This committee conducted studies and published four reports about the living conditions of women in the country. In 1973, she was appointed Knight of the Order of the Dannebrog, the first woman to be awarded the distinction.

Johansen retired in 1975, but continued to remain active in spite of a degenerative eye disease. In 1977, she joined the Siumut Party, a social democratic political party in Greenland. She was made an honorary citizen of Uummannaq in 1981 and was awarded the silver Medal for Meritorious Service by the Greenland Home Rule government in 1989.

== Death and legacy ==
Johansen died on 21 June 1993 in Uummannaq. She is remembered as the "Only Man" to stand against the birthright policy and as a role model for other women wishing to enter politics. Two of her children, Severin and Lars also entered politics.
