= 1958 Colombian parliamentary election =

Parliamentary elections were held in Colombia on 16 March 1958 to elect the Senate and Chamber of Representatives. They were the first elections held under the National Front agreement, which only allowed the Conservative Party and the Liberal Party to contest the elections, and allocated 50% of the seats in both houses to each party. As a result, the main contest at the elections was between factions within each party.

== Results ==
=== Senate ===
Party and faction		Votes	%	Seats
Colombian Liberal Party		2,105,171	57.67	40
Colombian; Conservative; Party	Laureanistas	1,545,262	42.33	28
Colombian; Conservative; Party	Ospinistas	1,545,262	42.33	10
Colombian; Conservative; Party	Independientes	1,545,262	42.33	2
Colombian; Conservative; Party	Total	1,545,262	42.33	40
Total		3,650,433	100.00	80
Valid votes		3,650,433	99.86	
Invalid/blank votes		5,041	0.14	
Total votes		3,655,474	100.00	
Registered voters/turnout		5,365,191	68.13	
Source: Nohlen

=== Chamber of Representatives ===
Party and faction		Votes	%	Seats
Colombian Liberal Party		2,132,741	57.81	74
Colombian; Conservative; Party	Doctrinarios	925,856	25.10	49
Colombian; Conservative; Party	Unionistas	446,894	12.11	19
Colombian; Conservative; Party	Alzatistas	150,155	4.07	6
Colombian; Conservative; Party	Others	33,368	0.90	0
Colombian; Conservative; Party	Total	1,556,273	42.19	74
Total		3,689,014	100.00	148
Valid votes		3,689,014	99.87	
Invalid/blank votes		4,925	0.13	
Total votes		3,693,939	100.00	
Registered voters/turnout		5,365,191	68.85	
Source: Nohlen
