= 1986 Mozambican general election =

- 15 October–15 December 1986

All 249 seats in the People's Assembly 125 seats needed for a majority
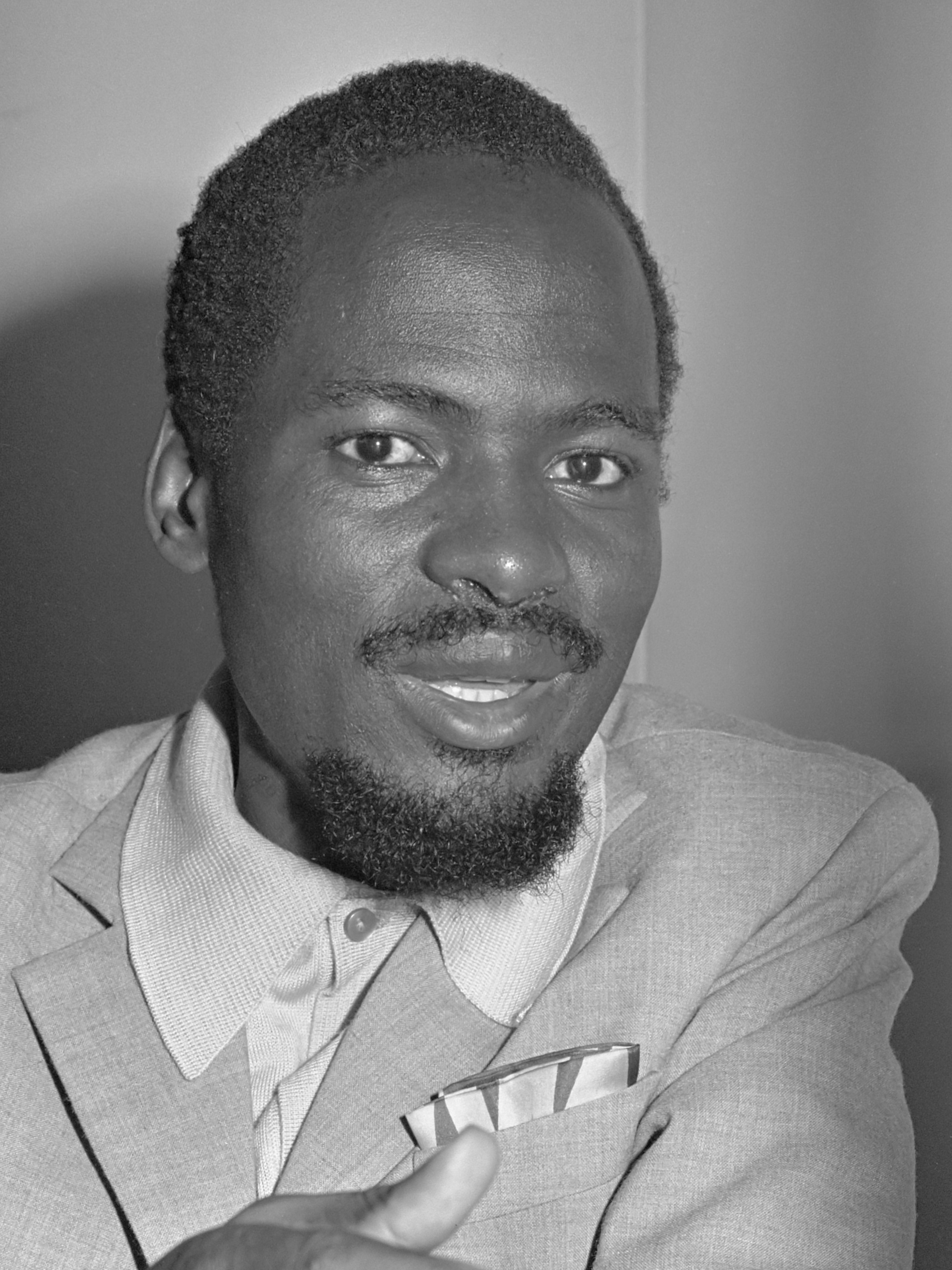
	First party
Leader	Joaquim Chissano
Party	FRELIMO
Seats won	249
- Seats by province. Territory under control of RENAMO in gray.
President before election
Samora Machel
FRELIMO
Elected President
Joaquim Chissano
FRELIMO

General elections were held in Mozambique in 1986. As in the previous election FRELIMO was the sole legal party, but in this election independent candidates could stand as long as they were nominated by FRELIMO.

Direct elections were only held for local and city councils, starting on 15 October. These councils then elected District Assemblies by 25 November, which in turn elected Provincial Assemblies by December. 299 candidates stood for election for the 249-seat People's Assembly, the country's top legislative body, and were voted on by the Provincial Assemblies by 15 December. In addition to the 249 successful candidates, an additional 10 people were chosen as reserve members.
