= Assembly of the Republic (Mozambique) =

Unicameral legislature of Mozambique

Assembly of the Republic Assembleia da República

Type
- Type: Unicameral

History
- Founded: 1977

Leadership
- President of the Assembly: Margarida Talapa, FRELIMO since 13 January 2025

Structure
- Seats: 250
- Political groups: Government (171): FRELIMO (171); Opposition (79): PODEMOS (43); RENAMO (28); MDM (8)

Elections
- Voting system: Party-list proportional representation using D'Hondt method with 5% election threshold
- First election: 25 September 1977
- Last election: 9 October 2024
- Next election: 2029

Meeting place
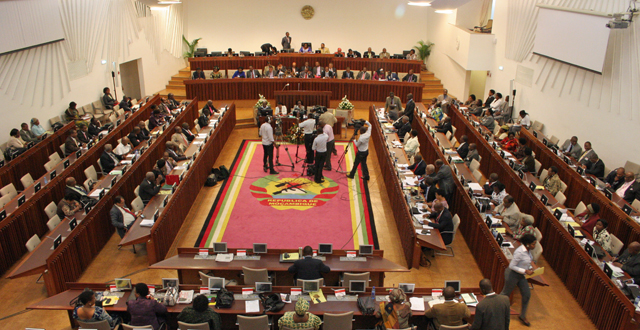
- Palácio da Assembleia da República; Maputo, Mozambique

Website
- www.parlamento.mz

The Assembly of the Republic (Portuguese: Assembleia da República) is the unicameral legislative body of the Republic of Mozambique, established in 1977.

The current parliament has 250 members, who are directly elected through a system of party-list proportional representation and serve five-year terms. Parties must receive at least five percent of the vote nationally to gain parliamentary representation. The 250 members of the Assembly of the Republic are elected by proportional representation in eleven multi-member constituencies based on the country's ten provinces and the capital region, with district magnitude ranging from 14 to 45, and through first-past-the-post voting in two single-member constituencies representing Mozambican citizens in Africa and Europe. Seats in the multi-member constituencies are allocated using the d'Hondt method, with an electoral threshold of 5%

Parliamentary debates and business are conducted entirely in Portuguese. Three parties are represented in the parliament: FRELIMO, RENAMO and the Democratic Movement of Mozambique. After the 2014 election, RENAMO MPs have refused to take office, since the party considered the electoral act had been fraudulent, but they resumed their duties in February 2015.

== Committees and commissions ==
The assembly has eight departmental commissions/committees: Constitutional Affairs, Human Rights and Legality; International Relations; Petitions; Planning and Budget; Social Affairs, Gender and Environmental; Public Administration, Local Government and Media; Agriculture, Rural Development, Economic Activities and Services; and Defense and Public Order. There is also one house management committee called the Parliamentary Ethics Committee.

Another body within the Assembly of the Republic called the Standing Commission coordinates when either the whole assembly or assembly committees convene. It consists of the President of the Assembly, Vice Presidents of the Assembly, and elected deputees. The Standing Commission stays in office at the end of a legislative term until the first meeting of the new assembly. This is also the case if the assembly were to dissolve.

During intermissions between assembly meetings, the Standing Commission can establish committees for urgent matters. Other powers of the Standing Commission include permitting the President of the Republic to go on State visits to other nations, providing opinions before a declaration of war, authorizing states of emergency or siege when the assembly is not on session, interpreting assembly bylaws when the assembly is in intermission, and announcing when deputies are suspensed, resign, or lose office.

== Powers ==
Article 179 of Mozambique's constitution assigns several powers to the Assembly of the Republic. This includes the power to pass constitional laws and ratify laws decreed by the executive branch's Council of Ministers. It also includes territorial powers such as determining the country's borders and making decisions on territorial divides.

The assembly has responsibilities over state finance such as approving the State Budget and defining the foundations of the country's tax policy and tax system. The assembly must make decisions on the major options in the State Budget as well as the country's Economic and Social Plan. Reports are made on how these decisions will be implemented. Additionally, the assembly must authorize and define the general conditions under which the government can give loans, carry out credit transactions lasting more than one financial year, and set the maximum limit on guarantees the State can make.

The assembly ratifies multiple government actions. The assembly ratifies the President of the Republic's nominees for President and Vice President of the Supreme Court, President of the Constitutional Council, and President of the Administrative Tribunal. It can also ratify or terminate international treaties, including treaties with international defense organizations. It ratifies states of emergency or siege as well, which suspends constitutional guarantees and freedoms other than the right to life, citizenship, personal identity, religious freedom, civil capacity, non-retroactive application of the law, and a defendant's right to a defense.

Other powers of the assembly include electing the Ombudsman, approving electoral law and referendum rules, approving or terminating treaties within their jurisdiction, deciding on reports about the Council of Minsters' activies, and deciding on security and defense policy after consulting with the National Defence and Security Council.

== Presidents of the Assembly ==
The President of the Assembly is the second-highest figure in the state hierarchy of Mozambique, and will replace the President of Mozambique in case of incapacity. The permanent position of President of the Assembly was only established in 1986. Previously the position was filled by the President of the People's Republic of Mozambique.

Members of the Assembly of the Republic elect the President of the Assembly amongst themselves; Vice Presidents of the Assembly are also nominated by the parties with the most representation and elected by the assembly. They can fill in for the President of the Assembly if he/she is absent or unable to fulfill the role. The President of the Assembly of the Republic is responsible for convening the assembly; representing the assembly publicly and internationally; signing laws before submitting them for enactment; promoting relations between the Assembly of the Republic and provincial assemblies; ordering and signing public resolutions from the assembly, and ensuring compliance with the assembly's decisions.

Name	Took office	Left office	Notes
Samora Machel	1977	1986	Ex officio
Marcelino dos Santos	1986	1994	
Eduardo Mulémbwè	1994	2009	
Verónica Macamo	12 January 2010	13 January 2020	
Esperança Bias	13 January 2020	13 January 2025	
Margarida Talapa	13 January 2025	Incumbent	

== Latest election ==
Party	Seats	+/–
FRELIMO	171	-13
PODEMOS	43	New
RENAMO	28	–32
Democratic Movement of Mozambique	8	+2
Total	250	0
Source: Club of Mozambique

== Historical composition ==
PODEMOS / FRELIMO / MDM / RENAMO / RENAMO–UE / UD
1977	226
1986	249
1994	129 / 112 / 9
1999	133 / 117
2004	160 / 90
2009	191 / 8 / 51
2014	144 / 17 / 89
2019	184 / 6 / 60
2024	43 / 171 / 8 / 28

== See also ==
- History of Mozambique
- Legislative Branch
- List of national legislatures
