= 1977 Mozambican general election =

- 25 September 1977

All 226 seats in the People's Assembly
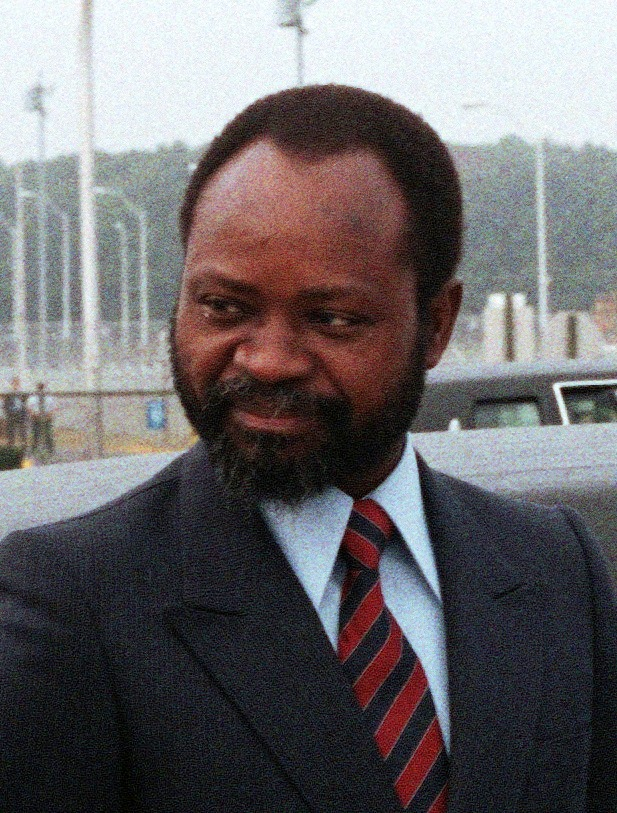
	First party
Leader	Samora Machel
Party	FRELIMO
Seats won	226
- Organization of the electoral process by levels. In gray, the areas affected by the Rhodesian military incursion.
President before election
Samora Machel
FRELIMO
Elected President
Samora Machel
FRELIMO

General elections were held in Mozambique in 1977. They were the first elections after independence from Portugal, and FRELIMO was the sole legal party.

Direct elections were only held for local and city councils, starting on 25 September. These councils then elected members of their local councils to the District Assemblies, which in turn elected representatives to the Provincial Assemblies. FRELIMO produced a single list of shortlisted candidates for the newly created 226-seat People's Assembly, the country's top legislative body. The candidate list was unanimously adopted by the Provincial Assemblies at their first session.
