= Marie Zettler =

German politician and journalist (1885–1950)

Marie Zettler (13 November 1885 – 5 February 1950) was a German politician and commentator/journalist. A member of the Catholic-centrist Bavarian People's Party ("Bayerische Volkspartei" / BVP), and with women now permitted to stand for election, in 1919 she became one of a number of women elected to what became known as the Weimar National Assembly, mandated to draw up a republican constitution for a newly post-imperial Germany. She also served, for more than forty years, as Secretary for Bavaria of the German Catholic Women's Association ("Katholischer Deutscher Frauenbund" / KDFB).

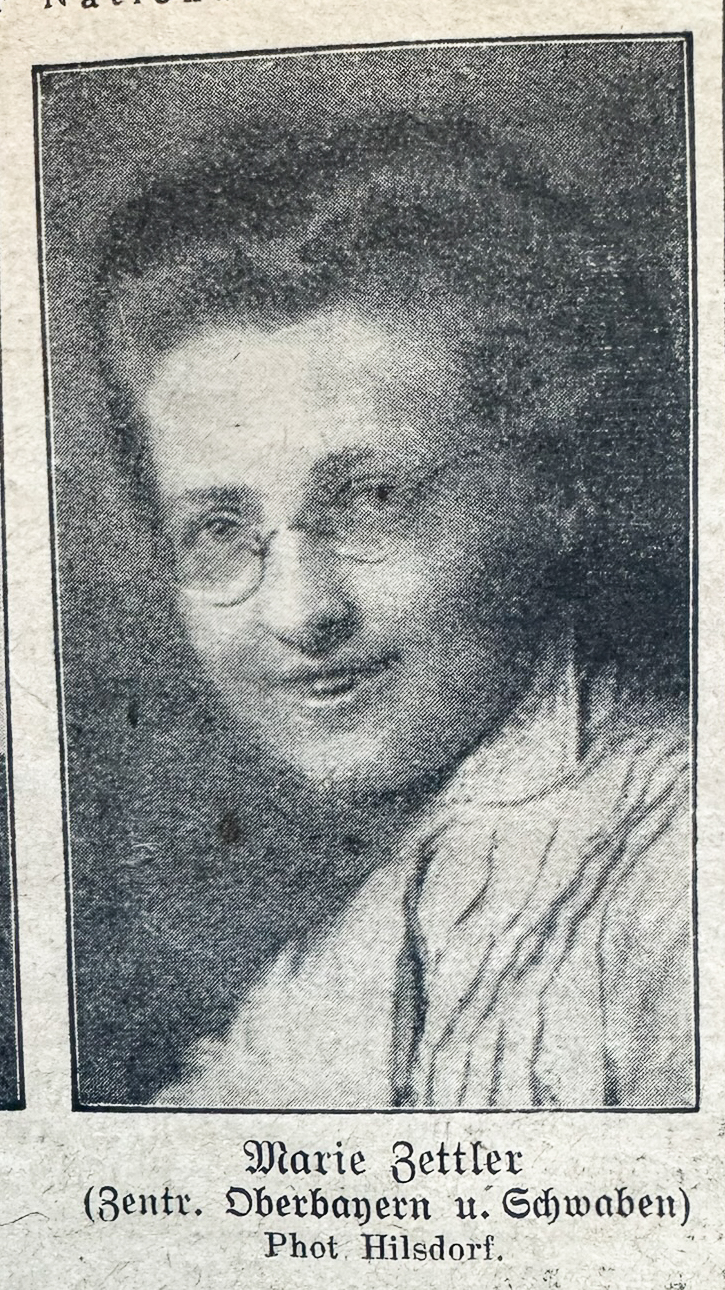
Marie Zettler 1919 Member of the Weimar National Assembly

== Biography ==
=== Provenance and early years ===
Marie Zettler was born in Mering, a short distance outside Augsburg in western Bavaria, the seventh of ten recorded children of Ludwig, a ceramics creaftsman, and Josefine Zettler. Her parents were committed Catholics and she was educated according to firm religious principles. Her youthful enthusiasms extended widely, taking in Music, the Natural Sciences, Literature and the Arts. Given the religious context of her upbringing she was naturally also interested in Theology and Philosophy. In 1889 she was enrolled at an Educational Establishment in Pasing (Munich) which was unusual in that it was headed up by English women. After three years she returned home to her family where she helped look after the household, educate her younger siblings and support her father's business on the administrative side. Typical of women's rights activists during this period was her intense appetite for education. In 1911 she teamed up with her long standing life partner Marie Buczkowska to attend a two-month further education teaching course in Mönchen-Gladbach on Popular Economics for Catholic Germany. She subsequently undertook a training in social work at the Katholische Stiftungshochschule München (Catholic Social-Charity Women's Academy Munich) that had been set up by Ellen Ammann of the BVP.

Zettler was elected Secretary for Bavaria of the German Catholic Women's Association on 1 January 1912. She would hold the position for more than forty years. She was one of many who backed Cardinal (as he became in 1917) Michael von Faulhaber's vision for an association of members in religious orders, but without any standardised form or religious dress. The underlying point was to open up the ideals of the religious order to the secular world. Marie Zettler worked within this "Societas Religiosa" as a schooling head. Alongside these tasks and her KDFB responsibilities she served on the executive committee of the "Association of German Catholic Women Social Administrators" ("Verein katholischer deutscher Sozialbeamtinnen e.V. ").

=== German ("Weimar") Republic 1919–1933 ===
In February 1919, Marie Zettler was one of six women from the Catholic Centre Party and its Bavarian affiliate to become a member of the Weimar National Assembly. (Note: The other five women members of the National Assembly from the Catholic Centre Party were Hedwig Dransfeld, Agnes Neuhaus, Maria Schmitz, Christine Teusch and the formidable Helene Weber.) Zettler represented the "Upper Bavaria and Schwabing" A focus of her interests in the assembly was the question of childcare. She advocated the strengthening of the family because she believed that a healthy and happy family life was key to good childcare.

Weimar was not a large town and there was a desperate shortage of living accommodation for the 423 delegates from across Germany, together with staff support and press reporters, called upon to relocate to Weimar in early 1919. Some delegates ended up taking lodgings in Erfurt or Jena and commuting to Weimar. It is not entirely clear where Marie Zettler lived at this time, but it is thought that she stayed in a shared apartment. When the National Assembly made way for Weimar Germany's first parliament (Reichstag) in June 1920 she did not put herself forward as a candidate in the 1920 general election, preferring to devote herself full-time to church-focused journalism.

Alongside her more directly political work Marie Zettler edited "Bayerisches Frauenland" (loosely, "Bavarian Women's World") between 1919 and 1941. This was a newly established (in 1919) magazine produced by the KDFB. As well as editing the magazine she included her own contributions about her parliamentary and political work. In 1924 she also took on responsibility for the calendar produced annually for the KDFB. Her contributions did not go unappreciated by the Vatican. In December 1928 a letter arrived from Cardinal Dr. Gasparri containing thanks and commendation for the calendar that her partner Maria Buczkowska had sent the Holy Father.

=== Dictatorship 1933–1945 ===
During the Hitler years Marie Zettler is described as "extremely reserved" ("äußerst zurückhaltend") in at least one source. On the other hand, when war broke out six years after the National Socialist take-over, she used the magazine to urge women to make use of the weapons available to them:

- "Weapons of the spirit, soul and heart are women's weapons. They are unconquerable! These are the weapons that women must take up in the present wartime conditions. Their renown will bloom today as in days of old. The obligation of loyalty is the first weapon. The obligations of war are obligations of honour that fall upon women no less than the fall on men. They are hard obligations, to see husbands and sons ready to make the ultimate sacrifice on the battlefield, that can be borne with courage only by raising our eyes to God, without whose will nothing can happen. He mysteriously prepares the path for each of us, whether in war or in peace." (Note: "Waffen des Geistes, der Seele, des Herzens sind Frauenwaffen. Sie sind unbesiegbar! Nach ihnen muß die Frau in der heutigen Kriegszeit greifen. Da wird ihr Ruhm, wie in alter Zeit, auch heute erblühen. Pflichttreue ist die erste Waffe. Kriegspflichten sind Ehrenpflichten für den Mann, nicht minder für die Frau, daß sie opferbereit Mann und Sohn ins Feld zeihen sieht, ist harte Pflicht, die sie mutigen Herzens nur tragen kann, wenn sie aufblickt zu Gott, ohne dessen Willen nichts geschieht. Der geheimnisvoll jedem den Weg zu sich bereitet, ob in Krieg oder Frieden.")

The National Socialists took a close interest in anyone who had been a member of the national parliament during the "Weimar" years: both as a former member of the Weimar National Assembly and on account of her expressly Catholic Christian work, Zettler was kept under surveillance by the authorities. Marie Buczkowska wrote a biography in which she recalled that her partner's mail was monitored and that they were subjected to house searches. Zettler was often called in to the Gestapo main office in Munich to discuss articles in "Bayerisches Frauenland". In a biographical contribution published in 2004 Johann Weber contextualised Buczkowska's reports for a new generation:

"You can look as much as you want, but the National Socialists did not have much against her. So there is not conclusive evidence of reprisals such as apartment searches or monitoring of mail. An interrogation session at the Gestapo main office in the Wittelsbach Palace does seem likely, however." (Note: "Man konnte also suchen wie man wollte, die Nationalsozialisten hatten nicht viel gegen sie in der Hand. Es gibt deshalb keinen einzigen beweiskräftigen Anhaltspunkt für Repressalien, wie Wohnungsdurchsuchung oder Postüberwachung. Ein Verhör in der Gestapo-Zentrale im Wittelsbacher Palais erscheint jedoch als wahrscheinlich.")

In June 1941 production of the "Bayerisches Frauenland" came to an end, on the flimsy reasoning that "people and raw materials needed to be freed up for important war objectives". Marie Zettler provided readers with the following message of valediction:

- "This edition of "Bayerisches Frauenland" comes to you with a heartfelt 'farewell' to all our dear readers. The paper supplies section of the Reich Press Chamber has informed us that the war economy demands fullest concentration of resources. Circumstances have come together that make it necessary for our magazine to be withdrawn from now until further notice so that people and raw materials can be freed up for important war objectives." (Note: "Mit dieser Nummer des 'Bayer. Frauenlandes' geht ein vorläufiger herzlicher Abschiedsgruß an alle lieben Leserinnen. Die Papierwirtschaftsstelle der Reichspressekammer teilte uns mit, daß die Krigeswirtschaft stärkste Konzentration aller Kräfte erfordere. Diese Zusammenfassung macht es notwendig, daß unsere Zeitschrift mit dem heutigen Tag bis auf weiteres ihr Erscheinen einstellt, um Menschen und Material für kriegswichtige Zwecke frei zu machen.")

In December 1944 Marie Zettler and her partner Marie Buczkowska, together with the latter's sister Valentine, relocated back to Mering after their Munich apartment was bombed out.

=== After the war 1945–1950 ===
Following the collapse of Hitler's Germany Bavaria found itself administered, till May 1949, as part of the American zone of occupation: Zettler made a start on rebuilding the KDFB. In January 1949 a KDFB magazine appeared in the form of a supplement to the publication "Katholische Frau", and Zettler once again took charge of the supplement's editorial operation. It might have been the start of a more substantial project, but Marie Zettler's failing health left her unable to participate in the publication's further developments. She was suffering from an acute form of Rheumatism, identified in sources as "Gelenkrheumatismus" and died shortly afterwards at Mering, which is where her body was buried. Helene Weber paid tribute to her as "the [very] soul of the Catholic Women's Movement in Bavaria". (Note: ...die "Seele der katholischen Frauenbewegung in Bayern".)
