= Maria Schmitz =

German teacher

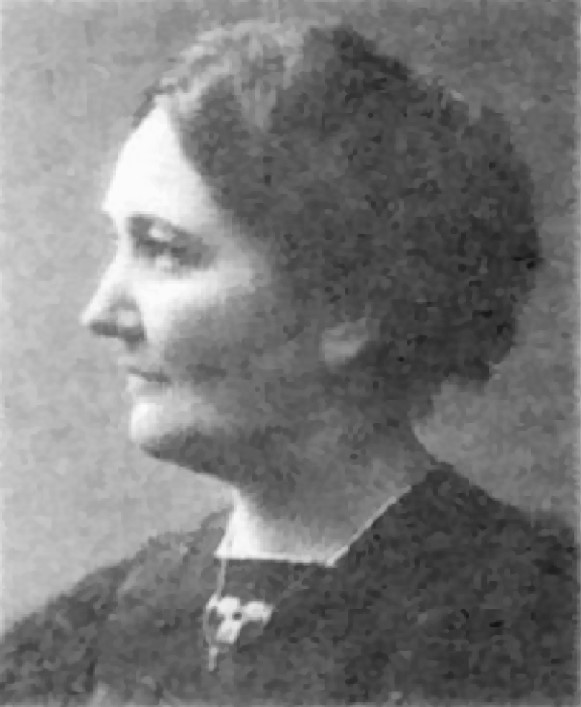
- Maria Schmitz
- Born: 5 February 1875; Aachen, Rhine Province, Prussia, Germany
- Died: 7 July 1962 (aged 87); Essen, North Rhine-Westphalia, West Germany
- Education: University of Münster
- Occupations: Teacher; Pioneer of Catholic Women's Education; Politician
- Parent(s): Carl Hubert Matthias Schmitz (1842–1921); Pauline Bohlen (1848–1917)

Maria Schmitz (5 February 1875 – 9 July 1962) was a German teacher, a persistent campaigner for women's education, and a politician of the Catholic Centre Party. She served as a member of the Weimar National Assembly ("pre-parliament"), convened to agree a post-imperial German constitution, during 1919/1920.

== Biography ==
Maria Schmitz was born into a Catholic family in Aachen. Carl Hubert Matthias Schmitz (1842–1921), her father, was an architect and an Aachen city councillor. Her mother, born Pauline Bohlen (1848–1917), was the eldest of four siblings, of whom two had become nuns. As a small girl she was privately educated at home. Then she attended an all-girls' secondary school, also finding time to study abroad in order to improve her foreign languages. Girls' schools did not prepare pupils for university admission at this time, but she did successfully complete a first level course at a teacher's training academy, so that by the time she was seventeen she was employed as a teacher at the "Höheren Mädchenschule Caspari" (girls' secondary school) in Trier, where she remained till 1900. It was also in 1892 that she joined the Union of German Catholic women teachers ("Verein katholischer deutscher Lehrerinnen" / VkdL). By this time she had also, as a teenager, spent a "youth year" as a member of a Franciscan convent.

Between 1900 and 1902 she attended the "Senior Women Teacher's Course" ("Oberlehrerinnenkurse") provided by the University of Münster. The focus of her studies was on the teaching of History, German, Philosophy and Theology. Although this two-year course was not a standard "university degree course", her participation in it supports the assertion appearing in at least one source that Maria Schmitz was one of the first women in German who was able to study at a university. In 1903 she was offered and rejected a post as a private tutor to the daughter of Archduchess Marie Valerie of Austria, thereby turning down the opportunity to educate a granddaughter of the Emperor of Austria. Instead she took a senior teaching post at the Ursuline School in her native Aachen. Quite soon she moved on to St Leonards, another all-girls' secondary school in Aachen. She was also actively engaged in teacher training. during this period.

From the start of the century Maria Schmitz placed herself in the front-line of the struggle for access to a comprehensive range of properly designed and respected study options for women. However, unlike many of the more high-profile women's rights activists of the time, her objective was not that girls' education should as far as possible be the same as boys' education. Schmitz's vision was for education provision appropriate to what were then seen as a conventional female lifestyles, appropriate in terms both of professional and family duties. This approach, which was clearly at the heart of her own pedagogical activism, was in many ways not too far removed from the distilled wisdom, on the subject of education, to be found in many of the more progressive parts of the church.

Schmitz was actively involved with the Catholic Women's Movement, alongside Hedwig Dransfeld (1871–1925). On 17 May 1907 she founded the Hildegardis-Verein, recognised today as Germany's oldest organisation dedicated to promoting women's education. She was a member of its executive board between 1907 and 1962, and its chair or deputy chair between 1907 and 1921.

In 1908 Schmitz became a deputy chair of the VkdL. She moved to Berlin in order to work full-time for the association in 1912. In 1916 she took over the chairmanship from Pauline Herber (1852-1921). She remained in position till 1953, apart from an enforced hiatus under the Hitler government between 1937 and 1945, during which the VkdL was suppressed. After 1953 she stayed on as an honorary chairwoman. Between 1912 and 1922 Schmitz also served as content controller ("Schriftleiterin") of the VkdL journal, "Kath. Frauenbildung" (loosely, "Catholic women's education"). She also engaged actively with various other Catholic organisations.

Military defeat in 1918 was followed by a period of political and social upheaval sometimes accompanied by violence. Schmitz was elected as a Catholic Centre Party member to the Weimar National Assembly, convened to agree a post-imperial German constitution. She was one of only 36 women elected to the 421 seat assembly. With others, she campaigned strongly in favour of full voting rights for women. She was also a member of the National Conference on Schools in June 1920. Schmitz worked collaboratively (for the most part) with other (female) parliamentarians, such as Agnes Neuhaus, Christine Teusch, Helene Weber and Marie Zettler on the schools legislation.

It was on the initiative of Maria Schmitz that the "Deutsches Institut für wissenschaftliche Pädagogik" ("Catholic Teaching Institute") was set up at Münster. Ten years later she was instrumental in securing a teaching position at the institute for the remarkable Edith Stein.

In the first part of 1945 Maria Schmitz joined the millions fleeing Berlin towards the west. She ended up in Recklinghausen (north of Essen and Dortmund) where she reorganised what briefly became a new (West) German national headquarters for the VkdL. (The 1937 ban had been lifted following the collapse of the Hitler régime.) Still under her chairmanship, the VkdL moved its national head office again, to a more permanent location in Essen, in 1949. Under Schmitz the VkdL developed from being an advocacy body to becoming an educational institution in its own right, creating programmes for training, education and schools policy. A particular priority for Schmitz involved the establishment of pedagogic academies as places for teacher training and, more specifically, backing the academic education of women.

The consistency and wisdom with which Maria Schmitz backed the preservation of Christian values in education earned her great respect from pupils and colleagues alike. However, her continuing advocacy of "celibacy" for women teachers, even if it met with the approval of the church establishment, was already beginning to look rather out of date by the end of the 1950s. (For an earlier generation, across and beyond Catholic Europe, it would have been completely normal for women teachers to abandon teaching and concentrate on their duties as wives and mothers in the event of marriage.)

== Honours and awards ==
- 1925 Pro Ecclesia et Pontifice
- 1955 Order of Merit of the Federal Republic of Germany

== See also ==
- Albertine Badenberg
