= German National Assembly =

German National Assembly (German: Nationalversammlung) may refer to:

- Frankfurt Parliament during the German revolutions of 1848–49
- Weimar National Assembly after the German Revolution of 1918–19 at the end of World War I
