= Alfred Herrmann =

Weimar National Assembly
- In office 1919–1920

Personal details
- Born: 26 December 1879 Inowrazlaw, Province of Posen, German Empire (Inowrocław, Poland)
- Died: 19 January 1960 (aged 80) Berlin
- Party: German Democratic Party
- Spouse: Anna Dorothea Fernis
- Children: 1 daughter, 1 son
- Occupation: historian, journalist

Alfred Herrmann (26 December 1879 – 19 November 1960) was a German historian, journalist and politician.

== Biography ==
Hermann was born in Inowrazlaw (Inowrocław) to Otto Herrmann, a post officer, and Helene née Gartner. He studied history, German studies and philosophy at the University of Breslau (Wrocław), and the Ludwig-Maximilians-Universität München. During his studies, he became a member of the KDStV Winfridia Breslau in the CV in 1899.

After graduating at the University of Breslau in 1903, Herrmann then started to work for Hermann Hüffer in Bonn and became the editor of "Annalen des Historischen Vereins für den Niederrhein" in 1905. He habilitated in 1906 and worked at the University of Bonn until 1913, focusing on Napoleonic, Prussian and Rhenish history.

In autumn 1913, Herrmann became a professor for history at the Royal Academy Posen (Poznań), where he also worked as the head of the press department of the Fifth Army Corps from October 1914 to December 1918. After the end of World War I, he became the chairman of the German people's council Posen (Deutscher Volksrat Posen) and lost his position at the Royal Academy after its dissolution.

In 1919, Herrmann was elected as a member of the Weimar National Assembly representing the German Democratic Party. From 1920 to 1924, Herrmann was the editor of the Oldenburger Landeszeitung and Kieler Zeitung and from 1926 to 1932 deputy editor of the Hamburger Fremdenblatt.

From 1924 to 1925, he lectured on journalism and history of warfare at Kiel University and from 1926 to 1932 and again from 1947 to 1949 as honorary professor at the University of Hamburg on modern German history, journalism and politics. From 1933 to 1935, he worked as executive director of the German press association (Reichsverband der deutschen Presse) and from 1935 to 1944 as managing director of publishing houses in Dresden and Berlin. In 1949, he became tenured professor for modern history and politics at Technische Universität Berlin, he retired in 1954.

Herrmann was a founding member and (from 1951 to 1956) chairman of the commission for the history of parliamentarism and the political parties (Kommission für Geschichte des Parlamentarismus und der politischen Parteien) in Bonn.

In 1955, he was awarded the Grand Cross of Merit of the Federal Republic of Germany.

Herrmann was married to Anna Dorothea Fernis, they had one daughter and one son. He died in Berlin.
