= Hermann Schulz =

Hermann Schulz may refer to:

- Hermann Schulz (figure skater)
- Hermann Schulz (politician)
