= Lore Agnes =

German politician (1876–1953)

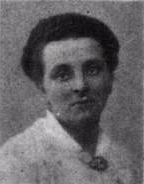
- Agnes in 1919

Member of the Reichstag
- In office 6 February 1919 – 5 March 1933
- Preceded by: Constituency established
- Succeeded by: Constituency abolished
- Constituency: Düsseldorf East

Personal details
- Born: 4 June 1876 Bochum, Prussia, German Empire (now in North Rhine-Westphalia, Germany)
- Died: 9 June 1953 (aged 77) Cologne, North Rhine-Westphalia, West Germany
- Party: Social Democratic Party of Germany
- Other political affiliations: Independent Social Democratic Party of Germany

Lore Agnes (4 June 1876 – 9 June 1953) was a German politician. A house-wife from Düsseldorf, Agnes was a leading figure in the Social Democratic Party of Germany (SPD) and the socialist women's movement in the city. She was a member of parliament 1919-1933.

== Biography ==
Agnes was the daughter of a coal miner from Bochum. She moved to Düsseldorf in 1906. As a socialist women's activist, she founded a Domestic Workers' Association.

At the 1913 Jena congress of the SPD, Agnes belonged to the radical anti-militarist grouping, and supported Rosa Luxemburg's call for general strike action. After the SPD split, Agnes became a leading personality in the Independent Social Democratic Party of Germany (USPD). She was jailed in 1914, after having given an anti-war speech at an International Women's Day meeting. In her speech she had called on the women of Germany to organize resistance against the war.

At the time of the outbreak of the November Revolution, Agnes and other left leaders from Düsseldorf were jailed. Agnes belonged to the group that was freed as revolutionaries stormed the prison, and she immediately became a leading organizer of the revolution in Düsseldorf. She was put in charge of issues relating to food, health and welfare on behalf of the Düsseldorf council.

Agnes was elected to the Weimar National Assembly in the 1919 election as a candidate of the USPD from the Electoral District no. 22 (Düsseldorf-East). The USPD had won 18.7% of the votes in that electoral district, in which Agnes had headed the list of the party.

When the USPD split, Agnes sided with the rightwing tendency, that rejoined the SPD. As a SPD Reichstag member, Agnes represented a moderate leftist standpoint within the party. She was a member of the Reichstag presidium from 1922 onwards. She was also a member of the Düsseldorf municipal council until 1928.

At the age of 68, Agnes was arrested by the Gestapo.

In 1945, she again became a member of the Düsseldorf municipal council. She remained a member of the Women's Commission of SPD until her death.
