= Gertrud Lodahl =

Member of the National Assembly
- In office 1919–1920
- Constituency: Posen

Personal details
- Born: 28 January 1878 Berlin, Germany
- Died: 17 March 1930 (aged 52)

Gertrud Lodahl (28 January 1878 – 17 March 1930) was a German newspaper and magazine editor and politician. In 1919 she became a member of the Weimar National Assembly, remaining a member of parliament until the following year.

== Biography ==
Lodahl was born into a working-class family in Berlin in 1878. After leaving school she worked as a nanny and then in the book printing industry. She joined a trade union and the Social Democratic Party (SPD) around 1895. In 1895 she also became a member of the board of directors of the Berlin Book Printing Association and subsequently edited newspapers and magazines for the SPD, trade unions and cooperatives. During World War I she sat on the advisory board of the War Food Office and was involved with the Price Inspection Office.

Although she was not elected to the Weimar National Assembly in the January 1919 elections, she entered the Assembly in February 1919 as a replacement for Paul Stössel and remained a member until the 1920 Reichstag elections. She died in 1930.
