= Katharina Kloss =

German politician (1867–1945)

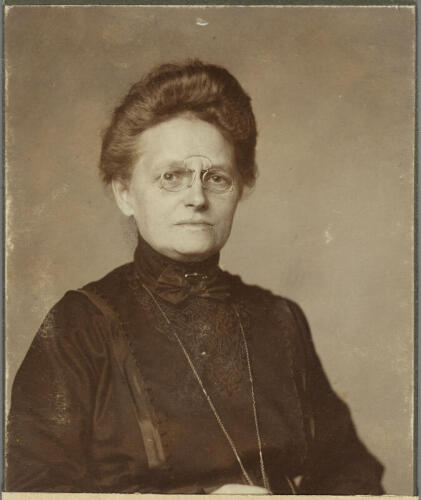

Member of the Weimar National Assembly
- In office 1919–1920
- Constituency: West Prussia

Personal details
- Born: 21 November 1867; Danzig, Prussia
- Died: 2 May 1945 (aged 76); Gdańsk

Katharina Kloss (21 November 1867 – 2 May 1945) was a German teacher and politician. In 1919 she was one of the 36 women elected to the Weimar National Assembly, the first female parliamentarians in Germany. She remained a member of parliament until the following year.

== Biography ==
Kloss was born in Danzig in 1867, the fourth child of merchant and city councillor Robert Kloss and Elisabeth Hoffmann, who was from Königswalde. She attended a teacher training college in Danzig, passing her examinations in 1887. From 1888 she taught at the Elisabethschule, a middle school for girls. In 1894 she became a member of the board of the Danzig Teacher's Association, and in 1898 became headmistress of the Elisabethschule.

Following World War I she joined the German People's Council in Danzig, which was separated from Germany as the Free City of Danzig. Also a member of the German Democratic Party, she was elected to the Weimar National Assembly from the West Prussia constituency. She lost her seat in the 1920 Reichstag elections and died in Danzig in 1945, just over a month after it had been captured by the Red Army.
