= Minna Schilling =

German politician (1877–1943)

Member of the Reichstag
- In office June 1920 – May 1924
- Constituency: Chemnitz–Zwickau
- In office December 1924 – May 1928
- Constituency: Leipzig

Member of the Weimar National Assembly
- In office 1919–1920
- Constituency: Sachsen 15–23

Personal details
- Born: 28 May 1877 Freiberg, Germany
- Died: 22 April 1943 (aged 65) Weimar, Germany

Minna Martha Schilling (28 May 1877 – 22 April 1943) was a German politician. In 1919 she was one of the 36 women elected to the Weimar National Assembly, the first female parliamentarians in Germany. With the exception of a seven-month spell in 1924, she remained a member of parliament until 1928.

== Biography ==
Schilling was born Minna Petermann in Freiberg, Saxony, in 1877, the daughter of a cigar maker. After attending primary school from 1883 to 1891, she also trained as a cigar maker. She took the name Schilling during her first marriage. After joining the Social Democratic Party (SPD) she became involved in social work, as well as working for the credit agency of the Döbeln trade union cartel. In 1914 she became a member of the War Support Committee. After the German Revolution of 1918–1919, she became a member of the workers' council and district council of Döbeln. She later served on Döbeln town council.

In 1919 Schilling was elected to the Weimar National Assembly from constituency 30 (Saxony 15-23) as a representative of the SPD. She was re-elected in the 1920 Reichstag elections from constituency 33 (Chemnitz–Zwickau). Although she lost her seat in the May 1924 elections, she successfully contested the Leipzig constituency in the December 1924 elections, remaining a member of parliament until 1928.

Her first marriage having ended in divorce, in 1928 she married SPD politician August Frölich in 1928, taking the name Frölich. She died in Weimar in 1943.
