= Ernestine Lutze =

German trade unionist and politician

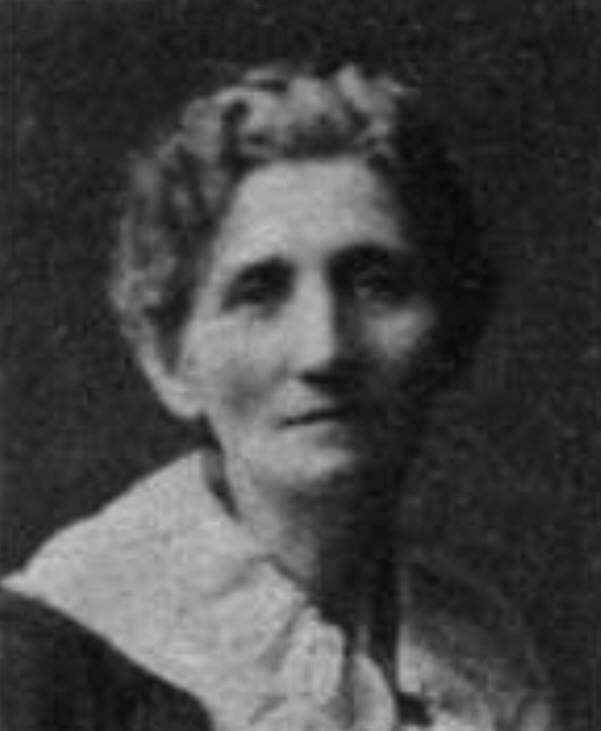

Member of the Weimar National Assembly
- In office 1919–1920
- Constituency: Saxony I

Personal details
- Born: 17 June 1873 Merzdorf, Germany
- Died: 27 April 1948 (aged 74) Dresden, Germany

Ernestine Lutze (17 June 1873 – 27 April 1948) was a German trade unionist and politician. In 1919 she was one of the 36 women elected to the Weimar National Assembly, the first female parliamentarians in Germany. She remained a member of parliament until the following year.

== Biography ==
Lutze was born Ernestine Elsterwerda in Merzdorf in 1873. She attended primary school in Dresden and Großenhain, and began working as a maid aged nine. She later became a florist and a board member of the Flower Worker's Association and married painter Karl Otto Lutze. In 1911 she attended trade union school in Berlin. Back in Dresden, she became a committee member of the regional health insurance fund and in 1917 was appointed to Dresden City Council's housing committee. After the outbreak of the German Revolution in 1918, she became a member of the city's Workers' and Soldiers' Council.

Having been a speaker for the Social Democratic Party (SPD) for several years, in January 1919 she was elected to the Weimar National Assembly from the Saxony I constituency as a representative of the SPD. She lost her seat in the 1920 Reichstag elections. In 1926 she joined the new Old Social Democratic Party, becoming a member of the executive committee of the party's East Saxony branch. Between 1926 and 1929 she served as a city councillor in Dresden.

She died in Dresden in 1948.
