= Elisabeth Brönner =

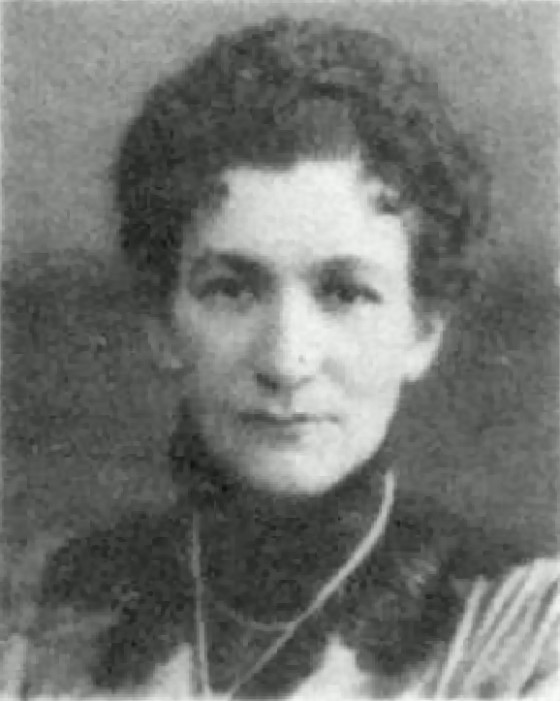

Member of the Reichstag
- In office 1920–1921

Member of the Weimar National Assembly
- In office 1919–1920

Personal details
- Born: 19 February 1880; Schuppinnen, Germany
- Died: 2 February 1950 (aged 69); Babelsberg, East Germany

Elisabeth Brönner (19 February 1880 – 2 February 1950) was a German teacher, newspaper editor and politician. In 1919 she was one of the 36 women elected to the Weimar National Assembly, the first female parliamentarians in Germany. She remained a member of parliament until the following year.

== Biography ==
Brönner was born Elisabeth Höpfner in Schuppinnen (now in Nemansky District) in East Prussia in 1880. She attended primary school in Schmalleningken and high school in Tilsit, leaving school in 1896. She subsequently attended a local teaching seminary, graduating in 1899, after which she taught in Wilhelmshaven, Schulitz, Obornik and Berlin. She also attended the University of Berlin during school holidays. In 1904 she married Wilhelm Brönner.

Between 1904 and 1906 she edited Frauenreich, a newspaper aimed at Berlin housewives. In 1912 she became editor of the Korrespondenz Frauenreich in Königsberg, and between 1915 and 1919 she edited Hartungschen Zeitung. She also wrote short stories and novels.

After World War I she moved to Babelsberg. Having been a member of the Progressive Electoral Association in Königsberg, she became a founder member of the German Democratic Party in 1918. She was elected to the Weimar National Assembly the following year, becoming one of the first group of female parliamentarians in Germany. She was re-elected in 1920, but left the Reichstag after additional members were elected from East Prussia the following year.

After leaving politics, Brönner and her husband moved to Nowawes, a suburb of Potsdam, where they purchased the Nowaweser Zeitung printing company. They established Memelland-Verlag in 1924 and the Das Memelland magazine. She died in Potsdam in 1950.
