= Weimar National Assembly =

1919–20 German constitutional convention and parliament

German National Assembly Deutsche Nationalversammlung
- Constituent assembly of Germany

Type
- Type: Constituent assembly

History
- Established: 6 February 1919
- Disbanded: 21 May 1920
- Preceded by: Imperial Reichstag
- Succeeded by: Weimar Reichstag
- Seats: 423 (at dissolution)

Elections
- Voting system: Party-list proportional representation
- Last election: 19 January 1919

Meeting place
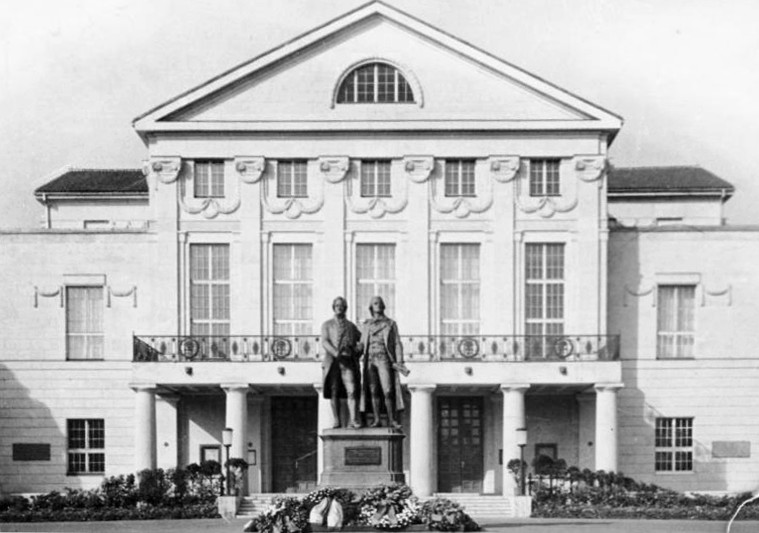
- Deutsches Nationaltheater, Weimar

The Weimar National Assembly (German: Weimarer Nationalversammlung), officially the German National Constitutional Assembly (Verfassunggebende Deutsche Nationalversammlung), was the popularly elected constitutional convention and de facto parliament of Germany from 6 February 1919 to 21 May 1920. As part of its duties as the interim government, it debated and reluctantly approved the Treaty of Versailles that codified the peace terms between Germany and the victorious Allies of World War I. The Assembly drew up and approved the Weimar Constitution that was in force from 1919 to 1933 (and technically until the end of Nazi rule in 1945). With its work completed, the National Assembly was dissolved on 21 May 1920. Following the election of 6 June 1920, the new Reichstag met for the first time on 24 June 1920, taking the place of the Assembly.

Because the National Assembly convened in Weimar rather than in politically restive Berlin, the period in German history became known as the Weimar Republic.

== Background ==
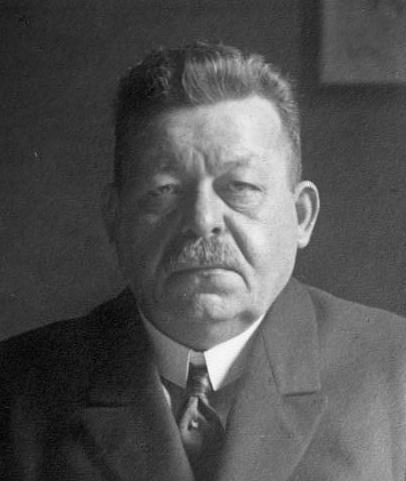
Friedrich Ebert

At the end of World War I, following the outbreak of the German Revolution of 1918–1919, state power lay with the Council of the People's Deputies. It was formed on 10 November by revolutionary workers' and soldiers' councils in Berlin and headed by Friedrich Ebert of the Social Democratic Party (SPD). He had been appointed German chancellor on 9 November by Maximilian von Baden, the last chancellor under the German Empire. Both von Baden and the Social Democrats called for the speedy election of a National Assembly to establish a new government for Germany. The Council decided on 30 November to hold the election on 19 January 1919. On 19 December the Reich Congress of Workers' and Soldiers' Councils also approved the decree by a clear majority.

Because of the Spartacist uprising, a general strike and the accompanying armed struggles that roiled the Reich capital from 5 to 12 January 1919, it was agreed that the National Assembly should not initially meet in Berlin. Four possible locations – Bayreuth, Nuremberg, Jena and Weimar – were considered. Friedrich Ebert favored Weimar because he wanted the victorious Allies to be reminded of Weimar Classicism, which included the writers Goethe and Schiller, while they were deliberating the terms of the peace treaty. On 14 January 1919 the choice fell to Weimar.

== Elections ==
The elections for the National Assembly were the first held in Germany after the introduction of women's suffrage and the lowering of the legal voting age from 25 to 20 years. Together the changes raised the number of eligible voters by around 20 million. The turnout was 83%, a slightly lower percentage than in the last Reichstag elections in 1912, but a much greater absolute turnout due to the expanded suffrage. Among women the turnout was 90%. The Communist Party of Germany (KPD), founded in December 1918, boycotted the elections.

The election for the National Assembly resulted in the SPD receiving the most votes at 38%, followed by the Catholic Centre Party (which in this election ran as the Christian People's Party) with 20%, the liberal German Democratic Party (DDP) 19%, the national-conservative German National People's Party (DNVP) 10% and the more leftist and antiwar breakaway from the SPD, the Independent Social Democratic Party (USPD), 8%. Numerous small parties made up the remainder. Out of a total of 416 delegates 36 were women, although this increased to 41 during the term of the Assembly. If the latter number is taken, at 10% women, the Weimar National Assembly was one of the most female parliaments of its time.

Results of election to the National Assembly by district

On 10 February the Assembly passed the "Law on Provisional Reich Power" (Gesetz über die vorläufige Reichsgewalt) to go into effect the following day. It regulated the government's powers during the transitional phase from the German Empire to the Weimar Republic. The National Assembly was to adopt a constitution and "urgently needed" Reich laws, thus allowing it to act as an interim parliament. A States' Committee served in the place of the later Reichsrat to represent the interests of the German states. The "business of the Reich" was to be conducted by a Reich president. His function was somewhat like that of the former emperor but with the restrictions that had been made to the constitution in October 1918, notably that war and peace were to be decided by Reich law, not by the head of state. The ministers appointed by the Reich president required the confidence of the National Assembly.

== Assembly as provisional parliament ==
The National Assembly convened at the German National Theater in Weimar on 6 February 1919. It elected the SPD politician Eduard David as its president, but because of an inter-party agreement he stepped down after just four days. On 14 February 1919 the National Assembly elected Constantin Fehrenbach, a Centre Party deputy and former vice president, as his successor.

On 11 February the National Assembly elected the previous head of government, Friedrich Ebert (SPD), as provisional Reich president. He asked Philipp Scheidemann of the SPD to form a government. The three party coalition of the SPD, the Centre Party and the DDP that he brought together in the Scheidemann cabinet came to be known as the Weimar Coalition.

== Discussion of the Treaty of Versailles ==
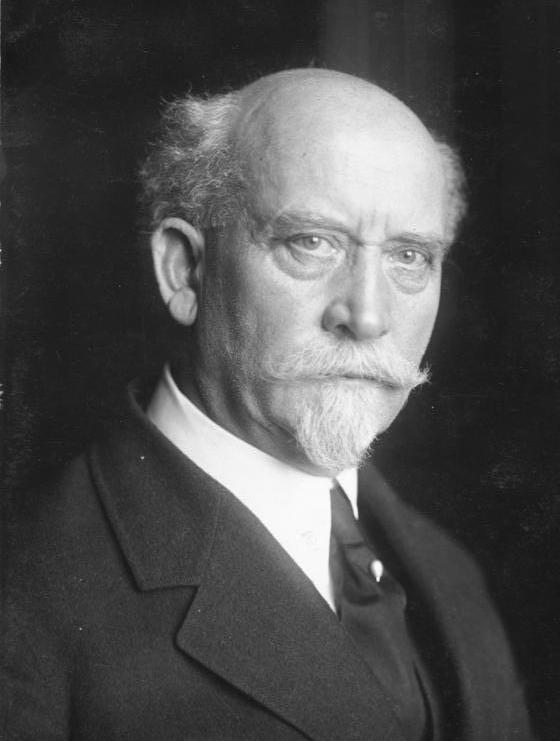
Philipp Scheidemann

On 12 May 1919 the National Assembly met in Berlin for the first time. There it heard and then debated a statement by Minister President Philipp Scheidemann on the peace terms of the Versailles Treaty. In his speech Scheidemann, to great applause from all parties, called the Entente Powers' terms a "dictated" or "enforced" peace (Gewaltfrieden) intended to strangle the German people. The territorial, economic and political demands would deprive Germany of the air to breathe. The conditions were unacceptable, he said, and were in stark contrast to the assurances given by U.S. President Woodrow Wilson. The Reich government could not agree to the conditions and would make counterproposals based on Wilson's 14-point program. Prussian Minister President Paul Hirsch assured the Reich government of full support on behalf of the constituent states of the German Reich and also sharply criticized the Entente's conditions. Speakers from all parties, from the USPD to the DNVP, also declared the Entente's demands unacceptable. The chairman of the liberal German People's Party (DVP) and later Reich Foreign Minister Gustav Stresemann described the peace terms of the victorious powers as "an outpouring of political sadism". Only Hugo Haase, chairman of the USPD, combined his rejection of the Entente's demands with sharp attacks on the Reich government, accusing it of having caused the current situation in the first place through its policy of enforcing a truce between political parties (Burgfriedenspolitik) during the war.

Following the Entente's rejection of its counterproposals, the Scheidemann cabinet resigned on 20 June 1919 because it was unwilling to give its assent to the Treaty of Versailles. The new Minister President, Gustav Bauer (SPD), who headed a government of the SPD and the Centre, promoted the signing of the treaty but continued to criticize individual provisions, especially those concerning the extradition of Germans to the Entente and the imposition of war guilt on Germany alone. He combined his call for approval with the comment that it would be impossible for the German Reich to fulfill all the economic conditions of the treaty and regretted that it had not been possible to extract further concessions from the Entente.

=== Initial vote in favor ===
Speakers from the SPD and the Centre, Paul Löbe and Adolf Gröber, also condemned the treaty. They objected in particular to the statement in the Entente draft treaty that Germany was solely to blame for the war. On behalf of their parliamentary groups, however, they spoke in favor of acceptance, since the only alternative was the resumption of hostilities, which would lead to even worse consequences. Eugen Schiffer, the former Reich Finance Minister, spoke on behalf of the majority of German Democratic Party deputies against accepting the treaty. He reminded the two governing parties of Philipp Scheidemann's 12 May warning that the hand that signed the treaty would wither. He did not see that the situation had changed since then. The DNVP and DVP were also strongly opposed to the treaty. The USPD was the only opposition party to endorse its acceptance. Hugo Haase called the issue at stake a terrible dilemma for the National Assembly. Although he too sharply criticized the treaty, he pointed out, as had the representatives of the governing parties, the consequences if the treaty were rejected.

In a 22 June roll call, 237 deputies voted in favor of signing the peace treaty, 138 against, and five abstained. Of the major parties, the SPD, Centre and USPD approved, while the DDP, DNVP and DVP rejected the treaty, on both sides by large majorities of the delegates.

The Reich government informed the Entente the same day that it would sign the treaty but with reservations as to the provisions on war guilt and the extradition of Germans to the victorious countries. French Prime Minister Georges Clemenceau replied that evening on behalf of the Allied Powers that the treaty could only be accepted or rejected in its entirety.

=== Second vote following allied ultimatum ===
At the meeting of the National Assembly on 23 June, Minister President Bauer informed the plenum of the Entente's position and stated that the government no longer had a choice; it had to sign the treaty:

Let us sign, that is the proposal I have to make to you on behalf of the entire cabinet. The reasons that compel us to make the proposal are the same as yesterday, only now we are separated by a period of barely four hours before the resumption of hostilities. We could not justify a new war even if we had weapons. We are defenseless, but without defense does not mean without honor (wehrlos ist aber nicht ehrlos). Certainly, our enemies want to take away our honor, there is no doubt about that, but that this attempt at cutting away our honor will one day fall back on the originators, that it is not our honor that will perish in this world tragedy, that is my belief until my last breath.

Eugen Schiffer (DDP) and Rudolf Heinze (DVP), whose parties had rejected the treaty the day before, explicitly stated in their speeches that the supporters of the treaty would act exclusively out of "patriotic sentiment and conviction" (Schiffer), even if they had different opinions about the right path forward. The DNVP speaker Georg Schultz, however, did not make his opinion on the issue clear.

Ratification of the treaty through the "Law on the Conclusion of Peace between Germany and the Allied and Associated Powers" (Gesetz über den Friedensschluß zwischen Deutschland und den alliierten und den assoziierten Mächten) finally took place on 9 July 1919 with results similar to the 22 June vote. The only exception was that the majority of the deputies of the Bavarian Peasants' League, who had abstained from the first vote, now approved the ratification law.

In part as a response to the treaty, and particularly Article 231 that assigned sole responsibility for the war to Germany, the Assembly established an inquiry into guilt for the war on 20 August 1919. Its four subcommittees were tasked with examining the causes of the war, what brought about its loss, what missed opportunities for peace had presented themselves, and if international laws had been broken. The inquiry continued for thirteen years, until the Nazi Party victory in the election of July 1932. The inquiry's findings were hampered by lack of cooperation from both the government and the military and were in general watered down and deflected blame away from Germany.

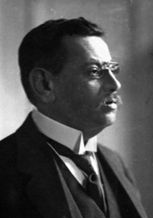
Hugo Preuß

== Constitutional deliberations ==
On 15 November 1918 Friedrich Ebert had appointed Hugo Preuß to the Reich Office of the Interior and charged him with drafting a Reich constitution. Preuß, a teacher of constitutional law and one of the founders of the German Democratic Party, based his draft of the Weimar Constitution in large part on the Frankfurt Constitution of 1849 which was written after the German revolutions of 1848–1849 and intended for a unified Germany that did not come to pass at the time. He was influenced as well by Robert Redslob's theory of parliamentarianism, which called for a balance between the executive and legislative branches under either a monarch or the people as sovereign. After the National Assembly was seated, Preuß became a member of the constitutional committee, which was chaired by the Assembly's vice president, Conrad Haußmann of the DDP. Preuß later became known as the father of the Weimar Constitution.

During July of 1919, the Assembly moved quickly through the draft constitution with most debates concluded within a single session. On 31 July the Assembly passed the revised committee proposal for the constitution by a vote of 262 to 75, with USPD, DNVP and DVP against.

Key topics of debate were as follows:

Date	Topic	Decision
2 July	National name	'Deutsches Reich'
	National structure	Retain federal states
	Flag and colors	Black-red-gold
4 July	Reich president	Adopted a semi-presidential system with power divided between president, cabinet and parliament. The president was to rule in conjunction with the Reichstag. Emergency powers to be used only in exceptional circumstances.
7 July	Reich administration	Germany unified as an economic territory; legislative responsibility for tax law to be with the Reich. Unified postal and railroad systems
10 July	Justice	Established a system of administrative courts and a high or constitutional court. Restricted military jurisdiction to wartime. Independence of courts incorporated into the constitution.
11 July	Fundamental rights	Constitution to include expanded list of fundamental rights as in draft version.
15 July	Equality of the sexes	Adopted what became Article 109: "(1) All Germans are equal before the law. Men and women shall fundamentally have the same civic rights and duties. (2) Public and legal privileges or disadvantages of birth or status shall be abolished."
16 July	Death penalty	Rejected draft constitution's proposal to abolish the death penalty.
	Censorship	Guaranteed freedom of expression in speech, print, or “pictorially”. Censorship forbidden except in “cinematographs”, “indecent and obscene literature”, and for “protection of youth”.
	Illegitimacy	Illegitimate children to have the same rights as legitimate.
17 July	Right to assemble	Guaranteed right to assemble peaceably without any special permission needed.
	Church and state	Guaranteed freedom of religion and separation of church and state.
18 July	Education	Universal public education ensured to age 18.
21 July	Economic Life	Right to property, patent protection, and unionization guaranteed.

== Miscellaneous ==
On 13 January 1920, while the National Assembly was negotiating the Works Councils Act, which created an obligation for companies with twenty or more employees to have works councils, a demonstration against the law took place in front of the Reichstag building. The left-wing opposition parties USPD and Communist Party, among others, had called for the demonstration because they felt the councils would lack sufficient worker representation. About 100,000 people gathered for the demonstration. Prussian security police fired into the crowd leaving 42 people dead and over 100 wounded. The Reichstag Bloodbath was the deadliest demonstration in German history.

Beginning on 30 September 1919, the National Assembly met in the renovated Reichstag building in Berlin. During the Kapp Putsch it briefly moved to Stuttgart and met there on 18 March 1920.

The National Assembly dissolved on 21 May 1920. After the Reichstag election on 6 June 1920, the Republic's first Reichstag took the place of the National Assembly.

== Summary of important events and decisions ==
- 6 February 1919 – Friedrich Ebert, as chairman of the Council of the People's Deputies, opened the first session of the National Assembly.
- 10 February 1919 – Against the votes of the USPD, the Assembly passed the "Law on Provisional Reich Power" (Gesetz über die vorläufige Reichsgewalt). It designated the Assembly itself as the legislative power and set up the position of Reich president, who was to be in charge of "the Reich's government affairs". A States' Committee was to be created to represent Germany's constituent states.
- 11 February 1919 – Friedrich Ebert was elected provisional Reich president. He asked Philipp Scheidemann to form a government.
- 13 February 1919 –Scheidemann formed a government based on the Weimar Coalition.
- 14 February 1919 – Constantin Fehrenbach (Centre Party) was elected president of the National Assembly.
- 27 February 1919 – The Assembly passed a law setting up a provisional military in accordance with the terms of the Armistice. By 1921 the armed forces were to be transformed into a professional army without conscripts. The number of land troops was to be cut from 800,000 to 100,000.
- 4 March 1919 – The Assembly passed a law clarifying the position of imperial laws and those passed by the Council of the People's Deputies.
- 12 May 1919 – The National Assembly met for a protest rally against the Treaty of Versailles. Philipp Scheidemann called it "unacceptable".
- 20/21 June 1919 – The Scheidemann government resigned. The next day Gustav Bauer (SPD) formed a new government.
- 22 June 1919 – With the approval of the Assembly, the new government declared itself ready to accept the Treaty of Versailles if the admission of Germany's sole responsibility for the war were dropped.
- 3 July 1919 – The Assembly accepted the new national colors.
- 7 July 1919 – Finance minister Matthias Erzberger (Centre Party) presented his fiscal reforms including the introduction of the first German income tax and fiscal burden sharing.
- 9 July 1919 – The Assembly ratified the Treaty of Versailles and the regulatory statutes about the military occupation of the Rhineland.
- 31 July 1919 – The Assembly passed the Weimar Constitution with 262 delegates voting for and 75 (USPD, DNVP and DVP) against.
- 11 August 1919 – Reich President Ebert signed the constitution. It came into force on 14 August 1919. Final meeting of the Assembly in Weimar.
- 30 September 1919 – First meeting of the Assembly at Berlin, after law and order were deemed to have been restored in the capital.
- 17 December 1919 – The Assembly passed a law that called for a one-off wealth tax to pay for the national debt.
- 18 January 1920 – The Assembly passed the law on workers' councils.
- 13 March 1920 – The Assembly left Berlin as a result of the Kapp Putsch. It returned from Stuttgart seven days later.
- 25/26 March 1920 – The government of Chancellor Gustav Bauer resigned. The next day President Ebert asked Hermann Müller (SPD) to form a new government.
- 8 May 1920 – A law came into force establishing a security zone around parliamentary buildings in which demonstrations were not allowed.
- 12 May 1920 – A law that was the basis for movie censorship came into force.
- 20 May 1920 – Supported by the SPD, the majority of the Assembly called on the government to end the state of emergency in all of Germany. The government refused.
- 21 May 1920 – The National Assembly dissolved. After the Reichstag election on 6 June 1920, the Republic's first Reichstag took the place of the National Assembly.

== Presidents of the Weimar National Assembly ==
Name	Party	Entered office	Left office
Eduard David	SPD	7 February 1919	13 February 1919
Conrad Haußmann (acting)		13 February 1919	14 February 1919
Constantin Fehrenbach	Centre	14 February 1919	21 June 1920

== Members ==
Member	Party	Constituency	Notes
Bruno Ablaß	DDP	11 (Liegnitz)	
Karl Aderhold	USPD		Entered on 1 March 1919 as a replacement for August Merges
Lore Agnes	USPD	25 (Düsseldorf-Ost)	
Joseph Allekotte	Centre	21 (Coblenz-Trier)	
Ludwig Alpers	DHP	37 (Bremen-Hamburg-Stade)	
Josef Andre	Centre	31/32 (Württemberg)	
Albert Arnstadt	DNVP	36 (Thuringia)	
Julius Aßmann	DVP	8 (Posen)	
Jacob Astor	Centre	21 (Coblenz-Trier)	
Erhard Auer	SPD	24 (Oberbayern-Schwaben)	
Benedikt Bachmeier	BB		Entered on 24 February 1919 as a replacement for Wilhelm Männer
Paul Bader	SPD	12 (Magdeburg)	
Max Baerecke	DNVP	2 (Westpreußen)	
Moritz Baerwald	DDP	8 (Posen)	Died on 26 December 1919
Gertrud Bäumer	DDP	36 (Thuringia)	
Max Bahr	DDP	6 (Frankfurt (Oder))	
Franz Bartschat	DDP	1 (Ostpreußen)	
August Baudert	SPD	36 (Thuringia)	
Gustav Bauer	SPD	9 (Breslau)	
Marie Baum	DDP	14 (Schleswig-Holstein)	
Eduard Baumer	BVP		Entered on 26 February 1920 as a replacement for Eugen Taucher
Johannes Becker	Centre	20 (Westfalen-Süd)	
Johann Becker	DVP	34 (Hessen-Darmstadt)	
Josef Becker	Centre	19 (Hessen-Nassau)	
Roman Becker	SPD	10 (Oppeln)	
Margarete Behm	DNVP	7 (Pommern)	
Marie Behncke	SPD		Entered on 7 August 1919 as a replacement for August Jordan
Franz Behrens	DNVP	1 (Ostpreußen)	
Hermann Beims	SPD	12 (Magdeburg)	
Johannes Bell	Centre	23 (Düsseldorf-West)	
Ferdinand Bender	SPD	12 (Magdeburg)	
Theodor Bergmann	Centre	23 (Düsseldorf-West)	
Karl Bethke	SPD		Entered on 12 May 1919 as a replacement for Wilhelm Buck
August Beuermann	DVP	8 (Posen)	
Konrad Beyerle	Centre	29 (Franken)	Joined BVP on 6 January 1920
Anton Bias	SPD	10 (Oppeln)	
Franz Biener	DNVP	30 (Chemnitz-Zwickau)	
Albert Billian	SPD		Entered on 13 January 1920 as a replacement for Heinrich Kürbis
Jakob Binder	SPD		
Joseph Bitta	Centre	10 (Oppeln)	
Lorenz Blank	Centre		
Anna Blos	SPD		
Johannes Blum	Centre	26 (Düsseldorf-West)	
Andreas Blunck	DDP	14 (Schleswig-Holstein)	
Wilhelm Bock	USPD	13 (Thuringia)	
Karl Böhme	DDP	11 (Magdeburg)	
Wilhelm Böhmert	DDP		
Friedrich Börschmann	SPD		
Minna Bollmann	SPD		
Eugen Bolz	Centre	34 (Württemberg)	
Otto Brass	USPD	25 (Düsseldorf-Ost)	
Otto Braun	SPD	26 (Düsseldorf-West)	
Adolf Braun	SPD	29 (Franken)	
Heinrich Brauns	Centre	Reichswahlvorschlag	
Otto von Brentano di Tremezzo	Centre	22 (Hessen-Darmstadt)	
August Brey	SPD	18 (Süd-Hannover-Braunschweig)	
Alfred Brodauf	DDP	33 (Chemnitz-Zwickau)	
Elisabeth Brönner	DDP	1 (Ostpreußen)	
Arno Bruchardt	USPD	Reichswahlvorschlag	
Hermann Bruckhoff	DDP		
Paul Brühl	USPD	4 (Potsdam I)	
Friedrich Brühne	SPD		
Wilhelm Bruhn	DNVP	5 (Frankfurt (Oder))	
Wilhelm Buck	SPD	31 (Dresden-Bautzen)	Resigned on 11 April 1919
Ewald Budde	SPD		
Michael Burgau	SPD		
Eduard Burlage	Centre	16 (Weser-Ems)	
Oskar Cohn	USPD		
Hermann Colshorn	DHP	18 (Süd-Hannover-Braunschweig)	Elected on a joint list with the Centre Party
Eduard David	SPD	22 (Hessen-Darmstadt)	
Georg Davidsohn	SPD		
Kurt Deglerk	DNVP	8 (Breslau)	
Karl Deichmann	SPD		
Clemens von Delbrück	DNVP	Reichswahlvorschlag	Died on 18 December 1921
Carl Delius	DDP	12 (Merseburg)	
Bernhard Dernburg	DDP	3 (Potsdam II)	
Hermann Dietrich	DDP	35 (Baden)	Resigned on 12 April 1919
Hermann Dietrich	DNVP	Reichswahlvorschlag	
Karl Dietrich	SPD		
Carl Diez	Centre	35 (Baden)	
Theodor Dirr	BB		
Wilhelm Dittmann	USPD	11 (Magdeburg)	
Alexander Graf zu Dohna-Schlodien	DVP	1 (Ostpreußen)	
Hedwig Dransfeld	Centre	Reichswahlvorschlag	
Ernst Dröner	SPD		
Adelbert Düringer	DNVP	35 (Baden)	
Wilhelm Dusche	DVP	18 (Süd-Hannover-Braunschweig)	
Bernhard Düwell	USPD	12 (Merseburg)	
Friedrich Ebert	SPD		Resigned on 11 February 1919
Hermann Eger	Centre		Entered on 19 November 1919 as a replacement for Adolf Gröber
Franz Ehrhardt	Centre	10 (Oppeln)	
Emil Eichhorn	USPD	2 (Berlin)	
Wilhelmine Eichler	SPD	13 (Thuringia)	
Georg Eisenberger	BB	27 (Oberbayern-Schwaben)	
Elise Ekke	DDP		
Paul Ende	DDP		Entered on 22 June 1919 as a replacement for Oscar Günther
Fritz Endres	SPD		
Emil Engelhard	DDP		Resigned on 3 October 1919
Anton Erkelenz	DDP	25 (Düsseldorf-Ost)	
Eugen Ernst	SPD		
Joseph Ersing	Centre	35 (Baden)	
Matthias Erzberger	Centre	34 (Württemberg)	
Bernhard Falk	DDP		
Wilhelm Farwick	Centre		
Constantin Fehrenbach	Centre	35 (Baden)	
Jan Fegter	DDP		Entered on 20 November 1919 as a replacement for Theodor Tantzen
Franz Feldmann	SPD	8 (Breslau)	
Otto Fischbeck	DDP		
Gustav Fischer	SPD	18 (Süd-Hannover-Braunschweig)	
Richard Fischer	SPD	2 (Berlin)	
Paul Fleischer	Centre	1 (Ostpreußen)	
Wilhelm Frank	Centre		Entered on 9 March 1920 as a replacement for Richard Müller
Richard Franke	DDP		
Wilhelm Frerker	Centre		
Karl Frohme	SPD	14 (Schleswig-Holstein)	
Karl Gandorfer	BB		
Karl Gebhart	DVP	30 (Pfalz)	
Oskar Geck	SPD	35 (Baden)	
Julius Gehl	SPD		
Liborius Gerstenberger	BVP	29 (Franken)	
Curt Geyer	USPD	Reichswahlvorschlag	
Friedrich Geyer	USPD	32 (Leipzig)	
Karl Giebel	SPD	5 (Frankfurt (Oder))	
Anna von Gierke	DNVP		
Johannes Giesberts	Centre	25 (Düsseldorf-Ost)	
Anton Gilsing	Centre		
Emil Girbig	SPD	9 (Liegnitz)	
Wilhelm Gleichauf	DDP		
Heinrich Gölzer	SPD		
Georg Gothein	DDP	8 (Breslau)	
Georg Gradnauer	SPD	Reichswahlvorschlag	Resigned on 10 April 1919
Albrecht von Graefe	DNVP	7 (Mecklenburg)	
Adolf Gröber	Centre		Died on 19 November 1919
Martin Gruber	SPD	27 (Oberbayern-Schwaben)	
Helene Grünberg	USPD		Entered on 21 November 1919 as a replacement for Josef Simon
Wilhelm Grünewald	DDP		
August Grunau	Centre		
Oscar Günther	DDP		Resigned on 1 June 1919
Magnus Haack	SPD		Resigned on 19 August 1919
Ludwig Haas	DDP	35 (Baden)	
Hugo Haase	USPD		Died on 7 November 1919
August Josef Hagemann	Centre	16 (Weser-Ems)	
August Hampe	Brunswick State Electoral Association		
Heinrich Hansmann	SPD	20 (Westfalen-Süd)	
Gustav Hartmann	DDP		
Rudolf Hartmann	DNVP	10 (Oppeln)	
Ludwig Hasenzahl	SPD		
Frieda Hauke	SPD	10 (Oppeln)	
Conrad Haußmann	DDP	34 (Württemberg)	
Benedikt Hebel	BVP		Resigned on 24 February 1920
Werner Heidsieck	DDP		Entered on 17 January 1920 as a replacement for Moritz Baerwald
Wilhelm Heile	DDP	18 (Süd-Hannover-Braunschweig)	
Georg Heim	Centre	28 (Niederbayern-Oberpfalz)	Joined BVP on 9 January 1920
Hugo Heimann	SPD	2 (Berlin)	
Wolfgang Heine	SPD		
Rudolf Heinze	DVP	31 (Dresden-Bautzen)	
August Hellmann	SPD	15 (Hamburg)	
Alfred Henke	USPD	16 (Weser-Ems)	
Konrad Henrich	DDP		
Karl Hense	SPD		
Richard Herbst	USPD		Entered on 20 November 1919 as a replacement for Hugo Haase
Karl Hermann	DDP	34 (Württemberg)	
Carl Herold	Centre	19 (Westfalen-Nord)	
Alfred Herrmann	DDP		
Hans Herschel	Centre	10 (Oppeln)	
Fritz Hesse	DDP		
Michael Hierl	SPD		
Karl Hildenbrand	SPD	34 (Württemberg)	
Franz Hitze	Centre	Reichswahlvorschlag	
Gustav Hoch	SPD	21 (Hessen-Nassau)	
Else Höfs	SPD		
Otto Hörsing	SPD		
Johannes Hoffmann	SPD	30 (Pfalz)	
Arthur Hofmann	SPD	13 (Thuringia)	
Hermann Hofmann	Centre	30 (Pfalz)	
Peter Holl	SPD		
Franz Holzapfel	SPD		Entered on 30 September 1919 as a replacement for Magnus Haack
Otto Hue	SPD	20 (Westfalen-Süd)	
Anna Hübler	USPD		
Paul Hug	SPD		Resigned on 22 May 1919
Alfred Hugenberg	DNVP	19 (Westfalen-Nord)	
Otto Hugo	DVP	19 (Westfalen-Nord)	
Heinrich Imbusch	Centre	20 (Westfalen-Süd)	
Martin Irl	Centre		Joined BVP on 9 January 1920
Heinrich Jäcker	SPD	25 (Düsseldorf-Ost)	
Willy Jandrey	DNVP	6 (Pommern)	
Alfred Janschek	SPD	19 (Westfalen-Nord)	
Viktor Jantzen	SPD		
Heinrich Jasper	SPD		
Josef Jaud	BVP	27 (Oberbayern-Schwaben)	
Philipp Johannsen	SHBLD		Entered on 1 August 1919 as a replacement for Detlef Thomsen
Joseph Joos	Centre	23 (Köln-Aachen)	
August Jordan	SPD		Entered on 22 May 1919 as a replacement for Paul Hug, resigned on 5 July 1919
Marie Juchacz	SPD	4 (Potsdam I)	
Max Jungnickel	SPD		
Ludwig Kaas	Centre	24 (Coblenz-Trier)	
Wilhelm Kahl	DVP	2 (Berlin)	
Wilhelmine Kähler	SPD	1 (Ostpreußen)	
Hermann Käppler	SPD	13 (Thuringia)	
Hermann Kahmann	SPD	31 (Dresden-Bautzen)	
Franz Kaufmann	Centre		
Simon Katzenstein	SPD		
Wilhelm Keil	SPD	34 (Württemberg)	
Adolf Kempkes	DVP	25 (Düsseldorf-Ost)	
Gottlieb Kenngott	SPD		
Andreas Kerschbaum	DDP	29 (Franken)	
Katharina Kloss	DDP		
Friedrich Knollmann	DNVP		Died on 16 April 1920
Christian Koch	DDP		
Johann Koch	Centre	Reichswahlvorschlag	
Wilhelm Koch	DNVP	25 (Düsseldorf-Ost)	
William Karl Koch	DDP		
Erich Koch-Weser	DDP	16 (Weser-Ems)	
Franz Heinrich Költzsch	DNVP		
Wilhelm Koenen	USPD	12 (Merseburg)	
Max König	SPD	20 (Westfalen-Süd)	
Alwin Körsten	SPD	6 (Pommern)	
Bartholomäus Koßmann	Centre		
Theodor Kotzur	SPD	1 (Ostpreußen)	
Hermann Krätzig	SPD	31 (Dresden-Bautzen)	
Heinrich von Kraut	DNVP		
Karl Kreft	DNVP		
Franz Kreutz	Centre		
Wilhelm Kröger	SPD	7 (Mecklenburg)	Entered on 25 July 1919 as a replacement for Franz Starosson
Peter Kronen	SPD		
Franz Krüger	SPD		
Hans Krüger	SPD		
Josef Kubetzko	Centre	10 (Oppeln)	Resigned on 12 July 1919
Wilhelm Külz	DDP		Entered on 20 January 1920 as a replacement for Emil Nitzschke
Heinrich Kürbis	SPD		Resigned on 2 December 1919
Bernhard Kuhnt	USPD	33 (Chemnitz-Zwickau)	
Fritz Kunert	USPD	12 (Merseburg)	
Alexander Kuntze	SPD	6 (Pommern)	
Bruno Kurowski	Centre		
Hedwig Kurt	SPD		Entered on 10 April 1919 as a replacement for Georg Gradnauer
Otto Landsberg	SPD		
Christian Ritter von Langheinrich	DDP		Resigned on 21 April 1919
Heinrich Langwost	DHP	18 (Süd-Hannover-Braunschweig)	Elected on a joint list with the Centre Party
Wilhelm Lattmann	DNVP		Entered on 24 October 1919 as a replacement for Karl Veidt
Gustav Laukant	USPD		
Wilhelm Laverrenz	DNVP	2 (Berlin)	
Peter Legendre	Centre		
Carl Legien	SPD	14 (Schleswig-Holstein)	Died on 26 December 1920
Johann Leicht	Centre	29 (Franken)	Joined BVP in January 1922
Gottfried Leiser	DDP		Entered on 24 October 1919 as a replacement for Emil Engelhard
Felix Lensing	Centre		
Friedrich Lesche	SPD	17 (Ost-Hannover)	
Hans Liebig	SPD		
Julius Lippmann	DDP		
Paul Lockenvitz	DDP		
Paul Löbe	SPD	8 (Breslau)	
Gertrud Lodahl	SPD		Entered on 12 February 1919 as a replacement for Paul Stössel
Heinrich Löffler	SPD	10 (Oppeln)	
Josef Lübbring	SPD	1 (Ostpreußen)	
Marie-Elisabeth Lüders	DDP	Reichswahlvorschlag	Entered on 24 August 1919 as a replacement for Friedrich Naumann
Frida Lührs	SPD		
August Lüttich	SPD		
Friedrich Max Ludewig	DDP		
Hermann Luppe	DDP		
Ernestine Lutze	SPD		
Wilhelm Männer	BB		Resigned in February 1919
Gustav Malkewitz	DNVP	6 (Pommern)	
Oskar Maretzky	DVP	4 (Potsdam I)	
Wilhelm Marx	Centre	25 (Düsseldorf-Ost)	
Georg Mauerer	SPD		Entered on 2 February 1919 as a replacement for Alwin Saenger
Joseph Mausbach	Centre		
Wilhelm Maxen	Centre	18 (Süd-Hannover-Braunschweig)	
Wilhelm Mayer	Centre	27 (Oberbayern-Schwaben)	Joined BVP on 9 January 1920, resigned on 17 February 1920
Johannes Meerfeld	SPD	23 (Köln-Aachen)	
Richard Meier	SPD	33 (Chemnitz-Zwickau)	
Christian Meisner	DDP		Entered in Mai 1919 as a replacement for Christian Ritter von Langheinrich
Clara Mende	DVP	Reichswahlvorschlag	
Wilhelm Merck	BVP	Reichswahlvorschlag	Entered in February 1920 as a replacement for Benedikt Hebel
August Merges	USPD		Resigned on 28 February 1919
Peter Michelsen	SPD	14 (Schleswig-Holstein)	
Fritz Mittelmann	DVP	6 (Pommern)	
Hermann Molkenbuhr	SPD	33 (Chemnitz-Zwickau)	
Albrecht Morath	DVP	Reichswahlvorschlag	
Julius Moses	USPD	2 (Berlin)	
Otto Most	DVP	26 (Düsseldorf-West)	
Hermann Müller	SPD	29 (Franken)	
Hermann Müller	SPD		
Richard Müller	Centre		Resigned on 31 January 1920
Reinhard Mumm	DNVP	20 (Westfalen-Süd)	
Josef Nacken	Centre	23 (Köln-Aachen)	
Anna Nemitz	USPD	9 (Liegnitz)	Joined SPD in September 1922
Friedrich Naumann	DDP		Died on 24 August 1919
Agnes Neuhaus	Centre	20 (Westfalen-Süd)	
Adolf Neumann-Hofer	DDP		
Matthias Neyses	Centre	24 (Coblenz-Trier)	
Emil Nitzschke	DDP		Resigned on 20 January 1920
Ferdinand Noske	DNVP		
Gustav Noske	SPD		
Otto Nuschke	DDP		
Ernst Oberfohren	DNVP	14 (Schleswig-Holstein)	
Karl Obermeyer	SPD	25 (Düsseldorf-Ost)	
Richard Oertel	DVP	24 (Coblenz-Trier)	
Wilhelm Ohler	DNVP		
Karl Okonsky	SPD	10 (Oppeln)	Entered in July 1919 as a replacement for Josef Kubetzko
Karl Ollmert	Centre		
Nikolaus Osterroth	SPD		
Waldemar Otte	Centre		
Hermann Pachnicke	DDP	4 (Potsdam I)	
Johann Panzer	SPD		
Richard Partzsch	SPD		Entered on 3 January 1920 as a replacement for August Winnig
Friedrich von Payer	DDP		
Carl Wilhelm Petersen	DDP	15 (Hamburg)	
Wilhelm Pfannkuch	SPD		
Maximilian Pfeiffer	Centre	2 (Berlin)	
Antonie Pfülf	SPD	27 (Oberbayern-Schwaben)	
Albrecht Philipp	DNVP	32 (Leipzig)	
Otto Pick	DDP		
Karl Pinkau	SPD	32 (Leipzig)	
Alexander Pohlmann	DDP	10 (Oppeln)	
Franz Pokorny	SPD		
Arthur von Posadowsky-Wehner	DNVP		
Alois Puschmann	Centre	8 (Breslau)	
Max Quarck	SPD		
Ludwig Quessel	SPD	22 (Hessen-Darmstadt)	
Ludwig Quidde	DDP		
Fritz Raschig	DDP		
Friedrich Rauch	SPD		
Gustav Raute	USPD	12 (Merseburg)	
Walter Reek	SPD		
Heinrich Reineke	DVP		
Hermann Paul Reißhaus	SPD	13 (Thuringia)	
Johanne Reitze	SPD	15 (Hamburg)	
Ernst Remmers	DDP		
Anton Rheinländer	Centre	20 (Westfalen-Süd)	
Adolf Richter	DNVP	1 (Ostpreußen)	
Johann Sophian Christian Richter	Centre		
Hartmann von Richthofen	DDP		
Lorenz Riedmiller	SPD	35 (Baden)	
Jakob Riesser	DVP	21 (Hessen-Nassau)	
Paul Rodemann	SPD		
Elisabeth Röhl	SPD		
Paul Röhle	SPD		
Gustav Roesicke	DNVP	Reichswahlvorschlag	
Kurt Rosenfeld	USPD	13 (Thuringia)	Entered on 3 May 1920 as a replacement for Emanuel Wurm
Leopold Rückert	SPD		
Heinrich Runkel	DVP	14 (Schleswig-Holstein)	
Elfriede Ryneck	SPD	3 (Potsdam II)	
Hermann Sachse	SPD		
Alwin Saenger	SPD		Resigned on 2 February 1919
Robert Sagawe	Centre		
Albert Salm	SPD		
Ernst Schädlich	SPD		
Valentin Schäfer	SPD		
Josef Schefbeck	Centre		
Philipp Scheidemann	SPD	21 (Hessen-Nassau)	
Martin Schiele	DNVP	11 (Magdeburg)	
Eugen Schiffer	DDP	11 (Magdeburg)	
Karl Matthias Schiffer	Centre		Resigned on 24 September 1919
Joseph Schilgen	Centre		Entered on 24 September 1919 as a replacement for Karl Matthias Schiffer
Minna Schilling	SPD	33 (Chemnitz-Zwickau)	
Carl Schirmer	Centre	29 (Franken)	Joined BVP on 9 January 1920
Käthe Schirmacher	DNVP		
Peter Schlack	Centre	25 (Düsseldorf-Ost)	
Alexander Schlicke	SPD	Reichswahlvorschlag	
Wilhelm Schlüter	SPD		
Richard Schmidt	SPD	31 (Dresden-Bautzen)	
Richard Schmidt	SPD		
Robert Schmidt	SPD	Reichswahlvorschlag	
Wilhelm Schmidthals	DDP		
Adam Josef Schmitt	Centre		
Maria Schmitz	Centre		
Alexander Schneider	Centre		
Gustav Schneider	DDP		
Georg Schöpflin	SPD	35 (Baden)	
Carl Schreck	SPD	19 (Westfalen-Nord)	
Louise Schroeder	SPD	14 (Schleswig-Holstein)	
Clara Schuch	SPD	2 (Berlin)	
Walther Schücking	DDP	21 (Hessen-Nassau)	
Wilhelm Schümmer	Centre		
Georg Schultz	DNVP	Reichswahlvorschlag	
Heinrich Schulz	SPD	Reichswahlvorschlag	
Hermann Schulz	SPD	Westpreußen	
Wilhelm Schulz	SPD		
Gerhart von Schulze-Gävernitz	DDP		Entered on 12 April 1919 as a replacement for Hermann Dietrich
Oswald Schumann	SPD	5 (Frankfurt (Oder))	
Jean Albert Schwarz	Centre	21 (Hessen-Nassau)	
Rudolf Schwarzer	BVP	27 (Oberbayern-Schwaben)	
Friedrich Seger	USPD	32 (Leipzig)	
Friedrich Wilhelm Semmler	DNVP	8 (Breslau)	
Carl Severing	SPD	19 (Westfalen-Nord)	
Richard Seyfert	DDP		
Otto Sidow	SPD	4 (Potsdam I)	
Ernst Siehr	DDP		
Karl Sielermann	DNVP		Entered on 29 September 1919 as a replacement for Wilhelm Wallbaum
Anna Simon	SPD		
Hermann Silberschmidt	SPD	11 (Magdeburg)	
Georg Simon	SPD	27 (Oberbayern-Schwaben)	
Josef Simon	USPD	29 (Franken)	Resigned on 21 November 1919
Hugo Sinzheimer	SPD		
Hans Sivkovich	DDP	7 (Mecklenburg)	
Wilhelm Sollmann	SPD	23 (Köln-Aachen)	
Peter Spahn	Centre	Reichswahlvorschlag	
Emil Stahl	SPD		
Michael Stapfer	Centre		
Franz Starosson	SPD		
Otto Steinmayer	SPD		
Wilhelm Steinsdorff	DDP		
Adam Stegerwald	Centre	19 (Westfalen-Nord)	
Willy Steinkopf	SPD	Reichswahlvorschlag	
Johannes Stelling	SPD	7 (Mecklenburg)	
Christian Stock	SPD		
Otto Stolten	SPD	15 (Hamburg)	
Paul Stössel	SPD		Resigned on 2 February 1919
Gustav Stresemann	DVP	3 (Potsdam II)	
Franz Strzoda	Centre		
Daniel Stücklen	SPD	33 (Chemnitz-Zwickau)	
Thomas Szczeponik	Centre	10 (Oppeln)	
Theodor Tantzen der Jüngere	DDP		Resigned on 31 October 1919
Paul Taubadel	SPD	9 (Liegnitz)	
Eugen Taucher	Centre		Joined BVP on 9 January 1920, resigned on 1 February 1920
Johanna Tesch	SPD	21 (Hessen-Nassau)	
Christine Teusch	Centre	23 (Köln-Aachen)	
Johannes Thabor	SPD	26 (Düsseldorf-West)	
Adolf Thiele	SPD		
Georg Thöne	SPD	21 (Hessen-Nassau)	
Detlef Thomsen	SHBLD		Resigned on 7 July 1919
Franz Thurow	SPD		Entered on 11 February 1919 as a replacement for Friedrich Ebert
Gottfried Traub	DNVP		
Peter Tremmel	Centre	24 (Coblenz-Trier)	
Karl Trimborn	Centre	23 (Köln-Aachen)	
Oskar Trinks	SPD		
Carl Ulitzka	Centre	10 (Oppeln)	
Carl Ulrich	SPD	22 (Hessen-Darmstadt)	
Karl Veidt	DNVP		Resigned on 29 August 1919
Wilhelm Vershofen	DDP		
Otto Vesper	SPD		
Albert Vögler	DVP	20 (Westfalen-Süd)	
Hans Vogel	SPD	29 (Franken)	
Wilhelm Vogt	DNVP	34 (Württemberg)	
Fritz Voigt	SPD		
Friedrich Wachhorst de Wente	DDP		
Felix Waldstein	DDP	14 (Schleswig-Holstein)	
Wilhelm Wallbaum	DNVP		Resigned on 29 September 1919
Fritz Warmuth	DNVP	5 (Frankfurt (Oder))	
Helene Weber	Centre		
Victor Weidtman	DVP		
Luitpold Weilnböck	DNVP	29 (Franken)	
Friedrich Weinhausen	DDP	Westpreußen	
Konrad Weiß	DDP	29 (Franken)	
Franz Xaver Weixler	BVP	27 (Oberbayern-Schwaben)	Entered in March 1920 as a replacement for Wilhelm Mayer
Otto Wels	SPD	5 (Frankfurt (Oder))	
Hugo Wendorff	DDP		
Kuno von Westarp	DNVP	3 (Potsdam II)	
Johannes Wetzlich	DNVP		
Franz Wieber	Centre	26 (Düsseldorf-West)	
Philipp Wieland	DDP	34 (Württemberg)	
Carl Winkelmann	SPD		
August Winnefeld	DVP	20 (Westfalen-Süd)	
August Winnig	SPD		Resigned on 3 January 1920
Joseph Wirth	Centre	35 (Baden)	
Rudolf Wissell	SPD		
Franz Heinrich Witthoefft	DVP		
Theodor Wolff	SPD		
Emanuel Wurm	USPD		Died on 3 May 1920
Constantin Zawadzki	Centre	10 (Oppeln)	
Johann Anton Zehnter	Centre		
Marie Zettler	Centre		
Paul Ziegler	DDP	20 (Westfalen-Süd)	
Luise Zietz	USPD	2 (Berlin)	
Georg Zöphel	DDP		
Fritz Zubeil	USPD	3 (Potsdam II)	

== See also ==
- Herrenchiemsee convention of 1948
- Parlamentarischer Rat of 1949
