= Carl Herold =

German politician

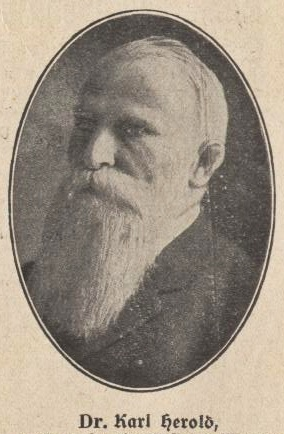
Carl Herold in 1922

Carl Herold (July 20, 1848 – January 13, 1931) was a German politician of the German Centre Party. He was a long-serving member of state and national legislative bodies during the German Empire and the Weimar Republic.

== Personal life ==
Herold was born in Loevelingloh (now part of Münster), Westphalia, the son of Ferdinand Herol, the first professor of pharmaceutical botany at the University of Münster, Germany. Herold later gained ownership of the estate by marrying Lövingloh in the district of Münster. After graduating from high school in Münster, Herold studied at the University of Halle-Wittenberg in 1867/68, completing a degree in agricultural training. In 1870, he took over his father's estate, Loevelingloh.

== Political career ==
Herold was a member of the Centre Party and was chairman of the Westphalia branch of the party. His primary duty was the representation of rural interests. He did not participate in the general election in 1924 set up by the peasants of the Münsterland, which drew criticism from his constituency. He did participate in one representing predominantly industrial areas in a constituency in south Westphalia.

Herold was a member of the Münster district council for several decades, and also sat on the local Kreisausschuss (district committee). He was also a member of the provincial parliament of the Province of Westphalia. From 1890 to 1918, he was a member of the Prussian House of Representatives, where he served as deputy chairman of the Center Party parliamentary group. From 1898 to 1918, he was elected as a deputy of the Reichstag. Initially, he represented the electoral constituency of Fulda-Gersfeld-Schlüchtern and, from 1903 onward, he represented the Tecklenburg-Steinfurt-Ahaus district. In 1919–20 he was a member of the Weimar National Assembly. From 1919 until his death, he was member of the Landtag of Prussia, where he held the position of chairman of his party's faction. He also returned as a deputy of the Reichstag from electoral constituency Westphalia North during the Weimar Republic from 1920 until his death. As the oldest member of that body, he opened the fifth legislative period of the Reichstag in 1930 as interim president. He died in Münster.

=== Agricultural chairships ===
Herold was named to a number of committees, associations, and groups influencing agricultural policy in Germany. These include:

- Director, Agricultural Central Association for the administrative district of Münster.
- Member, Board of Agriculture of Westfalen Westphalian Peasant Association.
- Member, German government for rural welfare.
- Chairman, Board of Examiners for Agricultural Machinery and Equipment in Westphalia.
- Director, Dairy Association of Westfalen and Lippe.
- Board Member, Rural Central Treasury and the Association of Rural Cooperatives.
- Successor, Burghard Schorlemer-Alst representing the interests of Westphalia agriculture.
- Affiliation, social wing of the Catholic milieu, belonged to the People's Association for Catholic Germany.

== Sources ==
- Information about Carl Herold in the Reichstag database
- Wilhelm Schulte: "Die (Familie) Herold". In: Westfälische Köpfe. Münster, 1963. S. 111ff.
