= Anna Simon (politician) =

German trade unionist and politician

Member of the Weimar National Assembly
- In office 1919–1920
- Constituency: West Prussia

Member of the Landtag of Prussia
- In office 1921–1924

Personal details
- Born: 6 January 1862; Berlin, Prussia
- Died: 23 June 1926 (aged 64); Berlin, Germany

Anna Simon (6 January 1862 – 23 June 1926) was a German trade unionist and politician. In 1919 she was one of the 36 women elected to the Weimar National Assembly, the first female parliamentarians in Germany. She remained a member of parliament until the following year and later served as a member of the Landtag of Prussia from 1921 to 1924.

== Biography ==
Simon was born in Berlin in 1862, the daughter of an apprentice tailor. She was educated at the Hedwigschule, after which she worked as a Kurbelstepperin (operator of Bonnaz embroidery machines) until 1908. She became involved with the labour movement in the 1880s, and was one of the founders of the Verbandes der Kurbelstepper (Association of Kurbelsteppers), serving as its second chair from 1900 to 1904. She became a board member of the Berlin branch of the Textile Workers' Association in January 1908 and began working for the association in November the same year, initially based in Forst, before relocating to Brandenburg an der Havel in 1911. She also joined the Social Democratic Party (SPD), becoming a member of its district board in Westhavelland in 1911. Between 1916 and 1919 she worked as an accounts officer for the People's Welfare Service in Brandenburg.

In 1919 she was elected to the Weimar National Assembly from the West Prussia constituency as a representative of the SPD. Although she lost her seat in the 1920 Reichstag elections, she was elected to the Landtag of Prussia in 1921, remaining a member until 1924. She died in Berlin in 1926.
