= Anna Hübler (politician) =

German politician (1876–1923)

Member of the National Assembly
- In office 1919–1920

Personal details
- Born: 23 December 1876 Leipzig, Germany
- Died: 24 June 1923 (aged 46) Schkeuditz, Germany

Anna Hübler (23 December 1876 – 24 June 1923) was a German politician. In 1919 she was one of the 36 women elected to the Weimar National Assembly, the first female parliamentarians in Germany. She remained a member of parliament until the following year.

== Biography ==
Hübler was born in Leipzig in 1876, the daughter of printer Konrad Müller. After leaving school she worked as an office clerk before marrying typesetter Paul Hübler. Both Konrad and Paul were amongst the leadership of the Social Democratic Party in Halle-Merseburg province and she became involved with the party, helping establish the party's women's organisations and becoming involved with the Die Gleichheit magazine.

In 1917 she followed her husband and father in joining the Independent Social Democratic Party (USPD). Two years later she was elected to the Weimar National Assembly as a representative of the USPD. She ran for re-election in the 1920 Reichstag elections, but lost her seat. She subsequently ran unsuccessfully for election to the provincial Landtag of Saxony and the Landtag of Prussia in 1921.

She died in Schkeuditz in 1923.
