= Alexander Pohlmann =

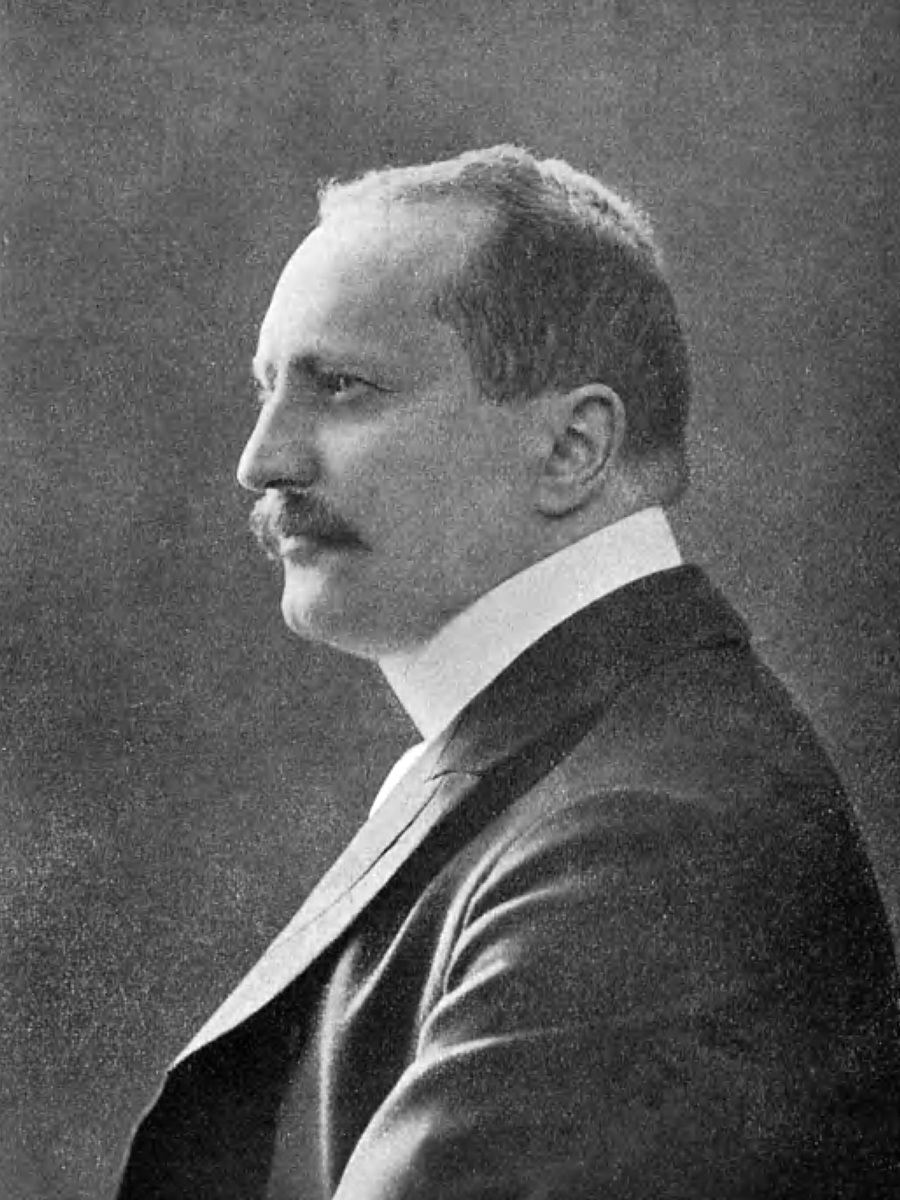

Lord Mayor of Kattowitz
- In office February 1903 – January 1920

Member of the Provinziallandtag of the Province of Silesia
- In office 1904/1909–1920

Member of the Prussian House of Representatives
- In office 1915–1918

Member of the National Assembly
- In office 1919–1920

Member of the Reichstag
- In office 1920–1922

President of Regierungsbezirk Magdeburg
- In office 1920–1930

Personal details
- Born: 10 September 1865 Graudenz, West Prussia, Kingdom of Prussia (Grudziądz, Poland)
- Died: 5 October 1952 (aged 87) Freiburg, West Germany
- Party: Progressive People's Party (Germany); German Democratic Party (DDP)
- Occupation: lawyer

Alexander Pohlmann (10 September 1865 – 5 October 1952) was a liberal German politician, mayor of Kattowitz (Katowice, Poland) and member of the Weimar National Assembly and the Weimar German parliament.

Pohlmann was born in Graudenz, West Prussia, (Grudziądz, Poland), his father was the mayor of Graudenz. He studied law and administrative sciences in Freiburg, Leipzig and Berlin and started to work at the municipal administration of Frankfurt (Main) in 1896 and Posen (Poznań) in 1899.

Pohlmann became the Lord Mayor of Kattowitz in 1903, a position he held until January 1920. He became a member of the Fortschrittliche Volkspartei and was elected as a member of the regional parliament of the Province of Silesia in 1904 (or 1909) (Note: The parliamentarian handbook of 1919 gives 1904 as starting date while the handbook of 1920 states 1909) and member of the Prussian House of Representatives in 1915.

After World War I he became a member of the German Democratic Party and was elected a member of the Weimar National Assembly in 1919 and the German Reichstag from 1920 to 1922. He served as the President of the Regierungsbezirk Magdeburg from 1920 to 1930. Pohlmann died in Freiburg in 1952.
