= Frieda Hauke =

German politician (1890–1972)

Member of the Reichstag
- In office 1920–1922

Member of the Weimar National Assembly
- In office 1919–1920

Personal details
- Born: 6 April 1890 Breslau, Germany
- Died: 15 August 1972 (aged 82) Hemmingen, West Germany

Frieda Hauke (6 April 1890 – 15 August 1972) was a German politician. In 1919 she was one of the 36 women elected to the Weimar National Assembly, the first female parliamentarians in Germany. She remained a member of parliament until 1922.

== Biography ==
Hauke was born Frieda Kirsch in Breslau in 1890. She attended school in Breslau until the age of eight and Kattowitz until the age of 14, after which she trained to be an office clerk at a private business school. She subsequently worked as an office clerk and a saleswoman until marrying Paul Hauke in 1909. She later worked at the welfare office in Kattowitz. Following World War I she worked for the city's demobilisation committee.

In 1919 Hauke was elected to the Weimar National Assembly as a representative of the Social Democratic Party (SPD). She served in the subsequent Reichstag until new members were elected from Oppeln in 1922. She and her husband were briefly imprisoned in 1944 due to their earlier membership of the SPD. After World War II the couple left Silesia, which had been ceded to Poland, and moved to Lower Saxony in what became West Germany. In 1949 she was elected to the first Federal Convention that was convened to elect a president. The following year she became a member of the District Board for Hanover.
