= Frida Lührs =

German politician (1869–1941)

Member of the Weimar National Assembly
- In office 1919–1920

Personal details
- Born: 1 July 1869; Frankfurt, Prussia
- Died: 17 August 1941 (aged 72); Hannover, Germany

Frida Lührs (1 July 1869 – 17 August 1941) was a German politician. In 1919 she was one of the 36 women elected to the Weimar National Assembly, the first female parliamentarians in Germany. She remained a member of parliament until the following year.

== Biography ==
Lührs was born in Frankfurt in 1869. She attended middle school in Bockenheim and subsequently worked as a domestic assistant. She married in 1893, after which she became manager of a trading company. In 1917 she became a welfare worker at the women's employment registration office, a branch of the war office. After the end of World War II, she took a position at the women's unemployment welfare organisation in Hannover.

A member of the Social Democratic Party, she was elected to the Weimar National Assembly from Province of Posen in the January 1919 elections. She lost her seat in the June 1920 election and returned to working at the unemployment welfare organisation, where she remained until 1933.

She died in Hannover in 1941.
