= Fritz Zubeil =

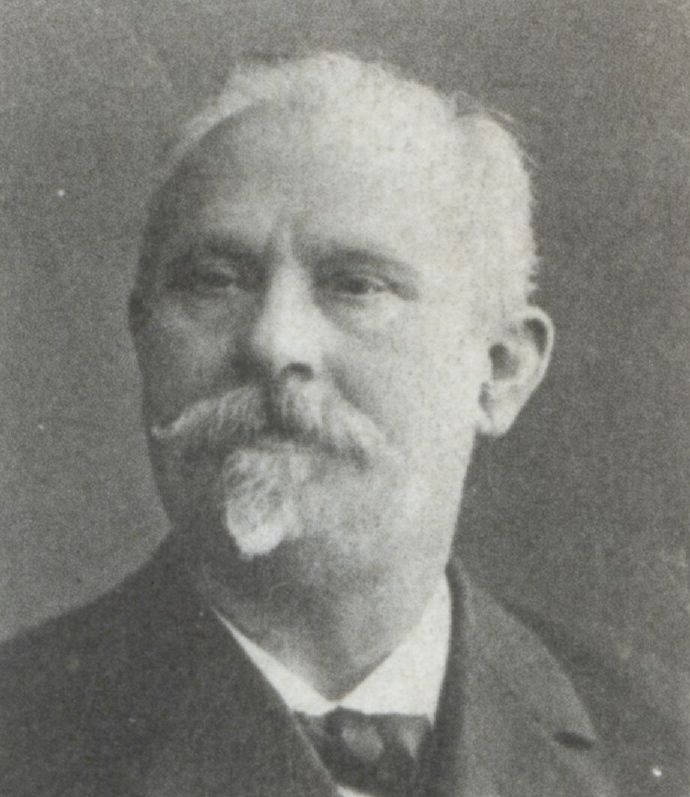
Karl Friedrich "Fritz" Zubeil

Karl Friedrich "Fritz" Zubeil (11 January 1848, in Leśniów Wielki, District Grünberg in Silesia – 27 December 1926, in Berlin) was a German politician (SPD; USPD).

== Life and work ==
Zubeil was born as the son of a police sergeant and a council servant. He attended from 1855 to 1863 the primary school and trade school in Grünberg. Between 1863 and 1866 he worked as a carpenter. From 1868 to 1872 he belonged to the 35th Infantry Regiment. After that he settled as a carpenter in Berlin. In 1872 Zubeil also joined the Social Democratic Party.

From 13 February 1890 to 1901 Zubeil was a city councilor in Berlin. That same year he became deputy in the SPD party. Due to his political activities, he lost his job as a carpenter, instead he earned his living from 1890 to 1898 as an innkeeper. Zubeil represented the SPD as a member of the Reichstag of the German Empire from June 1893, a position that he held henceforth without interruption until November 1918. In later years Zubeil operated a restaurant in the Berlin Lindenstraße 69. At this time, the SPD leadership, to which Zubeil also temporarily belonged, met on the fourth floor of the same house. In 1899 Zubeil became clerk of the Vorwärts (Forward), the central organ of the SPD. He held this position to 1917. He was also a member of Innkeepers Association and the Wood Workers Association and a board member of the construction workers cooperative Ideal.

During the World War I, Zubeil left the SPD and became a member of the Independent Social Democratic Party of Germany Independent Social Democratic Party of Germany (USPD), a new party that consisted primarily of representatives of the left wing of the SPD, who opposed the war policy of the SPD leadership. During the fighting in the wake of the November Revolution, Zubeil was taken temporarily imprisoned. In January 1919 Zubeil was candidate of the USPD for the constituency 5 (Potsdam 10) and was elected into the Weimar National Assembly. On 2 March 1919 Zubeil opened the first Congress of the USPD after the November revolution. In June 1920 Zubeil obtained a seat for the Constituency 3 (Potsdam II) in the first Reichstag of the Weimar Republic. During the next legislature Zubeil left the USPD and returned in 1922 back to the SPD, he also joined the Reichstag. In the Reichstag elections of May 1924 and from December 1924 Zubeil was re-elected, then after the constituencies had been re-numbered, he represented Constituency 3 (Potsdam II) until his death in December 1926.

The grave of Zubeil is located at the Central Cemetery Friedrichsfelde. Today, the Fritz-Zubeil Street in Potsdam reminds about Zubeil's life and political activity.
