= Johanna Tesch =

German politician

- Johanna Tesch 1910
- Born: Johanna Friederike Carillon; 24 March 1875; Frankfurt am Main, Hesse-Nassau, Germany
- Died: 13 March 1945 (aged 69); KZ Ravensbrück, Brandenburg, Germany
- Occupations: Trades Union activist & Politician
- Political party: SPD
- Spouse: Richard Tesch
- Children: 3

Johanna Friederike Tesch (born Carillon; 24 March 1875 – 13 March 1945) was a leading German Social Democratic Party politician, most active on the national stage during the 1920s.

After 1933, as Germany became a one party dictatorship, she and her husband Richard stayed in the country. She died in Ravensbrück concentration camp.

== Life ==
=== Early years ===
Johanna Friederike Carillon was born into a family originally of Huguenot provenance in the Sachsenhausen quarter of Frankfurt am Main, on the south side of the river. She attended school locally at the "Souchay-Mittelschule" between 1882 and 1889, but received no higher education or training. Her father was a master tailor, and until her marriage in 1899 or 1900 Johanna lived "at home, helping with the housework". In 1896, Johanna bore the son of Richard Tesch, a Prussian tailor who had come to apprentice with her father in 1892. The child was baptised Friedrich and the couple married in 1899 after which they had two more sons Wilhelm (1899) and Carl (1902).

=== Political engagement ===
Following the birth of her youngest son, Carl, in 1902, Johanna began to engage in political activities, initially at a local level. Her political focus lay with the Social Democratic Party (SPD). Until 1908 women were not allowed to join political parties in Germany. Although she joined the SPD officially in 1909, the branch membership book records her joining in 1902. She campaigned for better educational opportunities for working-class women and girls: she was co-founder in 1902, together with Lina Heiden and Henriette Fürth, of the "Education Association for Working Class Women and Girls" (Bildungsvereins für Frauen und Mädchen der Arbeiterklasse”). From 1904 she also worked as a cashier at the Trades Union Office that had recently opened in Frankfurt's "All Saints Street" ("Allerheiligenstraße") to provide organisational support for union activities and to operate as a labour exchange.

Another focus of her interest was the plight of the many female domestic servants working in Frankfurt who suffered from long hours, arbitrary working conditions and were not permitted to join a trades union. In 1906 Tesch founded and became the first Chairwoman of the Frankfurt area "Association of Domestic and Office employees" ("Frankfurter Ortsgruppe des Zentralverbandes der Haus- und Büroangestellten"). In November 1919 together with Lina Heiden and Henriette Fürth, she founded the "Association for Female Domestic Employees" („Verein für weibliche Hausangestellte”), campaigning for the abolition of Germany's prescriptive Laws on Domestic Service and the introduction in the sector of free work contracts. In 1908 she took on the role of cashier, for which she was paid a salary and in 1911 took over from Mala Rudolph as Chairwoman of the Association.

=== War ===
Her eldest son, Friedel, was killed in the war, but this was not the only reason why she devoted her energies to providing support for the families of war victims. From 1916 to 1920 she worked at Frankfurt's welfare office for war widows and orphans and engaged in fund raising for the bereaved and for war veterans suffering from shell shock. In 1916 she became a member of the "Municipal Deputation for Lunatics and Epileptics" ("Städtische Deputation für Irre und Epileptische")

=== National politics ===
Tesch (left) with other women of the SPD in 1919

The revolutionary year that followed military defeat was marked by widespread social and political unrest, as well as the abdication of the emperor. 1919 also saw the birth of what came to be known (albeit not till 1929 when Adolf Hitler coined the term as an expression of contempt) as the Weimar Republic. Johanna Tesch moved from regional activism into national politics. She won a mandate to represent the electoral district of Hesse-Nassau ("19. Wakhlkreis") at the Constitutional Convention which met at Weimar between February and June 1919, producing a new Constitution ("Die Verfassung des Deutschen Reichs").

Her name was again included on the SPD party list for the national election in June 1920: although the SPD lost a third of its seats, it remained the largest party in the national assembly, and Tesch's name was high enough up on the party list to ensure her membership of the Reichstag between 1920 and May 1924, again representing a Hesse-Nassau electoral district("21. Wakhlkreis"). Parliamentary records show that she contributed to debates on matters that included household welfare legislation ("Haushaltshilfengesetz") and the 1923 budget.

The party lost further ground in the election of May 1924, and Johanna Tesch lost her seat in the chamber. By this time she had established a strong reputation as a public speaker, however, and for the next few years she gave public presentations on behalf of the SPD on matters such as housing poverty, taxation policy, educational questions and, ever more, on matters specific to women.

=== Nazi Germany ===
Johanna Tesch was a couple of months short of her sixtieth birthday when the Nazis took power early in 1933. Membership of political parties (other than of the Nazi Party) quickly became illegal, and Richard Tesch, her husband, as well as her youngest son, Carl, lost their jobs at the trades union printing works when the SPD party newspaper, "Volksstimme" ("People's Voice") was closed down in March 1933. In October 1935 Carl Tesch, who had engaged in (now illegal) trades union training work, was obliged to emigrate to Switzerland. Richard and Johanna Tesch lived on in retirement at their home in Frankfurt's recently built Riederwald quarter.

Her former trades union colleague, Paul Müller, had fled to Switzerland in 1934, and later recalled that during 1938 Johanna travelled to visit her son in Switzerland, where she stayed for some months. During this time she was able to have meetings with a number of exiled German trades unionists and with leaders of the Swiss Social Democratic Party. This did nothing to endear her to the German government. But eventually she returned home to Nazi Germany.

=== Death ===
On 20 July 1944 an assassination attempt was made against Adolf Hitler. The dictator survived, but the leadership were badly unnerved: the régime had already prepared a list of several thousand names of political adversaries, many of them surviving former left wing politicians from the Weimar era, to be used in the event of an escalation in political tension on the home front. Johanna Tesch's name was on the list. She was arrested on 22 August 1944 and taken to the concentration camp at Ravensbrück. By this time her second son, Wilhelm Tesch, had already been killed in the war. To assure her family she was well, she was permitted to postcards and some letters home, which were subject to SS censorship. She had, however, been suffering from serious heart and kidney illness at the time of her arrest. Her husband had tried, without success, to obtain her release on grounds of her poor health, sending written appeals for clemency to the Gestapo, the commandant of the Ravenbruck camp and even the Führer's office. Johanna died on 13 March 1945 probably from a combination of the medical conditions from which she had been suffering at the time of her arrest and the malnutrition which was endemic in the concentration camp.

In August 1945 Lore Wolf, one of the inmates newly released from Ravensbruck, brought Johanna's farewell letter to Richard in Frankfurt. He carried this and her other camp letters in a briefcase he took with him everywhere but it was stolen in the 1950s and the letters were never returned.
