= Margarete Behm =

German politician (1860–1929)

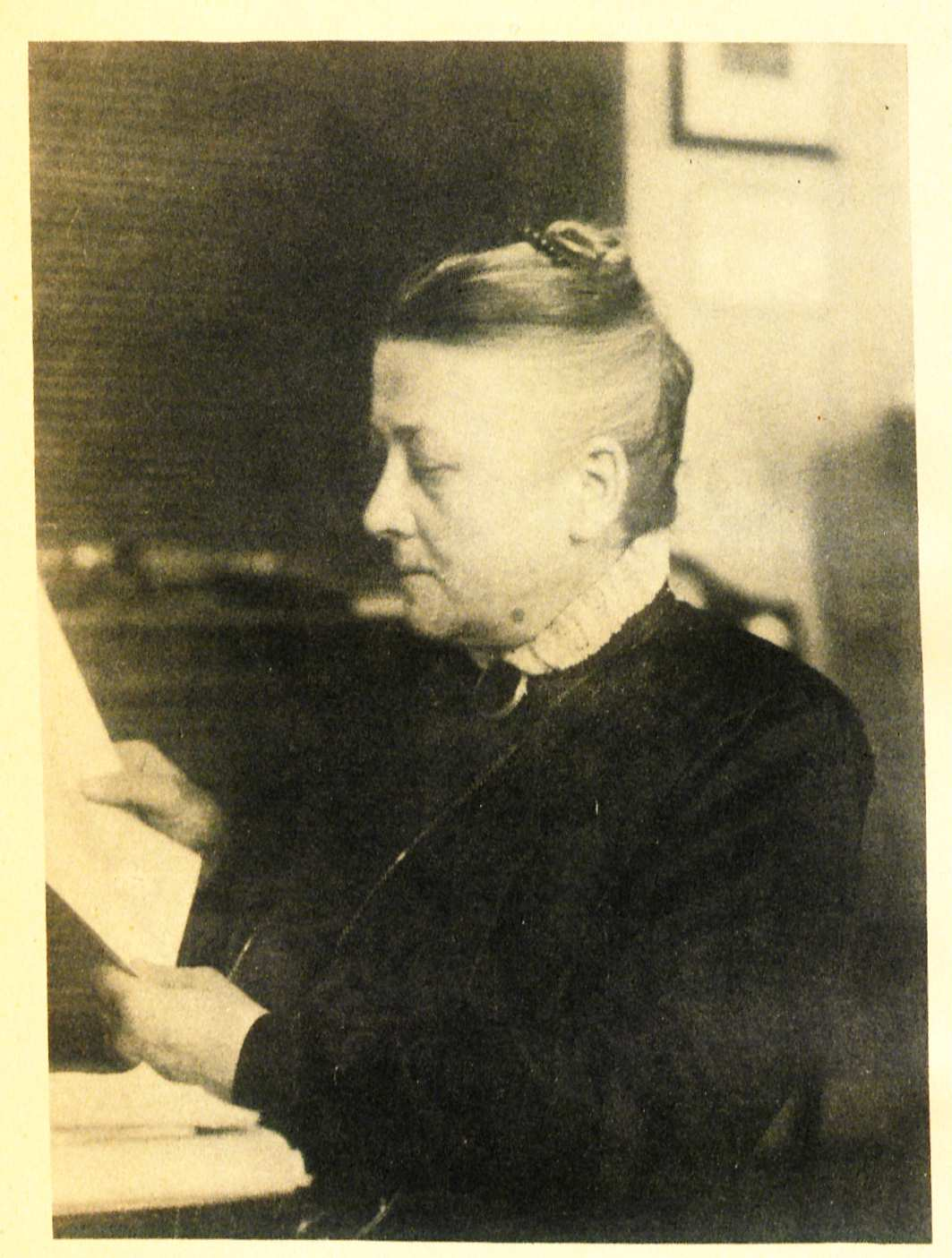

Member of the Reichstag
- In office 1920–1928

Member of the Weimar National Assembly
- In office 1919–1920

Personal details
- Born: 3 May 1860 Lehndorf, Prussia
- Died: 28 July 1929 (aged 69) Berlin, Germany

Margarete Behm (3 May 1860 – 28 July 1929) was a German educator, trade unionist and politician. In 1919 she was one of the 36 women elected to the Weimar National Assembly, the first female parliamentarians in Germany. She remained a member of parliament for the German National People's Party until 1928.

== Biography ==
Behm was born in Lehndorf in Prussia in 1860. She attended primary school in Koßdorf between 1867 and 1871 and then high school in Stolp. After leaving school in 1876, she trained to be a teacher in Berlin and became a high school teacher in 1879. In 1897 she established a trade union for domestic workers, and three years later began publishing a magazine, Die Heimarbeiterin.

In 1918 Behm was a founder member of the German National People's Party (DNVP) and headed its women's committee until 1923. She was a candidate for the party in the 1919 federal elections and was elected to the Weimar National Assembly as one of the first group of female parliamentarians in Germany. She was re-elected to the Reichstag in 1920 and in elections in May and December 1924, remaining in parliament until the 1928 elections.

She died in Berlin in 1929.
