= Else Höfs =

German politician (1876–1945)

Member of the Weimar National Assembly
- In office 1919–1920

Member of the Landtag of Prussia
- In office 1921–1928

Personal details
- Born: 2 September 1876 Berlin, Germany
- Died: 1946 (aged 69–70) Stralsund, Germany

Else Höfs (2 September 1876 – 1946) was a German politician. In 1919 she was one of the 36 women elected to the Weimar National Assembly, the first female parliamentarians in Germany. She remained a member of parliament until the following year, and subsequently served in the Landtag of Prussia from 1921 to 1928.

== Biography ==
Höfs was born Else Voight in Berlin in 1876, the daughter of the cigar dealer Georg Voigt. She attended school in Stettin, but her father was expelled from the city under the Anti-Socialist Laws and the family lived in Greifenhagen from 1887 to 1889. She worked as a domestic servant until 1894, when she married the painter Pauf Höfs, who later became city councillor in Stettin for the Social Democratic Party. The couple had two children. Höfs herself joined the SPD in 1905 and became the women's representative for Stettin. In 1912 she became a member of the district executive committee of the SPD in Pomerania, a role she held until 1933. During World War I she worked as a nurse for the Red Cross for eighteen months and for the National Women's Service, war welfare and welfare services.

In 1919 Höfs joined the Welfare, Youth and Orphan Office in Stettin. In the same year she was elected to the Weimar National Assembly as a representative of the SPD. The following year she was elected to Stettin City Council (on which she served until 1924), and in 1921 was elected to the Landtag of Prussia. She was re-elected in 1924 and served until the 1928 elections. She was also a member of the Pomeranian provincial Landtag. In 1932 she married Karl Kirchmann and the couple ran a grocery store until fleeing for Stralsund in 1945. She died the following year.
