= Minna Bollmann =

German politician

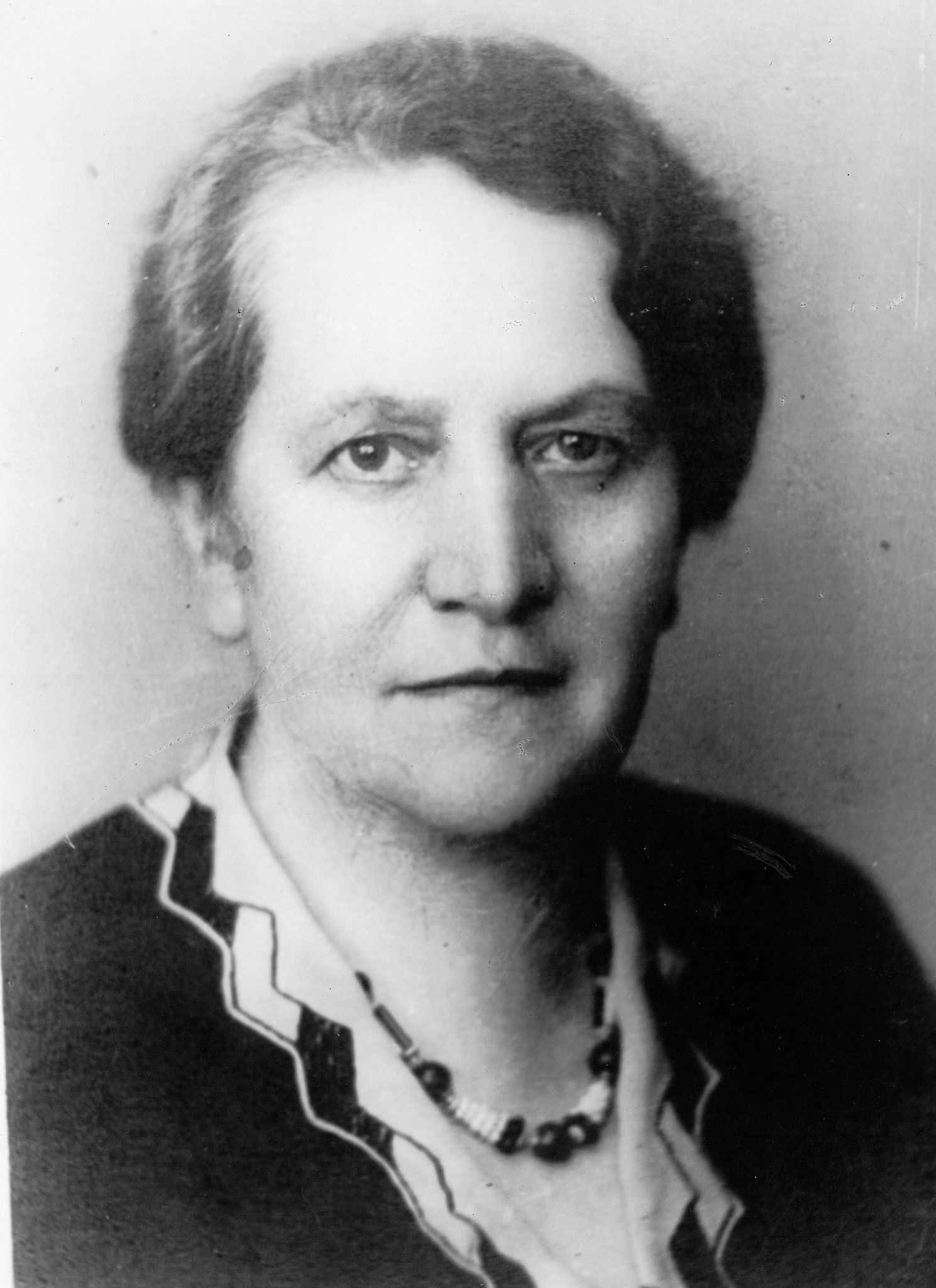
- Bollmann c. 1932

Member of the Weimar National Assembly
- In office 1919–1920

Member of the Landtag of Prussia
- In office 1921–1933

Personal details
- Born: Minna Zacharias; 31 January 1876 Halberstadt, Germany
- Died: 9 December 1935 (aged 59) Halberstadt, Germany

Minna Bollmann (née Zacharias; 31 January 1876 – 9 December 1935) was a German teacher, newspaper editor and politician. In 1919 she was one of the 36 women elected to the Weimar National Assembly, the first female parliamentarians in Germany. She remained a member of parliament until the following year.

== Biography ==
Bollmann was born Minna Zacharias in Halberstadt in 1876, the daughter of August Zacharias, a tailor who had founded the local branch of the Social Democratic Party (SPD). After leaving school, she trained to be a tailor from 1890 to 1892 and then worked as a tailor in Berlin until marrying innkeeper Max Bollmann in 1896, after which she ran her mother-in-law's restaurant with her husband. The couple had three children and the restaurant became a meeting place for the local SPD, which Bollmann joined in 1904. In 1907 she was a delegate to the first International Conference of Socialist Women in Stuttgart. During World War I she served as a district nurse in the war welfare department and worked for an organisation caring for women in the armed forces, widows and orphans.

She was elected to the Weimar National Assembly in 1919, becoming one of the first group of female parliamentarians in Germany. In the same year, she was elected to Halberstadt City Council and became a member of the central committee of the SPD, on which she served until 1922. She lost her seat in parliament in the 1920 Reichstag elections, but was elected to the Landtag of Prussia in 1921. She was re-elected in 1924, 1928 and 1932, remaining a member of the Landtag until 1933.

After the Nazis came to power in 1933, the Bollmanns' restaurant became a covert meeting place for SPD members and was regularly monitored by the Gestapo from 1935. Suffering from depression and with her arrest imminent, she committed suicide the same year. A street in Halberstadt was later named after her.
