= Johanna Reitze =

German politician and women's rights activist

Johanne Reitze (born Johanne Leopolt: 16 January 1878 – 22 February 1949) was a German politician (SPD) and women's rights activist. She sat as a member of the national parliament (Reichstag) between 1920 and 1932.

She may be identified in English language sources as Johanna Reitze.

== Life ==
Johanne Caroline Agnes Leopolt was born into a working-class family in Hamburg; her family were not religiously affiliated. She left school in 1893 and entered into domestic service. In 1894 she took work in a book printing business: colleagues introduced her to the labour movement. She then, in 1900, married a journalist, Johannes Carl Kilian-Reitze (? –1944). He was active in the Social Democratic Party, and is believed to have supported and influenced his wife's political trajectory. It is also recorded that she and her husband attended a presentation by the party chairman August Bebel.

During the First World War, Johanne Reitze worked as a nurse-carer, looking after the injured and the bereaved. She was a member of the advisory council of the Hamburg war supplies office and of the nutrition committee of the war kitchens. Much later, after the Nazi take-over had put an end to her political career, little is known about her activities during the twelve Nazi years. She was one of those persecuted by the Nazis. The attempt, in 1944, to assassinate the leader, failed in its immediate objective but succeeded in badly unnerving the government, which dusted down its old records of pre-1933 political opponents and, on the night of 22/23 August, set out to arrest large numbers of them. Many had gone away or died - often of natural causes - but Johanne Reitze was one of more than four thousand arrested, all over Germany, by the Gestapo and taken into protective custody. She remained in custody till war ended in May 1945 when she was freed by invading allied forces. Her apartment had been destroyed by enemy bombs.

After the war, now widowed, she participated in rebuilding welfare provision. She died in Hamburg on 22 February 1949.

== Politics ==
Johanne Reitze managed to join the Social Democratic Party (SPD) locally in 1902, although legally it only became permissible for women to participate in politics in 1908. In 1906/07 she and her husband spent half a year attending the party's political academy. Along with this, between 1904 and 1907 she attended a series of courses which enabled her, from 1907, to give speeches for the party and on behalf of the party leader, August Bebel. The outbreak of war in the summer of 1914 opened up increasingly stark divisions within the SPD, notably over whether or not the party's members in the German parliament ("Reichstag") should vote to support funding for the war. Reitze was one of those who supported the party leadership in their contentious decision to operate what amounted to a parliamentary truce for the duration of the war. The party line, to which she adhered, was that Germany was conducting a defensive war against Russian despotism.

Reitze was centrally involved in April 1918 when, for the first time, working class and middle-class women came together for a demonstration of Social Democrats at the Trades Union Building ("Gewerkschaftshaus") in favour of votes for women. This type of collaboration between the classes might have seemed odd a few years earlier, but during the war many Social Democrat women had become accustomed to working across the class divide during the course of wartime welfare and support work.

Between 1916 and 1919 she was a member of the Hamburg region SPD party committee, and till 1931 she was a frequent delegate for her city to national party conferences and party women's conferences. She also served, between 1919 and 1933, as a member of the party national committee.

When the war ended, in 1945, she was 67. She participated in the reconstruction effort.

== Parliamentarian ==
Johanne Reitze was one of the 36 women elected to the 421 seat Weimar National Assembly, the constitutional convention and temporary de facto parliament of Germany from 6 February 1919 to 6 June 1920 which drew up the constitution which was in force from 1919 to 1933. She was them, between 1920 and 1932, repeatedly re-elected as an SPD member of the German national parliament (Reichstag), representing Electoral District 15 (Hamburg). In the chamber the focus of her work was on what quickly came to be identified as "women's issues", such as social policy, welfare, youth, health and schools. She took a particular interest in improving the legal status of women workers.

As well as being a Reichastag member, between 1919 and 1921 Johanne Reitze served locally as a member of the Hamburg Parliament.

== Celebration ==
Reitzestraße ("Reitz Street") in Hamburg's Groß Borstel quarter was named after her in 1951. More recently Johanne-Reitze-Straße in the "Klein Horst" residential development in Hamburg-Ohlsdorf was named after her in 2007. Her grave stone is in the "Garden of the women" at the vast Ohlsdorf Cemetery to the north of the city centre.
