= Friedrich Seger =

German politician and trade unionist

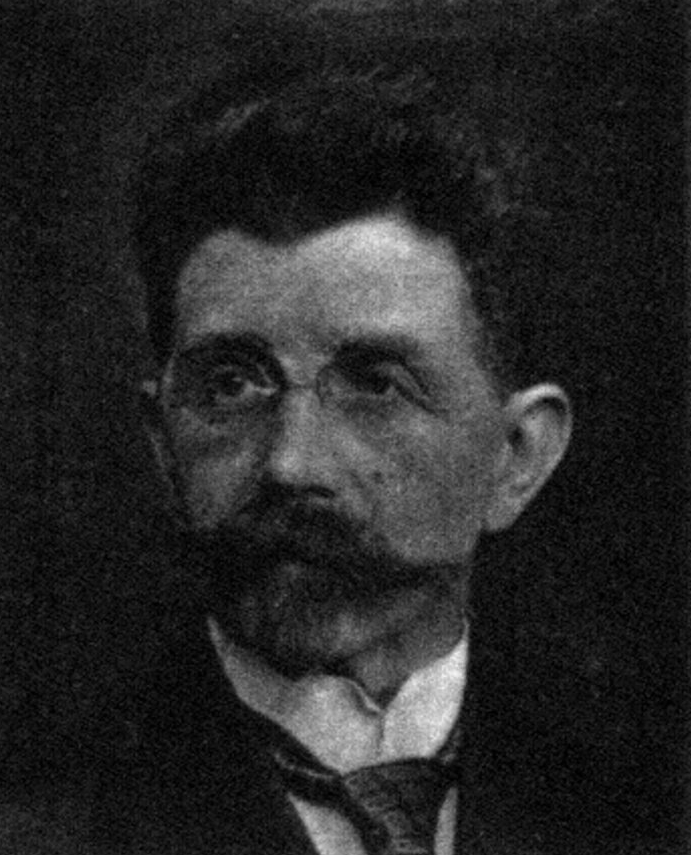
Seger c. 1919

Johann Friedrich Seger (25 February 1867 – 29 April 1928) was a German politician and trade unionist. in the Grand Duchy of Baden, Seger became a tailor, and joined both the Social Democratic Party of Germany (SPD) and a forerunner of the German Clothing Workers' Union in 1887. He held various posts in his union in the 1890s, and from 1893 was a leader of the SPD in Leipzig. In 1901, he became an editor on the Leipzig Volkszeitung.

In 1905, Seger was elected to the SPD's district leadership, and in 1911 to the Leipzig city council. In 1915, he was elected to the Saxon Diet, serving until 1918. He opposed World War I, and joined the Independent Social Democratic Party of Germany (USPD), under which label he was elected to the Weimar National Assembly, and then the Reichstag. He rejoined the SPD with the majority of the USPD, and continued to lead the party in Leipzig, alongside Richard Lipinski, until his death in 1928.
