= Moritz Baerwald =

German lawyer and politician

Member of the town council of Bromberg
- In office 1912–1918

Member of the Prussian House of Representatives
- In office 1902–1918
- Constituency: Bromberg 5 (Mogilno – Wongrowitz – Znin)

Member of the Weimar National Assembly
- In office 1919–1919

Personal details
- Born: 3 December 1860 Thorn, West Prussia, Prussia (Toruń, Poland)
- Died: 26 December 1919 (aged 59) Berlin, Weimar Germany
- Party: German Democratic Party (DDP)
- Occupation: lawyer

Moritz Baerwald (3 December 1860 – 26 December 1919) was a German lawyer and politician of the German Democratic Party, a member of the Prussian House of Representatives and the Weimar National Assembly.

Baerwald was born in Thorn, West Prussia (Toruń, Poland), where he grew up and passed his Abitur. He studied law at the Universities of Heidelberg, Leipzig and Berlin and started to practise as a lawyer in Bromberg (Bydgoszcz, Poland) in 1887 (notary since 1908).

Baerwald became an active member of the Jewish community of Bromberg and, in 1902, a member of the executive board of the Chamber of Advocates of Posen (Poznań, Poland). In 1903 Baerwald was elected a member of the town council of Bromberg and represented the constituency of Bromberg 5 (Mogilno – Wongrowitz – Znin) in the Prussian House of Representatives from 1912 to 1918. Following World War I he became a member of the Weimar National Assembly, where he vehemently opposed the incorporation of the Province of Posen into the Second Polish Republic.

Baerwald died in December 1919, within the legislative session, in Berlin and was buried at the Weißensee cemetery.
