= Elise Ekke =

German politician (1877–1957)

Member of the Weimar National Assembly
- In office 1919–1920
- Constituency: Posen

Personal details
- Born: 14 October 1877; Krotoschin, Germany
- Died: 3 December 1957 (aged 80); Kiel, West Germany

Elise Ekke (14 October 1877 – 3 December 1957) was a German politician. In 1919 she was one of the 36 women elected to the Weimar National Assembly, the first female parliamentarians in Germany. She remained a member of parliament until the following year.

== Biography ==
Ekke was born in Krotoschin in 1877. She was educated at the Luisenschule and then attended a teaching seminary in Posen. In 1899 she attended Friedrich Wilhelms University as a guest student, later attending the Academy in Posen. Between 1900 and 1905 she taught at a primary school, and from 1905 at a middle school in Posen.

After World War I she joined the German Democratic Party. She was elected to the Weimar National Assembly from Posen the following year, becoming one of the first group of female parliamentarians in Germany. She was not re-elected in 1920, and after Posen was lost to Poland as a result of the Treaty of Versailles, she moved to Kiel, where she died in 1957.
