= Romberg =

Romberg is a German surname which may refer to:

- Andreas Romberg (1767–1821), German composer, violinist
- Bernhard Romberg (1767–1841), German cellist and composer
- Brett Romberg (born 1979), American football player
- Luci Romberg, an American stuntwoman
- Moritz Heinrich Romberg (1795–1873), German physician (also see Romberg's test)
- Sigmund Romberg (1887–1951), Hungarian-born American composer
- Walter Romberg (1928–2014), German politician

== See also ==
- Romberg's method, a mathematical procedure for numerical integration
- Romberg's test, a medical test in neurology
