= Hermann Hüffer =

German historian (1830–1905)

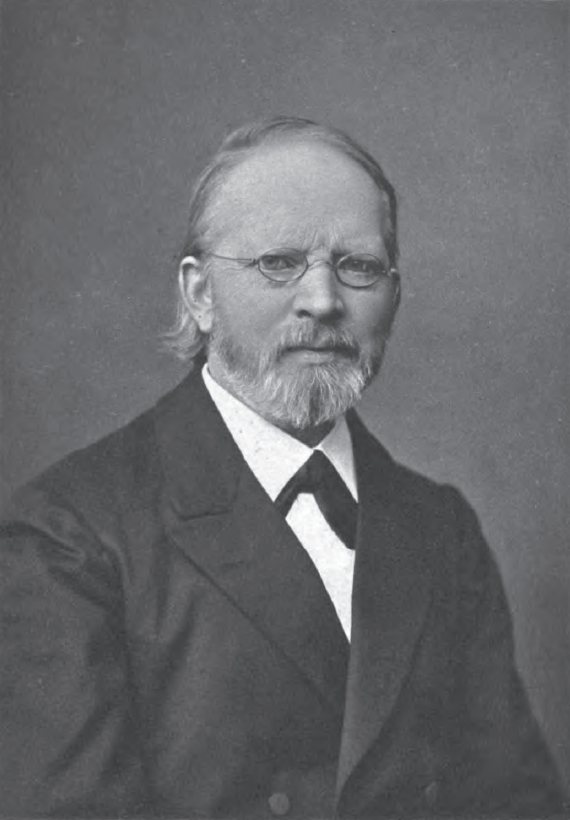
- Born: 24 March 1830; Münster
- Died: 15 March 1905 (aged 74); Bonn
- Occupations: historian and jurist

Hermann Hüffer (24 March 1830 – 15 March 1905) was a German historian and jurist.

== Biography ==
Hüffer was born in Münster, Prussian Westphalia. Having finished his classical education in his native city, he went to Bonn and applied himself to the study of philology, the history of literature, and history. He was compelled to take up jurisprudence in consequence of a serious disease of the eye, but never lost his fondness for history. In the year 1853 he graduated in Breslau with the dissertation: Justinianische Quasi-Pupilar-Substitution, and, after a long educational tour in Italy and France, qualified as lecturer on canon and Prussian civil law at Bonn. In 1860 he became professor extraordinary, and in 1873 ordinary professor.

From 1865 to 1870 he was a member of the Prussian Chamber of Deputies, and from 1867 to 1870 of the North German Reichstag, but did not affiliate with the Catholic Centre Party because the formation of a party on sectarian lines appeared to him a hazardous experiment.

== Works ==
Hüffer published numerous essays in periodicals and a few juristic professional treatises. His works on the history of literature include:

- Aus dem Leben Heinrich Heines (1878)
- Annette von Droste-Hülshoff und ihre Werke (1887)

His writings on other historical subjects are confined to a period of scarcely ten years, namely, the early years of the French Republic. It is suggested that he created an entirely new conception of the relations of the two great German powers to the French Revolution and to each other, and accordingly of the dissolution of the Holy Roman Empire of the German Nation.

His principal work is entitled: Diplomatische Verhandlungen aus der Zeit der französischen Revolution (Diplomatic negotiations at the time of the French Revolution) in three volumes (1869–79). The first volume treats of the hostility of Austria and Prussia to the revolution down to the Treaty of Campo Formio, while the second and third deal with the Congress of Rastatt and the Second Coalition.

Hüffer's other historical works include:

- Der Krieg von 1799 und die 2. Koalition (2 volumes, 1904)
- Quellen zur Geschichte des Zeitalters der französischen Revolution (Historical sources in the age of the French Revolution) (2 vols., 1900-)
