= Hermann Schulz (politician) =

German politician (1872–1929)

Member of the town council of Elbing
- In office 1913–1919

Member of the Weimar National Assembly
- In office 1919–1920

Member of the Reichstag (Weimar Republic)
- In office 1920–1929
- Constituency: East Prussia

Personal details
- Born: 24 August 1872 Elbing, West Prussia, German Empire (Elbląg, Poland)
- Died: 10 August 1929 (aged 56) Berlin, Weimar Germany
- Party: Social Democratic Party of Germany (SPD)

Hermann Schulz (24 August 1872 – 20 August 1929) was a German social democratic politician, a member of the Weimar National Assembly and the Weimar German parliament.

Schulz was born in Elbing, West Prussia (Elbląg, Poland). He was trained as a metal worker and worked as a lathe operator in Berlin from 1900 to 1911. He moved back to Elbing in 1911 where he worked for the German Metal Workers' Union. During World War I Schulz served in the German Army from 2 August 1914 to 2 December 1918. On 1 December 1919 he became secretary of the Social Democratic Party in Elbing and from 1 July 1921 on he held the same position in Königsberg in East Prussia. He served as a member of the town council of Elbing from 1913 to 1919 and was elected a member of the Weimar National Assembly on 19 January 1919 representing East Prussia. From December 1923 until his death in 1929 he was a member of the Weimar German parliament.
