= Agnes Neuhaus =

German social worker and politician (1854–1944)

Member of the Reichstag
- In office 1920–1930
- Constituency: Westphalia South

Member of the Weimar National Assembly
- In office 1919–1920
- Constituency: Arnsberg

Personal details
- Born: 24 March 1854 Dortmund, Province of Westphalia, Kingdom of Prussia
- Died: 20 November 1944 (aged 90) Soest, Germany

Agnes Neuhaus (24 March 1854 – 20 November 1944) was a German social worker and politician. In 1919 she was one of the 36 women elected to the Weimar National Assembly, the first female parliamentarians in Germany. She remained a member of parliament until 1930.

== Biography ==
Neuhaus was born Agnes Morsbach in Dortmund in 1854, the daughter of the physician Franz Morsbach and his wife Florentine (née Riesberg). Her father later became a city councillor in Dortmund and chaired the local physician's association and the Arnsberg district medical association. Her mother was a well-known French teacher, but stopped teaching after the birth of her third child. She headed a Catholic women's organisation, chaired the municipal childcare association and organised Sunday classes to train kindergarten teachers. Agnes attended Volksschule and Lyceum in Dortmund, before becoming a pupil at a boarding school in Haselünne between 1866 and 1869 and then in Carignan in France from 1869 to 1870. However, her studies were interrupted by the Franco-Prussian War. She studied music in Berlin in 1877–1878, but married court assessor Adolf Neuhaus before completing her exams. The couple had three children and Adolf became a district judge in Dortmund in 1890; he died in 1905.

From 1899 Neuhaus was involved in poor relief in Dortmund, founding the 'Good Shepherd' organisation, which helped free girls and young women from prostitution. In 1903 she brought together twelve organisations founded across Westphalia to form the 'Association of the Good Shepherd'. In the same year the association established the 'Vincenzheim', a refuge for women in Dortmund. The association later became the 'Catholic Welfare Association for Girls, Women and Children' and then the Catholic Women's Social Service. She became head of the Central Association of Catholic Welfare Associations, which she led until 1944. She was also a member of the central committee of the Catholic German Women's Association and a member of the Reich Commission of the General Welfare Education Day. In 1916 she founded a welfare school.

In 1919 she was elected to the Weimar National Assembly from the Arnsberg constituency as a representative of the Centre Party. She became a board member of the Westphalian branch of the party the same year and was re-elected from the Westphalia South constituency in 1920 Reichstag elections, remaining a member of parliament until 1930. From 1925 onwards she was also a member of the party's national board.

In 1943 she moved from Dortmund to Cappenberg and later to Soest, where she died the following year.
