= Christine Teusch =

German politician (1888–1968)

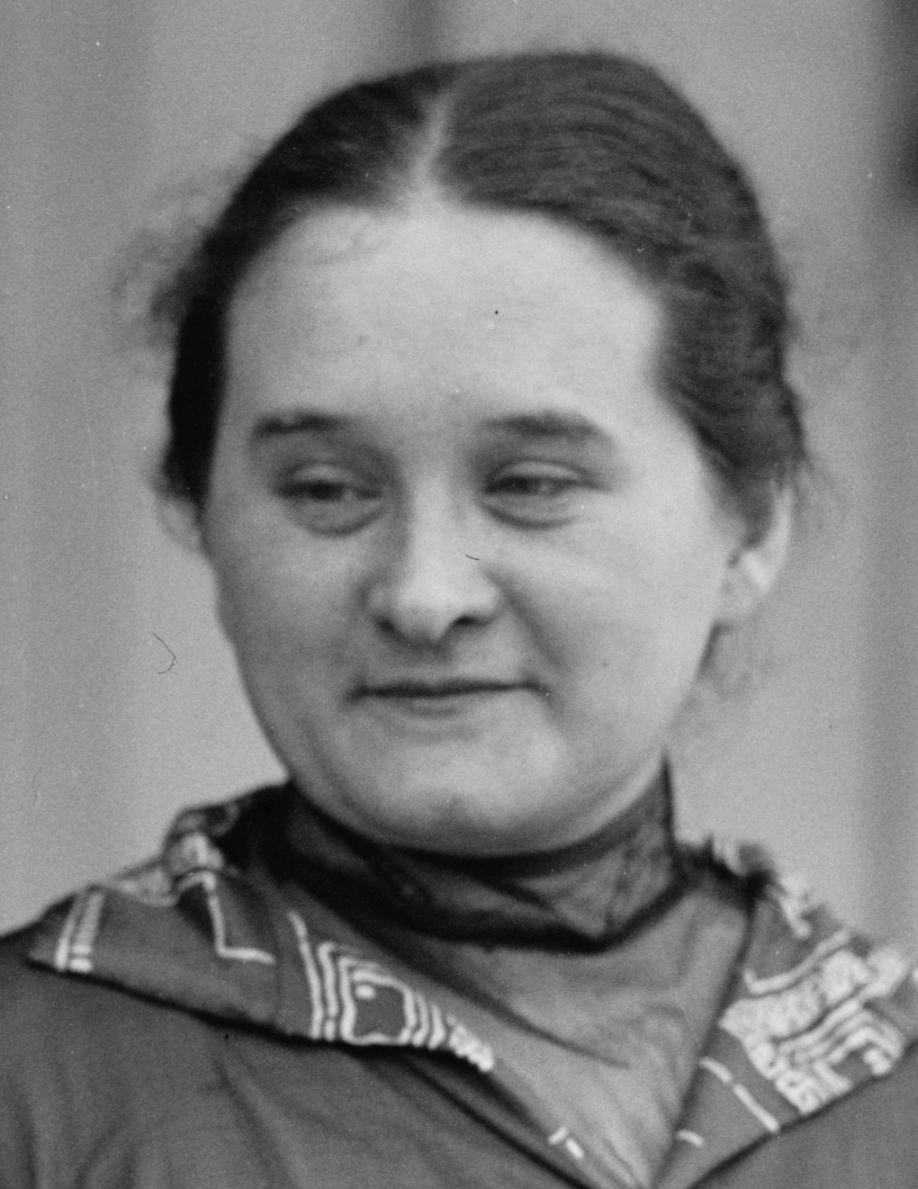
- Teusch in 1925

Member of the Reichstag
- In office 6 February 1919 – 5 March 1933
- Preceded by: Constituency established
- Succeeded by: Constituency abolished
- Constituency: Köln-Aachen

Personal details
- Born: 11 October 1888 Cologne, Prussia, German Empire (now North Rhine-Westphalia, Germany)
- Died: 24 October 1968 (aged 80)
- Party: Christian Democratic Union (from 1945)
- Other political affiliations: Centre Party (until 1945)

Christine Teusch (11 October 1888 – 24 October 1968) was a German politician of the Centre Party and the Christian Democratic Union.

From 1947 to 1954 Teusch was Minister of Education of the German state of North Rhine-Westphalia, having been the first female minister in German history.

She is credited with rebuilding the German education system after the Second World War.

== Biography ==
Teusch qualified as a teacher in 1910 and a rector in 1913. In 1915 she became chairwoman of the Katholischen Lehrerinnenverein ("Catholic Women Teacher's Association") in Cologne. By 1918 she was head of the Women Workers' Secretariat at the Generalsekretariat der Christlichen Gewerkschaften ("General Secretariat of Christian Trade Unions") in Cologne. After the Nazi takeover in 1933 she returned to school, but retired on health grounds in 1936.

She joined the Catholic resistance group Kölner Kreis ("Cologne Cross"). Under the Nazis, she found refuge in the Olper Franziskanerinnen Franciscan Hospital in Arnsberg-Hüsten and lived there incognito.

From 1923 to 1965, she was the chairwomen of the German National Association of Catholic Girls' Protection Societies in Freiburg im Breisgau. Her grave is in the Melaten Cemetery in Köln-Lindenthal.

== Offices ==
Teusch was a member of the Centre Party from Imperial times until 1945. In 1945 she joined the Christian Democratic Union, and was elected party leader for the British occupation zone after the Second World War.

In 1919 she became the youngest member of the Weimar National Assembly and from 1920 to 1933 had a seat in the Reichstag. She was elected to the Landtag of North Rhine-Westphalia after the war, from 1947 to 1966. She was appointed Minister of Culture of North Rhine-Westphalia on 19 December 1947, which post she retained until she retired from it in 1954. While in office, Teusch also contributed to the re-establishment of the Studienstiftung and the German Academic Exchange Service.

== Honours ==
On 7 September 1956, she was the first woman to receive the Große Verdienstkreuz mit Stern und Schulterband des Bundesverdienstkreuzes (literally, "Great Cross of Merit with Star and Sash of the Federal Cross of Merit"). The University of Cologne made her an honorary fellow. Several streets and squares, especially in North Rhine-Westphalia, are named after her.

== Selected publications ==
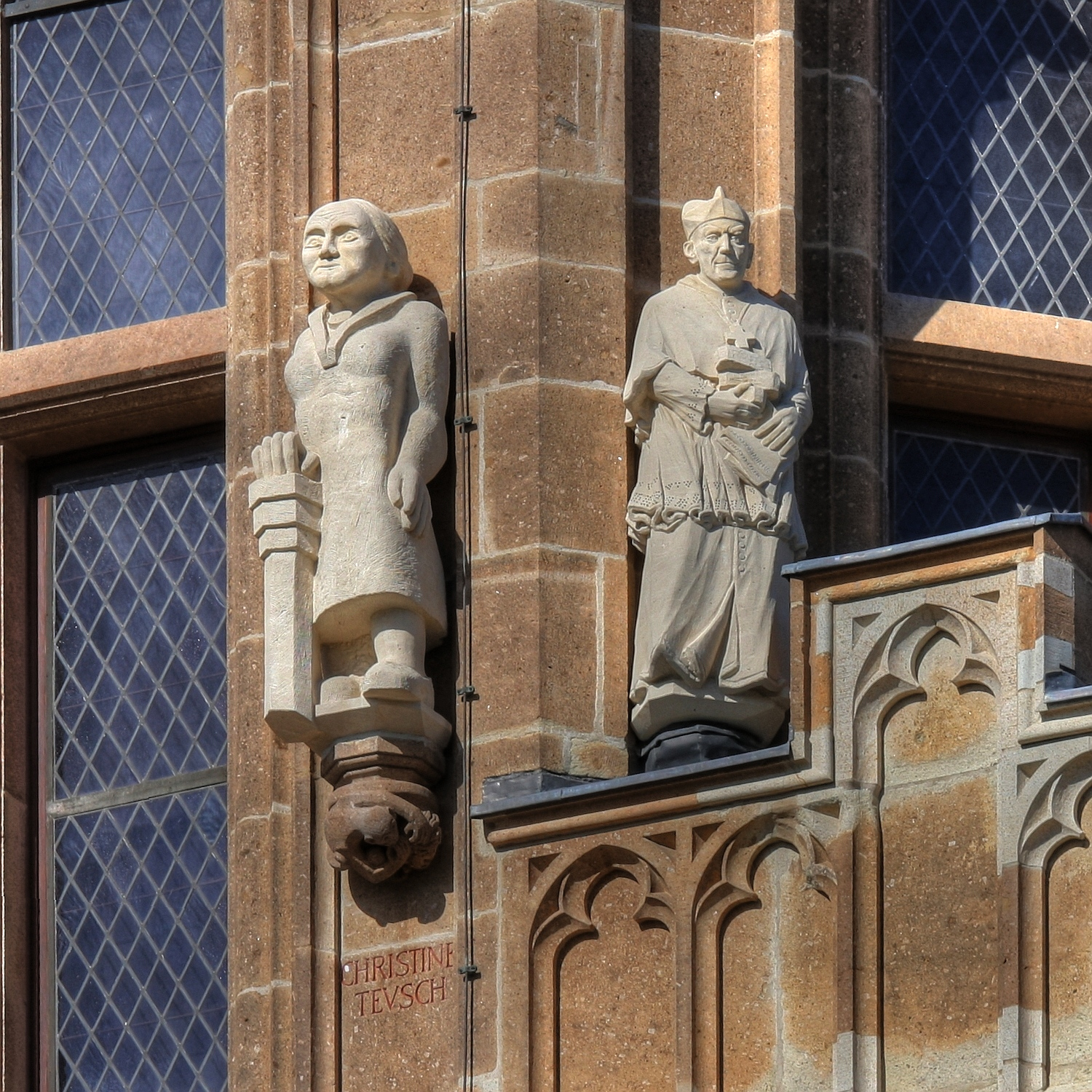
Teusch memorialized in the architectural sculpture of the restored tower of the Cologne City Hall

Translator's note: These are in German.

- Fürsorge des Zentrums für Schwache und Hilfsbedürftige ("Welfare from the Centre for the Weak and Needy"), Berlin 1924.
- Die christliche Frau im politischen Zeitgeschehen ("The Christian Woman in Current Affairs"), Dortmund 1946.
- Das christliche Bildungsideal ("The Christian Ideal of Education"), in: Politisches Jahrbuch der CDU/CSU, hrsg. vom Generalsekretariat der Arbeitsgemeinschaft der CDU/CSU für Deutschland, 1. Jahrgang, Frankfurt 1950.

== Sources ==
- Gabriele Kranstedt: "Katholische Mädchensozialarbeit". In: Köln seit über 100 Jahren. Gründungsgeschichte. Mit einem Vorwort von Anni Jülich. Hrsg. von IN VIA Verband Katholischer Mädchensozialarbeit Köln e.V. Köln 2001, 24 S.
- Gerold Schmidt: "100 Jahre IN VIA Verband Katholischer Mädchensozialarbeit in Köln". In: not-wendig. Katholische Mädchensozialarbeit Köln 1898–1998. Mit einem Vorwort von Anni Jülich und Sibylle Klings. Hrsg. von IN VIA Verband Katholischer Mädchensozialarbeit e.V. Köln. Köln 1998, 35 S.
