= Hedwig Dransfeld =

German politician

Hedwig Dransfeld (24 February 1871 – 13 March 1925) was a German Catholic feminist, writer and member of parliament.

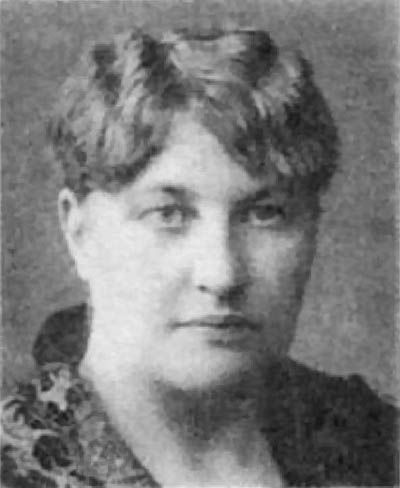
Hedwig Dransfeld

== Biography ==
Hedwig Dransfeld was born in Hacheney (now Dortmund), Germany, to the Romberg family (German aristocrats). Her father, Clemens Dransfeld, was a senior forester, and her mother, Elise Fleischhauer, was a doctor's daughter and a Catholic. Dransfeld's father died when she was three, and her mother died five years later. She was brought up by her maternal grandmother until she, too, died, at which point Dransfeld was placed in an orphanage.

At the age of sixteen she began to train at the Königlichen Katholischen Lehrerinnen-Seminar ("German Catholic Teachers' Seminar") in Paderborn. During her training, she contracted a form of tuberculosis that entered her bones, and lost her left arm and a heel. Despite this she passed her exams with distinction in 1890 and began a teaching career that culminated in her appointment as headmistress of the Ursuline School in Werl.

She began to write and published books of poetry. Later she wrote for Die christliche Frau ("the Christian Woman"), a German newspaper, and in 1905 took over the editorship of that journal and made it an organ of the Katholischen Deutschen Frauenbunds ("Catholic German Women's Federation", abbreviated KDF).

After women were admitted to universities in Germany, in 1908, Dransfield studied Kulturwissenschaft ("Cultural Studies") in Münster and, later, Bonn.

In January 1912, she made a noted speech on women in the church and religious life at the first German Women's Congress at the Reichstag in Berlin. The Berlin Vorwärts (a Social-Democratic newspaper) described her as "the most important woman alive today", and in October 1912 she gave up her work as a teacher to become full-time chairman of the KDF.

After the November revolution, Dransfeld was nominated for Zentrum für die Weimarer Nationalversammlung ("Centre for the Weimar Republic National Assembly") and Preußischen Landesversammlung ("Prussian National Assembly"). She played a major part of the new social legislation, and from 1920 until her death was a senior member of the Rheinischen Zentrumspartei ("Rhenish Centre Party"). She was also appointed Chairman of the Reich Women's advisory board of that party. In 1922 she retired from chairing the KDF on health grounds, but remained a member of the Reichstag.

She died in the Ursuline Convent, and her grave is in a cemetery in Werl.

== Honours ==
Dransfeld received the freedom of the City of Werl on her 50th birthday. A school for disabled students is named after her, and on 10 November 1988 her life was commemorated on a postage stamp. Streets in Munich, Werl and in Bonn are named after her.

== Selected publications ==
- "Wie das Grafendorli glücklich wird. Erzählung für junge Mädchen". In: Bachems illustrierte Erzählungen für Mädchen. 7, Bachem, Köln 1920.
- Der gute Ton für die heranwachsende Jugend. Thiemann, Hamm 1930.
- Il Santo. Erzählungen und Gedichte für alle Verehrer des Hl. Antonius von Padua. Junfermann, Paderborn 1902.
- "Theo Westerholt. Erzählung aus der Zeit Albrecht Dürers". In: Aus allen Zeiten und Ländern. 18, Bachem, Köln 1913.
- "Die Geschwister di Mona Rosta. Erzählung aus dem 17. Jahrhundert". In: Bachems illustrierte Erzählungen für Mädchen. 13, Bachem, Köln 1920.

== Sources ==
- Walter Gronemann: "Dransfeld, Hedwig". In: Hans Bohrmann (Ed.): Biographien bedeutender Dortmunder. Menschen in, aus und für Dortmund. 1, Ruhfus, Dortmund 1994, S. 24ff.
- Marianne Pünder: "Hedwig Dransfeld". In: Aloys Böhmer (Ed.): Westfälische Lebensbilder, XII, Aschendorff, Münster 1979, ISBN 3-402-05951-7.
