= Politics of the United Arab Emirates =

Politics of the United Arab Emirates take place in a framework of a federal presidential elective semi-constitutional monarchy (a federation of absolute monarchies). The United Arab Emirates (UAE) is a federation of seven constituent emirates: Abu Dhabi, Ajman, Dubai, Fujairah, Ras Al Khaimah, Sharjah, and Umm Al Quwain.

According to convention, the ruler of Abu Dhabi is the president of the United Arab Emirates (although called president, the UAE is considered a monarchy since formally, the holder of the position is selected from among the emirs) and the head of state, and the ruler of Dubai is the prime minister of the United Arab Emirates, the head of the government. Within the UAE, emirates have considerable administrative autonomy within themselves.

The UAE is an authoritarian state. The UAE has been described as a "tribal autocracy" where the seven constituent monarchies are led by tribal rulers in an autocratic fashion. There are no democratically elected institutions, and there is no formal commitment to free speech.

The discovery of oil in Abu Dhabi in 1958 and the country's subsequent oil wealth has defined its politics and economy, as well as shaped its foreign policy behavior.

== Overview ==
Administratively, the UAE is a federation of seven emirates, each with its own ruler. The pace of local government reform in each emirate is set primarily by the ruler. Under the provisional constitution of 1971, each emirate reserves considerable powers, including control over mineral rights (notably oil) and revenues. In this milieu, federal powers have developed slowly as each Emirate already had its own existing institutions of government prior to the country's official foundation. The Constitution of the United Arab Emirates separates powers into executive, legislative, and judicial branches. Additionally, legislative and executive powers are divided into federal and emirate jurisdictions.

The constitution of the United Arab Emirates established the Federal Supreme Council, a body that includes the seven rulers and also has an elected chairman and vice chairman each serving five-year terms; the positions of president (chief of state) and vice president, elected by the Federal Supreme Council from within; a Council of Ministers (cabinet), led by a prime minister (head of government); a 40-member National Assembly (known as the Federal National Council), a consultative body whose members are partially appointed by the emirate rulers and partially elected; and an independent judiciary, which includes the Federal Supreme Court. Zayed bin Sultan Al Nahyan was president of the UAE from its foundation until his death on November 2, 2004. His oldest son, Khalifa bin Zayed Al Nahyan, was president until his death May 13, 2022. On 14 May 2022, Sheikh Mohamed bin Zayed Al Nahyan was elected as the UAE's new president after the death of Sheikh Khalifa bin Zayed Al Nahyan.

Under federal authority, responsibilities include foreign affairs, security and defense, nationality and immigration issues, education, public health, currency, postal, telephone and other communications services, air traffic control, licensing of aircraft, labour relations, banking, delimitation of territorial waters and extradition of criminals. Issues excluded from Articles 120 and 121 of the Constitution are to be under the jurisdiction of respective emirates and are reaffirmed by Article 116 which states that: ‘the emirates shall exercise all powers not assigned to the federation by this Constitution’. This is further reiterated by Article 122, which stated that ‘the emirates shall have jurisdiction in all matters not assigned to the exclusive jurisdiction of the federation, in accordance with the provision of the preceding two articles’.

== Federal Supreme Council ==
The Federal Supreme Council consists of the individual rulers of the seven emirates. The president and vice president are elected by the Supreme Council every five years. Although unofficial, the presidency is de facto hereditary to the Al Nahyan ruling family of Abu Dhabi, and a vice presidential post (along with the prime minister post) is de facto hereditary to the Al Maktoum ruling family of Dubai.

Article 47 of the UAE constitution defines the powers of the council's authority in formulation of general policy; legislation on all matters of state; ratification of federal laws and decrees, including those relating to budget and fiscal matters; ratification of international treaties and agreements; and appointment of the prime minister and Supreme Court judges. Decisions are made by majority vote unless relating to substantive issues which require a two-thirds majority vote (five out of seven rulers), which must include Abu Dhabi and Dubai. The Supreme Council also elects the Council of Ministers, while the 40-member Federal National Council, drawn from all the emirates, reviews proposed laws.

== Council of Ministers (Cabinet) ==
The Cabinet of the United Arab Emirates (also called the Council of Ministers, Arabic: مجلس الوزراء) is a collegial body presided over by the prime minister. It consists of 28 members and is also headed by a prime minister (chosen by the president with consultation of the Supreme Council). The federal cabinet is the executive authority for the federation. Under the supreme control of the president and supreme council, it manages all internal and foreign affairs of the federation under its constitutional and federal laws. The cabinet consists of cabinet's chairman (prime minister of UAE) and two deputies and ministers. The general secretariat shall be handled by the secretary general of the cabinet.

== Federal National Council ==
The Federal National Council (al-Majlis al-Watani al-Ittihadi) is the UAE's legislative body and consists of 40 members. The body only has advisory powers. Twenty of the members are indirectly elected by the hand-picked 33% of Emirati citizens who have voting rights through an electoral college, while the other twenty are appointed by the rulers of each emirate. According to Reuters, "the process of selecting the people who can either elect or be elected is opaque."

Political parties are banned. Al Islah, the only large-scale underground political party, operates underground but is considered a terrorist group by the UAE government since 2014 and has been federally banned since 2011.

The FNC is the main consultative body in the UAE and has both a legislative and supervisory role accorded by the Constitution.

Since the council's inception, the following have been selected as speakers: Thani Abdullah Humaid, Taryam Omran Taryam, Hilal bin Ahmed bin Lootah, Al Haj bin Abdullah Al Muhairbi, Mohammed Khalifa Habtour, Saeed Mohammad Al Gandi, Abdul Aziz Al Ghurair, Mohammad Al-Murr, and Amal Al Qubaisi since 2015.

== Federal Judiciary ==
The Federal Judiciary is a constitutionally completely independent body (under Article 94) and includes the Federal Supreme Court and Courts of First Instance. Supreme Council of Rulers appoints the five judges headed by a president to the Supreme Court. The judges are responsible for deciding if federal laws are constitutional, mediating between inter-emirate disputes. It also possesses the authority to try cases involving cabinet and senior federal officials. Although secular law is applied, the basis of legislation is Sharia (Islamic Law) and involves three of the four schools including (mainly) Maliki, but also the Hanbali and Shafi'i schools.

== Local politics ==
The seven Emirates of the United Arab Emirates: 1. Abu Dhabi 2. Ajman 3. Sharjah 4. Dubai 5. Fujairah 6. Ras Al-Khaimah 7. Umm Al-Quwain

The relative prestige and financial influence of each emirate is reflected in the allocation of positions in the federal government. The ruler of Abu Dhabi, whose emirate is the UAE's major oil producer, is president of the UAE. The ruler of Dubai, which is the UAE's commercial centre and a former oil producer, is vice president and prime minister.

Since achieving independence in 1971, the UAE has worked to strengthen its federal institutions. Nonetheless, each emirate still retains substantial autonomy, and progress toward greater federal integration has slowed in recent years. A basic concept in the UAE government's development as a federal system is that a significant percentage of each emirate's revenues should be devoted to the UAE central budget.

Although complexity of local government differs depending on size and development of each emirate, most (such as Abu Dhabi, Dubai, Sharjah and Ajman) have their own executive councils chaired by their respective rulers and possessing various departments reflective of federal ministries. Various autonomous agencies also exist such as the environment, tourism, culture and health agencies. Some emirates such as Abu Dhabi may also be divided into two municipalities (the Western and Eastern regions) and its main cities of Abu Dhabi and Al Ain are also administered by their own municipalities with a municipal council. Abu Dhabi and Sharjah also have their own national consultative councils with similar local duties and role as the Federal National Council.

It has long been regional tradition for rulers to hold open discussions with their people, be they common, merchants or the elite. Often, this forum is held by the emirate rulers as well as senior family members. This open majlis, or consultation, is held periodically; however, a ruler may also appoint an emir, or wali, to whom concerns may be directed by the general population when necessary. This individual is often considered a leading tribal figure whose trust is placed by his tribe as well as the ruler.

== Criticism ==
According to Jim Krane "The UAE’s rulers now maintain power and legitimacy by giving generous subsidies to their citizens, known as Emiratis, essentially buying their support. The majority is happy with this unspoken bargain, which holds sway in most of the Gulf. The sheikhs get public backing in return for improvements in living standards, including jobs, homes, health care, and education. Tribal autocracy is one of the oldest ways of organizing society and the only form of governance the UAE has ever known.

On 2 April 2021, 91-year-old German philosopher Jürgen Habermas rejected the Sheikh Zayed Book Award worth 750,000 UAE dirhams (approximately $200,000) prize money. Habermas earlier accepted the award, but later called it “a wrong decision,” which he corrected by rejecting it in April 2021. In a critical statement, Habermas cited his previous unawareness of the fact that the awarding institution had close connections with the existing political system of the country, which is a dictatorship as cited in a 2020 report published by Amnesty International.

Menas Associates, a risk analysis firm, published a report highlighting escalating tensions between the UAE and Algeria, which accused the Emirates of collaborating with Morocco and Israel to undermine Algeria’s interest in Western Sahara. The Emirati alliance was also accused of working to destabilize the Sahel region. The association between the UAE, Morocco and Israel was viewed as a part of a broader conspiracy against Algerian interests. In a press conference, Louisa Hanoune accused the UAE of ‘collecting money to arm Morocco’ and using their investments in Algeria. Additionally, the Algerian President Abdelmadjid Tebboune claimed to have evidence proving that the UAE bribed Abdelaziz Bouteflika with around US$300 million for over 15 years in exchange of economic or political benefits. Meanwhile, the Emirati intelligence services claimed to have compromising files on Algeria’s destabilizing activities in Sahel. Algeria requested Kuwait to be a mediator to de-escalate tensions with the UAE.

== Political reform and Arab spring ==
In early 2007, the United Arab Emirates launched the 'UAE Government Strategy' for the years ahead, which covered twenty-one topics in six different sectors including social development, economic development, public sector development, justice and safety, infrastructure and rural areas development. The initiative is meant to reevaluate and advance these sectors towards top global standards by facilitating better continuous cooperation between federal and local governments with increased efficiency, training, Emiratisation, ministry empowerment, upgrading of services, improving civil service and legislation review.

Subsequently, in 2007–2008, Abu Dhabi announced the implementation of its own policy to modernise public administration practices and government performance. Plans for reevaluation were laid out in areas including economy, energy, tourism, health, education, labour, civil services, culture and heritage, good control, urban planning, transport, environment, health and safety, municipal affairs, police and emergency services, electronic government, women and legislative reform. Abu Dhabi hopes advancements towards global standards in these areas will improve the quality of services for its residents as well as attract future investment towards further modernising the Emirate.

As of 2011, the country did not see the type of popular struggle other Arab countries saw during the Arab spring. There were minor protests, during which some people were arrested.

The 2023 international investigation series Abu Dhabi Secrets revealed United Arab Emirates’ influence strategy to spy on citizens of 18 countries in Europe and beyond. Using a Swiss intelligence firm Alp Services the UAE intelligence services received the names of more than 1000 individuals and 400 organizations in 18 European countries, labelling them as part of the Muslim Brotherhood network in Europe.

The Economist Intelligence Unit rated the United Arab Emirates an "authoritarian regime" in 2022.

== International organization affiliations ==
- ABEDA
- AfDB
- AFESD
- AL
- AMF
- BRICS
- CAEU
- ESCWA
- FAO
- G-77
- GCC
- IAEA
- IBRD
- ICAO
- ICRM
- IDA
- IDB
- IFAD
- IFC
- IFRCS
- IHO
- ILO
- IMF
- IMO
- Inmarsat
- Intelsat
- Interpol
- IOC
- ISO (correspondent)
- ITU
- NAM
- OAPEC
- OIC
- OPCW
- OPEC
- United Nations
- UNCTAD
- UNESCO
- UNIDO
- UPU
- WCO
- WHO
- WIPO
- WMO
- WTO

== See also ==
- Fatwa Council (United Arab Emirates)
- Freedom of speech in the United Arab Emirates
