= 2006 Emirati parliamentary election =

- 16, 18 and 20 December 2006
- 20 of the 40 seats in the Federal National Council
- Turnout: 74.40%
Party	Seats
Independents	20
This lists parties that won seats. See the complete results below.
Speaker before	Speaker after
Saeed Mohammad Al Gandi; Independent	Abdul Aziz Al Ghurair; Independent

Parliamentary elections were held for the first time in the United Arab Emirates between 16 and 20 December 2006 to elect half of the 40 members of Federal National Council. Voting took place in Abu Dhabi and Fujairah on 16 December, in Dubai and Ras Al Khaimah on 18 December, and in Sharjah, Ajman and Umm Al Quwain on 20 December.

== Electoral system ==
The 40 members of the Federal National Council consisted of 20 elected members and 20 members appointed by the rulers of each emirate.

The elections were held using electoral colleges, with only 6,595 of more than 300,000 citizens over 18 years allowed to vote, of which 1,163 were women. The electoral college members were chosen by the rulers of the seven emirates.

== Results ==
Only one woman was elected (Amal Al Qubaisi in Abu Dhabi) and eight were amongst the appointed members announced on 4 February 2007. Umm Al Qaiwain was the only emirate without female representation.

Emirate	Members
Abu Dhabi	Ahmed Shabeeb Al Dhaheri
Abu Dhabi	Amal Al Qubaisi
Abu Dhabi	Rashed Musabah Al Kendi Al Murar
Abu Dhabi	Aamer Abdul Jalil Mohamed Al Fahim
Abu Dhabi	Abdulla Nasser bin Huwaileel Al Mansouri
Abu Dhabi	Fatima Al Mazrouei
Abu Dhabi	Mohammed Mohammed Ali Fadel Al Hameli
Abu Dhabi	Mugheer Khamis Al Khaili
Dubai	Abdul Aziz Al Ghurair
Dubai	Jamal Mohd Al Hai
Dubai	Hussain Abdulla Ali Al Shafar
Dubai	Khalid Ali Ahmed bin Zayed
Dubai	Sultan Saqer Al Suwaidi
Dubai	Fatma Al Marri
Dubai	Maysa Ghadeer
Dubai	Najla Faisal Al Awadhi
Sharjah	Hamad Harith Al Midfa
Sharjah	Khalifa Abdulla bin Huwaidan Al Ketbi
Sharjah	Salim Mohamed bin Salim Al Naqbi
Sharjah	Aisha Al Roumi
Sharjah	Obaid Ali bin Butti Al Muhairi
Sharjah	Mohamed Abdulla Ali Saif Al Zaabi
Ras al-Khaimah	Ahmed Mohd Naser Al Khatri
Ras al-Khaimah	Rashed Mohamed Al Sheraiqi
Ras al-Khaimah	Abdul Rahim Abdul Latif Al Shahin
Ras al-Khaimah	Abdulla Ahmed Balhin Al Shehhi
Ras al-Khaimah	Nidal Al Tunaiji
Ras al-Khaimah	Yousef Obaid Al Neaimi
Ajman	Hamad Abdulla Ghulaita Al Ghufli
Ajman	Khaled Hamad Mohammed Abu Shehab
Ajman	Ali Majed Al Matrooshi
Ajman	Alia Al Suwaidi
Fujairah	Ahmed Saeed Abdulla Al Dhanhani
Fujairah	Rawiyah Al Samahi
Fujairah	Saeed Ali Hamad Al Hafri
Fujairah	Sultan Ahmed Abdulla Al Moadhen
Umm al-Quwain	Ali Jasim Ahmed
Umm al-Quwain	Sultan Khalfan Sultan bin Hussain
Umm al-Quwain	Sultan Saif Salim Al Kubaisi
Umm al-Quwain	Yousef Ali Fadil bin Fadil

== Aftermath ==
The newly-elected Federal National Council met for the first time on 12 February 2007, with Abdul Aziz Al Ghurair elected speaker.
