= 2015 Emirati parliamentary election =

- 3 October 2015
- 20 of the 40 seats in the Federal National Council
- Turnout: 35.29% (▲7.54pp)
Party	Seats	+/–
Independents	20	0
This lists parties that won seats. See the complete results below.
Speaker before	Speaker after
Mohammad Al Murr; Independent	Amal Al Qubaisi; Independent

Parliamentary elections were held in the United Arab Emirates on 3 October 2015 to elect 20 of the 40 members of the Federal National Council. The elections took place through an electoral college, which was expanded from 129,274 members in the 2011 elections to 224,279 for the 2015 elections.

== Electoral system ==
At the time of the elections, the 40-member Federal National Council had 20 indirectly elected members and 20 appointed members. The 20 elected members were elected by seven electoral colleges; the colleges of Abu Dhabi and Dubai elected four members, the colleges of Sharjah and Ras Al Khaimah elected three, and the colleges of Ajman, Fujairah and Umm Al Quwain elected two. Only around a third of Emirati citizens (who themselves are around 12% of the country's population) were members of the electoral colleges.

Following changes to the electoral system, the elections were held using single non-transferable vote, meaning voters could only vote for one candidate in their emirate, irrespective of the number of seats. Overseas voting was allowed for the first time and overseas voters were able to vote in UAE embassies.

On election day, 36 voting centers were opened nationwide, nine of which had opened for early voting on 28–30 September. Overseas voters were able to cast their vote for the first time in 94 voting centers in UAE embassies on 20–21 September. Overall 79,157 voters cast their vote, making a turnout of 35.29%.

== Campaign ==
A total of 330 candidates contested the elections, of which 252 were men and 78 women. Campaigning was allowed between 6 and 30 September.

== Results ==
Of the twenty elected members, 19 were men and only one woman, Naama Al Sharhan, who was elected in Ras Al Khaimah. Voter turnout was 35.29%, up from 27.75% in the 2011 elections, and ranged from 70% in Umm Al Quwain to 22.1% in Dubai.

Party	Votes	%	Seats
Independents			20
Total			20
Total votes	79,157	–	
Registered voters/turnout	224,279	35.29	
Source: IPU

=== Elected members ===
Emirate	Elected members	Votes received
Abu Dhabi	Khalifa Al Mazrouei	2,167
Abu Dhabi	Mattar Al Shamsi	1,634
Abu Dhabi	Saeed Al Remeithi	1,597
Abu Dhabi	Saleh Al Ameri	1,382
Dubai	Hamad Al Rahoomi	2,076
Dubai	Marwan bin Ghalita	961
Dubai	Khalid Al Falasi	722
Dubai	Jamal Al Hai	672
Sharjah	Jasim Al Naqbi	787
Sharjah	Salem Al Shamsi	644
Sharjah	Mohammed Al Katbi	519
Ras Al Khaimah	Salem Al Shehhi	2,037
Ras Al Khaimah	Ahmed Al Nuaimi	1,358
Ras Al Khaimah	Naama Al Sharhan	1,004
Ajman	Hamad Al Ghafli	723
Ajman	Salem Abdullah Al Shamsi	458
Fujairah	Mohammed Al Yammahi	912
Fujairah	Ahmed Al Hamoudi	546
Umm Al Quwain	Khalfan Al Ali	381
Umm Al Quwain	Obaid Al Ali	372
Source: The National
