= Nidal Al Tunaiji =

Emirati academic and politician

Member of the Federal National Council
- In office 2007–2011
- In office 2015–
- Constituency: Ras al-Khaimah

Nidal Mohamed bin Shirbak Al Tunaiji (Arabic: نضال محمد بن شرباك الطنيجي) is an Emirati academic and politician. In 2007 she was one of the first group of women to enter the Federal National Council.

== Biography ==
The oldest of nine children, Al Tunaiji was educated in the United States. After earning a doctorate in education leadership, she became an assistant professor in information technology at the United Arab Emirates University.

Following the 2006 parliamentary elections she was one of eight women appointed to the Federal National Council alongside the one elected woman, Amal Al Qubaisi. She left the FNC after the 2011 elections, but was appointed again in 2015 and 2019. She is also currently director general of the Zayed House for Islamic Culture.
