= 2011 Emirati parliamentary election =

- 24 September 2011
- 20 of the 40 seats in the Federal National Council
- Turnout: 27.75% (▼46.65pp)
Party	Seats	+/–
Independents	20	0
This lists parties that won seats. See the complete results below.
Speaker before	Speaker after
Abdul Aziz Al Ghurair; Independent	Mohammad Al Murr; Independent

Parliamentary elections were held in the United Arab Emirates on 24 September 2011 to elect the half of the members of Federal National Council. The elections were held using electoral colleges, which were expanded from around 6,689 members in the 2006 elections to 129,274. However, only 35,877 voters voted, with a voter turnout of 27.75%.

== Electoral college ==
The 2011 parliamentary elections had an expanded electoral college constituting 129,274 members, made up of 46% females and 54% males, of which 35% were younger than 30 years.

== Candidates ==
Nominations of candidates took place between 14 and 17 August. On 20 August 2011, the National Elections Commission announced the preliminary list of candidates, stating that 469 members of the electoral college nominated themselves to be candidates for the parliamentary elections. Of those 469 nominees, 85 were women.

Emirate	Candidates	Female candidates
Abu Dhabi	117	22
Dubai	124	26
Sharjah	94	16
Ras Al Khaimah	60	9
Ajman	34	5
Umm Al Quwain	19	4
Fujairah	21	3
Total	469	85

After last-minute applications were taken into account, the final list included 477 candidates.

== Campaign ==
The campaign period lasted from 4 to 21 September 2011. Some observers called for a delay in the voting process to allow for more time for candidates to campaign.

Candidates were prohibited from using religion in their campaign, and campaign spending was limited to AED 2 million (US$544,400).

== Results ==
Emirate	Elected member	Votes
Abu Dhabi	Salem Al Ameri	2,815
Abu Dhabi	Mohammad Al Ameri	2,380
Abu Dhabi	Mohammad Al Qubaisi	1,199
Abu Dhabi	Ahmad Al Ameri	1,153
Dubai	Hamad Al Rahoumi	1327
Dubai	Marwan Bin Ghulaita	1,195
Dubai	Ahmad Ahli	1,164
Dubai	Rashad Bukhash	1,077
Sharjah	Salem Bin Howayden	805
Sharjah	Ahmad Al Jarwan	766
Sharjah	Musabbah Al Ketbi	652
Ras al-Khaimah	Ahmed Abdullah Al Amash	1,449
Ras al-Khaimah	Saeed Al Khateri	957
Ras al-Khaimah	Faisal Al Tunaiji	717
Ajman	Sultan Al Shamsi	296
Ajman	Abdullah Al Shamsi	287
Fujairah	Ghareeb Al Suraidi	436
Fujairah	Sultan Al Yamahi	396
Umm Al Quwain	Sheikha Al Ari	536
Umm Al Quwain	Obeid Al Alili	332
Source: NEC

=== Turnout by emirate ===
Emirate	Registered	Voted	Turnout
Abu Dhabi	47,444	10,109	21.31
Dubai	37,514	9,268	24.71
Sharjah	13,937	5,890	42.26
Ras Al Khaimah	16,850	5,085	30.18
Umm Al Quwain	3,285	1,796	54.67
Ajman	3,920	1,562	39.85
Fujairah	6,324	2,167	34.27
Total	129,274	35,877	27.75
Source: NEC, NEC

=== Nominated members ===
The appointed members announced were:

- Abu Dhabi:
1. Noura Al Kaabi
2. Sultan Al Daheri
3. Khalifa Al Suwaidi
4. Amal Al Qubaisi
- Dubai:
1. Afra Al Basti
2. Mona Al Bahar
3. Mohammad Al Murr
4. Ahmad Al Mansouri
- Sharjah:
1. Shaikha Al Owais
2. Ahmad Al Zaabi
3. Yaqoub Al Naqbi
- Ras Al Khaimah:
1. Abdul Al Zaabi
2. Rashid Al Shuraiqi
3. Abdul Al Shaheen
- Ajman:
1. Ahmad Al Shamsi
2. Ali Al Nuaimi
- Fujairah:
1. Mohammad Al Raqabani
2. Aisha Al Yamahi
- Umm Al Quwain:
1. Ali Ahmad
2. Humaid Ali

== Aftermath ==
Mohammad Al Murr was elected unopposed as speaker of the Federal National Council.
