= Maysa Ghadeer =

Emirati educator, writer and politician

Member of the Federal National Council
- In office 2007–2011
- Constituency: Dubai

Maysa Rashed Ghadeer (Arabic: ميساء راشد غدير) is an Emirati educator, writer and politician. In 2007 she was one of the first group of women to enter the Federal National Council.

== Biography ==
Ghadeer earned a bachelor's degree in Arabic literature at Al Ain University. She began working as a teacher in 1998, and later became a columnist for the Al Bayan newspaper, before working in the media department of the Dubai government and for Dubai Holding. She married and had a child, but the couple divorced in 2004.

Ghadeer was a candidate in the 2006 parliamentary elections. Although she failed to be elected, she was one of eight women appointed to the Federal National Council alongside the one elected woman, Amal Al Qubaisi. She did not run for re-election in 2011, and subsequently earned a PhD in discourse analysis and worked at Dubai Media.
