= 2019 Emirati parliamentary election =

- 5 October 2019
- 20 of the 40 seats in the Federal National Council
- Turnout: 34.81% (▼0.48pp)
Party	Seats	+/–
Independents	20	0
This lists parties that won seats. See the complete results below.
Speaker before	Speaker after
Amal Al Qubaisi	Saqr Ghobash

Parliamentary elections were held in the United Arab Emirates on 5 October 2019 to elect 20 of the 40 members of the Federal National Council. As there were no political parties at the time of the elections, all candidates ran as independents.

The elections took place through an electoral college, the membership of which was expanded from 224,279 in 2015 to 337,738 in 2019.

== Electoral system ==
The Federal National Council consists of 40 members, 20 of whom are appointed by the rulers of each emirate and 20 are elected by single non-transferable vote in seven electoral colleges based on the emirates. The colleges of Abu Dhabi and Dubai elects four members each, the colleges of Sharjah and Ras al-Khaimah three each, and the colleges of Ajman, Fujairah and Umm al-Quwain two each. Voters can vote for only one candidate in their emirate.

In December 2018, President Khalifa bin Zayed Al Nahyan issued a directive that half the members of the Council should be women.

Under the constitution of the United Arab Emirates, "each emirate shall be free to determine the method of selecting the citizens representing it in the Federal National Council". The rulers of each emirate decides who will be able to vote; the total number of voters has increased at each election, with an objective that all citizens will be able to vote in the future.

On election day, 39 voting centers were opened in the UAE, nine of which had been open for early voting on 1–3 October. Overseas voters were able to vote in UAE embassies on 22 and 23 September.

== Campaign ==
A total of 479 candidates contested the elections.

== Results ==
A total of 117,592 votes were cast, a voter turnout of 34.81%. The number of votes cast increased by 48.5% compared to the 2015 elections.

The UAE has a 50% quota system for women in parliament. Therefore 50% of all parliament seats are reserved for women. As a result of the quota system, seven of the 20 elected members were women, although the sole incumbent elected female MP Naama al-Sharhan failed to win re-election in Ras al-Khaimah. To achieve gender parity, 13 of the 20 appointed members were women.

Party	Votes	%	Seats
Independents			20
Total			20
Total votes	117,592	–	
Registered voters/turnout	337,738	34.82	
Source: The National

=== Elected members ===
Emirate	Elected members	Votes	Notes
Abu Dhabi	Suhail al-Affari	2,624	
Abu Dhabi	Khalfan al-Shamsi	2,495	
Abu Dhabi	Naema al-Mansouri	444	
Abu Dhabi	Moaza al-Amri	370	
Dubai	Hamad al-Rahoumi	1,517	Re-elected
Dubai	Osama al-Shafar	1,032	
Dubai	Mariam Bin Thania	374	
Dubai	Sarah Filknaz	333	
Sharjah	Humaid al-Shamsi	1,227	
Sharjah	Adnan al-Hammadi	985	
Sharjah	Obaid al-Ghoul	947	
Ras al-Khaimah	Yousef al-Shihhi	2,569	
Ras al-Khaimah	Saeed al-Abdi	1,649	
Ras al-Khaimah	Ahmad al-Shihhi	1,501	
Ajman	Ahmad Suwaidi	680	
Ajman	Hind al-Olayli	114	
Fujairah	Mohammed al-Yammahi	2,160	Re-elected
Fujairah	Sabreen al-Yamahi	955	
Umm al-Quwain	Mohammed al-Kashef	919	
Umm al-Quwain	Athra Bin Rakkad	270	
Source: The National
