= 2023 Emirati parliamentary election =

2023 Emirati parliamentary elections
- 7 October 2023
- 20 of the 40 seats in the Federal National Council
- Turnout: 44.00% (▲9.19pp)
Party	Seats	+/–
Independents	20	0
This lists parties that won seats. See the complete results below.
Speaker before	Speaker after
Saqr Ghobash	Saqr Ghobash

Parliamentary elections were held in the United Arab Emirates on 7 October 2023 to elect 20 of the 40 members of the Federal National Council. As political parties are banned in the UAE, all candidates run as independents. The election was the first to be conducted completely electronically; 92.69% of voters chose to vote remotely in the election cycle.

== Electoral system ==
The Federal National Council consists of 40 members, 20 of whom are appointed by the rulers of each emirate and 20 are elected by single non-transferable vote in seven electoral colleges based on the emirates. The colleges of Abu Dhabi and Dubai elect four members each, the colleges of Sharjah and Ras al-Khaimah three each, and the colleges of Ajman, Fujairah and Umm al-Quwain two each. Since the 2019 election, the FNC has a gender quota, requiring 50% of FNC members to be women.

Not all citizens are eligible to vote. Instead, voters are handpicked and chosen through an electoral college, the membership of which was expanded from 337,738 in 2019 to 398,879 in 2023.

== Results ==
Preliminary results were released on 7 October, and certified on 13 October. The national election committees of all emirates, except the committees of Sharjah and Ras al-Khaimah, allocated half of their elected seats to the highest voted for candidates of each gender to meet their gender quotas; the appointed seats for each emirate need to ultimately achieve the quota.

Party	Votes	%	Seats
Independents			20
Total			20
Total votes	175,487	–	
Registered voters/turnout	398,879	44.00	
Source: The National

=== Elected members ===
Emirate	Elected members	Votes	Notes
Abu Dhabi	Salem Al Ameri	4,509	
Abu Dhabi	Hilal Al Kaabi	3,671	
Abu Dhabi	Mudhia Al Menhali	2,448	
Abu Dhabi	Hashima Al Afari	1,769	
Dubai	Humaid Al Tayer	2,426	
Dubai	Ahmed Khoury	1,749	
Dubai	Maryam Majid bin Thaneya	1,064	Re-elected
Dubai	Amna Ali Salem Ali Al Odaidi	617	
Sharjah	Mohammed Al Dhouri	2,489	
Sharjah	Adnan Al Hammadi	2,335	Re-elected
Sharjah	Walid Al Mansouri	2,013	
Ras al-Khaimah	Saeed Al Nuaimi	3,866	
Ras al-Khaimah	Sultan Al Zaabi	3,720	
Ras al-Khaimah	Salem Al Ali	3,513	
Ajman	Majid Al Mazrouei	3,787	
Ajman	Aisha Al Marri	390	
Fujairah	Sheikh Saeed Al Sharqi	8,985	
Fujairah	Aisha Al Dhanhan	1,009	
Umm al-Quwain	Mohammed Al Ali	1,036	
Umm al-Quwain	Mona Al Ali	280	
Source: The National, WAM

=== Voter turnout ===
==== By emirate ====
Emirate	Eligible voters	Votes cast	Turnout
Abu Dhabi	126,779	56,471	44.54%
Dubai	73,181	16,909	23.11%
Sharjah	72,946	29,996	41.11%
Ras al-Khaimah	62,197	35,357	56.85%
Ajman	12,600	7,283	57.80%
Fujairah	43,599	24,911	57.13%
Umm al-Quwain	7,577	4,561	60.20%
Total	398,879	175,488	44.00%
Source: WAM

==== By gender ====
Gender	Eligible voters	% of eligible voters	% of turnout
Male	194,111	48.67%	55.86%
Female	204,768	51.22%	44.14%
Source: WAM
