= Fatma Al Marri =

Emirian politician

Member of the Federal National Council
- In office 2007–2011
- Constituency: Dubai

Fatma Ghanem Khalfan Al Marri is an Emirati educator and politician. In 2007 she was one of the first group of women to enter the Federal National Council.

== Biography ==
Al Marri worked as a teacher, becoming a headteacher. In 2006 she was appointed CEO of the Dubai School Agency in the Knowledge and Human Development Authority.

Following the 2006 parliamentary elections, she was one of eight women appointed to the Federal National Council alongside the one elected woman, Amal Al Qubaisi. She remained in parliament until 2011. In 2010 she was appointed to the board of trustees of Hamdan Bin Mohammed eUniversity and in 2015 became a board member of the Higher Colleges of Technology.
