= Alia Al Suwaidi =

Emirian politician

Member of the Federal National Council
- In office 2007–2011
- Constituency: Ajman

Alia Salem Saeed Al Suwaidi (Arabic: علياء سالم سعيد السويدى) is an Emirati civil servant and politician. In 2007 she was one of the first group of women to enter the Federal National Council.

== Biography ==
Al Suwaidi worked in the Ministry of Health, becoming deputy director for Ajman medical district.

Following the 2006 parliamentary elections she was one of eight women appointed to the Federal National Council alongside the one elected woman, Amal Al Qubaisi.
