= Rawiyah Al Samahi =

Emirati politician

Member of the Federal National Council
- In office 2007–2011
- Constituency: Fujairah

Rawiyah Saif Sultan Saeed Al Samahi (Arabic: روية سيف سلطان سعيد السماحي) is an Emirati politician. In 2007 she was one of the first group of women to enter the Federal National Council.

== Biography ==
After graduating, Al Samahi married and spent two years as a housewife. She then joined the public relations department of the Ministry of Health, and later worked for eleven years in the health education department. She became chief executive of Fujairah Hospital in 1995, remaining in post until 2007.

Following the 2006 parliamentary elections she was one of eight women appointed to the Federal National Council alongside the one elected woman, Amal Al Qubaisi.
