= Aisha Al Roumi =

Emirati doctor and politician

Member of the Federal National Council
- In office 2007–2011
- Constituency: Sharjah

Aisha Mohammad Khalfan Al Roumi (Arabic: عائشة محمد خلفان الرومي) is an Emirati physician and politician. In 2007, she was one of the first group of women to enter the Federal National Council.

A qualified doctor, Al Roumi worked as a paediatrician and became Director of Maternal Child Health for Sharjah in the Ministry of Health.

Following the 2006 parliamentary elections, she was one of eight women appointed to the Federal National Council alongside the one elected woman, Amal Al Qubaisi. She became chair of the Pensions Committee and sat on the Health, Labour and Social Affairs Committee Committee.
