= Embassy of the United Arab Emirates, Ankara =

Diplomatic mission of the United Arab Emirates to Turkey

Embassy of the United Arab Emirates in Ankara
- Emblem of the United Arab Emirates
- Location: Ankara, Turkey
- Address: Doğukent Bulvarı, 596.Sok No:5, Sancak Mah., Çankaya
- Coordinates: 39°53′30.6″N 32°51′50.4″E
- Ambassador: Saeed Thani Hareb Al Dhaheri (since December 2021)
- Website: www.mofa.gov.ae/missions/ankara

The Embassy of the United Arab Emirates in Ankara is the diplomatic mission of the United Arab Emirates (UAE) to the Republic of Turkey. It is located at Doğukent Bulvarı, 596.Sok No:5, Sancak Mah., Çankaya, Ankara.

His Excellency Saeed Thani Hareb Al Dhaheri is the current ambassador, a post held since December 2021.

== History ==
The UAE established its embassy in Ankara in 1983, marking the beginning of formal diplomatic relations between the two nations. In addition to the embassy, the UAE also maintains a consulate-general in Istanbul, which opened in 1989.

== Ambassador ==
His Excellency Saeed Thani Hareb Al Dhaheri presented his credentials to Recep Tayyip Erdoğan, the president of Turkey in December 2021. Prior to his appointment in Turkey, Ambassador Al Dhaheri held various other positions.

== See also ==
- Foreign relations of the United Arab Emirates
- Foreign relations of Turkey
- List of diplomatic missions of the United Arab Emirates
- List of diplomatic missions in Turkey
