= Fatima Al Mazrouei =

United Arab Emirates diplomat

Fatima Khamis Salem Khalfan Al Mazrouei is a diplomat from the United Arab Emirates. Ambassador Fatema Al Mazroeui made history when she became the United Arab Emirate's first female diplomat.

On January 12, 2017, she became the first female Ambassador to Denmark from the UAE. In 2006 she was in one of the first groups of women to be allowed entry into the Federal National Council, when she was appointed to the legislature. She is the UAE Ambassador to The Kingdom of Norway and presented her credentials to the Norwegian King Harald in January 2023.

== Education ==
- Master of Comparative Regional Studies American University 2008
- BA in Hebrew Language and Literature from Ain Shams University - 1999
- Course from the Diplomatic Institute, Ministry of Foreign Affairs - United Arab Emirates
