= Najla Faisal Al Awadhi =

Emirati politician

Najla Faisal Al Awadhi is a former Member of Parliament (the Federal National Council) of the United Arab Emirates and a distinguished media pioneer in the Middle East. Al Awadhi is one of the first women in the history of the UAE to become a Member of the UAE Parliament and also the first Arab woman to hold a chief executive post in a state run media organization.

== Life ==
During Al Awadhi's four-year parliament term she served on the Education, Youth, Media and Culture Committees; as well as the Parliamentary Steering Committee established to develop a scheme to modernize the Parliament's practices and overall effectiveness. She also previously served on the Foreign Affairs, Planning, Petroleum, Mineral Wealth, Agriculture and Fishery Committees. Al Awadhi was also previously a Chief Executive at Dubai Media Incorporated (DMI). In 2011, Al Awadhi was selected as one of the ‘500 Most Influential Muslims’ by the Royal Islamic Strategic Studies Center in Jordan. She is a member of the World Economic Forum’s Young Global Leaders and also a member of the Global Agenda Councils of the World Economic Forum. In addition, Al Awadhi was acting chairperson for the regional board of Young Arab Leaders (YAL). Previously, she was also on the Advisory Board of the University of Southern California’s Center on Public Diplomacy, and a board member with YAL's UAE Chapter and headed its Education initiative that sought to provide higher education opportunities to talented UAE nationals. Since 2007, Al Awadhi has been a regular columnist for local newspapers in the UAE. Her articles cover a range of socio-economic topics, including women's rights, democracy, social justice, cultural perspectives, and education challenges throughout the Middle East.

Al Awadhi is a graduate of Harvard University's Kennedy School of Government.
