= Embassy of the United Arab Emirates, Moscow =

Diplomatic mission of the United Arab Emirates to Russia

Embassy of the United Arab Emirates in Moscow
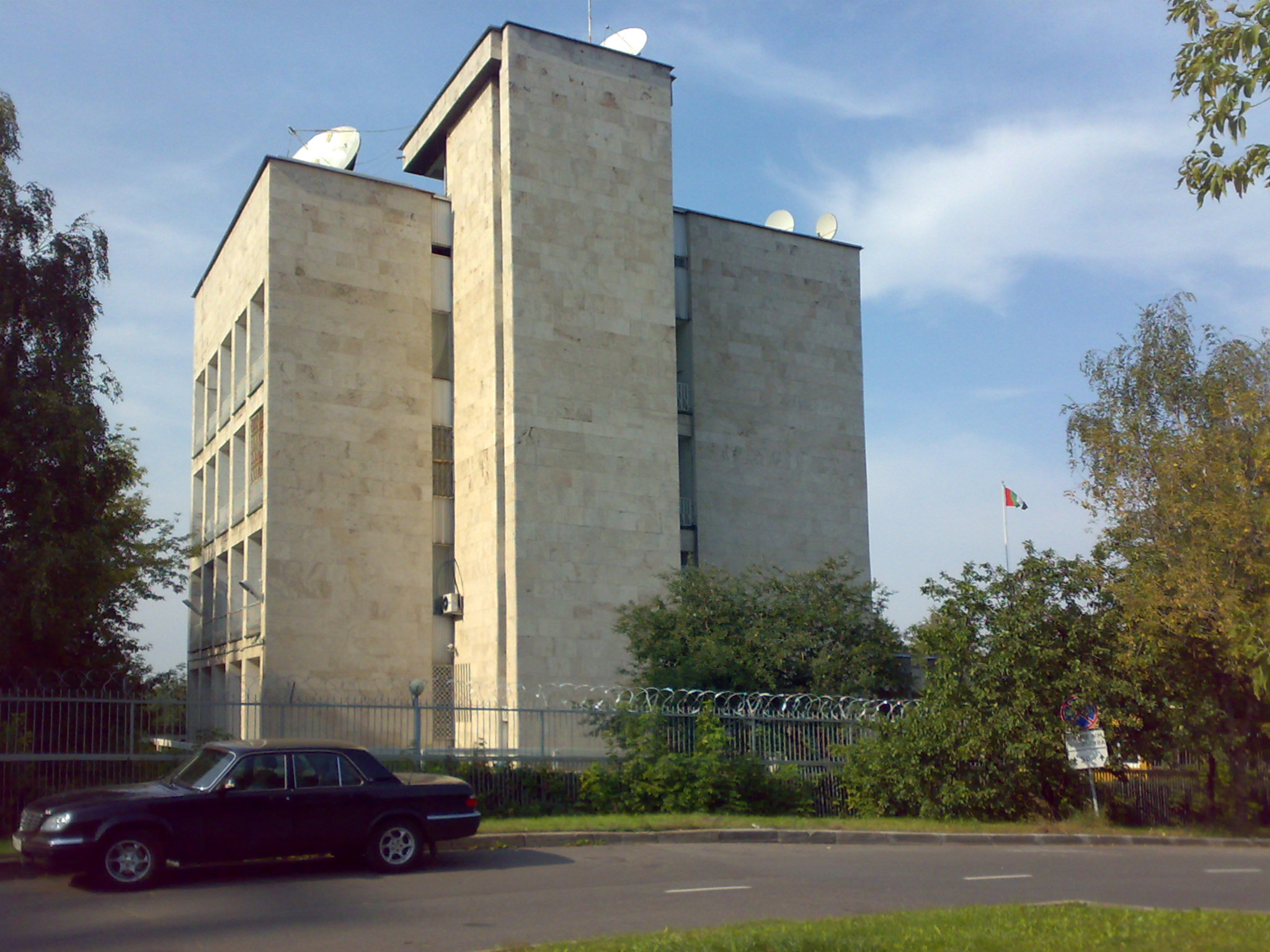
- Embassy of the UAE in Moscow
- Location: Moscow, Russia
- Address: Ulitsa Pogodinskaya 12, Moscow, Russia
- Coordinates: 55°43′6.9″N 37°30′50.4″E
- Ambassador: Mohamed Ahmed Al Jaber (since November 2020)
- Website: www.mofa.gov.ae/missions/moscow

The Embassy of the United Arab Emirates in Moscow is the diplomatic mission of the United Arab Emirates (UAE) to the Russian Federation. It is located at 4, Ulof Palme St., in the Khamovniki District of central Moscow.

His Excellency Mohamed Ahmed Al Jaber is the current ambassador, a post held since November 2020.

== History ==
The Soviet Union and UAE established diplomatic relations on 8 December 1971. In 1986, the Soviet embassy in Abu Dhabi was opened and the UAE embassy in Moscow was opened in 1987.

== Ambassador ==
On 25 November 2020, His Excellency Mohamed Ahmed Al Jaber presented his credentials to Vladimir Putin, the Russian president. Before his current post, ambassador Al Jaber served in various diplomatic roles, including as the UAE ambassador to the Republic of Tajikistan from 2017 to 2020.

== See also ==
- Foreign relations of the United Arab Emirates
- Foreign relations of Russia
- List of diplomatic missions of the United Arab Emirates
- List of diplomatic missions in Russia
