= Embassy of the United Arab Emirates, Islamabad =

Embassy of the United Arab Emirates, Islamabad
- Location: Islamabad, Pakistan
- Address: Diplomatic Enclave, Plot No. 1-22, P.O. Box 1111
- Ambassador: Hamad Obaid Al Zaabi
- Jurisdiction: Islamabad
- Website: Embassy of the United Arab Emirates, Islamabad

The Embassy of the United Arab Emirates, Islamabad (Arabic: سفارة دولة الامارات العربية المتحدة في باكستان) is a diplomatic mission of the United Arab Emirates in Islamabad, Pakistan. It is located inside the Diplomatic Enclave in Islamabad. The present UAE ambassador to Pakistan is Hamad Obaid Al Zaabi. The UAE also has a Consulate-General in Karachi.

== See also ==
- Pakistan–United Arab Emirates relations
- List of diplomatic missions of the United Arab Emirates
- List of diplomatic missions in Pakistan
