= Saqr Ghobash =

Emirati politician

- صقر غباش
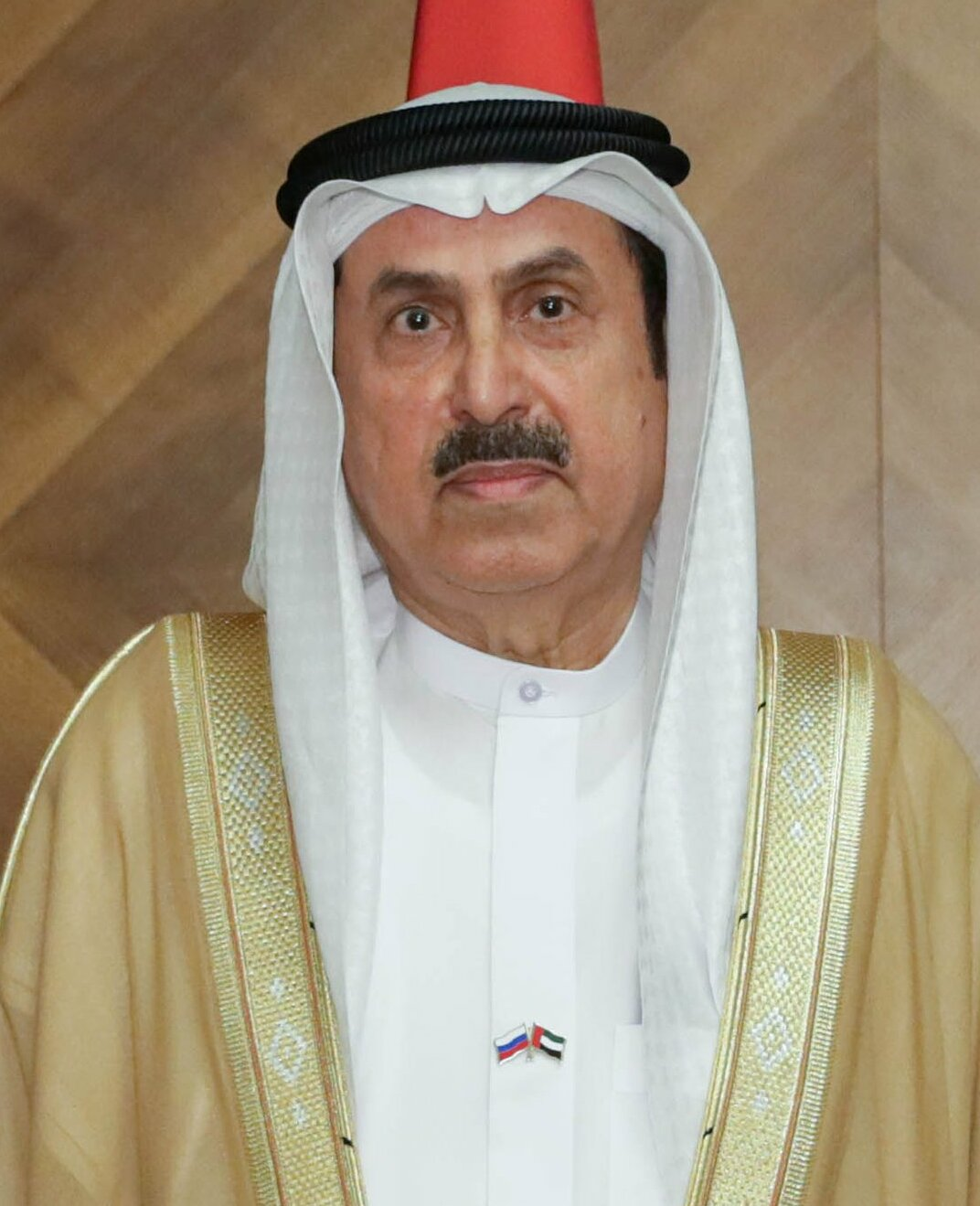
- Ghobash in 2021

President of the Federal National Council
- Incumbent
- Assumed office 14 November 2019
- Preceded by: Amal Al Qubaisi

Personal details
- Born: 1952 (age 73–74) Ras Al Khaimah, United Arab Emirates
- Education: UAE University

Saqr Ghobash (born 1952) is an Emirati politician. He has been President of the Federal National Council since 2019. Previously he served as minister of labor and UAE ambassador to USA.

He graduated from the Police Academy in Sudan in 1973, and he graduated from the UAE University in 1986 with a degree in Management.

He was a member of the Cosmos Club in Washington DC.

== Positions ==
He held several positions, the most important of which are:

- Chairman of the Board of Directors of the National Media Council (2008-2010)
- UAE Ambassador to the United States - Washington (2005-2008)
- Non-Resident Ambassador of the United Arab Emirates to Mexico (2005-2008)
- Undersecretary of the Ministry of Culture and Information (1998-2005)
- Undersecretary of the Ministry of Interior (1991-1998)
- Director General of the Police College - Abu Dhabi (1984 "Year of Establishment" - 1991)
- Vice President of the UAE Football Association (1986-1990) (1996-1998)
- Director General of Administrative and Financial Affairs at the Ministry of Interior (1976-1983)
