= List of diplomatic missions of the United Arab Emirates =

This is a list of diplomatic missions of the United Arab Emirates, excluding honorary consulates.

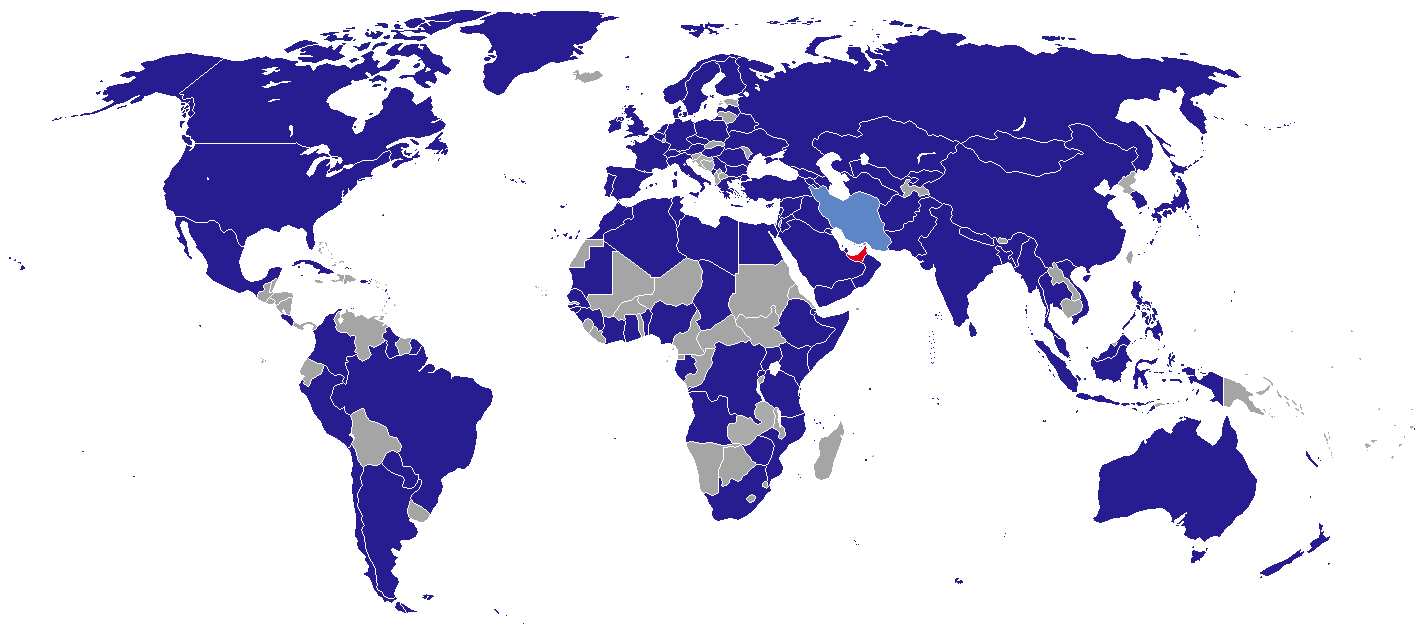
Map of Emirati diplomatic missions

== Current missions ==
=== Africa ===
Host country	Host city	Mission	Concurrent accreditation	Ref.
Angola	Luanda	Embassy	Countries: São Tomé and Príncipe	
Benin	Cotonou	Embassy		
Chad	N'Djamena	Embassy	Countries: Central African Republic; Niger	
Comoros	Moroni	Embassy		
Congo-Kinshasa	Kinshasa	Embassy		
Djibouti	Djibouti City	Consulate-General		
Egypt	Cairo	Embassy	Multilateral Organizations: Arab League	
Ethiopia	Addis Ababa	Embassy	Countries: South Sudan; Multilateral Organizations: African Union	
Gabon	Libreville	Embassy		
Ghana	Accra	Embassy		
Guinea	Conakry	Embassy	Countries: Equatorial Guinea; Liberia	
Guinea-Bissau	Bissau	Embassy		
Ivory Coast	Abidjan	Embassy		
Kenya	Nairobi	Embassy	Countries: Madagascar; Multilateral Organizations: United Nations	
Libya	Tripoli	Embassy	Countries: Burkina Faso; Mali	
Mauritania	Nouakchott	Embassy		
Morocco	Rabat	Embassy		
Morocco	Laayoune	Consulate-General		
Mozambique	Maputo	Embassy	Countries: Eswatini; Mauritius	
Nigeria	Abuja	Embassy	Countries: Cameroon	
Nigeria	Lagos	Consulate-General	Countries: Cameroon	
Rwanda	Kigali	Embassy		
Senegal	Dakar	Embassy	Countries: Cape Verde; Gambia; Sierra Leone	
Seychelles	Victoria	Embassy		
Somalia	Mogadishu	Embassy		
South Africa	Pretoria	Embassy	Countries: Botswana; Lesotho; Namibia	
Tanzania	Dar es Salaam	Embassy	Countries: Malawi	
Tanzania	Zanzibar City	Consulate-General	Countries: Malawi	
Togo	Lomé	Embassy		
Tunisia	Tunis	Embassy		
Uganda	Kampala	Embassy	Countries: Burundi	
Zambia	Lusaka	Embassy		
Zimbabwe	Harare	Embassy		

=== Americas ===
Host country	Host city	Mission	Concurrent accreditation	Ref.
Argentina	Buenos Aires	Embassy	Countries: Uruguay	
Brazil	Brasília	Embassy	Countries: Suriname	
Brazil	São Paulo	Consulate-General	Countries: Suriname	
Canada	Ottawa	Embassy		
Chile	Santiago de Chile	Embassy		
Colombia	Bogotá	Embassy	Countries: Nicaragua; Panama	
Costa Rica	San José	Embassy	Countries: Honduras	
Cuba	Havana	Embassy	Countries: Antigua and Barbuda; Bahamas; Dominica; Dominican Republic; Haiti; Jamaica; Saint Kitts and Nevis; Saint Lucia; Saint Vincent and the Grenadines; Trinidad and Tobago; International Organizations: Association of Caribbean States	
Guyana	Georgetown	Embassy		
Mexico	Mexico City	Embassy	Countries: Belize; El Salvador; Guatemala	
Paraguay	Asunción	Embassy		
Peru	Lima	Embassy	Countries: Bolivia; Ecuador	
United States	Washington, D.C.	Embassy		
United States	Boston	Consulate-General		
United States	Houston	Consulate-General		
United States	Los Angeles	Consulate-General		
United States	Miami	Consulate-General		
United States	New York City	Consulate-General		

=== Asia ===
Host country	Host city	Mission	Concurrent accreditation	Ref.
Afghanistan	Kabul	Embassy		
Armenia	Yerevan	Embassy		
Azerbaijan	Baku	Embassy		
Bahrain	Manama	Embassy		
Bangladesh	Dhaka	Embassy		
China	Beijing	Embassy		
China	Guangzhou	Consulate-General		
China	Hong Kong	Consulate-General		
China	Shanghai	Consulate-General		
Georgia	Tbilisi	Embassy		
India	New Delhi	Embassy	Countries: Bhutan	
India	Hyderabad	Consulate-General	Countries: Bhutan	
India	Mumbai	Consulate-General	Countries: Bhutan	
India	Thiruvananthapuram	Consulate-General	Countries: Bhutan	
Indonesia	Jakarta	Embassy	Countries: Timor-Leste	
Iran	Bandar Abbas	Consulate-General		
Iraq	Baghdad	Embassy		
Iraq	Erbil	Consulate-General		
Israel	Tel Aviv	Embassy		
Japan	Tokyo	Embassy		
Jordan	Amman	Embassy	Countries: Palestine	
Kazakhstan	Astana	Embassy		
Kuwait	Kuwait City	Embassy		
Kyrgyzstan	Bishkek	Embassy		
Lebanon	Beirut	Embassy		
Malaysia	Kuala Lumpur	Embassy	Countries: Brunei	
Maldives	Malé	Embassy		
Mongolia	Ulaanbaatar	Embassy		
Myanmar	Yangon	Embassy		
Nepal	Kathmandu	Embassy		
Oman	Muscat	Embassy		
Pakistan	Islamabad	Embassy		
Pakistan	Karachi	Consulate-General		
Palestine	Ramallah	Representative Office		
Philippines	Manila	Embassy	Countries: Palau	
Qatar	Doha	Embassy		
Saudi Arabia	Riyadh	Embassy	Multilateral Organizations: Organisation of Islamic Cooperation	
Saudi Arabia	Jeddah	Consulate-General	Multilateral Organizations: Organisation of Islamic Cooperation	
Singapore	Singapore	Embassy	Countries: Papua New Guinea	
South Korea	Seoul	Embassy		
Sri Lanka	Colombo	Embassy		
Syria	Damascus	Embassy		
Tajikistan	Dushanbe	Embassy		
Thailand	Bangkok	Embassy	Countries: Cambodia	
Turkey	Ankara	Embassy		
Turkey	Istanbul	Consulate-General		
Turkmenistan	Ashgabat	Embassy		
Uzbekistan	Tashkent	Embassy		
Vietnam	Hanoi	Embassy	Countries: Laos	
Yemen	Aden	Embassy		

=== Europe ===
Host country	Host city	Mission	Concurrent accreditation	Ref.
Austria	Vienna	Embassy	Countries: Slovakia; Slovenia; International Organizations: International Atomic Energy Agency; United Nations	
Belarus	Minsk	Embassy		
Belgium	Brussels	Embassy	Countries: Luxembourg; International Organizations: European Union	
Bosnia and Herzegovina	Sarajevo	Consulate-General (Note: Subordinate to the embassy in Podgorica.)		
Bulgaria	Sofia	Embassy		
Cyprus	Nicosia	Embassy		
Czechia	Prague	Embassy		
Denmark	Copenhagen	Embassy		
Finland	Helsinki	Embassy	Countries: Estonia	
France	Paris	Embassy	Countries: Monaco	
Germany	Berlin	Embassy	Countries: Croatia	
Germany	Munich	Consulate-General	Countries: Croatia	
Greece	Athens	Embassy	Countries: Albania	
Hungary	Budapest	Embassy		
Ireland	Dublin	Embassy		
Italy	Rome	Embassy	Countries: Malta; North Macedonia; San Marino	
Latvia	Riga	Embassy	Countries: Lithuania	
Montenegro	Podgorica	Embassy	Countries: Bosnia and Herzegovina; Kosovo	
Netherlands	The Hague	Embassy	International Organizations: Organisation for the Prohibition of Chemical Weapons	
Norway	Oslo	Embassy		
Poland	Warsaw	Embassy		
Portugal	Lisbon	Embassy		
Romania	Bucharest	Embassy		
Russia	Embassy	Embassy		
Serbia	Belgrade	Embassy		
Spain	Madrid	Embassy	Countries: Andorra	
Sweden	Stockholm	Embassy		
Switzerland	Bern	Embassy	Countries: Liechtenstein	
Switzerland	Geneva	Consulate-General	Countries: Liechtenstein	
Ukraine	Kyiv	Embassy	Countries: Moldova	
United Kingdom	London	Embassy	Countries: Iceland	

=== Oceania ===
Host country	Host city	Mission	Concurrent accreditation	Ref.
Australia	Canberra	Embassy	Countries: Samoa; Solomon Islands; Vanuatu	
New Zealand	Wellington	Embassy	Countries: Cook Islands; Fiji; Tonga; Tuvalu	

=== Multilateral organizations ===
Organization	Host city	Host country	Mission	Concurrent accreditation	Ref.
Association of Southeast Asian Nations	Jakarta	Indonesia	Mission		
United Nations	New York City	United States	Permanent Mission	Countries: Grenada	
United Nations	Geneva	Switzerland	Permanent Mission	International Organizations: World Trade Organization	

== Gallery ==
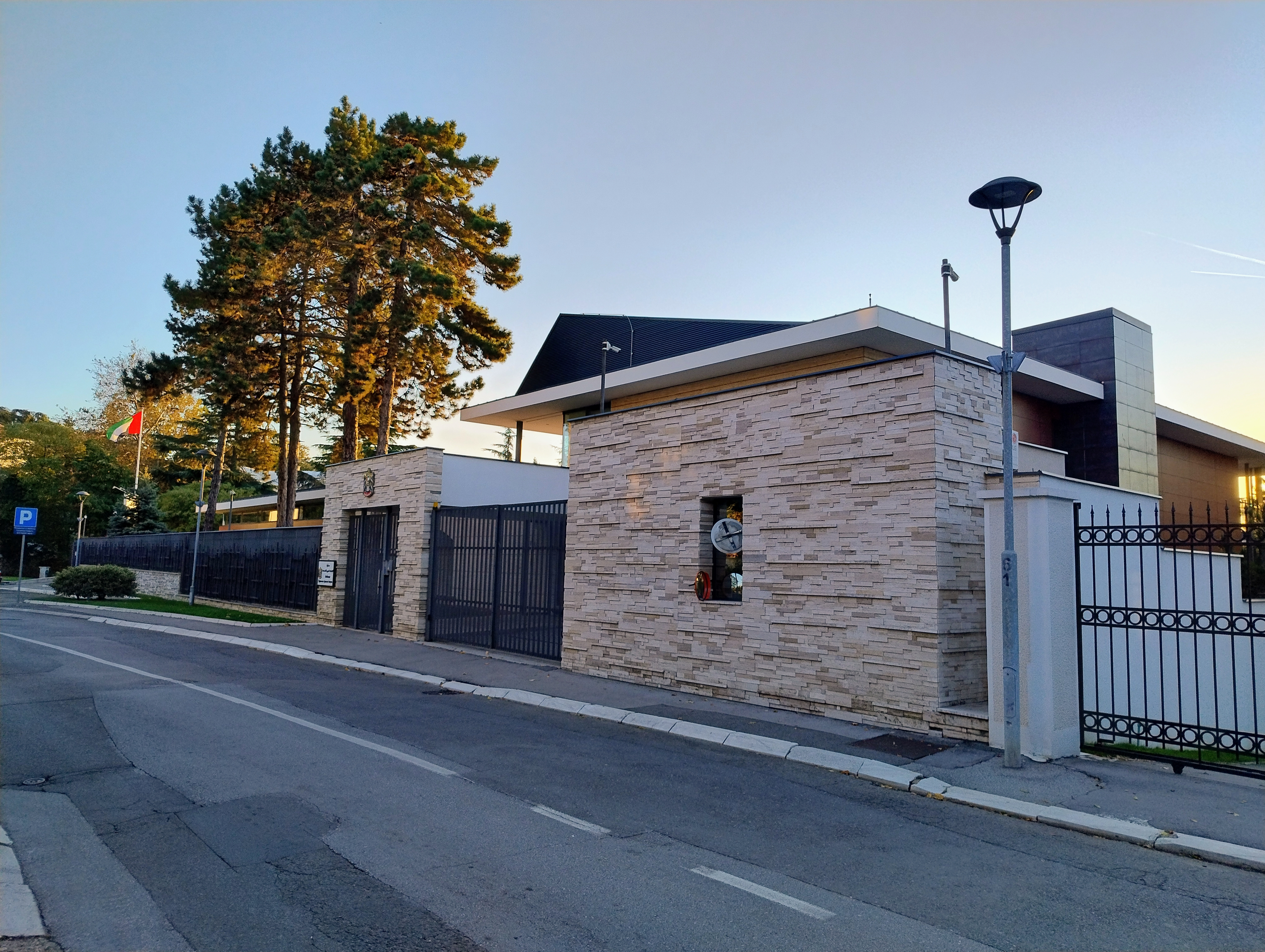
Embassy in Belgrade

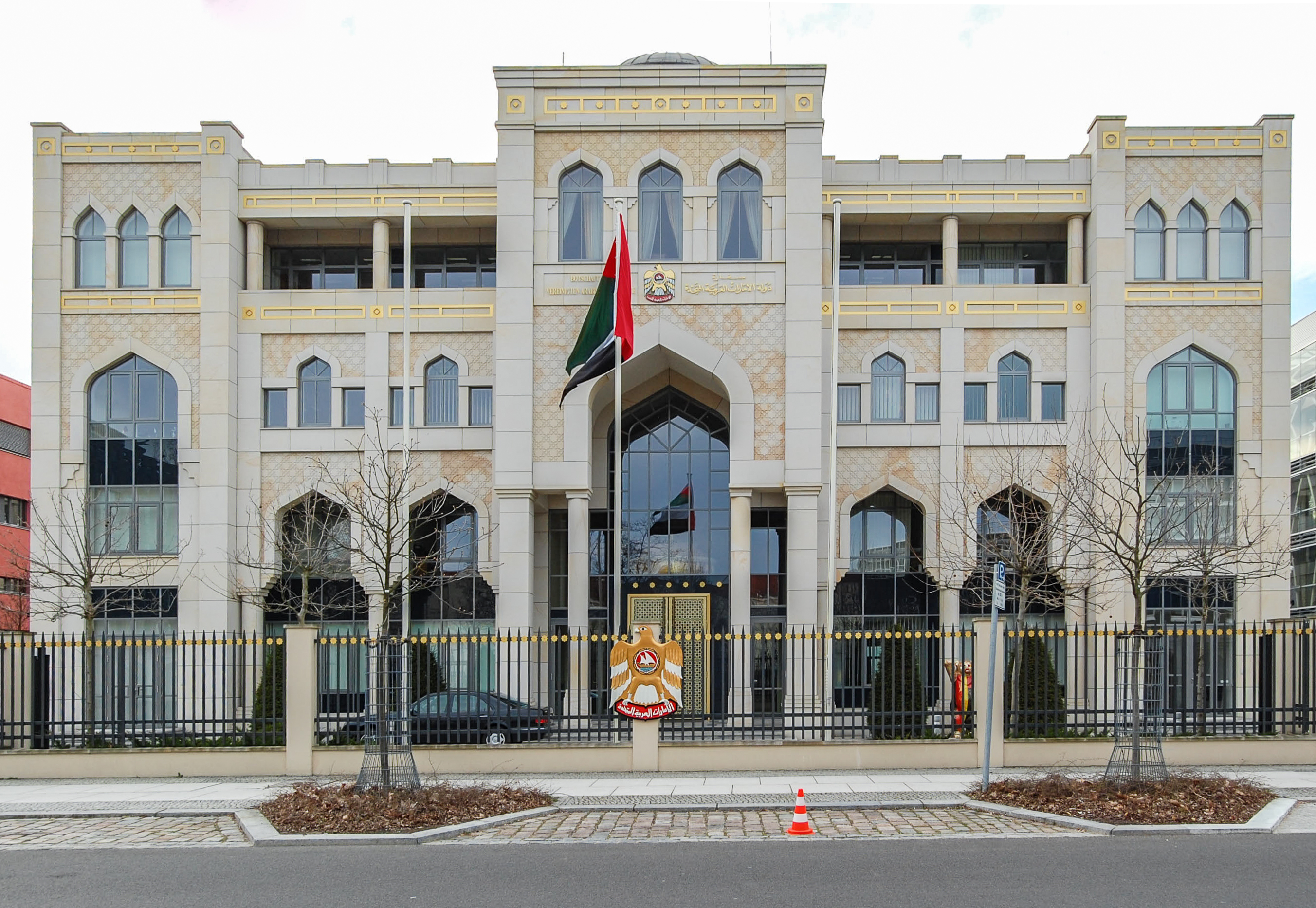
Embassy in Berlin

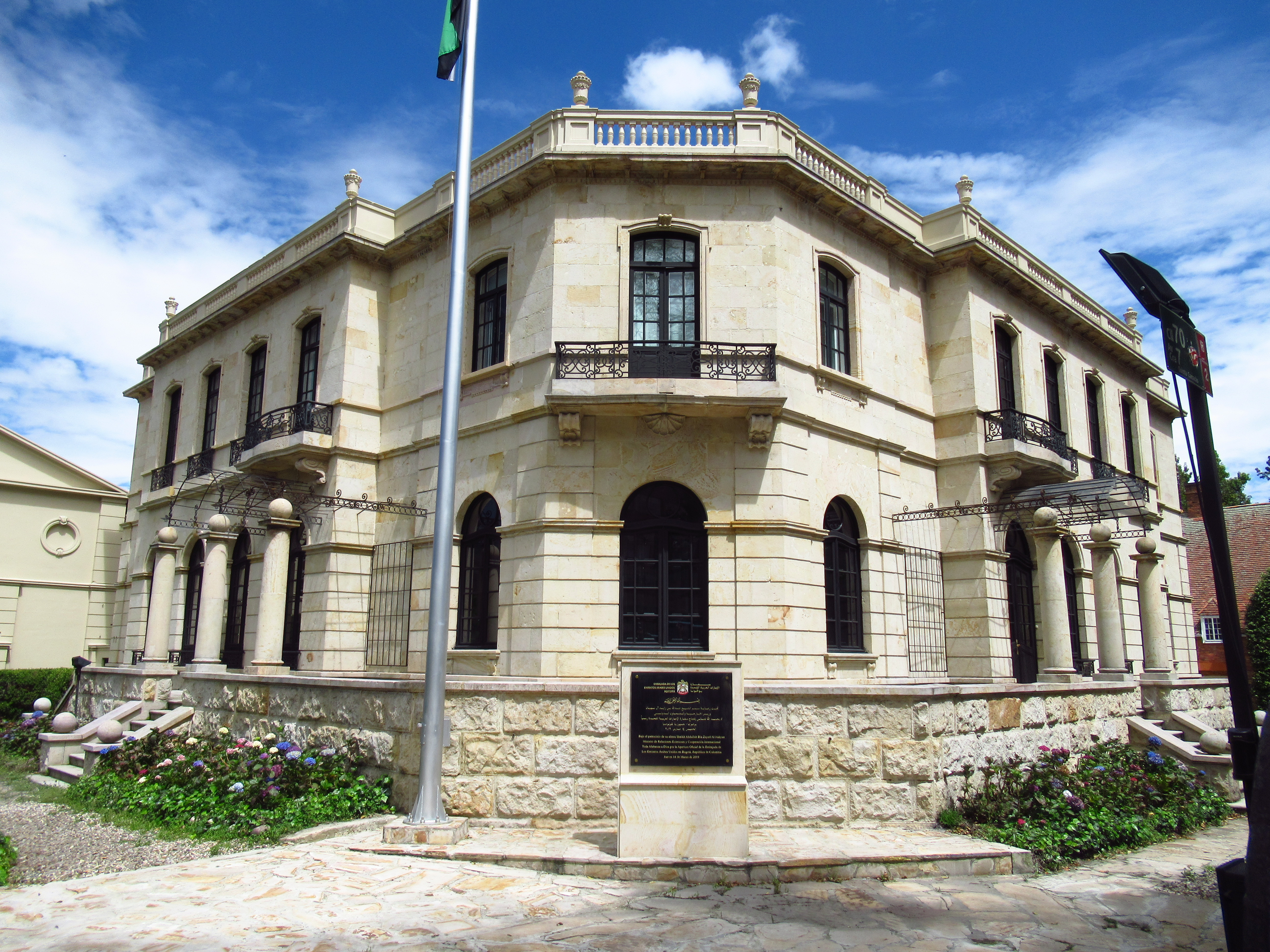
Embassy in Bogotá

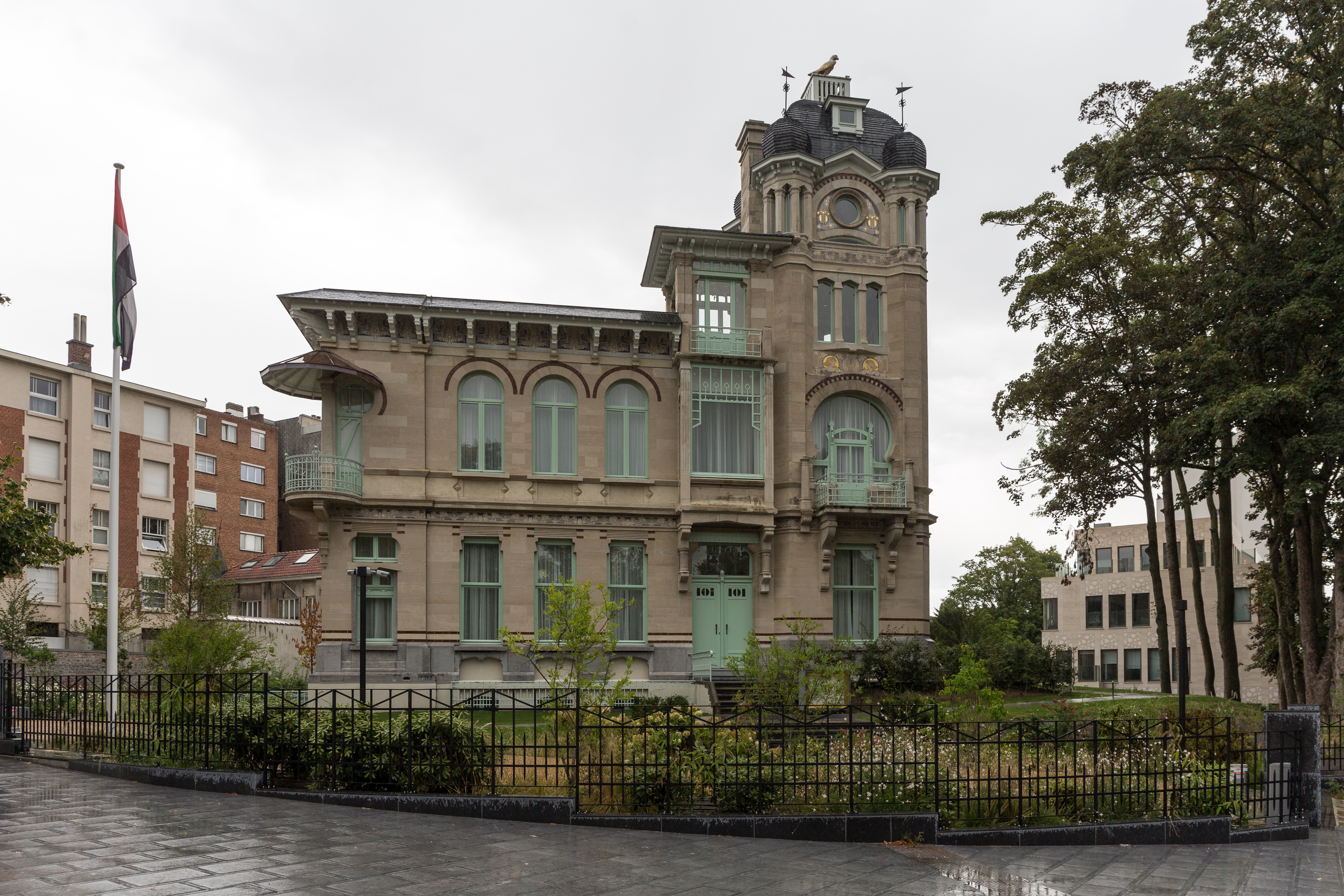
Embassy in Brussels

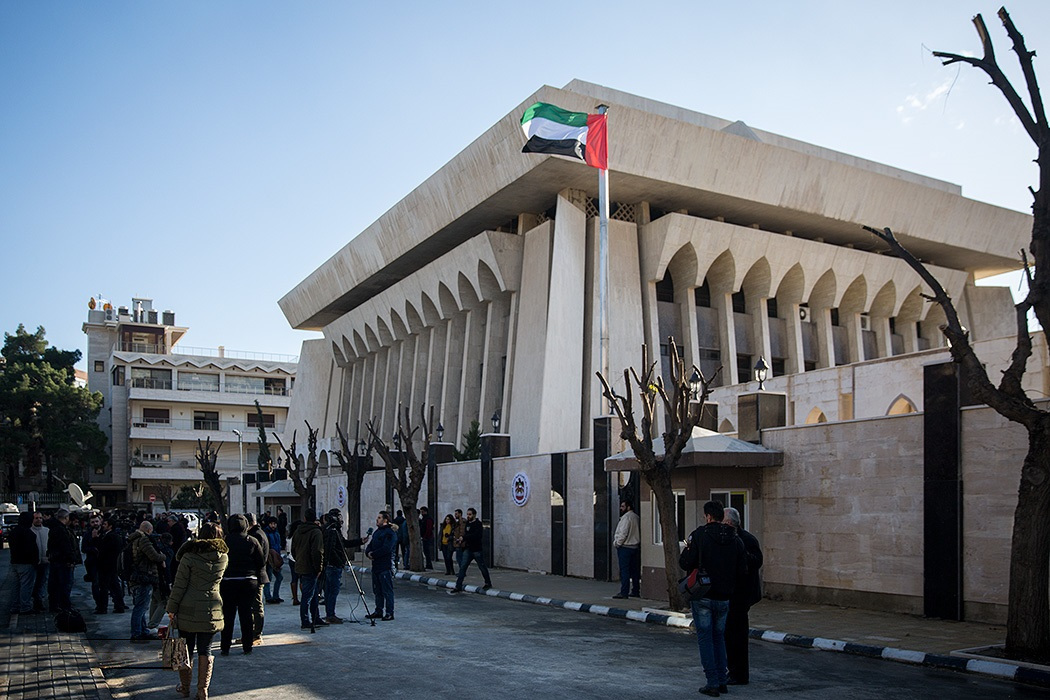
Embassy in Damascus

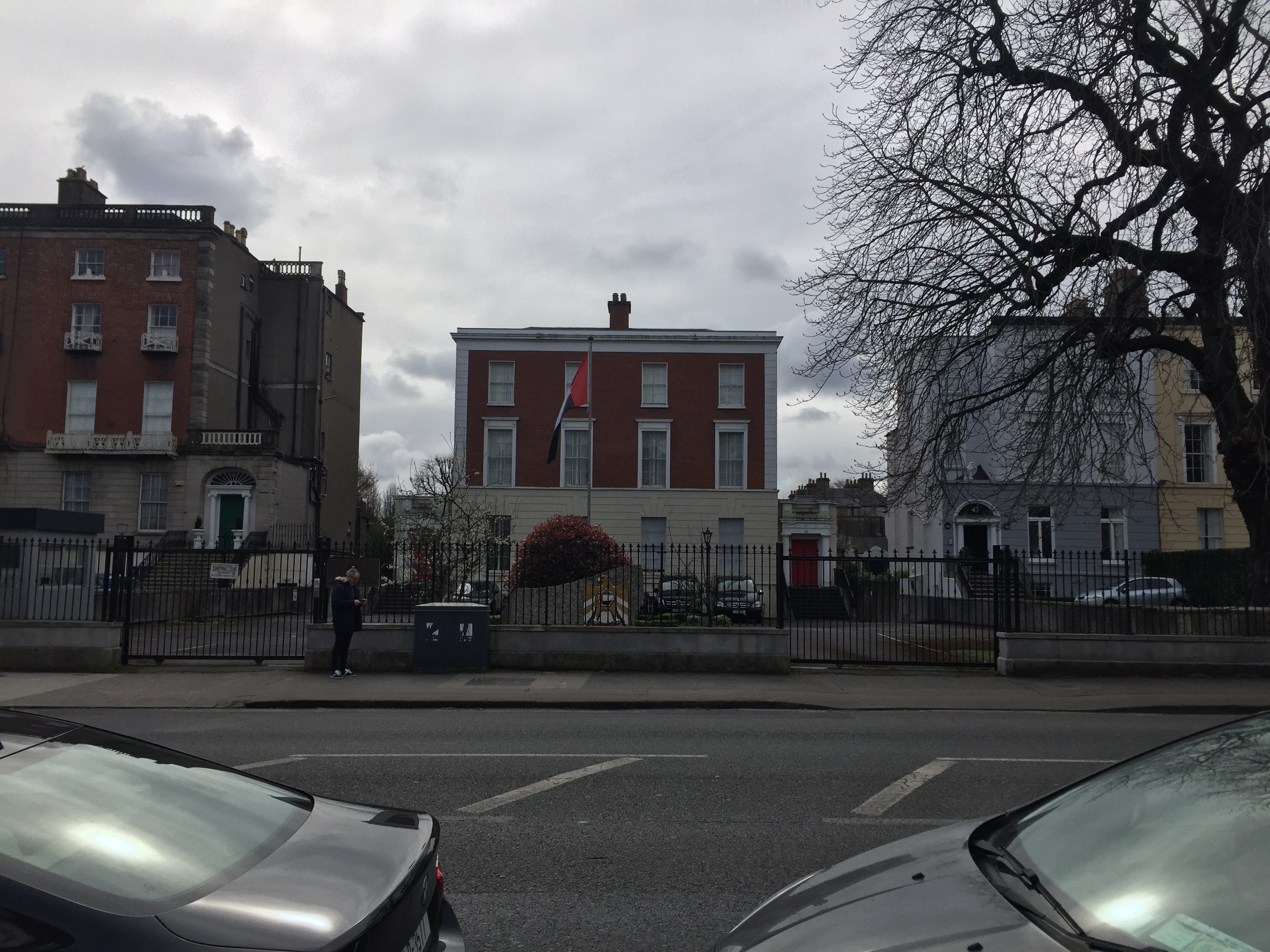
Embassy in Dublin

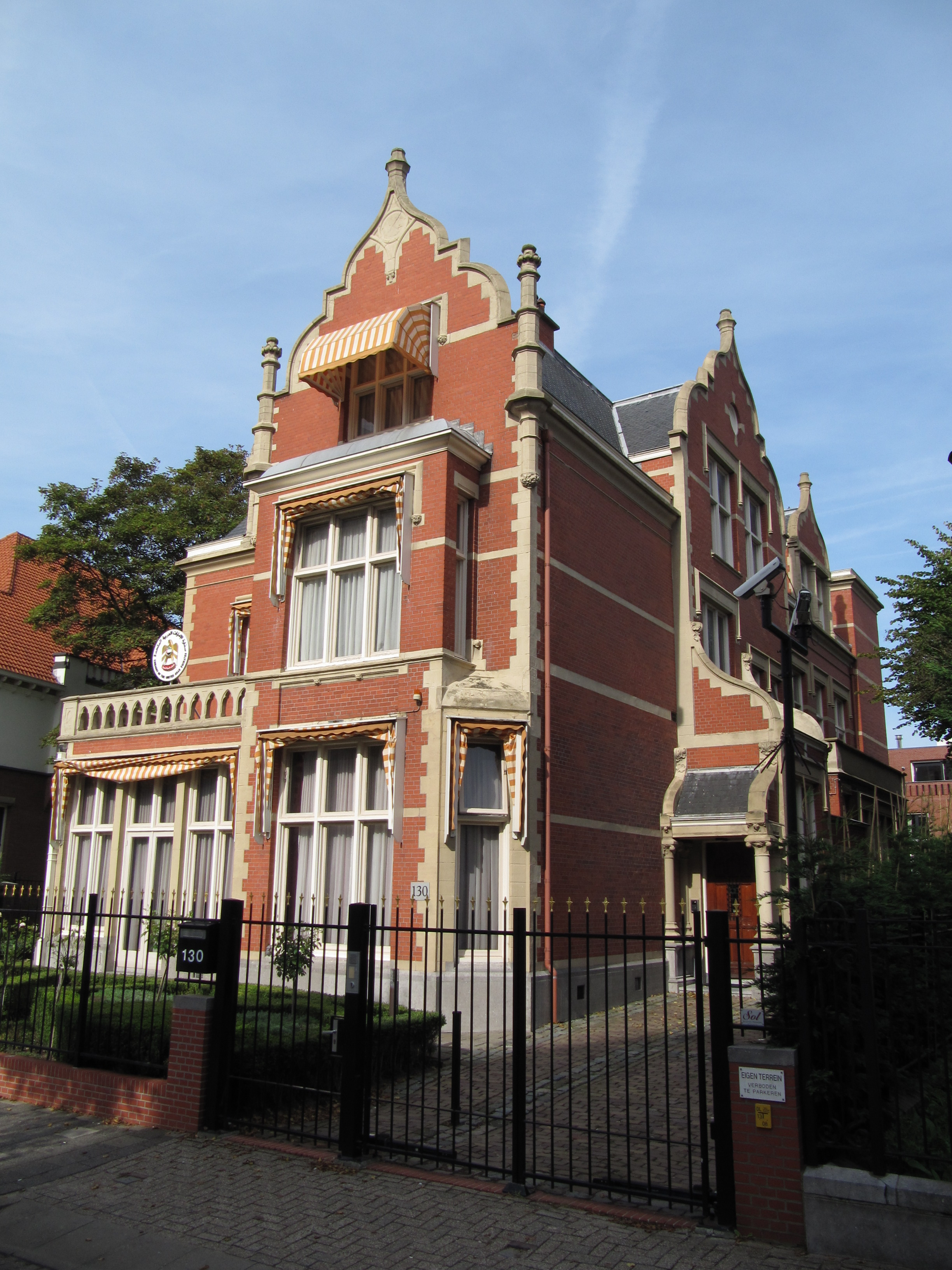
Embassy in The Hague

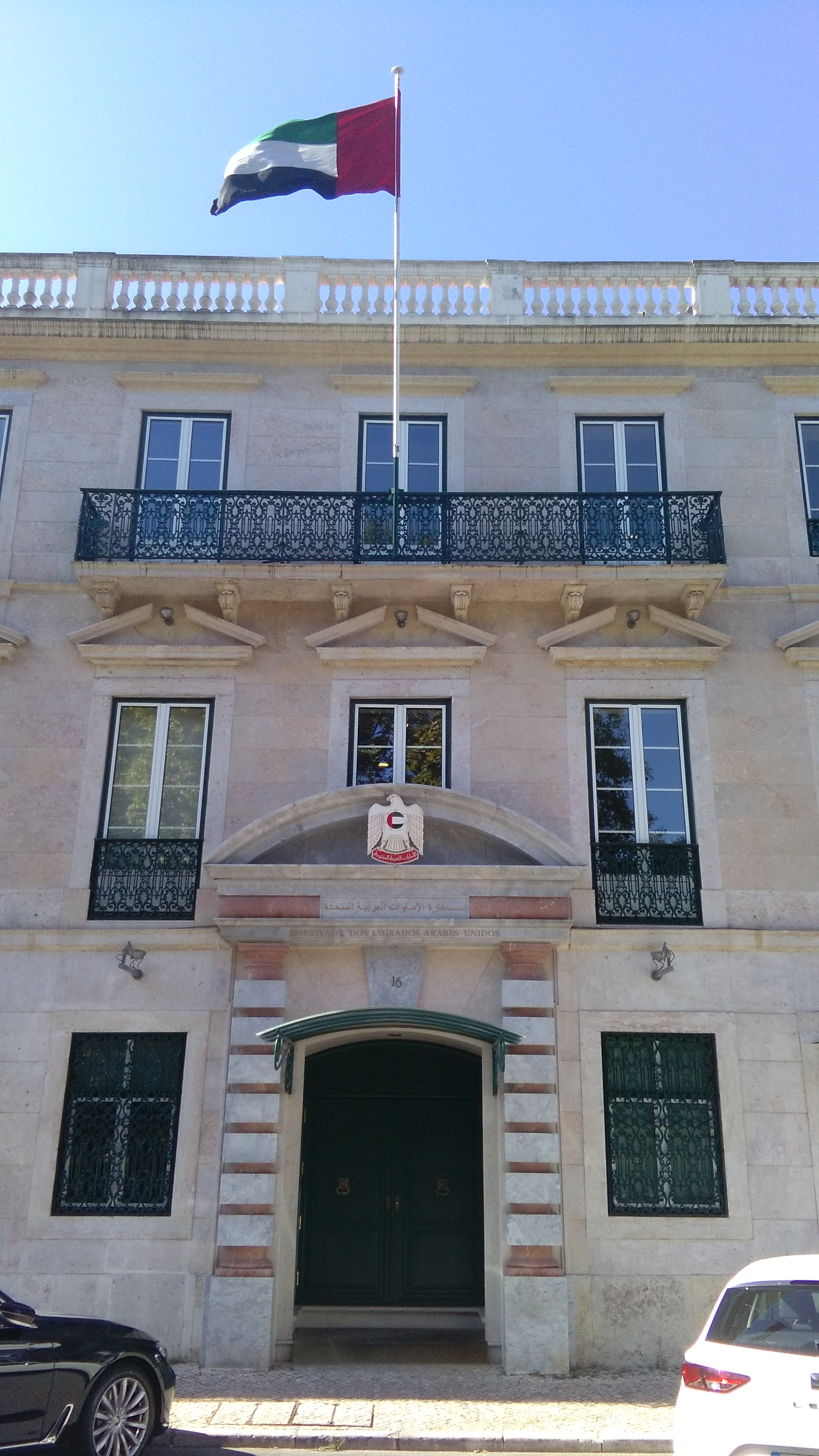
Embassy in Lisbon

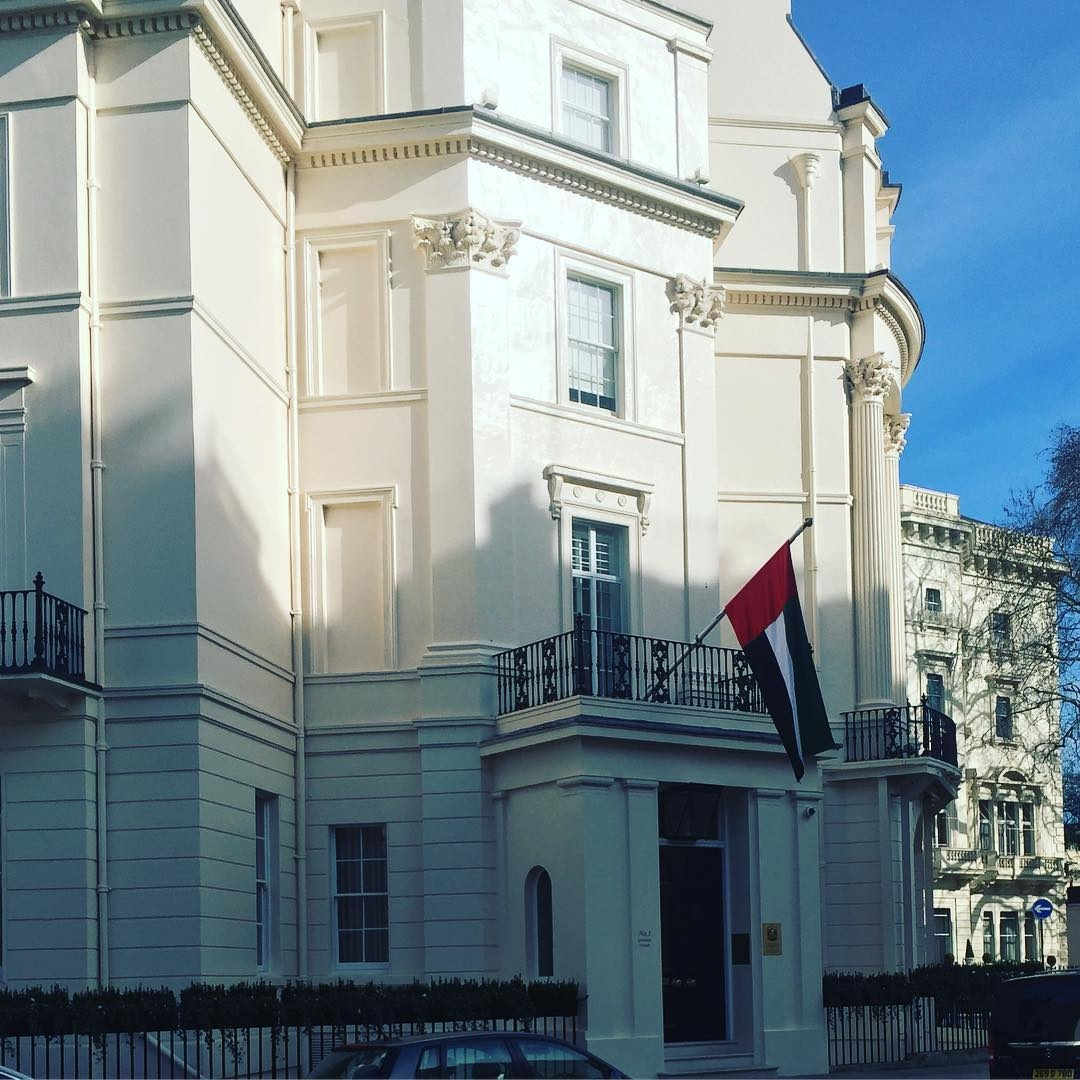
Embassy in London

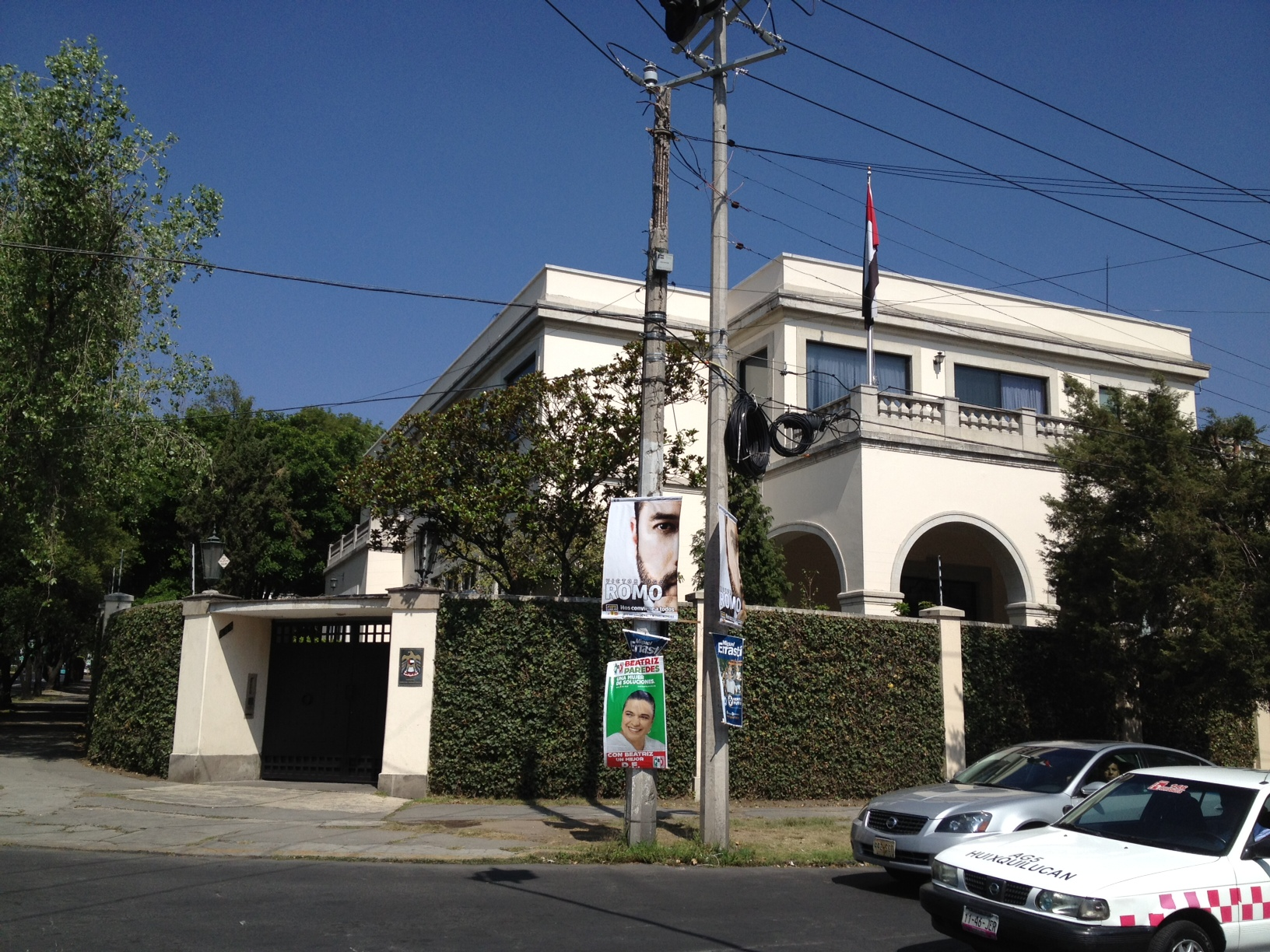
Embassy in Mexico City

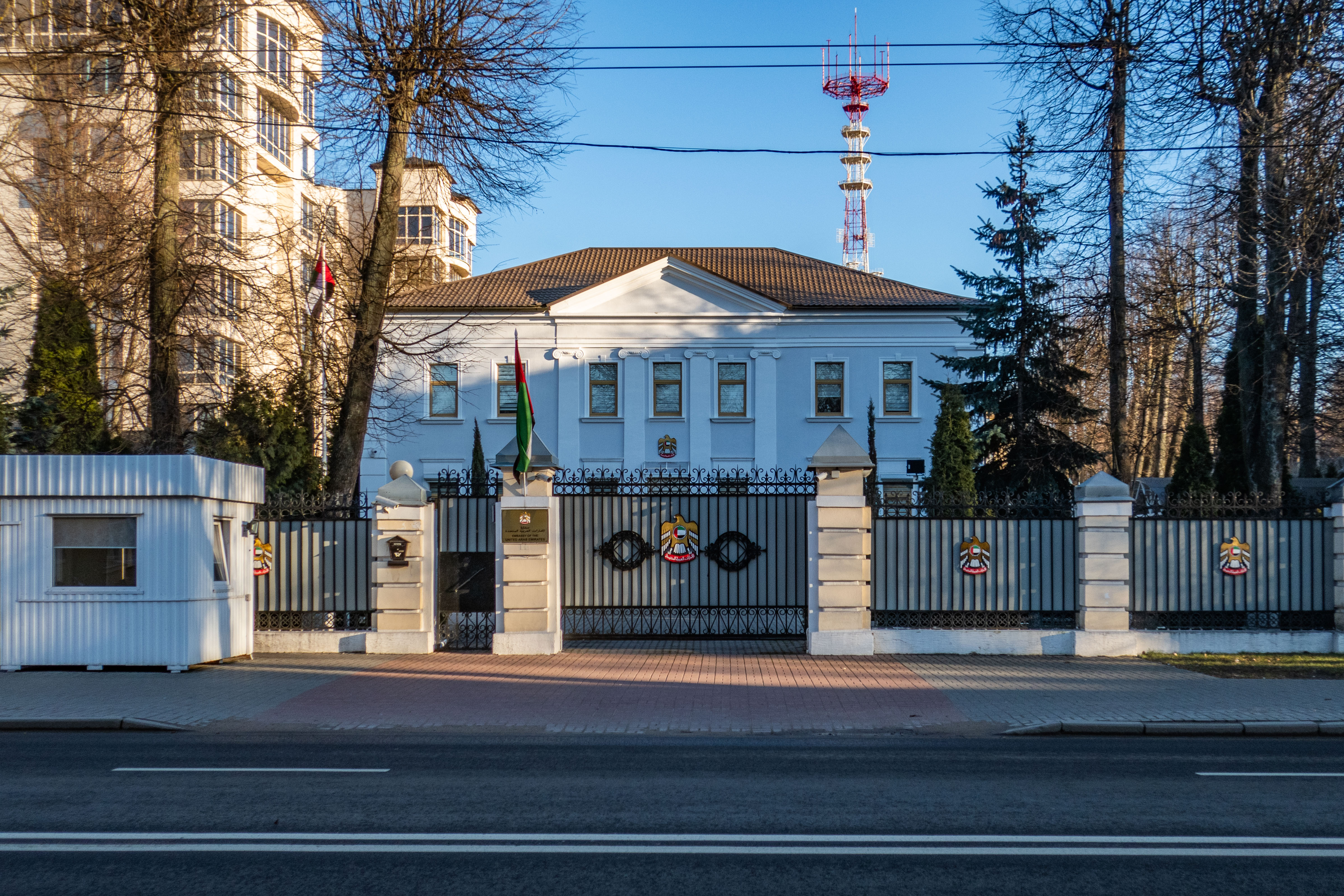
Embassy in Minsk

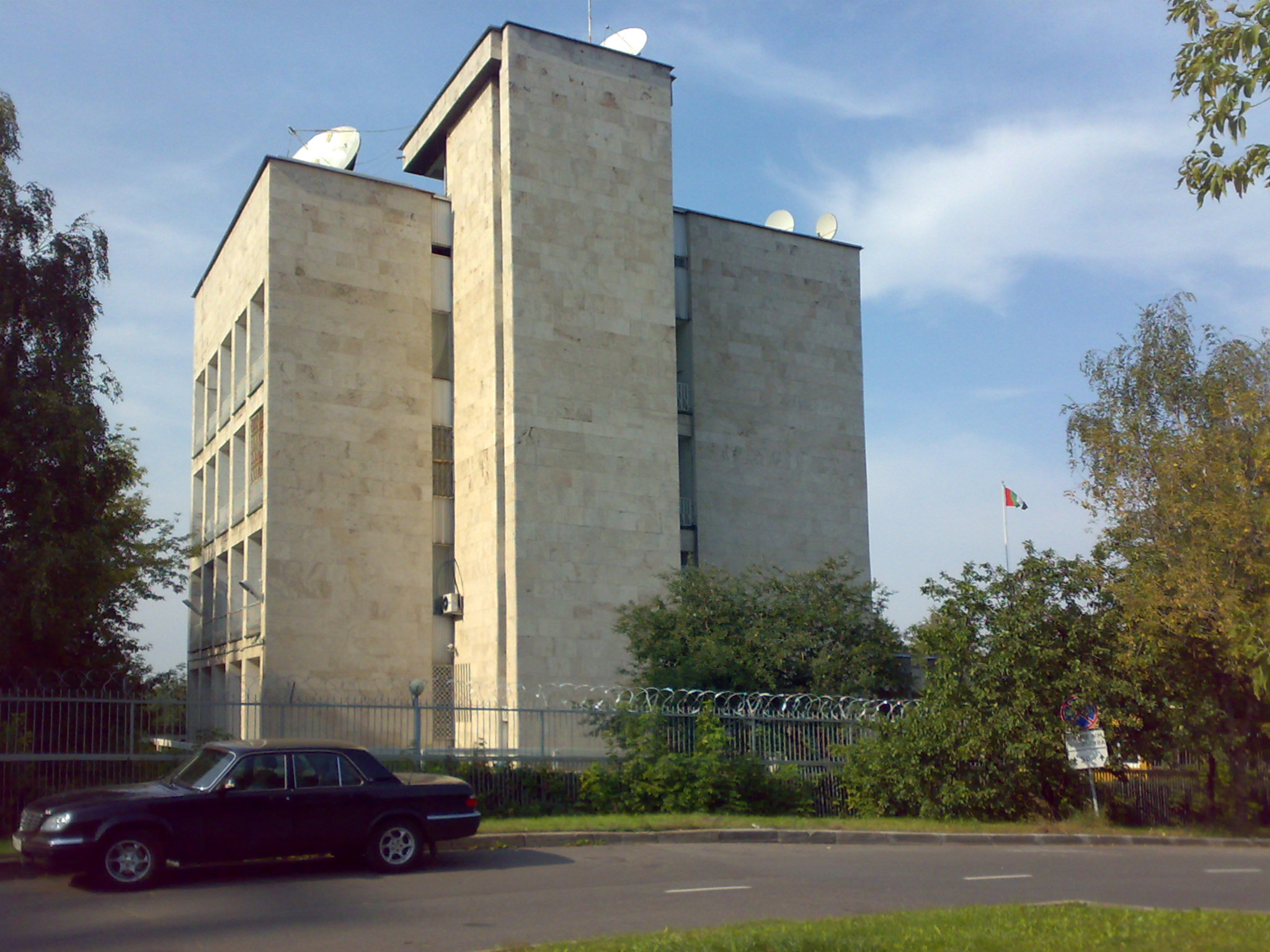
Embassy in Moscow

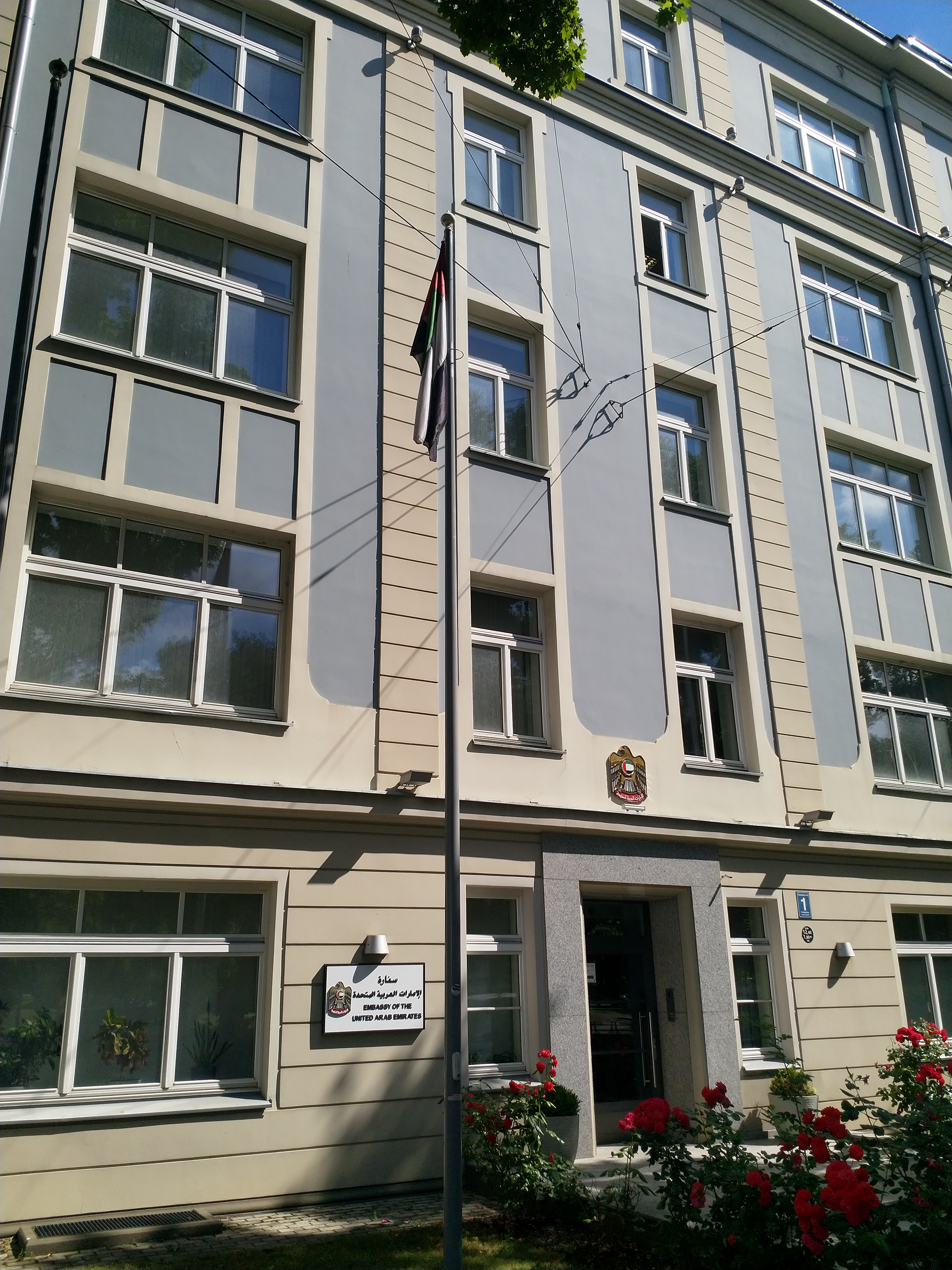
Embassy in Riga

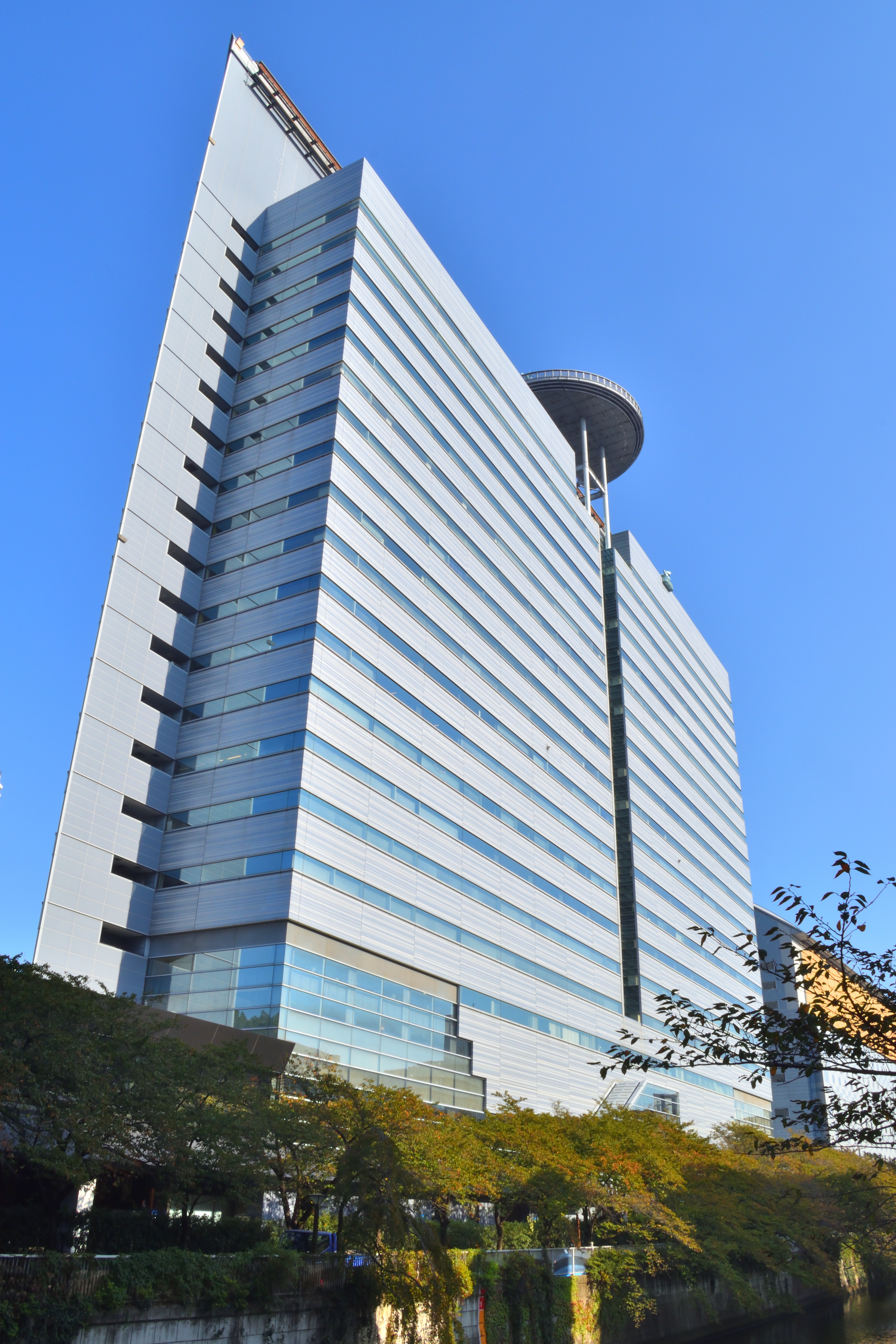
Building hosting the Embassy in Tokyo

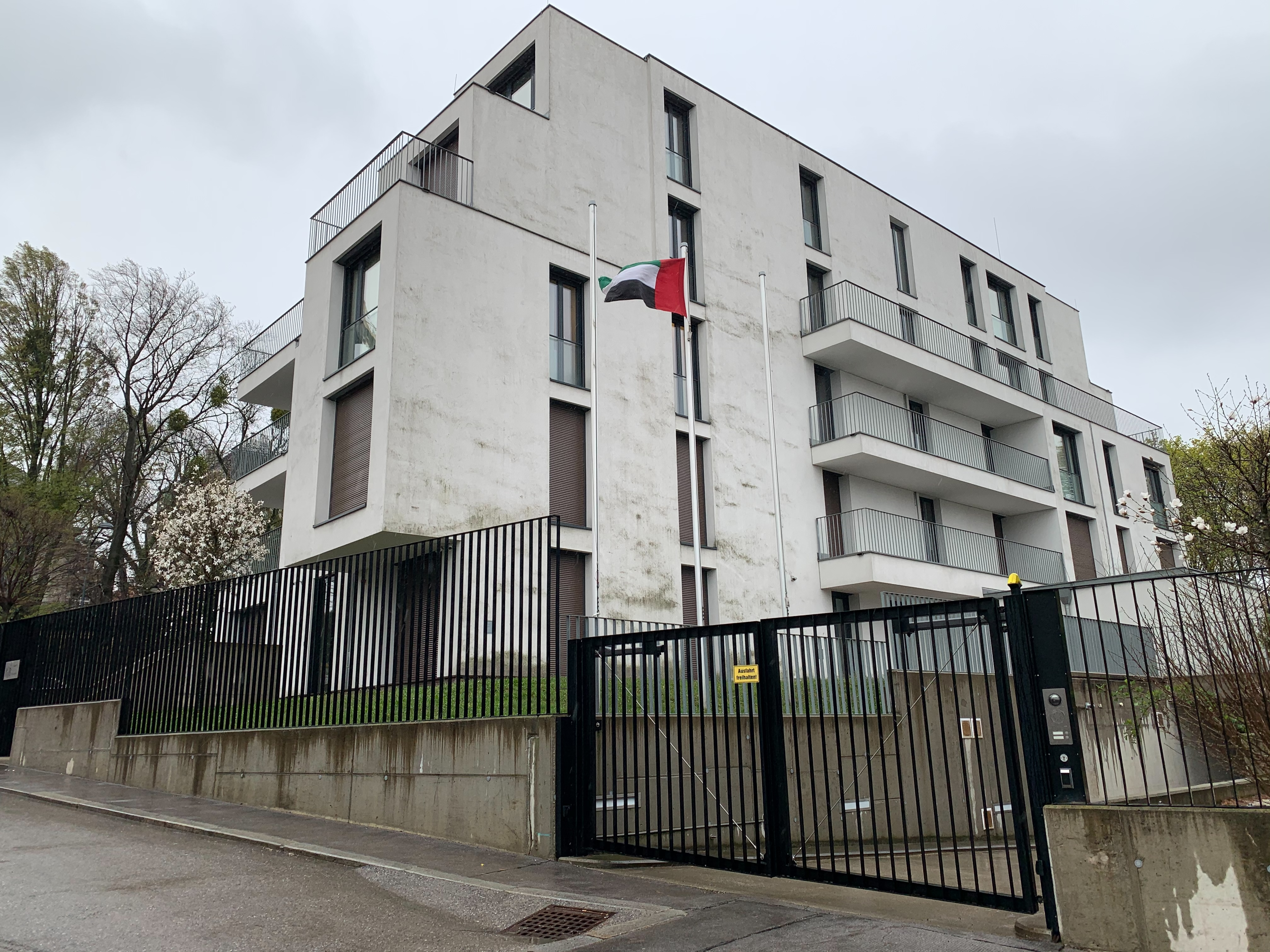
Embassy in Vienna

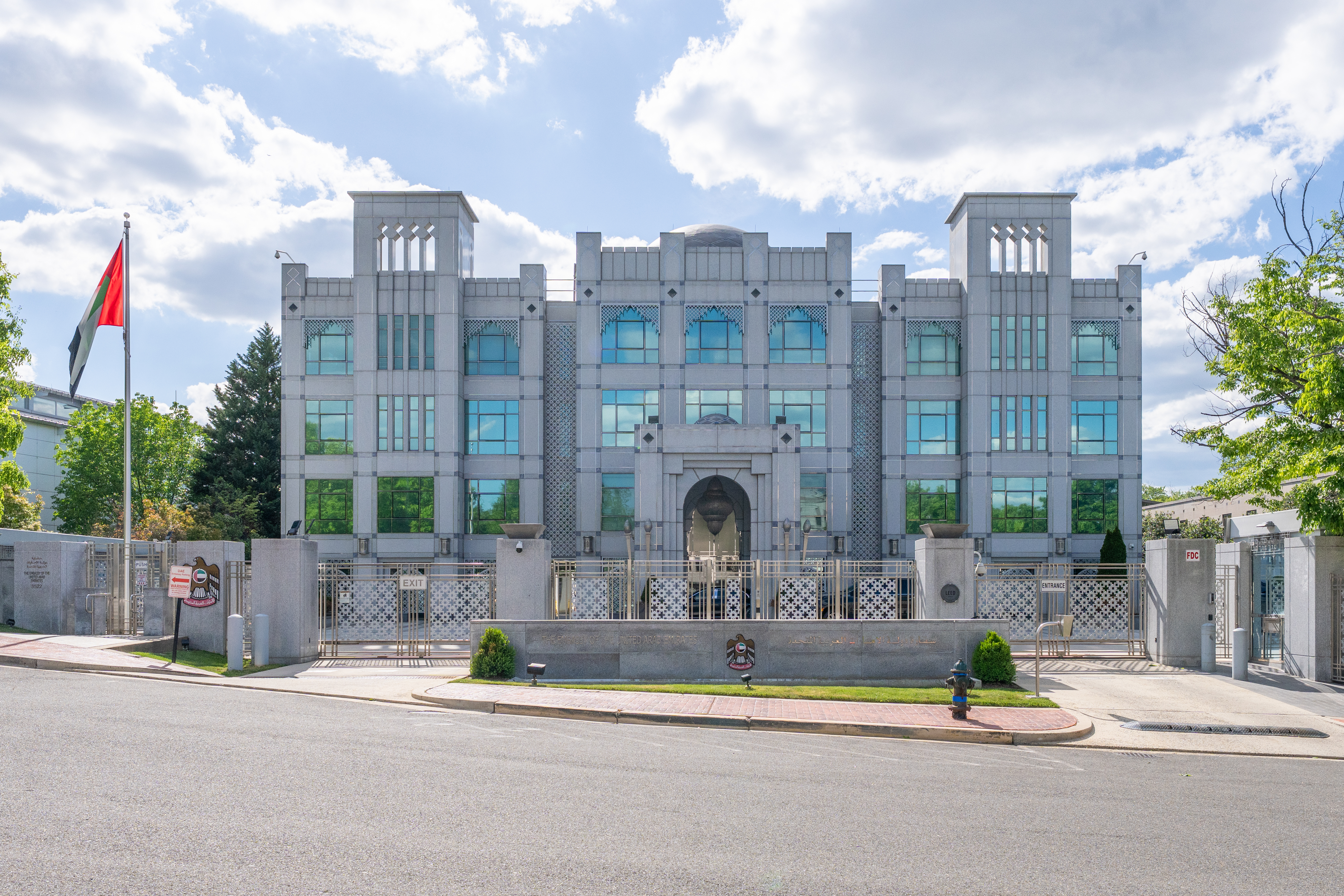
Embassy in Washington, D.C.

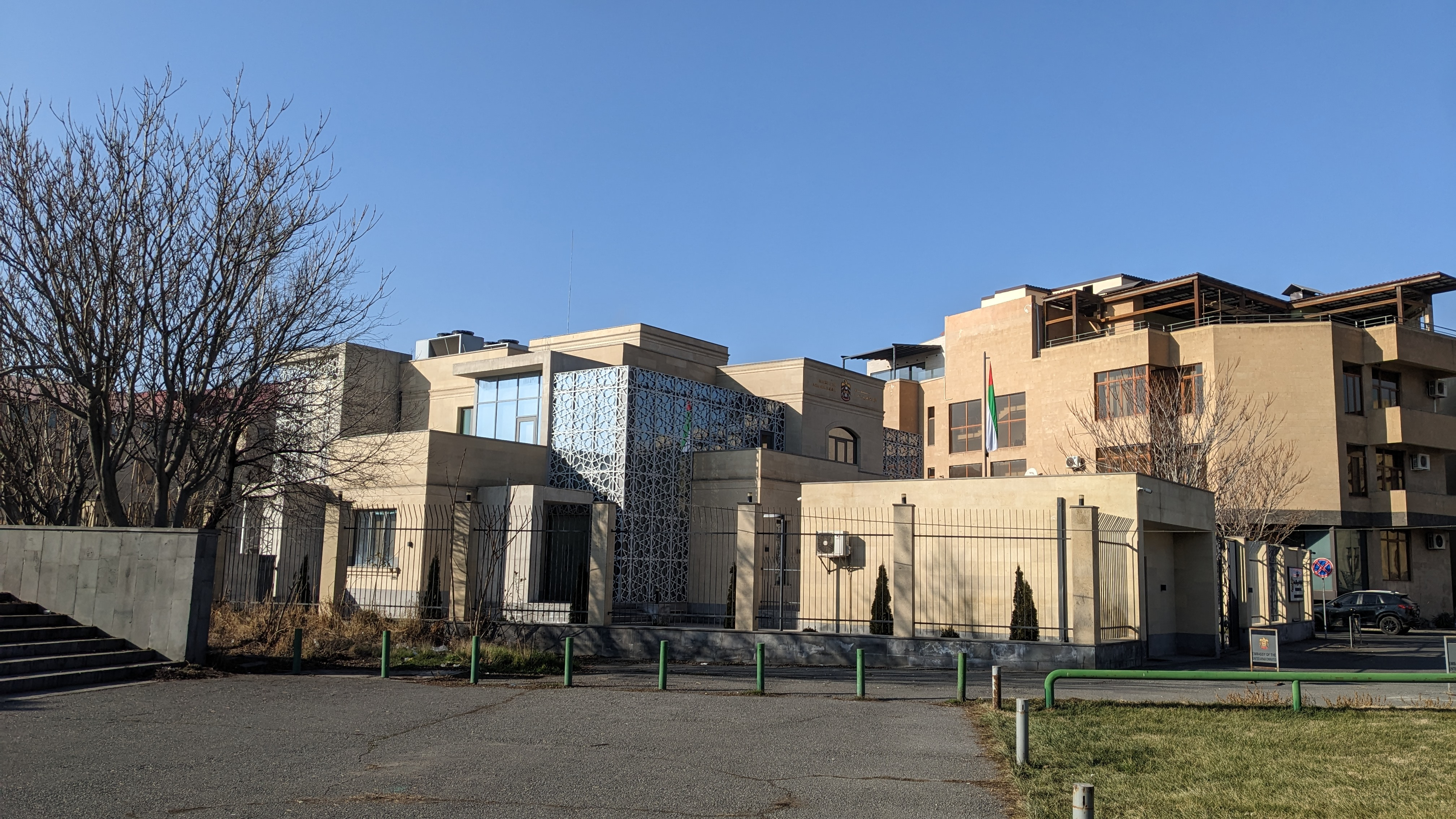
Embassy in Yerevan

== Diplomatic missions to open ==
- Botswana
  - Gaborone (Embassy)
- Fiji
  - Suva (Embassy)
- Kosovo
  - Pristina (Embassy)

== Closed missions ==
=== Africa ===
Host country	Host city	Mission	Year closed	Ref.
Algeria	Algiers	Embassy	2026	
Sudan	Port Sudan (Note: Originally in Khartoum, the embassy was relocated to Port Sudan due to the ongoing civil war. Was closed in 2025 as a result of severance of relations with Sudan.)	Embassy	2025	

=== Americas ===
Host country	Host city	Mission	Year closed	Ref.
Canada	Toronto	Consulate-General	Unknown (Note: Most likely closed somewhere between 2014 - the year of its establishment - and 2026.)	
Panama	Panama City	Embassy	Unknown (Note: Most likely closed somewhere between 2017 - the year of its establishment - and 2025.)	

=== Asia ===
Host country	Host city	Mission	Year closed	Ref.
Iran	Tehran	Embassy	2026	

=== Europe ===
Host country	Host city	Mission	Year closed	Ref.
Germany	Bonn	Consulate-General (Note: Originally an extension office of the embassy in Berlin, was converted into a consulate-general in 2018.)	Unknown (Note: Most likely closed sometime before 2026.)	
Spain	Barcelona	Consulate-General	2022	

=== Oceania ===
Host country	Host city	Mission	Year closed	Ref.
Australia	Melbourne	Consulate-General	Unknown (Note: Most likely closed somewhere between 2018 and 2026.)	

== See also ==
- List of diplomatic missions in the United Arab Emirates
- Foreign relations of the United Arab Emirates
- Visa policy of the United Arab Emirates
