= Saeed Mohammad Al Gandi =

Emirati politician

President of the Federal National Council
- In office 19 February 2003 – 12 February 2007
- Preceded by: Mohammed Khalifa Habtour
- Succeeded by: Abdul Aziz Al Ghurair

Saeed Mohammad Al Ghandi (Said Mohammed Said Al Kendi) is an Emirati businessman and the former speaker of the UAE Federal National Council, and was appointed to the position in 2003. He is the founder of Al Ghandi Group.

He served as the speaker from 2003 to 2005.
