= Abdul Aziz Al Ghurair =

Emirati businessman

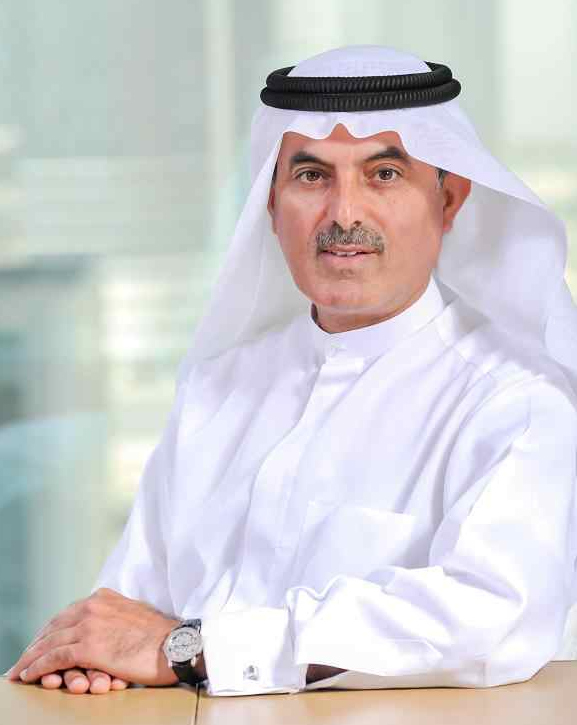

President of the Federal National Council
- In office 12 February 2007 – 15 November 2011
- Preceded by: Saeed Mohammad Al Gandi
- Succeeded by: Mohammad Al-Murr

Personal details
- Born: 1 July 1954 (age 71)
- Children: 5
- Parent: Abdulla Al Ghurair
- Education: California Polytechnic State University (BS)
- Occupation: Chairman of Al Ghurair

Abdul Aziz Al Ghurair (Arabic: عبد العزيز الغرير; born 1 July 1954) is an Emirati politician and billionaire businessman who is chairman of Mashreq and a director of the Abdullah Al Ghurair Group. Al Ghurair was speaker of the UAE's Federal National Council from 2007 to 2011. As of 2022, his net worth was estimated by Forbes at US$2.6 billion.

== Education ==
Al Ghurair trained as an industrial engineer and earned a bachelor's degree from California Polytechnic State University. He joined Mashreq in 1977, and worked in various capacities until 1988, and he took over responsibility for the bank's international operations, setting up branches in New York, London, Bahrain, Qatar, Egypt, India and Pakistan. He was appointed executive director in 1989 and became CEO the following year.

== Career ==
Al Ghurair is currently the chairman of Mashreq, a financial institution in the UAE founded by his uncle, Majed Ahmed Al Ghurair during the Gulf's first oil boom in the 1960s. His family has holdings include real estate, cement, contracting, among others. The food division of his holdings includes the Middle East's second-largest flour mill and Masafi mineral water. Al Ghurair also chairs the Arab Business Angels Network.

Al Ghurair was the speaker of the House of the Federal National Council (FNC) in the United Arab Emirates from 2007 until 2011.

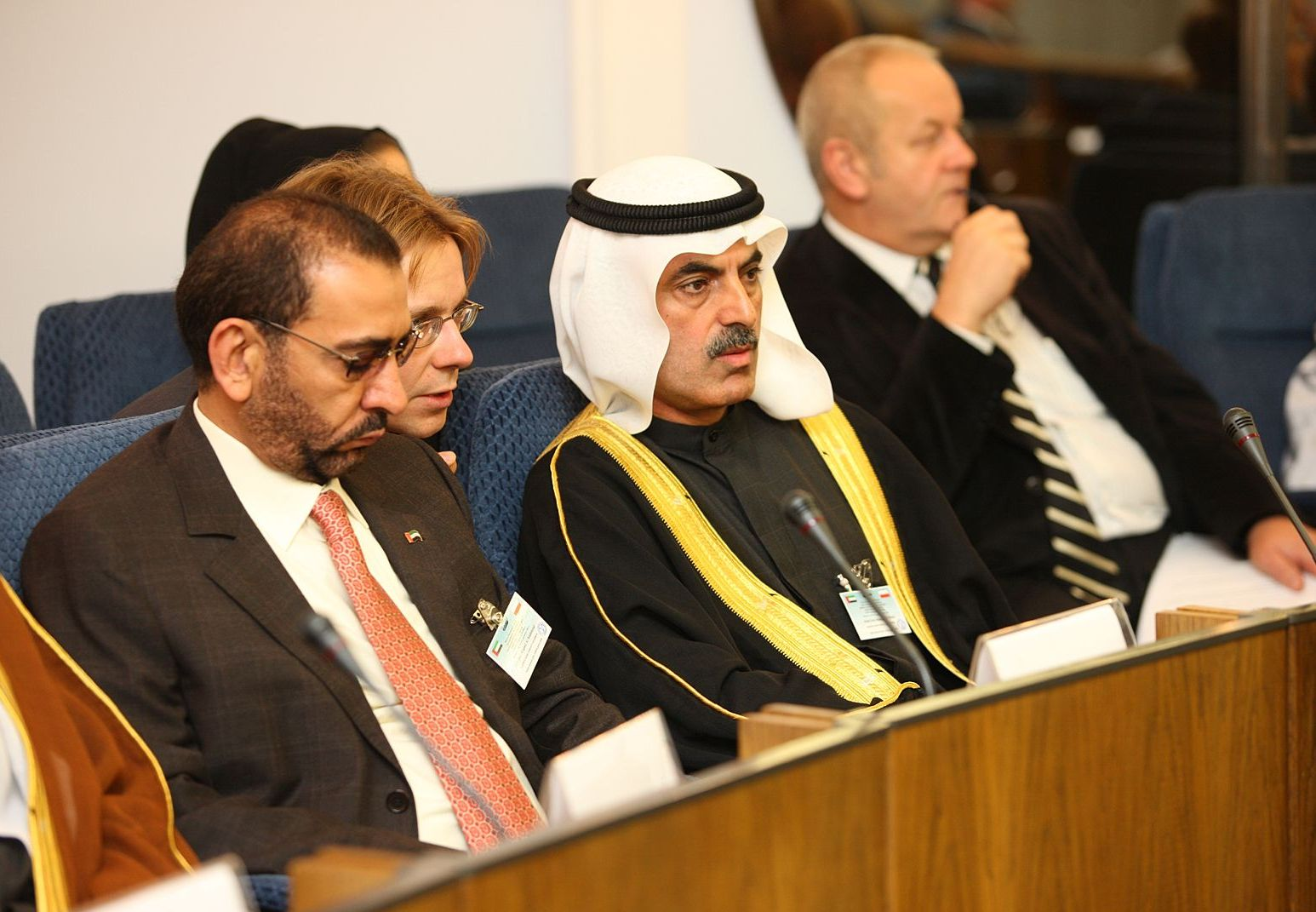
Abdul Aziz Al Ghurair in the Polish Senate (2008)

Al Ghurair was also the CEO of Mashreq since 1990. Mashreq was the first to launch automated teller machines (ATMs); debit and credit cards; travellers' cheques; consumer loans; point of sale (POS) terminals in the Middle East.

Al Ghurair is also the chairman of Al Ghurair Investments, a diversified group with a core focus on foods, commodities, construction and properties. He previously sat on the board of directors of Emaar, Visa International, MasterCard, Dubai International Financial Centre, and was co-chairman of the Arab Business Council. He currently serves as Chairman of the Dubai Chamber of Commerce.

== Philanthropy ==
Al Ghurair supports many charitable organizations including UNICEF, UNESCO and the UAE Disabled Sports Federation.

Al Ghurair was part of the official delegation from the UAE to visit the Vatican and meet with Pope Benedict XVI on 21 October 2008.

In 2015, Al Ghurair pledged one-third of his group's assets to the Abdulla Al Ghurair Foundation for Education.
