= Mohammad Al Murr =

Emirati writer (born 1955)

Mohammad Ahmad Mohammad Al Murr Al Falasi

President of the Federal National Council
- In office 15 November 2011 – 18 November 2015
- Preceded by: Abdul Aziz Al Ghurair
- Succeeded by: Amal Al Qubaisi

Personal details
- Born: 1955; Dubai
- Occupation: Short story writer

Mohammad Ahmad Mohammad Al Murr Al Falasi (born 1955 in Dubai) is a short-story writer from the United Arab Emirates.

He has published over 15 volumes of short stories and has had two collections translated into English: Dubai Tales and The Wink of the Mona Lisa.

Al Murr graduated from Syracuse University in the United States, and has been a member of a number of UAE academic institutions and councils. He is the head of the Dubai Cultural Council, recently reorganized as the Dubai Culture & Arts Authority.

In 2011 Al Murr was appointed to the Federal National Council's 15th Chapter as a representative of the Emirate of Dubai, and elected uncontested as Speaker. He served as the speaker from 2011 to 2015.
