= Emirates of the United Arab Emirates =

Subdivision of the United Arab Emirates

Emirates of the United Arab Emirates إمارات دولة الإمارات العربية المتحدة (Arabic)
- Category: Federated state
- Location: United Arab Emirates
- Number: 7 emirates
- Populations: 72,000 (Umm Al Quwain) – 4,135,985 (Abu Dhabi)
- Areas: 260 km^{2} (100 sq mi) (Ajman) – 67,000 km^{2} (26,000 sq mi) (Abu Dhabi)
- Government: Emirate government
- Subdivisions: Regions, municipalities, counties

The United Arab Emirates consists of seven emirates (Arabic: إمارات ʾimārāt; singular: إمارة ʾimārah), which were historically known as the Trucial States.

Each emirate maintains sovereignty over its territory and functions in parallel with the federal government of the United Arab Emirates as per the United Arab Emirates Constitution.

== List of emirates ==
Map	Historical Flag	Emirate	Arabic name	Date joined the UAE	Capital	Population	Area (km^{2})	Area (sq mi)	ISO Code
		Abu Dhabi	أبو ظبي ʾAbū dhabī	2 December 1971	Abu Dhabi	4,135,985 (2024)	67,340	26,000	AE-AZ
		Ajman	عجمان ʿAjmān	2 December 1971	Ajman	504,846 (2017)	259	100	AE-AJ
		Dubai	دبي; Dubai	2 December 1971	Dubai	4,471,000 (2024)	4,114	1,590	AE-DU
		Fujairah	الفجيرة; Al-Fujayrah	2 December 1971	Fujairah	202,667 (2014)	1,450	560	AE-FU
		Ras Al Khaimah	رأس الخيمة; Raʾs al-khaimah	10 February 1972	Ras Al Khaimah	345,000 (2015)	1,684	650	AE-RK
		Sharjah	الشارقة; Aš-Šāriqah	2 December 1971	Sharjah	1,808,000 (2022)	2,590	1,000	AE-SH
		Umm Al Quwain	أم القيوين ʾUmm Al-Qaywayn	2 December 1971	Umm Al Quwain	49,159 (2005)	720	280	AE-UQ

== See also ==
- ISO 3166-2:AE
