= Amal Al Qubaisi =

Emirati politician (born 1969)

- أمل القبيسي
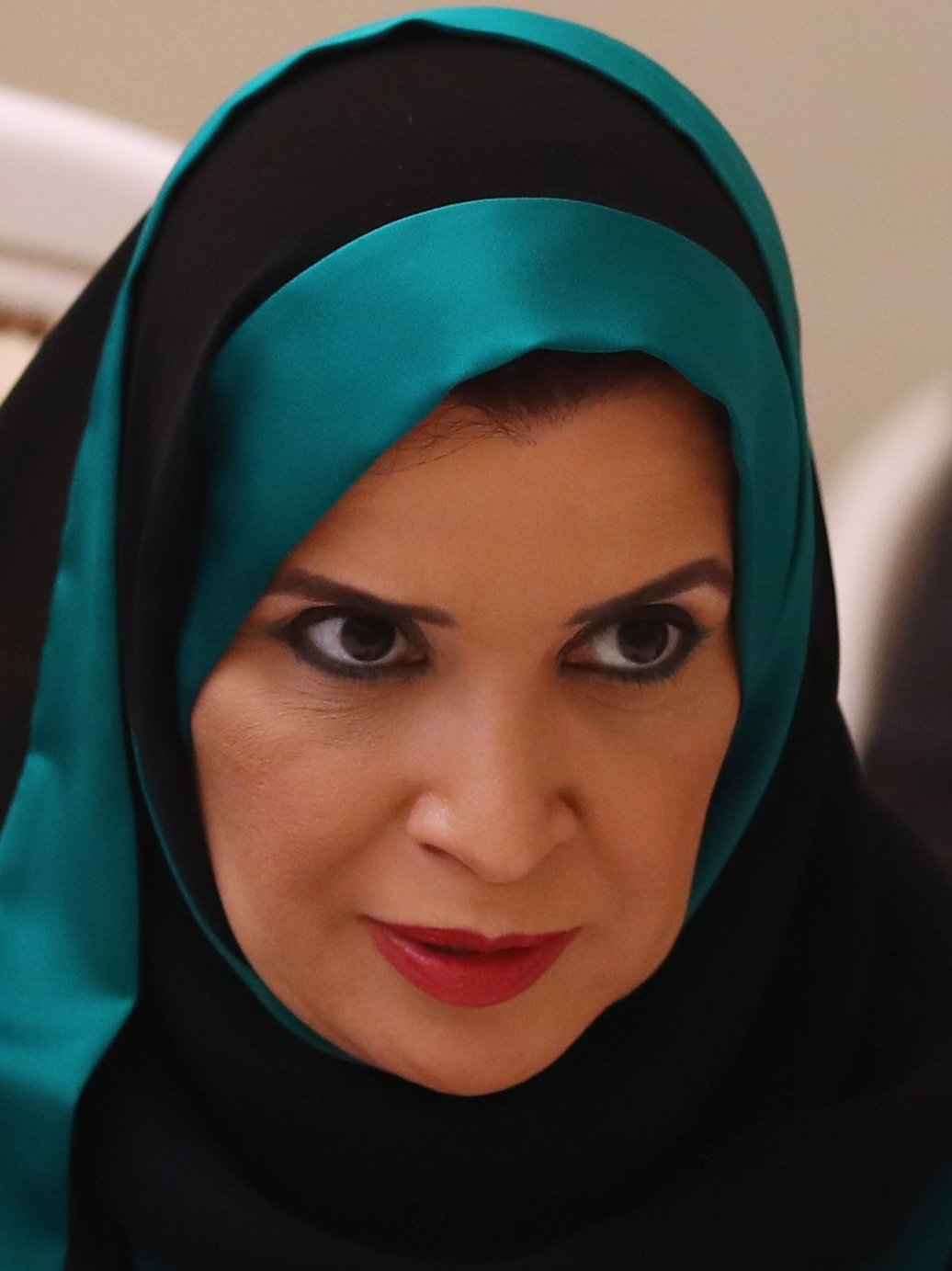
- Amal Al Qubaisi, October 2017

President of the Federal National Council
- In office 18 November 2015 – 14 November 2019
- Preceded by: Mohammad Al-Murr
- Succeeded by: Saqr Ghobash

Personal details
- Born: 18 October 1969 (age 56) Abu Dhabi, United Arab Emirates
- Education: University of the United Arab Emirates; University of Sheffield
- Awards: Abu Dhabi Award

Amal Al Qubaisi (born 18 October 1969) is an Emirati politician who served as the speaker of the United Arab Emirates Federal National Council (FNC) from 2015 to 2019. She was first female leader of a national assembly in the United Arab Emirates and the Arab world. Before holding the position she was the chairwoman of the Abu Dhabi Education Council.

== Career and education ==
In 2000, Al Qubaisi earned her Ph.D. in architectural engineering from the University of Sheffield in the United Kingdom and holds the world's only doctoral degree on the conservation of the UAE's architectural heritage. She became an assistant professor of architecture at UAE University in 2000 which she held until 2006. As an architect, she has worked with UNESCO to document and preserve more than 350 historical sites in the UAE including Al Jahili and Al Hosn Forts.

In 2001, she was appointed president of the cultural heritage unit of Al Ain's Tourism and Economic Development Authority. She served as president until 2003.

In 2007, she was elected to be a member of FNC for Abu Dhabi, making her the first woman elected. She headed the Education, Youth, Media and Culture Committee and was a member of the Health, Labour and Social Affairs Committee.

In 2011, Al Qubaisi was chosen as first deputy speaker of the FNC and became the first woman to chair a council session in 2013. In 2014, she was appointed as chairwomen of the Abu Dhabi Education Council.

On 18 November 2015, Al Qubaisi was appointed president of the FNC, making her the region's first female leader of a national assembly.

== Awards ==
- 2008, Abu Dhabi Award
- 2008, Middle East Excellence Award of Women Leadership, for being the most prominent female for her outstanding political achievement in 2007
- 2009, Abu Dhabi Medal of Honor
- 2014, Emirati Pioneers Award, for being the first Emirati woman elected to join the Federal National Council.
- 2016, Honorary Doctorate from the University of Sheffield
