= Federal National Council =

Advisory body in the UAE

Coordinates: 24°27′48″N 54°19′54″E

Federal National Council المجلس الوطني الاتحادي

Type
- Type: Unicameral

History
- Founded: 1971

Leadership
- Speaker: Saqr Ghobash since 14 November 2019

Structure
- Seats: 40
- Political groups: Independent (40)
- Length of term: 4 years

Elections
- Voting system: Indirect single non-transferable vote in seven electoral colleges (20 seats); Appointed by rulers of each emirate (20 seats)
- Last election: 7 October 2023
- Next election: 7 October 2027

Website
- www.almajles.gov.ae

The Federal National Council (FNC) (Arabic: المجلس الوطني الإتحادي, al-Majlis al-Watani al-Ittihadi) of the United Arab Emirates (UAE) is an advisory quasi-parliamentary body in the UAE. The FNC consists of 40 members. Twenty of the members are indirectly elected by the hand-picked 33% of Emirati citizens who have voting rights through an electoral college, while the other twenty are appointed by the rulers of each emirate. According to Reuters, "the process of selecting the people who can either elect or be elected is opaque."

The first election for half the members of the FNC took place in 2006. Members of the FNC serve 4-year terms. The last election for the indirectly elected members took place on 7 October 2023, and the next election is to be held in October 2027. The FNC assembly hall is located in Abu Dhabi, the capital of the UAE.

The National Election Committee (NEC) was established in February 2011 by the UAE Federal Supreme Council, and is chaired by the Minister of State for Federal National Council Affairs. Elections are conducted by the NEC which nominates members of the electoral college. Any citizen can be selected as a member. The NEC also manages the election of FNC representatives from all the emirates. The members of the electoral college can nominate themselves to be candidates for the FNC.

== History ==
The FNC was formed under the Provisional Constitution of the United Arab Emirates in 1971 as a permanent component of the country's governing structure, which also includes the Federal Supreme Council, president and vice president, cabinet, and judiciary. Before 2006, all members of the FNC were appointed by the rulers of the emirates.

According to the Constitution, federal draft laws first have to pass through the FNC for review and recommendations. Draft laws and amendments formed with the help of specialized house committees are presented to the FNC for discussion and then sent back to the Cabinet for consideration and approval. The FNC influences the Federal Government to draft laws. Original draft laws from the Cabinet can be amended by the FNC.

The FNC is responsible under the Constitution for examining, and, if it wishes, amending all proposed federal legislation, and is empowered to summon and question any Federal Minister regarding Ministry performance. One of the main duties of the FNC is to discuss the annual budget. Specialized sub-committees and a Research and Study Unit have been formed to assist FNC members to cope with the increasing demands of modern government.

== Composition ==
The Federal National Council has 40 members, half of whom are elected and half are appointed:

Emirate	Number of members
Abu Dhabi	8
Dubai	8
Sharjah	6
Ras Al Khaimah	6
Ajman	4
Fujairah	4
Umm Al Quwain	4
Total	40

== Speakers of the Federal National Council ==
Name	Took office	Left office	Notes
Thani Abdullah Humaid	1972	1976	
Taryam Omran Taryam	1977	1981	
Hilal bin Ahmed bin Lootah	1981	1991	
Al Haj bin Abdullah Al Muhairbi	1993	1996	
Mohammed Khalifa Habtour	1997	2003	
Saeed Mohammad Al Gandi	19 February 2003	12 February 2007	
Abdul Aziz Al Ghurair	12 February 2007	15 November 2011	
Mohammad Al-Murr	15 November 2011	18 November 2015	
Amal Al Qubaisi	18 November 2015	14 November 2019	
Saqr Ghobash	14 November 2019	Incumbent	

== Elections ==
=== 2006 ===
Not all UAE nationals were allowed to vote or run for office. 6,689 out of some 800,000 Emirati citizens in the country were eligible to take part in 2006 election. Those eligible were chosen by the rulers of the emirates.

Women were allowed to vote and run for office but there was no quota to ensure a set number of women were elected as there was in some other Arab countries. Over 14% of candidates were women. By the end of 2003, all forty members of the FNC were male.

Election officials billed the polls as a trial run they hoped will pave the way for universal suffrage in the coming years. Even then, however, only half of the FNC will be elected.

In late 2006, half of the organization was elected.

=== 2011 ===
2011 parliamentary election had an electoral college of 129,274 members, nearly 20 times more than in 2006. The new electoral college included about 12% of UAE nationals. Approximately 35% of the members were under 30 years of age and 46% were women. 35,877 voters cast their vote, making a turnout of 27.75%.

In all, 468 candidates, including 85 women, stood for the election. Many candidates pledged to provide better education and healthcare and more housing for young UAE nationals. They also promised to strengthen the UAE identity and culture. Several candidates used social media networks such as Facebook to present their plans.

=== 2015 ===
The electoral college increased from 129,274 in 2011 to 224,279 in 2015. All candidates ran as independents. During election campaigning, many candidates focused on social issues, promising to provide better housing and health services. Others focused on job creation and better educational services. 79,157 voters cast their vote. Turnout increased from 27.25% to 35.29%. As in the 2011 election, one woman was among the 20 winners. On 18 November, the newly elected members were sworn in alongside the 20 appointed members, including eight women.

The 2015 election used a single-vote system (meaning each voter voted for only one candidate in his/her emirate). Previously, voters were allowed to vote for as many as half the number of seats from their respective emirates. Eligible voters outside the country were allowed to vote for the first time in 2015.

=== 2019 ===
The 2019 election also used a single-vote system. The electoral college increased from 224,279 in 2015 to 337,738 in 2019. All candidates ran as independents. 117,592 voters cast their vote. Turnout slightly decreased from 35.29% to 34.81%.

Seven of the 20 elected members were women, although the sole incumbent elected female failed to win re-election.

=== 2023 ===
Parliamentary elections were held in the United Arab Emirates on 7 October 2023 to elect 20 of the 40 members of the Federal National Council. The electoral college membership was expanded from 337,738 in 2019 to 398,879 in 2023.
