= Women in the French National Assembly =

Women are able to be Members of Parliament in France; in the National Assembly. Women have been able to be involved in French legislative political life since 1945.

== History ==
Proportion of women elected to the National Assembly
2024 elections	36.0%
2022 elections	37.3%
2017 elections	38.8%
2012 elections	26.9%
2007 elections	18.5%
2002 elections	12.1%
1997 elections	10.8%
1993 elections	5.9%
1988 elections	5.6%

A record number of women were elected at the 2017 French legislative election and sit as deputies in the 15th National Assembly of France.

== Over time ==
Election	Legislature	Number of women	Total number of deputies	Percentage
October 1945	First Constituent Assembly	33	586	5.6%
June 1946	Second Constituent Assembly	30	586	5.1%
November 1946	1st Parliament (4th Republic)	42	619	6.8%
June 1951	2nd (4th Republic)	22	627	3.5%
January 1956	3rd (4th Republic)	19	627	3.0%
November 1958	1st (5th Republic)	8	579	1.4%
November 1962	2nd (5th Republic)	8	482	1.7%
March 1967	3rd (5th Republic)	11	487	2.6%
June 1968	4th (5th Republic)	10	487	2.1%
March 1973	5th (5th Republic)	12	490	2.4%
March 1978	6th (5th Republic)	21	491	4.3%
June 1981	7th (5th Republic)	36	491	7.3%
March 1986	8th (5th Republic)	34	577	5.9%
June 1988	9th (5th Republic)	33	577	5.7%
March 1993	10th (5th Republic)	35	577	6.1%
May / June 1997	11th (5th Republic)	63	577	10.9%
June 2002	12th (5th Republic)	71	577	12.3%
June 2007	13th (5th Republic)	107	577	18.5%
June 2012	14th (5th Republic)	155	577	26.9%
June 2017	15th (5th Republic)	224	577	38.8%
June 2022	16th (5th Republic)	215	577	37.3%
July 2024	17th (5th Republic)	208	577	36.0%

== List of women MPs ==
=== 1945 ===
Name	Group	Constituency
Denise Bastide	PCF	Loire
Madeleine Braun	PCF	Seine
Germaine Degrond	SFIO	Seine-et-Oise
Marie-Madeleine Dienesch	MRP	Côtes-du-Nord
Eugénie Éboué-Tell	SFIO	Guadeloupe
Germaine François	PCF	Nièvre
Mathilde Gabriel-Péri	PCF	Seine-et-Oise
Émilienne Galicier	PCF	Nord
Denise Ginollin	PCF	Seine
Lucie Guérin	PCF	Seine-Inférieure
Rose Guérin	PCF	Seine
Solange Lamblin	MRP	Seine
Irène Laure	SFIO	Bouches-du-Rhône
Marie-Hélène Lefaucheux	MRP	Aisne
Francine Lefebvre	MRP	Seine
Rachel Lempereur	SFIO	Nord
Madeleine Léo-Lagrange	SFIO	Nord
Jeanne Léveillé	PCF	Oise
Mathilde Méty	PCF	Rhône
Raymonde Tillon	PCF	Bouches-du-Rhône
Marie Oyon	SFIO	Sarthe
Germaine Peyroles	MRP	Seine-et-Oise
Germaine Poinso-Chapuis	MRP	Bouches-du-Rhône
Renée Prévert	MRP	Ille-et-Vilaine
Gilberte Roca	PCF	Gard
Simone Rollin	MRP	Seine
Marcelle Rumeau	PCF	Haute-Garonne
Hélène Solomon-Langevin	PCF	Seine
Alice Sportisse Gomez-Nadal	PCF	Oran
Hélène de Suzannet	PRL	Vendée
Marie Texier-Lahoulle	MRP	Morbihan
Marie-Claude Vaillant-Couturier	PCF	Seine
Jeannette Vermeersch	PCF	Seine

=== 1946 ===
Nom	Groupe	Circonscription
Denise Bastide	PCF	Loire
Henriette Bosquier	MRP	Gard
Madeleine Braun	PCF	Seine
Mariette Brion	PCF	Charente
Gilberte Brossolette	SFIO	Seine
Paulette Charbonnel-Duteil	PCF	Aisne
Germaine Degrond	SFIO	Seine-et-Oise
Marie-Madeleine Dienesch	MRP	Côtes-du-Nord
Eugénie Éboué-Tell	SFIO	Guadeloupe
Germaine François	PCF	Nièvre
Mathilde Gabriel-Péri	PCF	Seine-et-Oise
Émilienne Galicier	PCF	Nord
Denise Ginollin	PCF	Seine
Lucie Guérin	PCF	Seine-Inférieure
Rose Guérin	PCF	Seine
Francine Lefebvre	MRP	Seine
Rachel Lempereur	SFIO	Nord
Mathilde Méty	PCF	Rhône
Hélène Nautré	PCF	Marne
Raymonde Tillon	PCF	Bouches-du-Rhône
Germaine Peyroles	MRP	Seine-et-Oise
Germaine Poinso-Chapuis	MRP	Bouches-du-Rhône
Renée Prévert	MRP	Ille-et-Vilaine
Gilberte Roca	PCF	Gard
Hélène Solomon-Langevin	PCF	Seine
Alice Sportisse Gomez-Nadal	PCF	Oran
Marie Texier-Lahoulle	MRP	Morbihan
Marie-Claude Vaillant-Couturier	PCF	Seine
Jeannette Vermeersch	PCF	Seine
Andrée Viénot	SFIO	Ardennes
Marie-Louise Weber	MRP	Haut-Rhin

=== 2017 French legislative election ===
Party	Portrait	Name	Constituency
La République En Marche!			
Socialist			
Miscellaneous left			
Socialist			
La République En Marche!			
En Commun			
La République En Marche!			
La République En Marche!			
Socialist			
La République En Marche!			
La République En Marche!			
Republican			
Republican			
Union of Democrats and Independents		Maina Sage	French Polynesia's 1st constituency
La République En Marche!		Jennifer de Temmerman	Nord's 15th constituency
La République En Marche!		Agnès Thill	Oise's 2nd constituency
La République En Marche!		Sabine Thillaye	Indre-et-Loire's 5th constituency
La République En Marche!		Valérie Thomas	Puy-de-Dôme's 1st constituency
La République En Marche!		Alice Thourot	Drôme's 2nd constituency
La République En Marche!		Huguette Tiegna	Lot's 2nd constituency
Socialist		Sylvie Tolmont	Sarthe's 4th constituency
La République En Marche!		Élisabeth Toutut-Picard	Haute-Garonne's 7th constituency
Republican		Laurence Trastour-Isnart	Alpes-Maritimes's 6th constituency
La République En Marche!		Frédérique Tuffnell	Charente-Maritime's 2nd constituency
Socialist		Cécile Untermaier	Saône-et-Loire's 4th constituency
Socialist		Hélène Vainqueur-Christophe	Guadeloupe's 4th constituency
Republican		Isabelle Valentin	Haute-Loire's 1st constituency
La République En Marche!		Alexandra Valetta-Ardisson	Alpes-Maritimes's 4th constituency
La République En Marche!		Laurence Vanceunebrock-Mialon	Allier's 2nd constituency
Democratic Movement		Michèle de Vaucouleurs	Yvelines's 7th constituency
La République En Marche!		Marie-Christine Verdier-Jouclas	Tarn's 2nd constituency
Democratic Movement		Laurence Vichnievsky	Puy-de-Dôme's 3rd constituency
La République En Marche!		Annie Vidal	Seine-Maritime's 2nd constituency
La République En Marche!		Corinne Vignon	Haute-Garonne's 3rd constituency
La République En Marche!		Martine Wonner	Bas-Rhin's 4th constituency
La République En Marche!		Hélène Zannier	Moselle's 7th constituency

=== 15th legislature of the French Fifth Republic (mid-term changes) ===
Party	Portrait	Name	Constituency	Year elected	Year left	Reason
La République En Marche!		Séverine Gipson	Eure's 1st constituency	21 July 2017	21 June 2022	Lost seat to Christine Loir
League of the South		Marie-France Lorho	Vaucluse's 4th constituency	21 August 2017		Serving
Socialist		Michèle Victory	Ardèche's 2nd constituency	25 December 2017	21 June 2022	Stood down
Miscellaneous left		Manuéla Kéclard-Mondésir	Martinique's 2nd constituency	23 April 2018		Serving
Socialist		Sylvie Tolmont	Sarthe's 4th constituency	11 July 2018	21 June 2022	Lost seat
La République En Marche!		Florence Provendier	Hauts-de-Seine's 10th constituency	17 November 2018		Serving
Agir		Patricia Lemoine	Seine-et-Marne's 5th constituency	17 November 2018		Serving
En Commun		Bénédicte Pételle	Hauts-de-Seine's 2nd constituency	26 February 2019		Serving
La République En Marche!		Stéphanie Atger	Essonne's 6th constituency	1 May 2019		Serving
La République En Marche!		Florence Morlighem	Nord's 11th constituency	18 January 2020		Serving
Socialist		Claudia Rouaux	Ille-et-Vilaine's 3rd constituency	12 February 2020		Serving
La République En Marche!		Camille Galliard-Minier	Isère's 1st constituency	17 March 2020		Serving
La République En Marche!		Souad Zitouni	Vaucluse's 1st constituency	30 March 2020		Serving
Republican		Sandra Boëlle	Paris's 14th constituency	28 May 2020		Serving
Republican		Nathalie Serre	Rhône's 8th constituency	18 June 2020		Serving
Union of Democrats and Independents		Valérie Six	Nord's 7th constituency	23 June 2020		Serving
Republican		Sylvie Bouchet Bellecourt	Seine-et-Marne's 2nd constituency	23 June 2020		Serving
Socialist		Sarah Taillebois	Val-de-Marne's 9th constituency	24 June 2020	24 June 2020	Stood down
Socialist		Isabelle Santiago	Val-de-Marne's 9th constituency	24 June 2020		Serving
Republican		Elizabeth Marquet	Maine-et-Loire's 3rd constituency	1 August 2020	1 August 2020	Stood down
National Rally		Catherine Pujol	Pyrénées-Orientales's 2nd constituency	3 August 2020		Serving
Republican		Édith Audibert	Var's 3rd constituency	3 August 2020		Serving
Socialist		Chantal Jourdan	Orne's 1st constituency	3 August 2020		Serving
La République En Marche!		Cécile Delpirou	Somme's 2nd constituency	7 August 2020		Serving
La République En Marche!		Françoise Ballet-Blu	Vienne's 1st constituency	25 August 2020		Serving
La République En Marche!		Marie Silin	Paris's 12th constituency	27 August 2020	21 June 2022	Stood down
La République En Marche!		Claire Bouchet	Hautes-Alpes's 2nd constituency	27 August 2020	20 June 2022	Stood down
Republican		Anne-Laure Blin	Maine-et-Loire's 3rd constituency	27 September 2020 (by-election)		Serving
Pour La Réunion		Karine Lebon	Réunion's 2nd constituency	27 September 2020 (by-election)		Serving
Democratic Movement		Maud Gatel	Paris's 11th constituency	14 January 2021		Serving
National Rally		Myriane Houplain	Pas-de-Calais's 10th constituency	22 April 2021	21 June 2022	Lost seat
Socialist		Lamia El Aaraje	Paris's 15th constituency	7 June 2021 (by-election)	28 January 2022	Lost seat
Union of Democrats and Independents		Sophie Métadier	Indre-et-Loire's 3rd constituency	7 June 2021	21 June 2022	Lost seat
La République En Marche!		Catherine Daufès-Roux	Gard's 5th constituency	28 June 2021	21 June 2022	Lost seat
Republican		Bernadette Beauvais	Seine-et-Marne's 6th constituency	28 July 2021	25 August 2021	Resigned
Republican		Christelle Petex-Levet	Haute-Savoie's 3rd constituency	1 August 2021		Serving

=== 16th legislature of the French Fifth Republic ===
- Béatrice Bellamy
- Fanta Berete
- Sophia Chikirou
- Alma Dufour
- Dominique Faure
- Sarah Legrain
- Christine Loir
- Pascale Martin
- Joëlle Mélin
- Nathalie Oziol
- Anna Pic
- Danielle Simonnet

== See also ==
- Women in the House of Commons of the United Kingdom
- Women in the House of Lords
