= Francine Lefebvre =

French politician

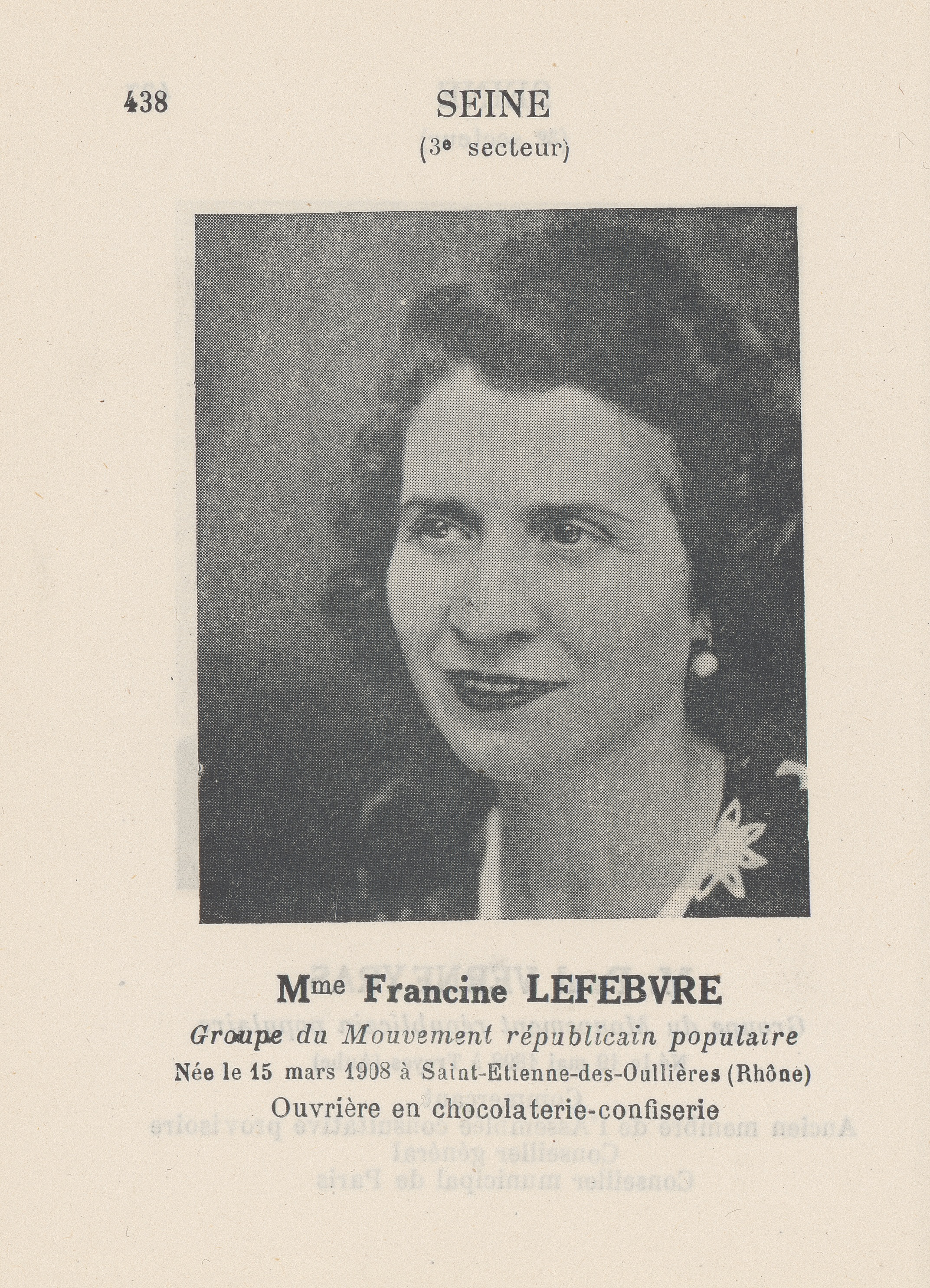

Member of the National Assembly
- In office 1945–1958
- Constituency: Seine

Personal details
- Born: 15 March 1908 Saint-Étienne-des-Oullières, France
- Died: 21 November 1979 (aged 71) Villefranche-sur-Saône, France
- Party: Popular Republican Movement

Francine Lefebvre (15 March 1908 – 16 December 1981) was a French politician. She was elected to the National Assembly in 1945 as one of the first group of French women in parliament. She served in the National Assembly until 1958.

== Biography ==
Lefebvre was born Francine Nicolas in Saint-Étienne-des-Oullières in 1908. She worked in the chocolate industry. Following the liberation of France, she became a Liberation Committee of the 3rd arrondissement of the Seine on behalf of the Popular Republican Movement (MRP).

She was subsequently an MRP candidate in Seine department in the 1945 National Assembly elections. The third-placed candidate on the MRP list, she was elected to parliament, becoming one of the first group of women in the National Assembly. After being elected she became a member of the Civil and Military Pensions and Victims of War and Repression Commission and the Labour and Social Security Commission. She was re-elected in the June 1946 elections, and was sat on the Labour and Social Security and Refueling commissions. After being re-elected again in the November 1946 elections she became vice-president of the MRP parliamentary group. Retaining her place on the Labour and Social Security Commission, she also sat on the Committee on Universal Suffrage, Rules and Petitions Commission, the Interior Commission, the Parliamentary Immunity Commission and the Overseas Territories Commission, and was appointed as a High Court juror.

Lefebvre was re-elected as the head of the MRP list in Seine in 1951 and 1956. In the 1958 elections she stood in the Seine 10th constituency, but failed to be re-elected. She subsequently ran unsuccessfully in the 9th constituency in 1962 and the 2nd constituency in 1967, after which she retired from politics. She died in Villefranche-sur-Saône in 1979.
