= Mathilde Gabriel-Péri =

French politician (1902–1981)

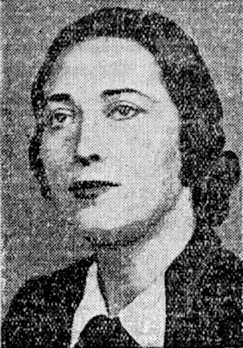

Member of the National Assembly
- In office 1945–1958
- Constituency: Seine-et-Oise

Personal details
- Born: 7 June 1902 Canet-en-Roussillon, France
- Died: 16 December 1981 (aged 79) Paris, France
- Party: French Communist Party
- Relations: Andrée Taurinya (great-niece)

Mathilde Rose Thérèse Gabriel-Péri (7 June 1902 – 16 December 1981) was a French politician. She was elected to the National Assembly in 1945 as one of the first group of French women in parliament. She served in the National Assembly until 1958.

== Biography ==
Gabriel-Péri was born Mathilde Rose Thérèse Taurinya in Canet-en-Roussillon in 1902. Her sister Pauline married André Marty, a leading communist. She married Gabriel Péri, also a communist activist, in 1927. Although he was imprisoned two years later, he was elected to parliament in 1931 and re-elected in 1936. After the Nazi occupation of France, Gabriel-Péri was interred at Rieucros Camp; her husband was executed the following year.

Following the liberation of France, Gabriel-Péri was appointed to the Provisional Consultative Assembly in 1944. She was subsequently a French Communist Party (PCF) candidate in the Seine-et-Oise department in the 1945 National Assembly elections. The first-placed candidate on the PCF list, she was elected to parliament, becoming one of the first group of women in the National Assembly. After being elected, she became a member of the Civil and Military Pensions and Victims of War and Repression Commission and the Supply Commission. She was re-elected in the July 1946 elections and was appointed as a High Court juror in July. Re-elected again in the November 1946 elections, she was made a titular judge in March 1947. She was re-elected in 1951 and 1956, serving in parliament until losing her seat in the 1958 elections.

Gabriel-Péri subsequently retired from politics and died in the Boulogne-Billancourt area of Paris in 1981.
