= Germaine Peyroles =

French politician

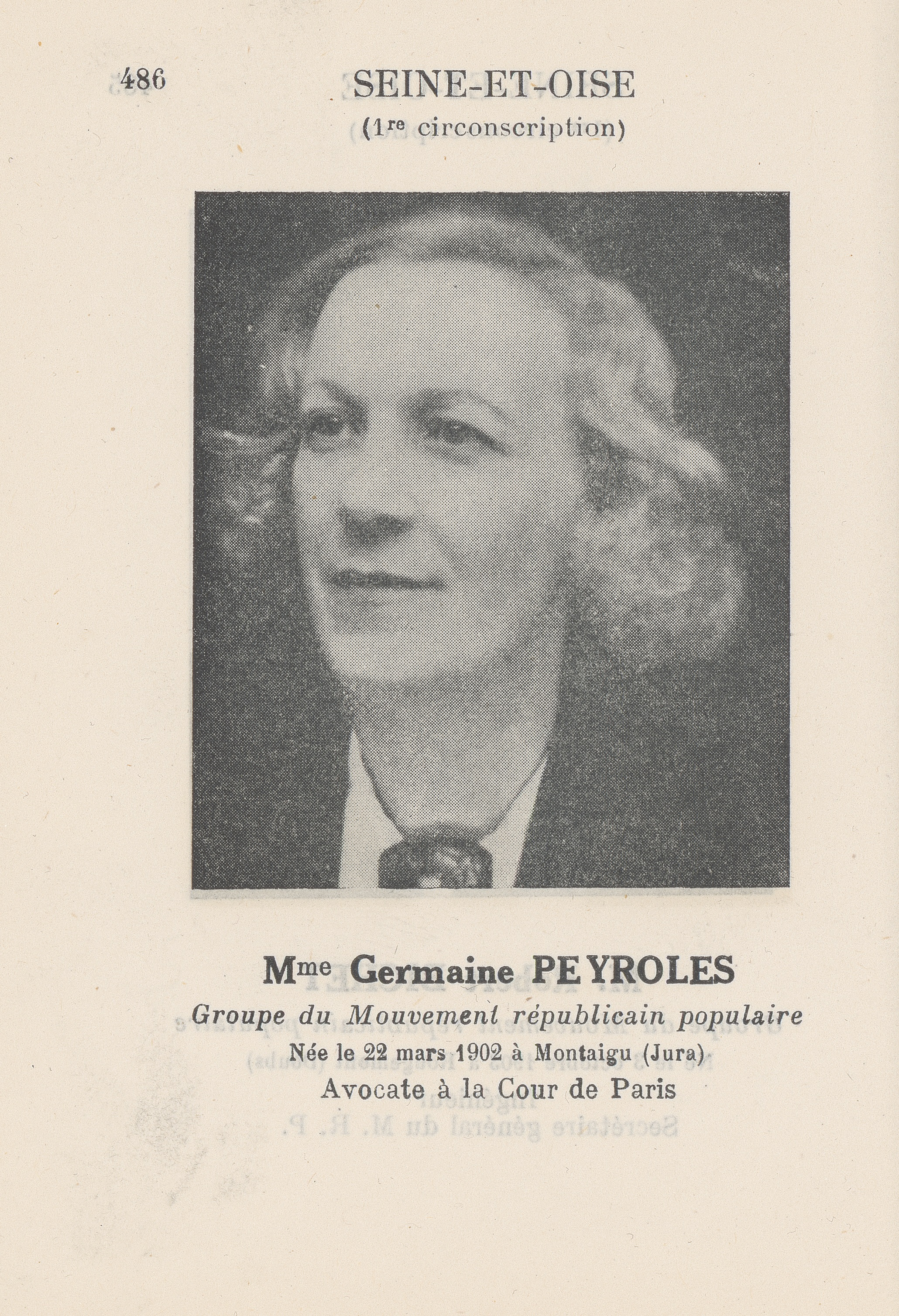

Member of the National Assembly
- In office 1945–1951; 1954–1955
- Constituency: Seine-et-Oise

Personal details
- Born: 22 March 1902 Montaigu, France
- Died: 26 October 1979 (aged 77) Paris, France

Germaine Peyroles (22 March 1902 – 26 October 1979) was a French lawyer and politician. She was elected to the National Assembly in 1945 as one of the first group of French women in parliament. She served in the National Assembly until 1951, and then again from 1954 to 1955.

== Biography ==
Peyrolles was born in Montaigu in Jura. Encouraged by her father, a French teacher, she studied law at university and was one of the first women admitted to the bar in Paris in the late 1920s. After meeting her future husband Georges Peyroles, she joined the Popular Democratic Party and became general secretary of its women's section. The couple had four children, one of whom (Jacques) became a well-known writer under the name Gilles Perrault. During World War II she participated in the French resistance, hosting British airmen in the couple's home and helping them escape to Spain. Following the war, she was awarded the Croix de Guerre.

She was subsequently a Popular Republican Movement (MRP) candidate in Seine-et-Oise department in the October 1945 National Assembly elections. Placed second on the MRP list, she was elected to parliament, becoming one of the first group of women in the National Assembly. She was re-elected in the June and November 1946 elections, and served as Vice-President of the National Assembly from 1946 to 1948 and again in 1951, the first woman to preside over the legislature. She also became a member of the pro-European federation movement La Fédération, serving as its vice president from 1947 to 1958.

Although Peyrolles lost her seat in the 1951 elections, she re-entered parliament after winning a by-election in March 1954, defeating André Stil in the second round. She lost her seat again in the 1956 elections, and unsuccessfully contested Seine-et-Oise's 10th constituency in the 1958 elections. Withdrawing from active politics, she continued to campaign with European Movement International. She died in Paris in 1979.
