= Rose Guérin =

French politician

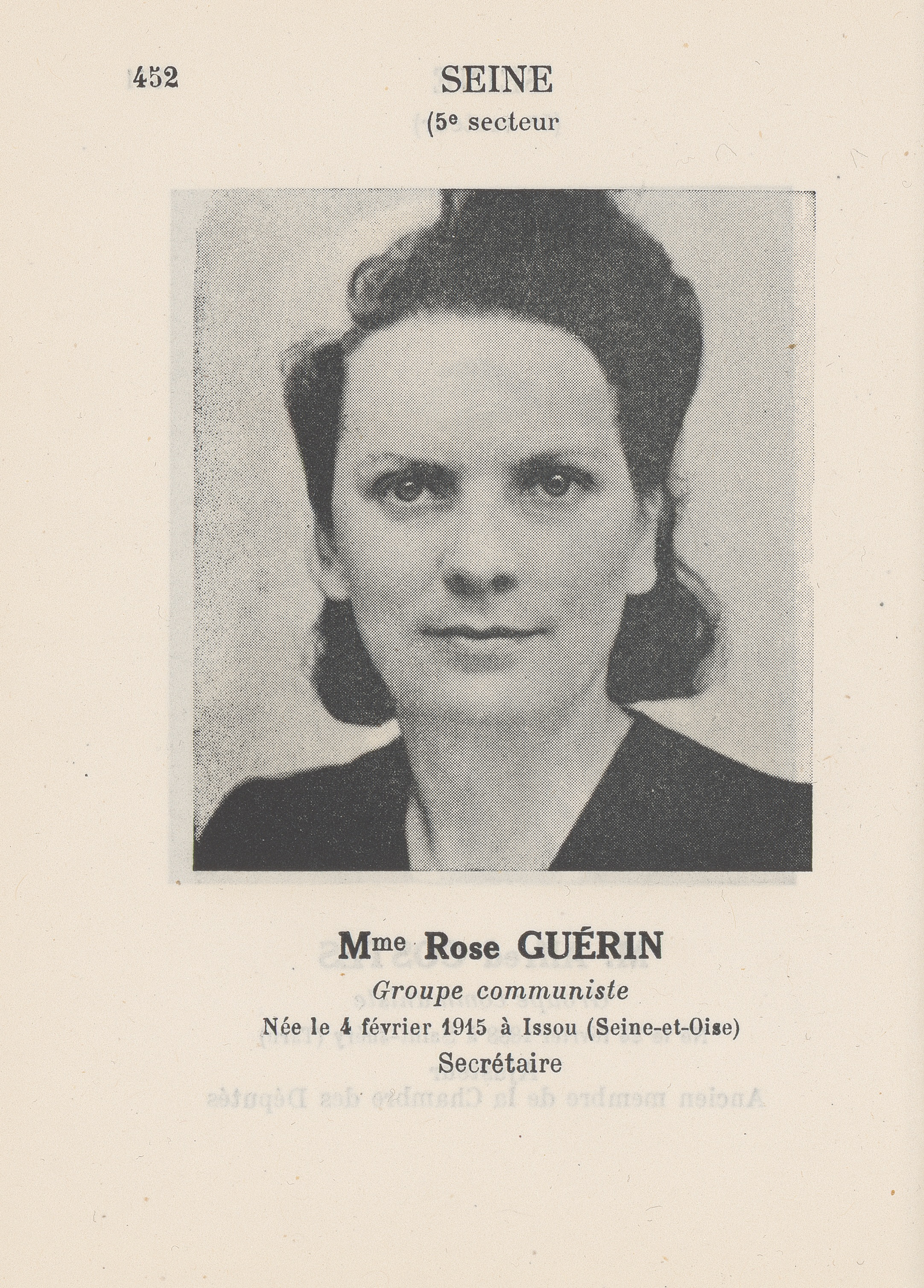

Member of the National Assembly
- In office 1945–1958
- Constituency: Seine

Personal details
- Born: 4 February 1915 Issou, France
- Died: 20 September 1998 (aged 83) Paris, France

Rose Guérin (4 February 1915 – 20 September 1998) was a French politician. She was elected to the National Assembly in 1945 as one of the first group of French women in parliament, serving in parliament until 1958.

== Biography ==
Guérin was born Rose Eugénie Marie Anne Bagot in Issou in 1915. She learned shorthand typing and worked for Crédit du Nord from 1932 to 1936, becoming a member of the General Confederation of Labour. In 1934 she married Roger Guérin. From a communist family – her father was elected to the municipal council of Gargenville in 1935 – she joined the French Communist Party (PCF) in 1937, and was sacked the following year after leading a strike. In 1940 Guérin and her husband went into hiding and joined the French resistance. She was arrested in 1942 and jailed in Fresnes and Romainville. Having received a death sentence, she was transferred to Ravensbrück concentration camp and then to Mauthausen concentration camp, from which she was liberated in 1945.

After the war, she became involved in the Fédération nationale des déportés et internés résistants et patriotes. She was a PCF candidate in Seine in the 1945 elections to the National Assembly. Placed third on the PCF list, she was one of 33 women elected. During her first term in parliament she sat on the Finance and Budgetary Control Commission and the Labor and Social Security Commission. She was re-elected in the June 1946 elections, after which she remained a member of the same commissions. She was subsequently re-elected again in November 1946, 1951 and 1956, serving until the 1958 elections.

She died in Paris in 1998.
