= Émilienne Galicier =

French politician (1911–2007)

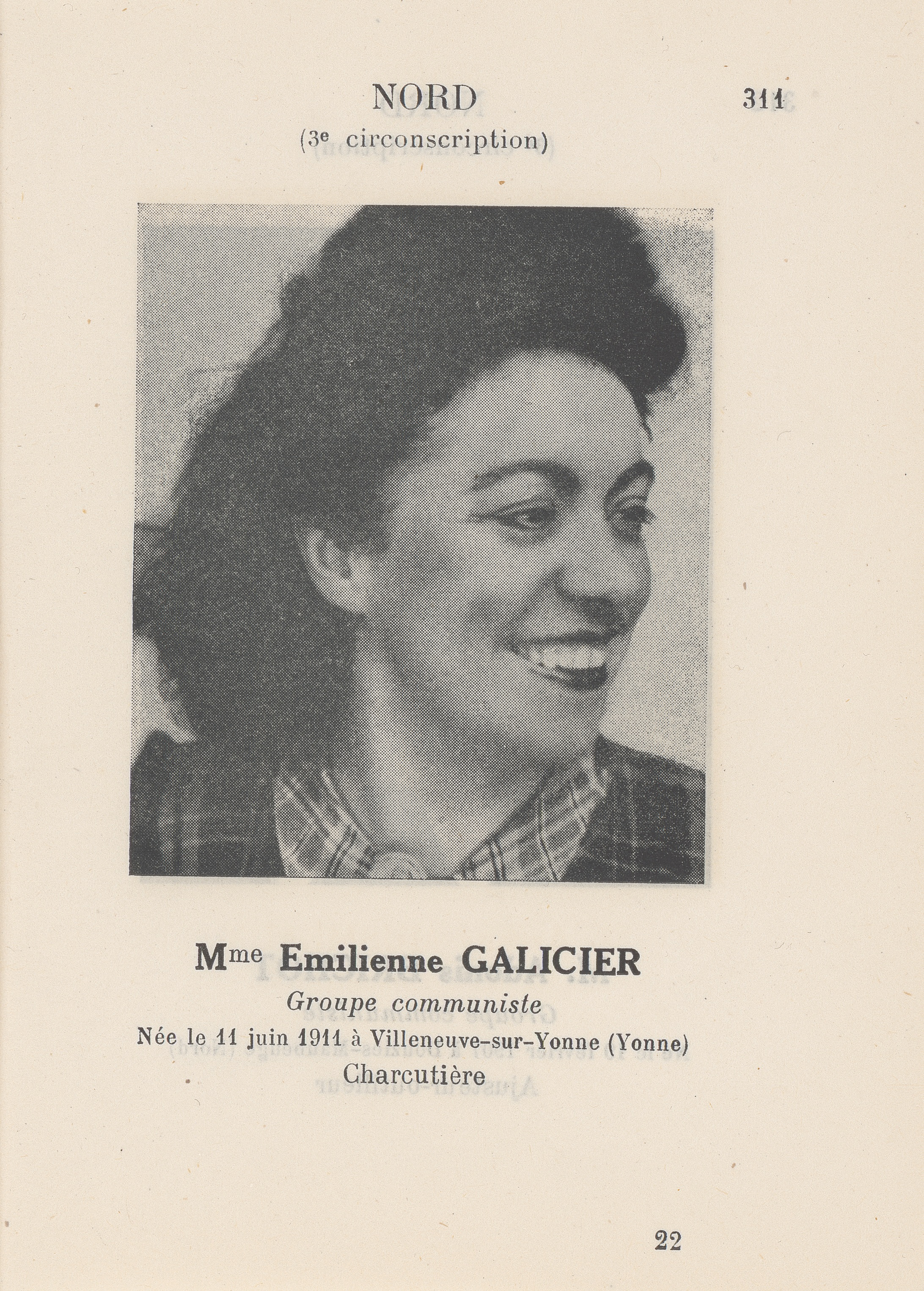

Member of the National Assembly
- In office 1945–1958
- Constituency: Nord

Personal details
- Born: 11 June 1911 Villeneuve-sur-Yonne, France
- Died: 7 July 2007 (aged 96)
- Party: French Communist Party

Émilienne Berthe Galicier (11 June 1911 – 7 July 2007) was a French politician. She was elected to the National Assembly in 1945 as one of the first group of French women in parliament. She served in the National Assembly until 1958.

== Biography ==
Galicier was born in Villeneuve-sur-Yonne in 1911 into a family of winegrowers. She left school aged 11 and worked for a middle-class family and then worked at a factory. Due to unemployment, she left Villeneuve-sur-Yonne in search of work, finding a job in a delicatessen. She became involved in trade union activities, joining a butchers union.

In 1935 she joined the French Communist Party (PCF) and during World War II she was a member of the French Resistance. She was an PCF candidate in Nord department in the 1945 National Assembly elections. As the third-placed candidate on the PCF list, she was elected to parliament, becoming one of the first group of women in the National Assembly. She was re-elected in July 1946, and during her second term in parliament served as a member of the Commission for Reconstruction and War Damages and the Committee for Agriculture and Food Supply. She was re-elected again in November 1946, after which she was a member of the Food Commission and the Press Commission.

Although Galicier was moved down to fourth place on the PCF list for the 1951 elections, she was re-elected and rejoined the same commissions. She was re-elected in 1956, again in fourth place on the PCF list, after which she became a member of the Labour and Social Security Commission. She lost her seat in the 1958 elections, which saw the PCF reduced from 150 to ten seats.
