= Rachel Lempereur =

French politician (1896–1980)

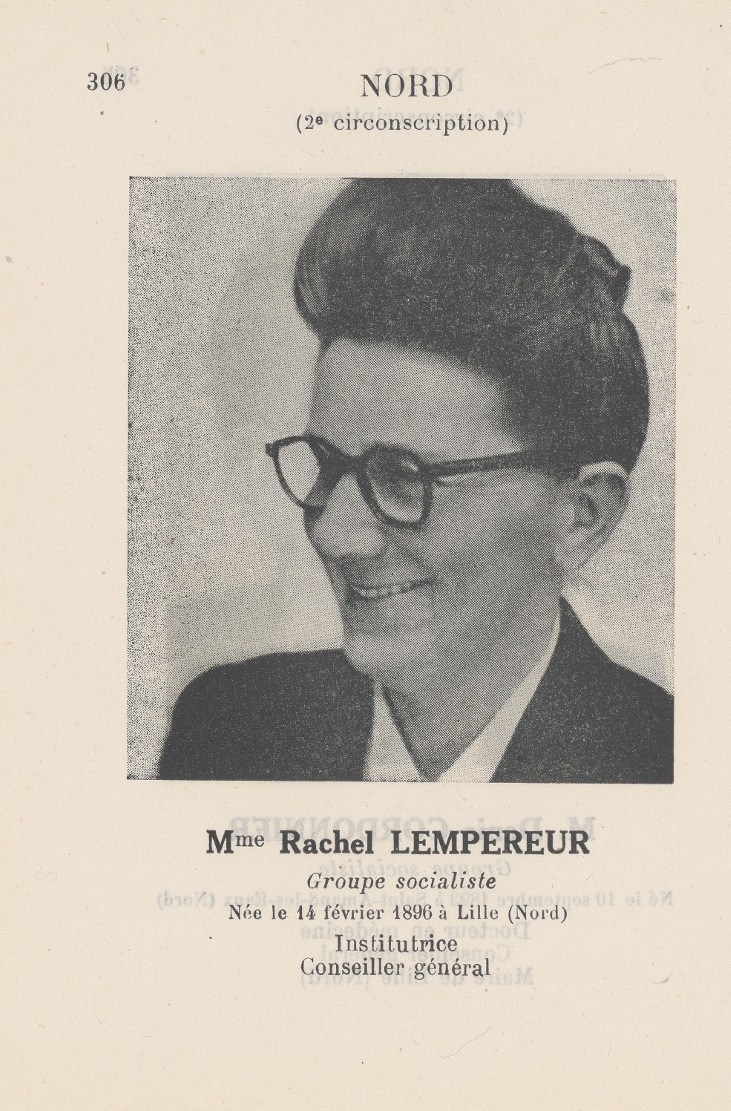

Member of the National Assembly
- In office October 1945 – November 1958
- Constituency: Nord

Personal details
- Born: Rachel Odile Nuez; 14 February 1896 Lille, France
- Died: 8 October 1980 (aged 84) Saint-André-lez-Lille, France
- Party: French Section of the Workers' International
- Children: 2
- Occupation: Teacher, trade unionist and politician

Rachel Odile Lempereur (née Nuez, 14 February 1896 – 8 Octobers 1980) was a French teacher, politician and trade unionist. She was elected to the National Assembly in 1945 as one of the first group of French women in parliament. She served in the National Assembly until 1958.

== Biography ==
Lempereur was born Rachel Odile Nuez in Lille in 1896. She married Marcel Lempereur in 1923 in Liège, Belgium, and they had two daughters together. She worked as a primary school teacher in Lille.

An active trade unionist, Lempereur came to the attention of Jean-Baptiste Lebas, who gave her responsibility for socialist propaganda amongst workers in Nord department. She also became a contributor to La Femme socialiste and in 1939 was elected to the National Committee of Socialist Women. She was also an activist in the Human Rights League.

During the Nazi occupation of France, Lempereur was a director of a school, clandestinely managing the teachers' union and supporting the French resistance.

Following the war, Lempereur became a politician on behalf of the French Section of the Workers' International (SFIO). In 1945 she was elected to the council of Lille Sud-Est canton. She was subsequently an SFIO candidate in Nord department in the October 1945 National Assembly elections. The third-placed candidate on the SFIO list, she was elected to parliament, becoming one of the first group of women in the National Assembly and one of the first three women from the North elected as deputies.

After being elected, she became a member of the National Education and Fine Arts Commission and the Family and Population Commission. She was re-elected in the June 1946, November 1946, 1951 and 1956 elections. During her election campaigns, Lempereur would urge women to vote for the SFIO as they had a "proven" track record on social affairs. Focussing largely on educational issues while in office, she remained a member of the National Education Commission, serving as its vice president from 1946 to 1958 and then president from 1956 to 1958. She additionally was president of the Finance Committee from 1956.

In the 1958 elections Lempereur contested Nord's 2nd constituency, but was defeated by Henri Duterne of the Union for the New Republic. She ran unsuccessfully again in 1962, 1967 and 1968. She was expelled from the Socialist Party (PS) in 1973 after running against joint PS–French Communist Party candidate Gérard Thieffry in the cantonal elections.

Lempereur died in Saint-André-lez-Lille in 1980.
