= Denise Bastide =

French politician

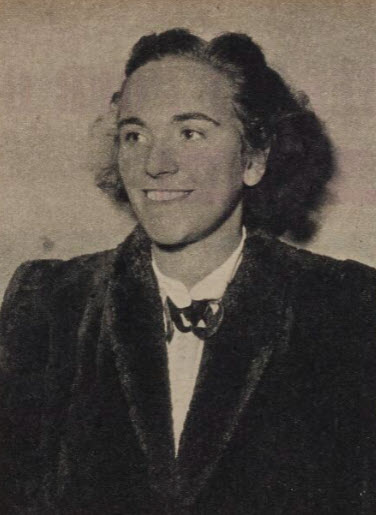

Member of the National Assembly
- In office 1945–1952
- Constituency: Loire

Personal details
- Born: Eva Marie Denise Simon; 23 December 1916 Aurillac, France
- Died: 1 March 1952 (aged 35) Paris, France
- Party: French Communist Party

Eva Marie Denise Bastide (née Simon; 23 December 1916 – 1 March 1952) was a French politician. She was elected to the National Assembly in 1945 as one of the first group of French women to enter parliament. She served in the National Assembly until her death in 1952.

== Biography ==
Eva Marie Denise Simon was born in Aurillac in 1916 into a family of trade unionists. She began training to be a nurse, but left the course to become an activist in the French Communist Party (PCF). She married the cabinetmaker Joseph Bastide and the couple had a daughter; they divorced in 1946. After the relationship with Bastide ended, she had two children with the communist politician Georges Gosnat. Their son Pierre also became a politician and served in the National Assembly.

During the Nazi occupation, she became involved in the National Front. After being arrested in April 1943, she was sentenced to six years in prison in March 1944. Initially imprisoned in Chalons-sur-Marne and Romainville, she was later transferred to Ravensbrück and Zwodau concentration camps. Although she was freed by the allies, the time in the camps seriously affected her health.

Bastide was a PCF candidate in the 1945 elections, placed second on the party's list in Loire, and was one of the 33 women elected to the National Assembly. After being elected, she joined the Family, Population and Public Health Commission. Retaining second place on the PCF list, she was re-elected in the June and November 1946 elections, remaining a member of the Family, Population and Public Health Commission until 1949, also sitting on the Justice and Legislation Commission and the Work and Social Security Commission.

Although she was re-elected again in June 1951, she committed suicide in March the following year.
