= June 1946 French legislative election in Ivory Coast =

Elections to the French National Assembly was held in the territory of Ivory Coast (which included Upper Volta at the time) on 2 June 1946 as part of the wider parliamentary elections. Voting was carried out using separate electoral colleges for citizens and non-citizens. André Schock and Félix Houphouët-Boigny were elected.

== Results ==
=== First College ===
Candidate	Party	First round		Second round	
Candidate	Party	Votes	%	Votes	%
François Reste de Roca	Radical Socialist Party	694	26.30	857	35.99
André Schock	Independent	592	22.43	1,101	46.24
Jousselin	Independent	316	11.97		
Raquin	Independent	299	11.33	387	16.25
Philippe Franceschi	Independent	245	9.28		
Abdoulaye N'Diaye	Independent	244	9.25	2	0.08
Jean Rose	French Communist Party	134	5.08	32	1.34
Roumens	Popular Republican Movement	104	3.94	1	0.04
Daniel Godard	Independent	11	0.42	1	0.04
Total		2,639	100.00	2,381	100.00
Valid votes		2,639	98.69	2,381	98.67
Invalid/blank votes		35	1.31	32	1.33
Total votes		2,674	100.00	2,413	100.00
Registered voters/turnout		4,271	62.61	4,553	53.00
Source: French National Assembly, Sternberger et al.

=== Second College ===
Candidate	Votes	%
Félix Houphouët-Boigny	21,099	91.75
Kouamé Binzème	829	3.61
Maurice Sillaret	758	3.30
Tidiane Dem	309	1.34
Total	22,995	100.00
Valid votes	22,995	95.84
Invalid/blank votes	999	4.16
Total votes	23,994	100.00
Registered voters/turnout	37,888	63.33
Source: Sternberger et al.
