= Renée Prévert =

French politician

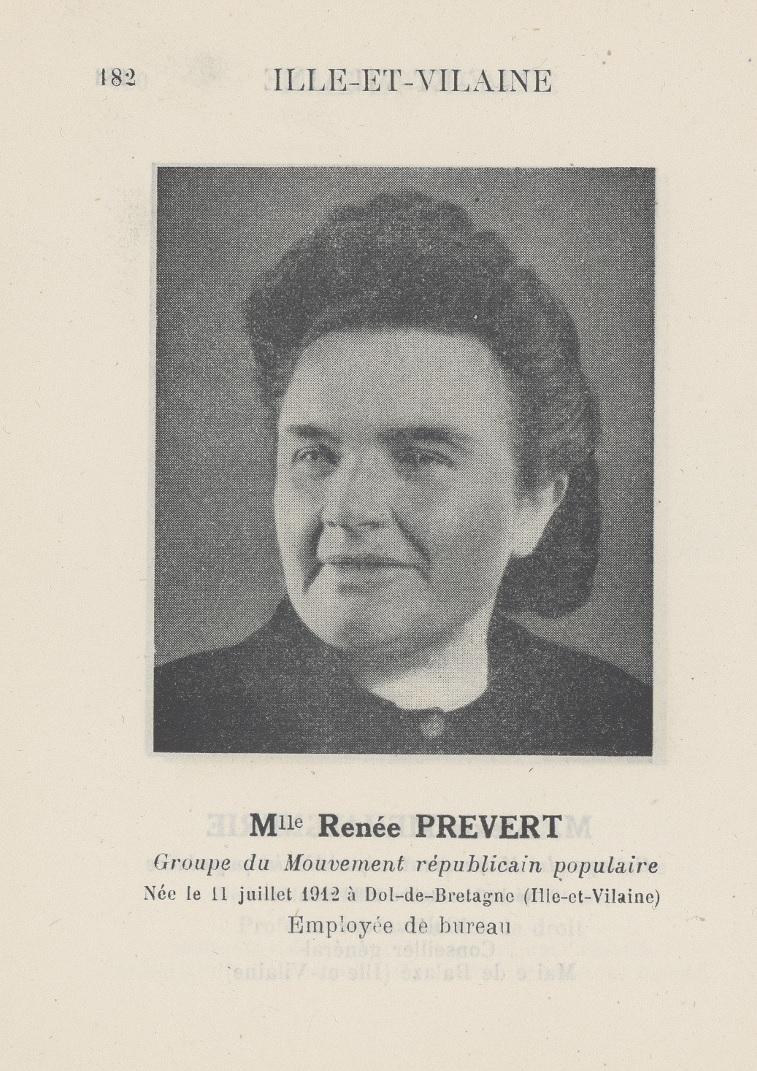

Member of the National Assembly
- In office 1945–1951
- Constituency: Ille-et-Vilaine

Personal details
- Born: 11 July 1912 Dol-de-Bretagne, France
- Died: 23 November 1988 (aged 76) Rennes, France
- Party: Popular Republican Movement

Renée Prévert (11 July 1912 – 23 November 1988) was a French politician. She was elected to the National Assembly in 1945 as one of the first group of French women in parliament. She served in the National Assembly until 1951.

== Biography ==
Prévert was born in Dol-de-Bretagne in 1912, the daughter of a housekeeper and a labourer. She attended Notre-Dame school in her hometown, after which she obtained a Certificate of Professional Aptitute in accountancy and began working as a bookkeeper for a small business. In 1929 she joined the Young Christian Workers, and from 1935 to 1939 was a member of the French Confederation of Christian Workers.

In 1945 she joined the Popular Republican Movement (MRP). She was elected to Rennes municipality in the May 1945 municipal elections, becoming deputy mayor for social affairs. Later in the year she was an MRP candidate in Ille-et-Vilaine department in the October 1945 National Assembly elections. The third-placed candidate on the MRP list, she was elected to parliament, becoming one of the first group of women in the National Assembly. She was re-elected in third place on the MRP list in the July 1946 and November 1946 elections.

Prévert did not stand for re-election to the National Assembly in 1951 and she also stood down from Rennes municipality in 1953. However, she successfully ran again in the 1955 municipal elections, serving until 1977. She died in 1988.
