= Simone Rollin =

French politician

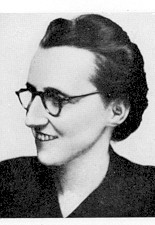

Member of the National Assembly
- In office 1945–1946
- Constituency: Seine

Member of the Council of the Republic
- In office 1946–1948
- Constituency: Seine

Personal details
- Born: 5 September 1910 Montendre, France
- Died: 7 February 1991 (aged 80) La Grande-Motte, France

Simone Rollin (5 September 1910 – 7 February 1991) was a French trade unionist and politician. As vice-president of the Popular Republican Movement, she was elected to the National Assembly in October 1945, becoming one of the first group of French women in parliament. She served in the National Assembly until June the following year, and later served in the Council of the Republic from 1946 to 1948.

== Biography ==
Rollin was born Simone Norbert in Montendre in 1910; her mother was a seamstress, while her father worked as a mechanic in a Renault factory. She began work after leaving primary school. Working as a garment handler, she became involved in trade unions at the age of 17. When she married in 1930, she established the Family Workers' Movement and served as its president until shortly before the Liberation of France. During the Nazi occupation she participated in the French resistance, meeting women who would later join her in the Popular Republican Movement (MRP). At the founding congress of the MRP in 1944, she was chosen as its vice president.

She was subsequently an MRP candidate in Seine department in the October 1945 National Assembly elections, and was elected to parliament, becoming one of the first group of women in the National Assembly. Although she lost her seat in the June 1946 elections, she was elected to the Council of the Republic in December 1946, serving in the upper house until November 1948.

A mother of six, Rollin died in La Grande-Motte in 1991.
