= Marie Texier-Lahoulle =

French politician (1889–1972)

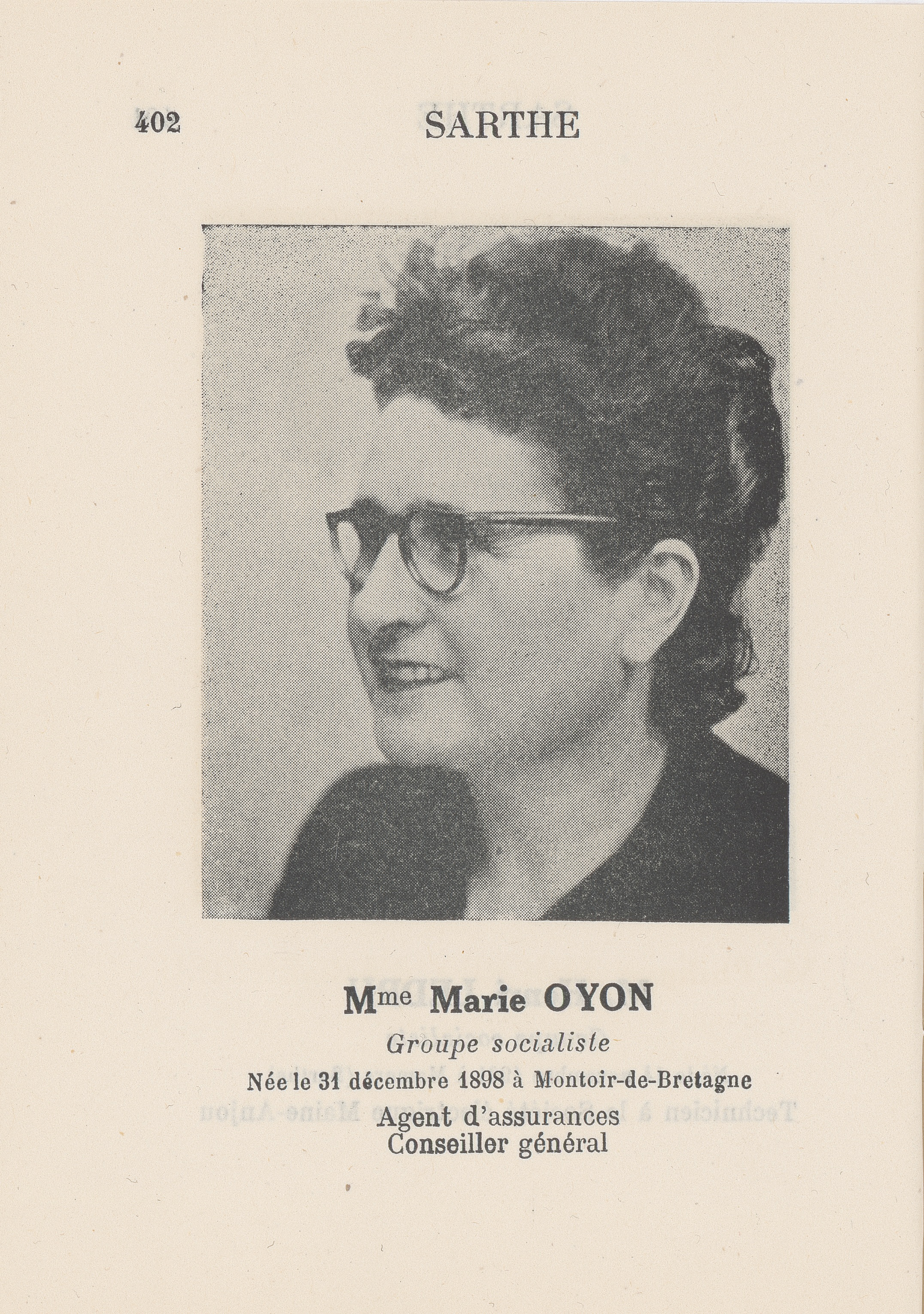

Member of the National Assembly
- In office 1945–1946
- Constituency: Morbihan

Personal details
- Born: 22 July 1889 Auray, France
- Died: 10 September 1972 (aged 83) Vannes, France

Marie Rosalie Joséphine Texier-Lahoulle (22 July 1889 – 10 September 1972) was a French politician. She was elected to the National Assembly in October 1945 as one of the first group of French women in parliament, and served in the National Assembly until November the following year.

== Biography ==
Marie Lahoulle was born in Auray in 1901. She married Ernest Texier, a notary and brother of army general Alfred-René Texier. The couple had two children, both of whom died for France. Following the liberation of France in 1944, Lahoulle became president of the Morbihan branch of the Union féminine civique et sociale, which was associated with the Popular Republican Movement (MRP).

Texier-Lahoulle was an MRP candidate in Morbihan department in the October 1945 National Assembly elections, and was elected to parliament, becoming one of the first group of women in the National Assembly. A member of the Civil and Military Pensions Commission, she was re-elected in the June 1946 elections, but lost her seat in the November 1946 election.

In 1950 Texier-Lahoulle joined the Rally of the French People (RPF) due to her support for Charles de Gaulle. She resigned from the party in 1953 in an effort to create a joint MRP–RPF list for the municipal elections that year. She died in Vannes in 1972.
