= Germaine François =

French politician

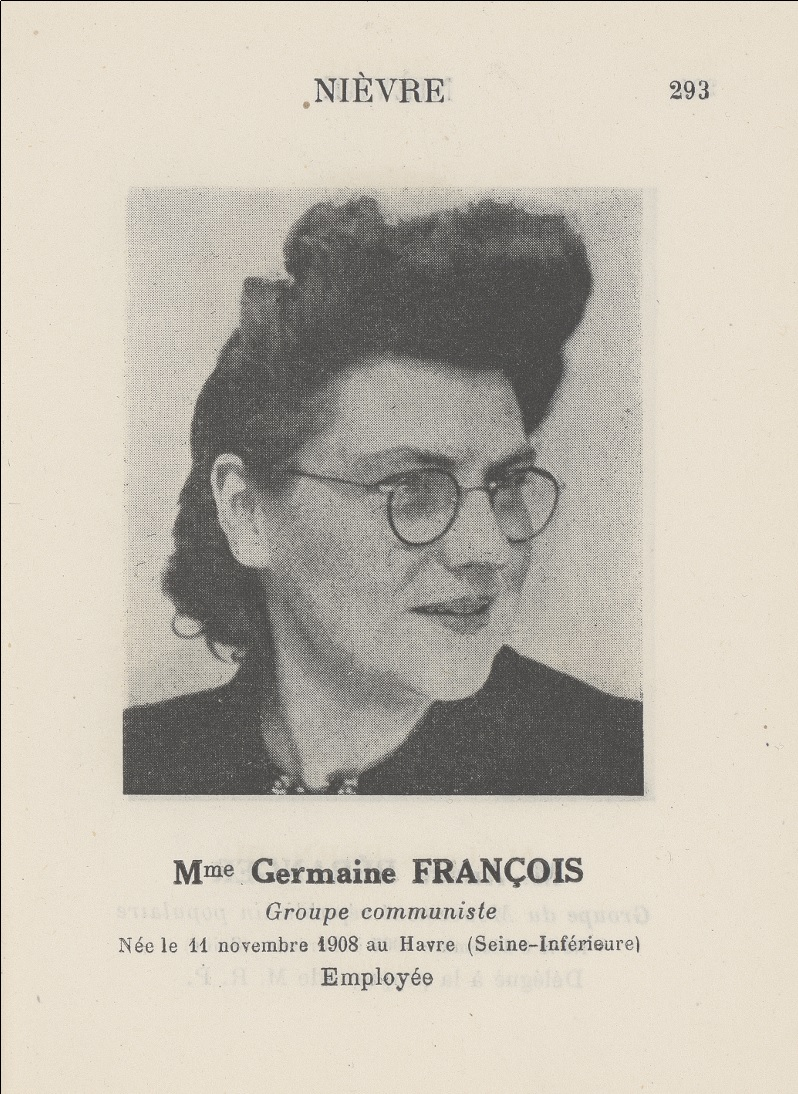

Member of the National Assembly
- In office 1945–1956
- Constituency: Nièvre

Personal details
- Born: 11 November 1908 Le Havre, France
- Died: 23 February 1970 (aged 61) Paris, France
- Party: French Communist Party

Germaine François (11 November 1908 – 23 February 1970) was a French politician. She was elected to the National Assembly in 1945 as one of the first group of French women in parliament. She served in the National Assembly until 1956.

== Biography ==
François was born in Le Havre in 1908. During World War II she was a member of the French resistance. After the war she was elected to the municipal council of Nevers.

She was a French Communist Party (PCF) candidate in Nièvre department in the 1945 National Assembly elections. The second-placed candidate on the PCF list, she was elected to parliament, becoming one of the first group of women in the National Assembly. She was re-elected in the July 1946 elections and served on the Justice and General Legislation during her first and second terms. She headed the PCF list in Nièvre in the November 1946 elections, after which she became a member of the Family, Population and Public Health Commission. She was re-elected again in 1951, but did not stand in the 1956 elections due to poor health and the need to care for her daughter due to her husband's ill health.

François died in the 13th arrondissement of Paris in 1970.
