= June 1946 French legislative election in French Somaliland =

Election in French Somaliland on 2 June 1946

Elections to the French National Assembly were held in French Somaliland on 2 June 1946, with a second round on 16 June as part of the wider parliamentary elections. René Bernard-Cothier was re-elected as the territory's MP.

== Results ==
Candidate	First round		Second round	
Candidate	Votes	%	Votes	%
René Bernard-Cothier	423	44.81	577	59.79
Raimond Lombardo	343	36.33		
Marc Fontaine	92	9.75		
Pierre Hamo	86	9.11	44	4.56
Jean-Carles Martine			301	31.19
Hali Mahmoud			43	4.46
Total	944	100.00	965	100.00
Valid votes	944	97.93	965	98.97
Invalid/blank votes	20	2.07	10	1.03
Total votes	964	100.00	975	100.00
Registered voters/turnout	1,514	63.67	1,514	64.40
Source: Sternberger et al.
