= Denise Ginollin =

French politician

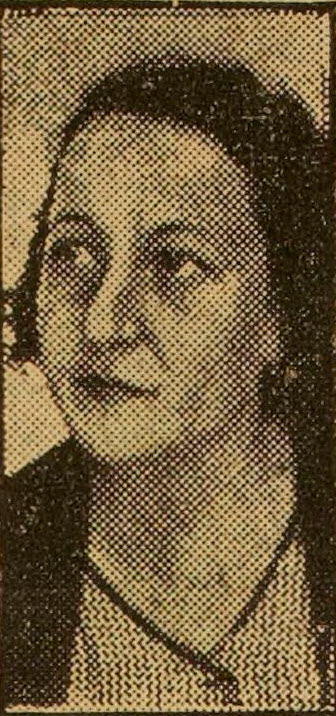

Member of the National Assembly
- In office 1945–1951
- Constituency: Seine

Personal details
- Born: 30 July 1907; Paris, France
- Died: 9 April 1961 (aged 53); Le Plessis-Robinson, France

Denise Ginollin (30 July 1907 – 9 April 1961) was a French politician. She was elected to the National Assembly in 1945 as one of the first group of French women in parliament, serving in the National Assembly until 1951.

== Biography ==
Ginollin was born Denise Reydet in the 12th arrondissement of Paris in 1908, the daughter of Théophile Reydet and Georgine Pauline Avrillon, who married the following year. After leaving primary school she worked at the Paris-France company as a typist until 1935, when she joined the headquarters of the Jeunes Communistes. By the following year she had become secretary of its 12th arrondissement branch. She married Robert Riquet in 1927, and Frédéric Ginollin in December 1939.

In June 1940 Ginollin was arrested by the Vichy authorities while preparing articles for delivery to the printer of L'Humanité the newspaper of the French Communist Party (PCF). She was released five days later, after which the PCF instructed her to regroup the party in Paris. After being involved with the French resistance, she was sentenced to death by a military court in August 1943. Her sentence was subsequently commuted to hard labour in Germany, and in September she was deported to Hinzert prison, before being transferred to Ravensbrück and later Mauthausen concentration camps.

After being liberated, Ginollin returned to France and was a PCF candidate in Seine in the 1945 elections to the National Assembly. Placed fourth on the PCF list, she was one of 33 women elected. She was re-elected in the June and November 1946 elections. In December 1946 she became vice president of the Supply Commission and also served as a juror at the High Court. She remained in the National Assembly until the 1951 elections, which she did not contest. During her time in parliament she put forward 15 bills, including proposals to provide free transport for young people and introduce limits on evictions.

She later married again, after which she took the surname Vulliod. She died in Le Plessis-Robinson in 1961.
