= Lucie Guérin =

French politician

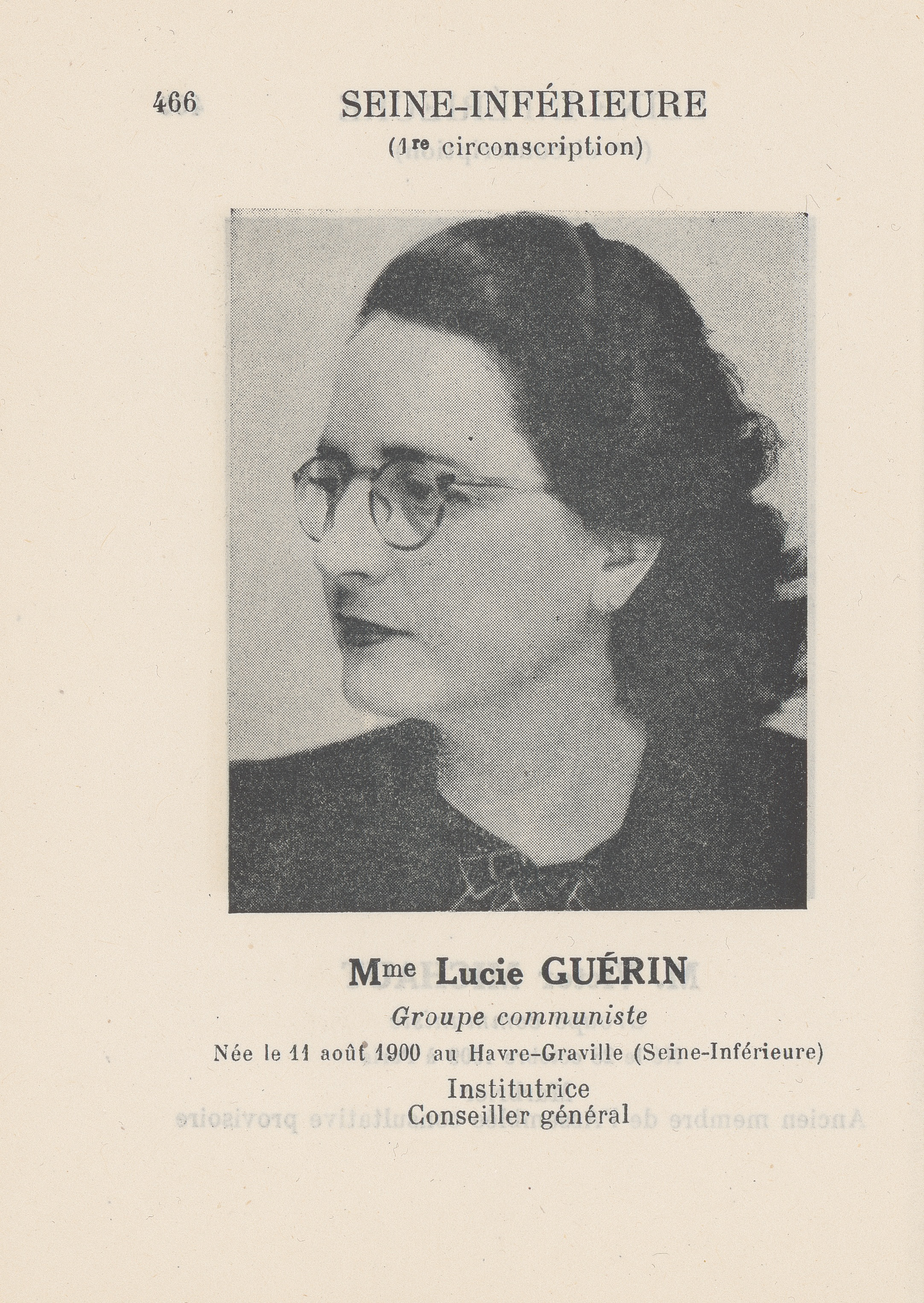

Member of the National Assembly
- In office 1945–1951
- Constituency: Seine-Inférieure

Personal details
- Born: 11 August 1900 Le Havre, France
- Died: 13 June 1973 (aged 72) Fleury-Mérogis, France

Lucie Guérin (11 August 1900 – 13 June 1973) was a French politician. She was elected to the National Assembly in 1945 as one of the first group of French women in parliament. She served in the National Assembly until 1951.

== Biography ==
Guérin was born Lucie Augustine Couillebault in the Graville-Sainte-Honorine area of Le Havre. She married Roger Guérin in 1923, with whom she had two children, and worked as a teacher.

A member of the French Communist Party (PCF), she was part of the French Resistance during World War II. On 1 December 1941 she was arrested by the Nazi authorities and sentenced to eight years of hard labour. She was imprisoned in Rennes until 1944, after which she was transferred to Ravensbrück concentration camp, from which she was liberated in May 1945. However, her daughter Claudine was murdered in Auschwitz concentration camp in 1943.

After the war, Guérin was a PCF candidate in Seine-Inférieure in the 1945 elections to the National Assembly. Placed second on the PCF list, she was one of 33 women elected. She was re-elected in the June and November 1946 elections as the second-placed candidate on the PCF list, serving until losing her seat in the 1951 elections. She also served on the departmental council of Seine-Inférieure from 1945 to 1949, and as a municipal councillor in Rouen from 1953 to 1959, after which she retired.

She died in Fleury-Mérogis in 1973.
