= Léon Deyron =

French politician

Léon Deyron (20 February 1874 - 3 March 1947) was a French politician.

Deyron was born in Constantine, Algeria. He represented the Radical Party in the Constituent Assembly elected in 1945.
