= Jeanne Léveillé =

French politician

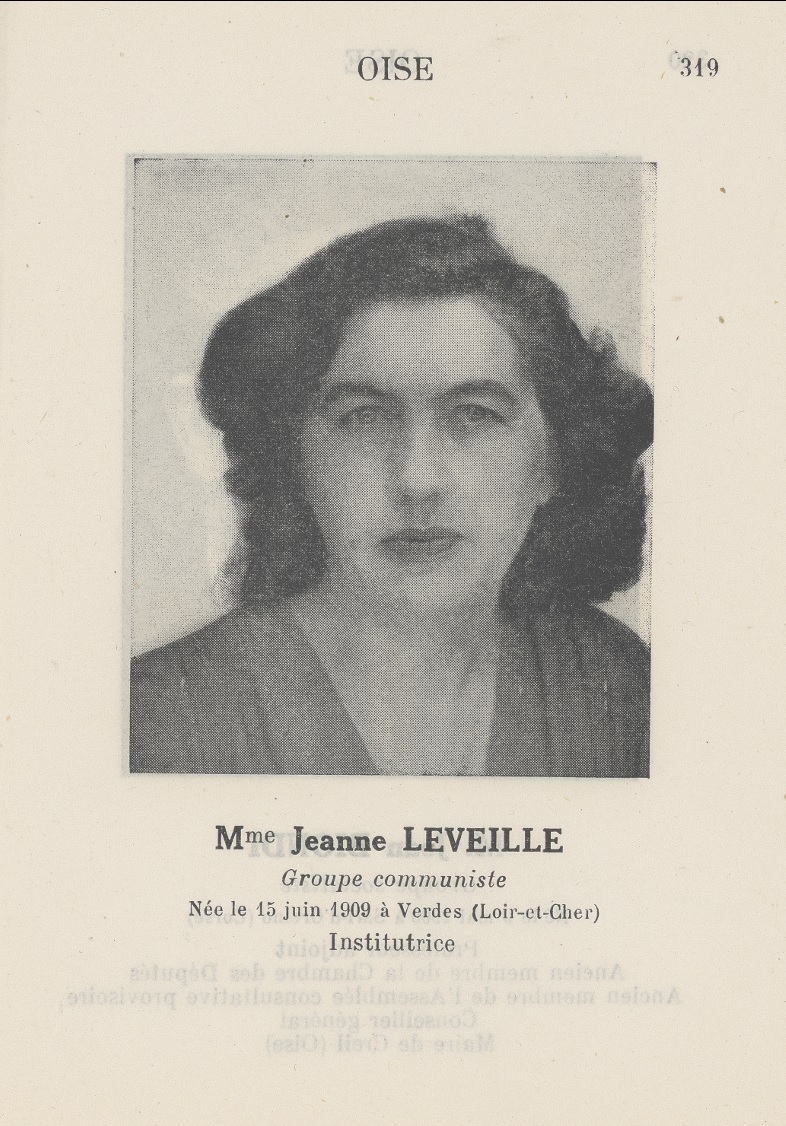

Member of the National Assembly
- In office 1945–1946
- Constituency: Oise

Personal details
- Born: 15 June 1909 Verdes, France
- Died: 5 August 2002 (aged 93)

Jeanne Léveillé (15 June 1909 – 5 August 2002) was a French politician. She was elected to the National Assembly in October 1945 as one of the first group of French women in parliament. She served in the National Assembly until June the following year.

== Biography ==
Léveillé was born Jeanne Assassin in Verdes in 1909, the daughter of teachers. She also became a teacher, teaching in Nogent-sur-Oise and Thiescourt, and married a fellow teacher Eugène Leveillé in August 1932. Having joined the French Communist Party (PCF), she was sacked by the school she worked for in May 1940 due to her activism. Her husband participated in the French resistance and was arrested and executed by Germans in 1944.

Following the liberation, Léveillé was a PCF candidate in Oise department in the October 1945 National Assembly elections. The second-placed candidate on the PCF list, she was elected to parliament, becoming one of the first group of women in the National Assembly. After being elected she became a member of the Justice and General Legislation Commission, but never spoke or tabled a motion in parliament. She did not run for re-election in the June 1946 elections.

She married Remy Asselin in 1946, but he died in May 1948. Léveillé died in 2002.
