= Alice Sportisse Gomez-Nadal =

French politician

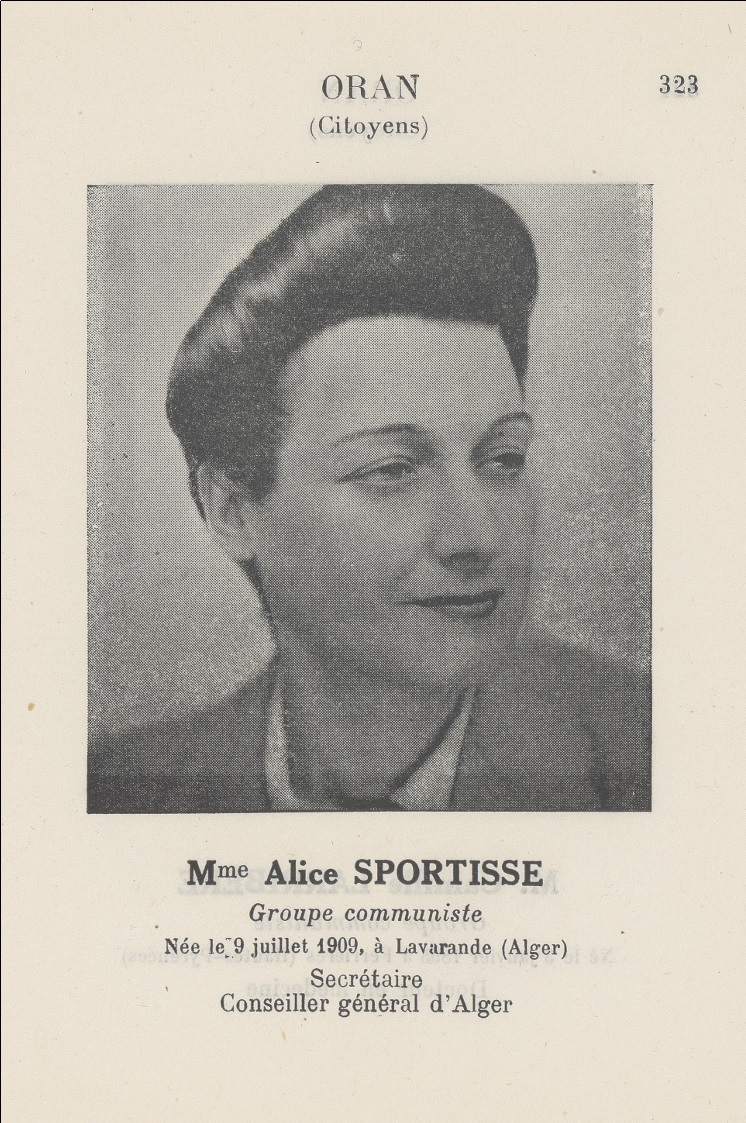
Alice Sportisse, 1946

Alice Sportisse Gomez-Nadal (9 July 1909 - 3 June 1996) was a French-Algerian politician.

She was born in Sidi Lakhdar, Algeria (then known as Lavarande). She represented the Algerian Communist Party (PCA) in the Constituent Assembly elected in 1945, in the Constituent Assembly elected in 1946 and in the National Assembly from 1946 to 1955.
