= Mathilde Méty =

French politician (1895–1974)

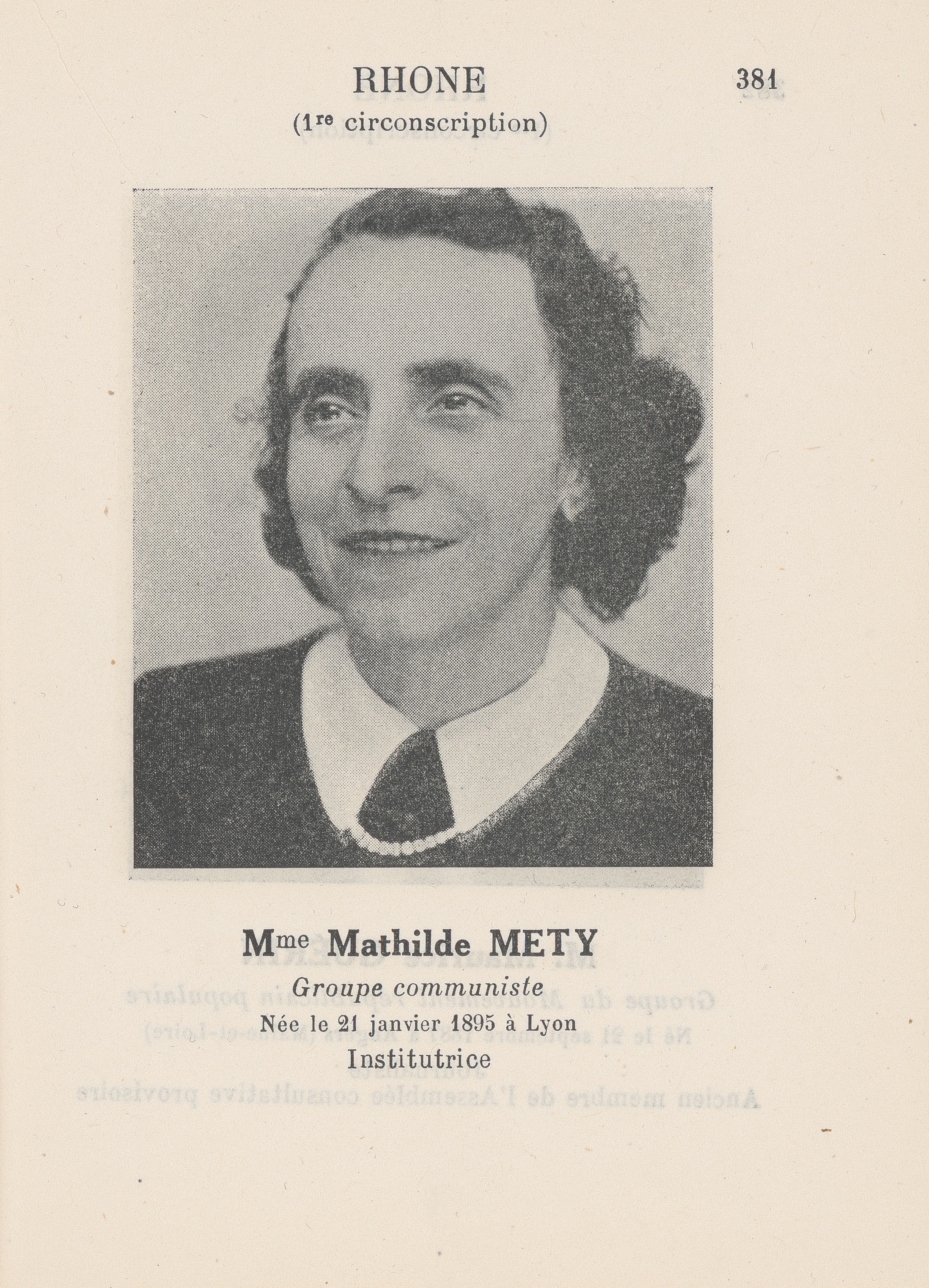

Member of the National Assembly
- In office 1945–1949
- Succeeded by: Auguste Hugonnier
- Constituency: Rhône

Personal details
- Born: 21 January 1895 Lyon, France
- Died: 6 June 1974 (aged 79) Toulon, France

Mathilde Méty (21 January 1895 – 6 June 1974) was a French politician. She was elected to the National Assembly in October 1945 as one of the first group of 33 women to enter parliament. She served in the National Assembly until 1949.

== Biography ==
Mathilde Toinard was born in Lyon in 1895, one of six children. She studied at the Normal School in Lyon, qualifying as a teacher in 1913. Two years later she married a colleague Arthur Méty, who was also active in the Syndicat national des instituteurs. At the end of the 1920s the couple were teaching in a village in Rhône, but Arthur's involvement with the French Communist Party (PCF) led to local residents creating a petition to remove him from the school, and the couple were forced to leave, moving to Givors. After Arthur's death, Méty joined the Communist Party in 1936.

During World War II Méty was involved with the French resistance in the Lyon area. Following the liberation, she was a PCF candidate in Rhône department in the October 1945 National Assembly elections. The third-placed candidate on the PCF list, she was elected to parliament, becoming one of the first group of women in the National Assembly. After entering parliament, she sat on the Family, Population and Public Health Committee. She was re-elected in the June 1946 elections, after which she became a member of the Commission for Justice and General Legislation Committee and retained her place on the Family, Population and Public Health Committee. She was re-elected again in the November 1946 elections and became a member of the Refueling and Communication committees. However, she resigned from the National Assembly in January 1949. She subsequently moved to southern France, where her daughter lived. She died in Toulon in 1974.
