= Gilberte Roca =

French politician and member of the Resistance (1911–2004)

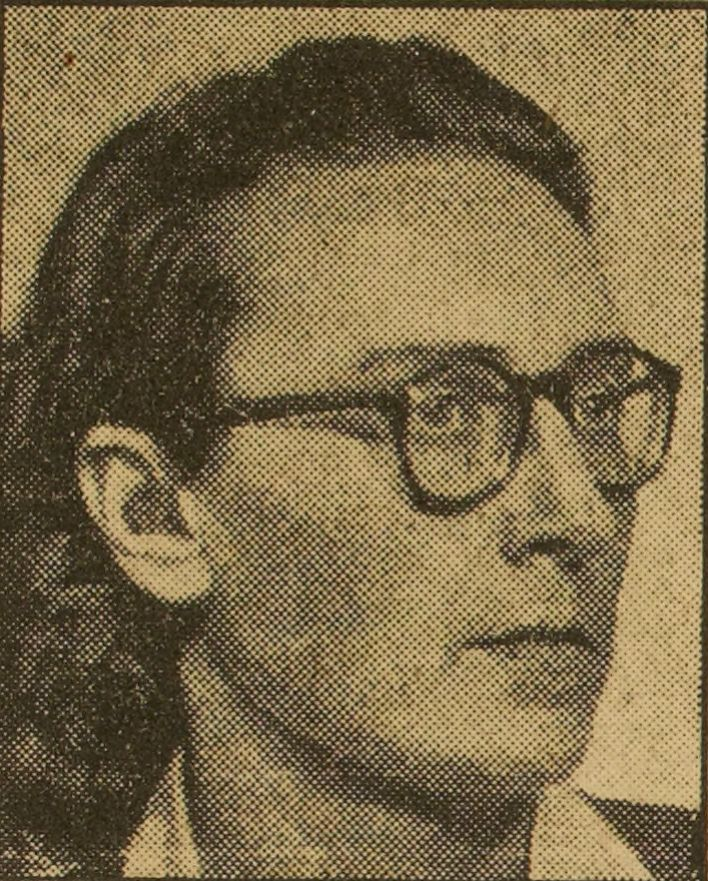
- Gilbert Roca in 1946

Member of French Parliament
- In office 1962–1963
- Preceded by: Jean Poudevigne
- Succeeded by: Jean Poudevigne
- Constituency: Gard's 2nd constituency

Municipal Councilor
- In office 1959–1977
- Constituency: Nîmes

Member of French Parliament
- In office 1946–1958
- Constituency: Gard

Departmental Councilor
- In office 1945–1949
- Constituency: Canton de Nîmes-3

Personal details
- Born: Gilberte Cau; 18 February 1911 Cailhau
- Died: 26 July 2004 (aged 93) Nîmes
- Party: French Communist Party
- Spouse: Edmond Roca

Gilberte Roca née Cau (18 February 1911, Cailhau — 26 July 2004, Nîmes) was a French Communist politician and member of the Resistance.

== Biography ==
Originally from a poor family of agricultural workers, Gilberte Roca was an early adopter of politics. She joined the French Communist Party (PCF) and the Union des jeunes filles de France (UJFF) in 1934. She lived in Capestang then moved to Nîmes. It was then that she became a shorthand typist for the Gard departmental union of the General Confederation of Labour and married Edmond Roca — a communist figure of the region.

During the Second World War, Gilberte joined the Resistance, while her husband, Edmond, was taken prisoner from 1940 to 1945.

At the end of the war, she became the departmental councilor for Canton de Nîmes-3. Then, in 1946, she was elected for MP for Gard at the National Constituent Assembly. She was reelected until 1956, but defeated in the 1958 elections. She was reelected in 1962, but only held that office for a year; a by-election was held, which Jean Poudevigne won. On top of that, she was a municipal councilor from 1959 to 1977.

After her retirement from politics, she died on 26 July 2004 in Nîmes.
