= Hélène de Suzannet =

French politician

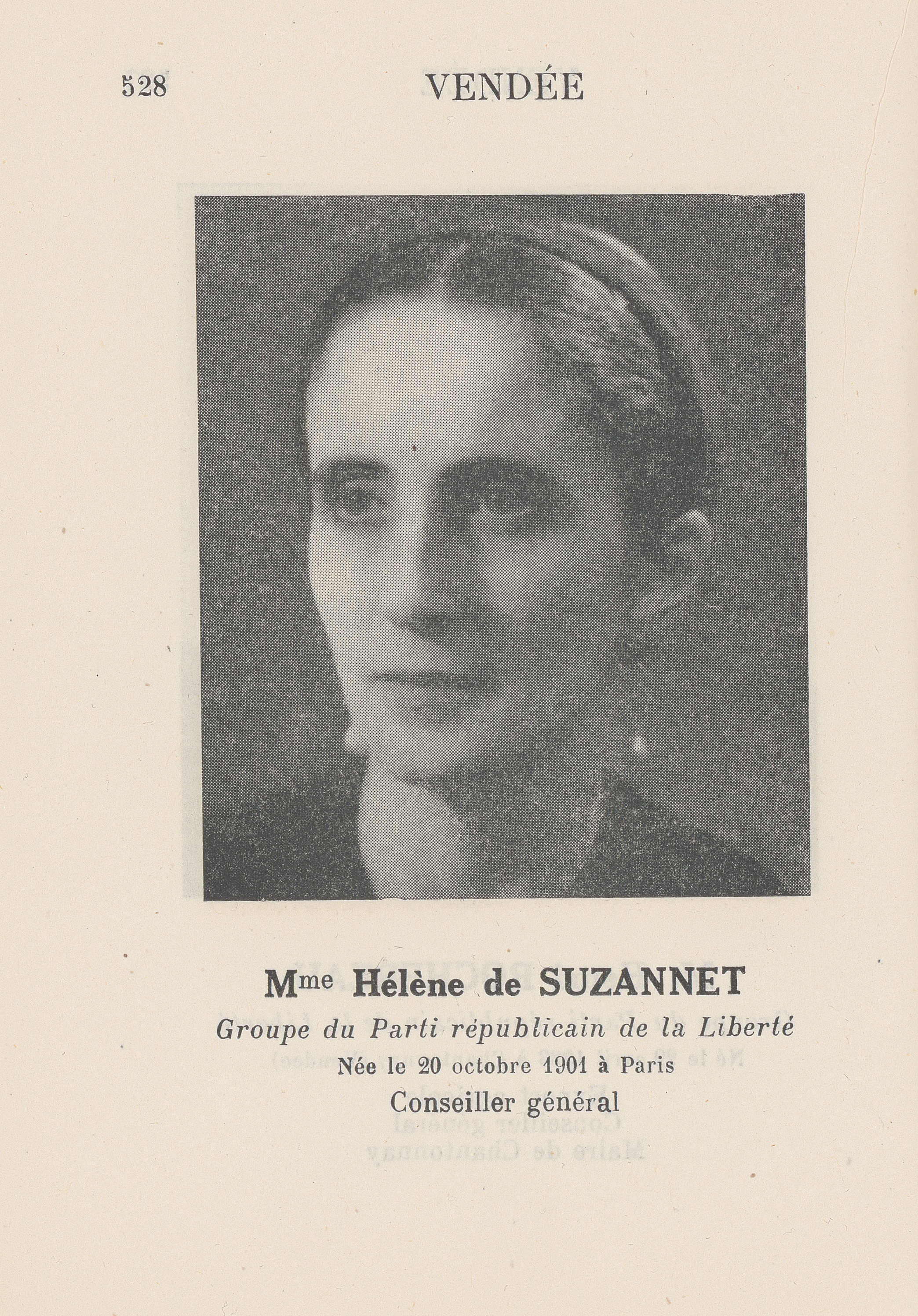

Member of the National Assembly
- In office 1945–1946
- Constituency: Vendée

Personal details
- Born: 20 October 1901 Paris, France
- Died: 21 December 1961 (aged 60) Paris, France

Hélène Anne Marie Charlotte de Suzannet (20 October 1901 – 21 December 1961) was a French politician. She was elected to the National Assembly in October 1945 as one of the first group of French women in parliament, and served in the National Assembly until June the following year.

== Biography ==
Hélène Durant de Mareuil was born in Paris in 1901, the daughter of Colonel Durant de Mareuil. At the age of 21 she married Count Jean de Suzannet and the couple went on to have five children. Jean was elected to parliament in 1936 as a member of the Republican Federation, but died in 1938 as a result of injuries sustained in a car accident.

During the Battle of France de Suzannet served as a Red Cross volunteer and nurse at La Roche-sur-Yon. Returning to Paris, she became a social worker, working with political and foreign detainees in Val-de-Grâce and Hôpital Saint-Louis. In 1943 she began participating in the French resistance and was arrested in June the same year. Detained in Fresnes Prison, she was charged with offences that could result in the death penalty. However, having been left without treatment for kidney problems for five months while in prison, her trial was adjourned when she was declared unfit for detention, instead being released under police surveillance. After the war she was awarded the Croix de Guerre, the Resistance Medal and the American Medal of Freedom.

Following the liberation de Suzannet became a member of the local Comité départemental de libération. She and several other women founded the 'Free French' party, of which de Suzannet became vice-president. She was a candidate in the 1945 municipal elections and was elected to Chavagnes-en-Paillers council and the cantonal council of Saint-Fulgent. She was subsequently a Republican Party of Liberty candidate in Vendée department in the October 1945 National Assembly elections, and was elected to parliament, becoming one of the first group of women in the National Assembly. She sat on the Committee on Family, Population and Public Health, and was made a juror of the High Court of Justice. She lost her seat in the June 1946 elections and did not run for election to parliament again. She died in Paris in 1961.
