= Republican Front (French Fourth Republic) =

The Republican Front (French: Front républicain) was a centre-left coalition that won the 1956 French legislative election. In the context of the Algerian War, behind Pierre Mendès-France, it gathered the French Section of the Workers' International (SFIO), the Radical Party, the Democratic and Socialist Union of the Resistance, and the National Centre of Social Republicans, which came from a split of the Gaullist movement.

The leader of the SFIO, Guy Mollet, became Prime Minister of France. His tenure was the longest of any prime minister during the unstable French Fourth Republic. His harsh policy in Algeria caused a division in the coalition and the resignation of Mendès-France and of some ministers.
