= Germaine Degrond =

French poet and politician

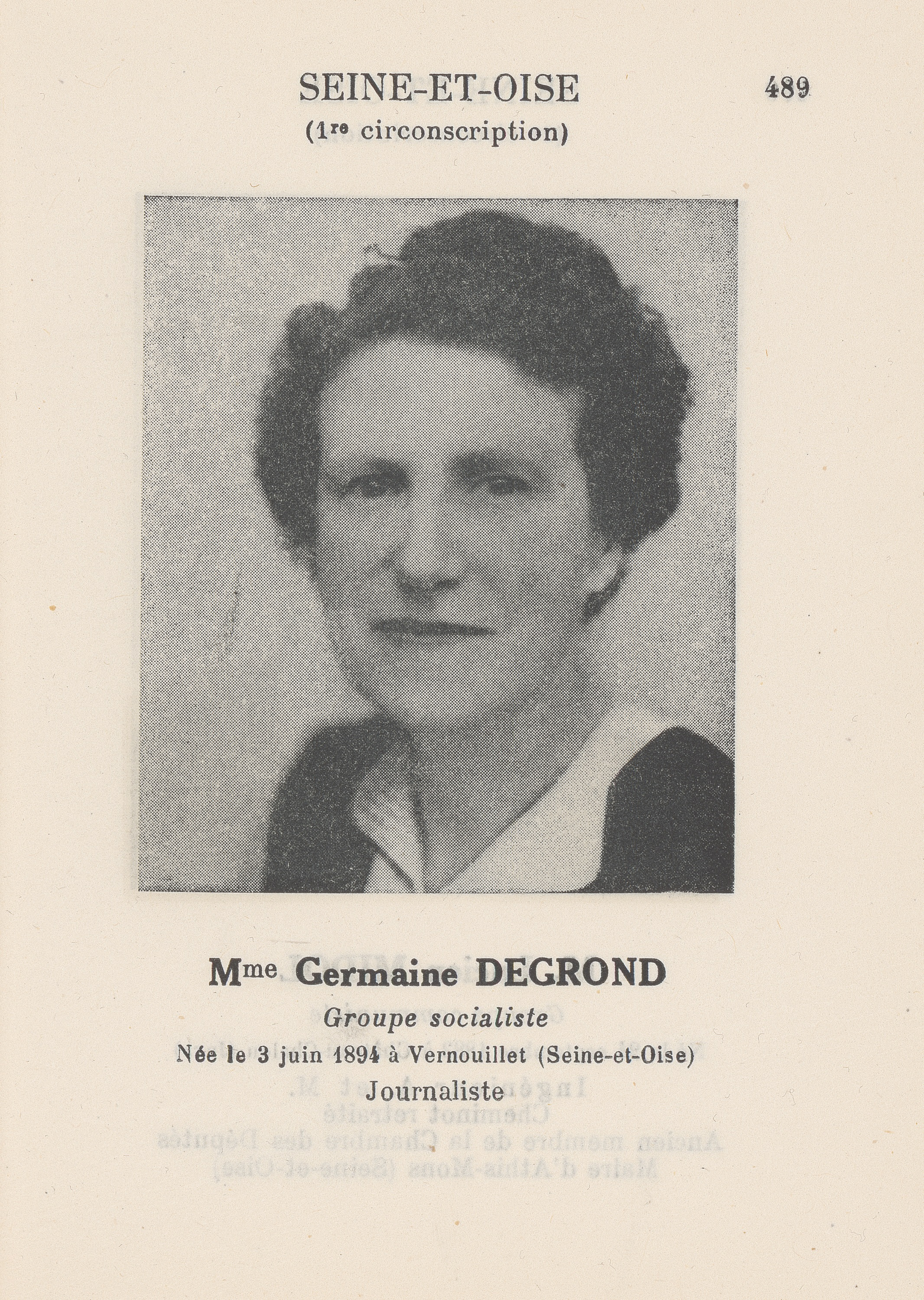
Germaine Degrond, 1946

Germaine Degrond (3 June 1894 – 18 April 1991) was a French poet and politician, and a member of the French Resistance during the Second World War.

== Biography ==
Céline Victorine Degrond was born at Vernouillet; her father was an engineer who worked for the railway company Chemins de fer de l'Ouest. He was a political activist and close to the Radical politician Henri Maurice Berteaux. Her mother, the former Victoire Michel, belonged to a family of Breton origin.

On 27 November 1915, she married Gustave Buray, and they had two children. They were divorced on 31 March 1933, and she continued to bring up the children on her own, while working as a secretary and shorthand-typist. She also wrote poetry, becoming a member of the Société des gens de lettres, and articles for socialist and feminist magazines such as La Voix des Femmes. She wrote a regular women's page for another such publication, Le Populaire.

A political activist from her early days, she was elected to the Comité National des Femmes Socialistes in 1931. She became a member of the administrative commission of the French Section of the Workers' International (SFIO) in 1937. She described herself as proud to represent women, mothers and housewives, because she was one of them. Her political activities continued while she organised local Resistance efforts in the Seine-et-Oise region.

After the war, Degrond was responsible for setting up a women's section of the CFIO. From October 1945 until November 1946 she was a member of the Provisional Government of the French Republic. From 1946 until 1955, and again from 1956 to 1958 she was a member of the Assemblée nationale, representing the Socialists.

== Awards ==
In 1982, she was awarded the Légion d'Honneur by then prime minister Michel Rocard, who praised her long history of dedication to the Socialist cause.
