= Cailhau =

Commune in Occitanie, France

- Commune
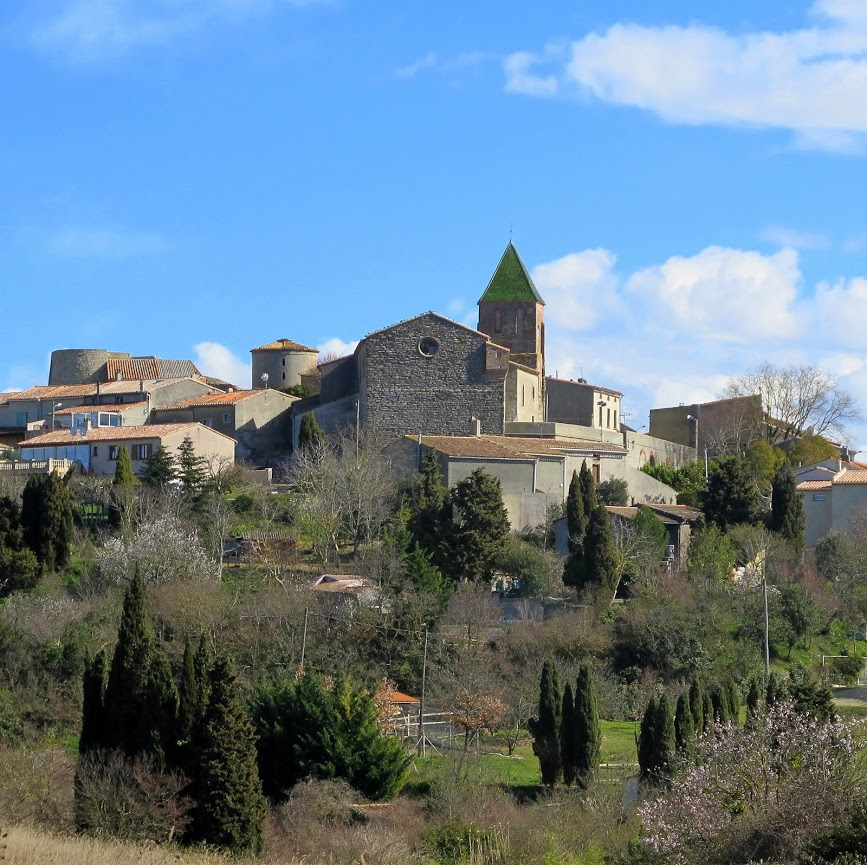
- The church and surroundings in Cailhau

- Coat of arms
- Location of Cailhau
- Location within France Location within Occitanie
- Coordinates: 43°08′52″N 2°08′14″E
- Country: France
- Region: Occitania
- Department: Aude
- Arrondissement: Limoux
- Canton: La Piège au Razès

Government
  - Mayor (2020–2026): Bernard Ragnère
- Area^{1}: 9.76 km^{2} (3.77 sq mi)
- Elevation: 221 m (725 ft)
- Highest elevation: 346 m (1,135 ft)
- Lowest elevation: 195 m (640 ft)
- Population (2023): 247
  - Density: 25.3/km^{2} (65.5/sq mi)
- Time zone: UTC+01:00 (CET)
  - Summer (DST): UTC+02:00 (CEST)
- INSEE/Postal code: 11058 /11240
- ^{1} French Land Register data, which excludes lakes, ponds, glaciers > 1 km^{2} (0.386 sq mi or 247 acres) and river estuaries.

Cailhau (French: [kajo]; Occitan: Calhau) is a commune in the Aude department in southern France.

== Geography ==
The commune is located between the Peugue and Devèze communes.

== History ==
The commune was historically used for protection and had a statue of the French king at the entrance to the commune.

== Population ==
Historical population
Year	Pop.	±% p.a.
1968	282	—
1975	261	−1.10%
1982	251	−0.56%
1990	219	−1.69%
1999	231	+0.59%
2007	248	+0.89%
2012	263	+1.18%
2017	266	+0.23%
2023	247	−1.23%
Source: INSEE

== See also ==
- Communes of the Aude department
- List of medieval bridges in France
