= Pierre-Henri Teitgen =

French lawyer

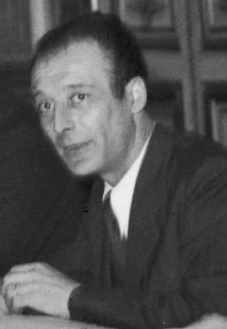

Minister of State
- In office 22 January 1947 – 22 October 1947
- President: Vincent Auriol
- Prime Minister: Paul Ramadier

Personal details
- Born: 29 May 1908 Rennes, France
- Died: 6 April 1997 (aged 88) Paris, France
- Party: Popular Republican Movement
- Education: University of Nancy
- Profession: Lawyer

Pierre-Henri Teitgen (29 May 1908 – 6 April 1997) was a French lawyer, professor and politician. Teitgen was born in Rennes, Brittany. Taken POW in 1940, he played a major role in the French Resistance. Teitgen's father, Henri Teitgen (1882–1965), was a senior politician of the Popular Republican Movement.

A member of French Parliament from 1945 to 1958 for Ille-et-Vilaine, Pierre-Henri was president of the Popular Republican Movement (Christian Democratic Party) from 1952 to 1956. He was Minister of Information in 1944 (one of the founders of the daily Le Monde), Minister of Justice in 1945–1946 (in charge of the purges from government of the Vichy regime's followers and of Nazi collaborators), Minister of Defence in 1947–48 in Robert Schuman's government at the time of the insurrectional strikes. In May 1948, he attended the Congress of The Hague and worked closely with Robert Schuman in Schuman Declaration and the start of the European Community when he was Minister of Information and Civil service in 1949–1950. He was later Minister of Overseas in 1950. He was member of the Constitutional Committee in 1958. He was twice Deputy Prime Minister in 1947–1948 and 1953–1954. He was member of the Consultative Constitutional Committee in 1958 but became a critic of de Gaulle's policies.

He supported the Socialist Defferre in his attempt as candidate for presidency in 1965. In September 1976, he was appointed member of the European Court of Human Rights. He had helped to create the court some 27 years earlier, in 1949, outlining its powers and the rights it should protect in a report for the Consultative Assembly of the Council of Europe. Teitgen died in Paris in 1997.

Political offices
Preceded by François de Menthon	Minister of Justice; 1945–1946	Succeeded by Paul Ramadier
