= High Court (France) =

In France, the Parliament sitting in High Court (Haute Cour) is the jurisdiction responsible for pronouncing the impeachment of the President of the Republic "if he should fail to carry out his duties in a way manifestly incompatible with the exercise of his mandate". The jurisdiction's functioning is governed by Article 68 of the Constitution, whose current form is its 2008 edit.
