= 1956 French legislative election =

- 2 January 1956

544 seats in the National Assembly
- Turnout: 81.98% (▲1.79pp)
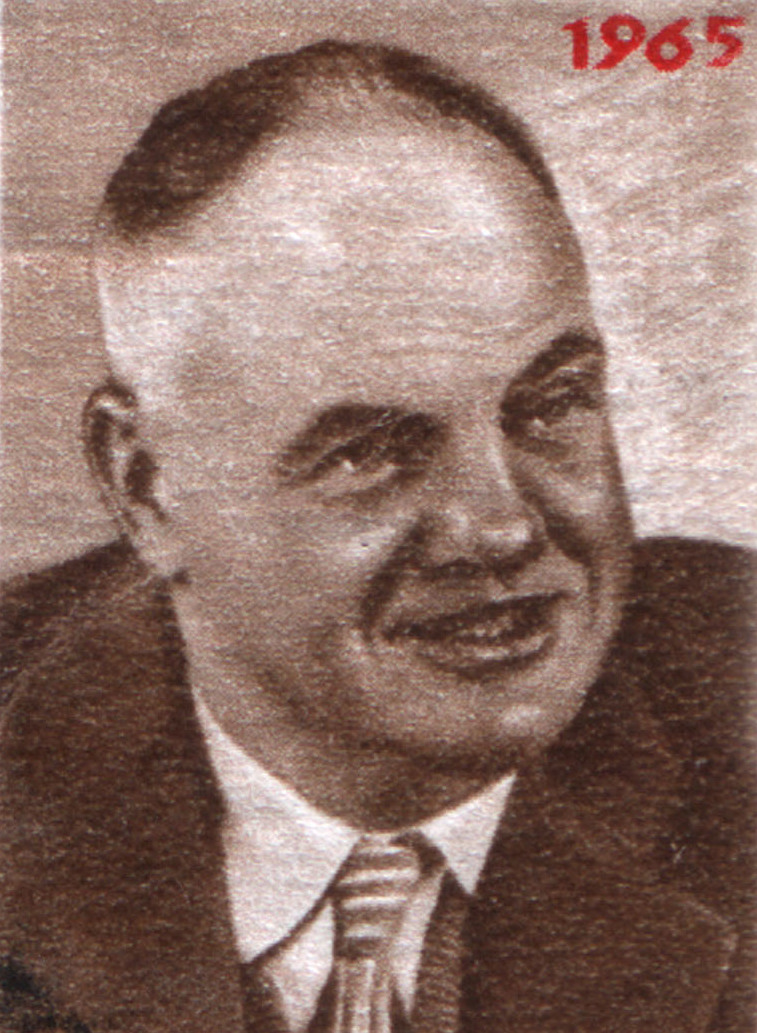

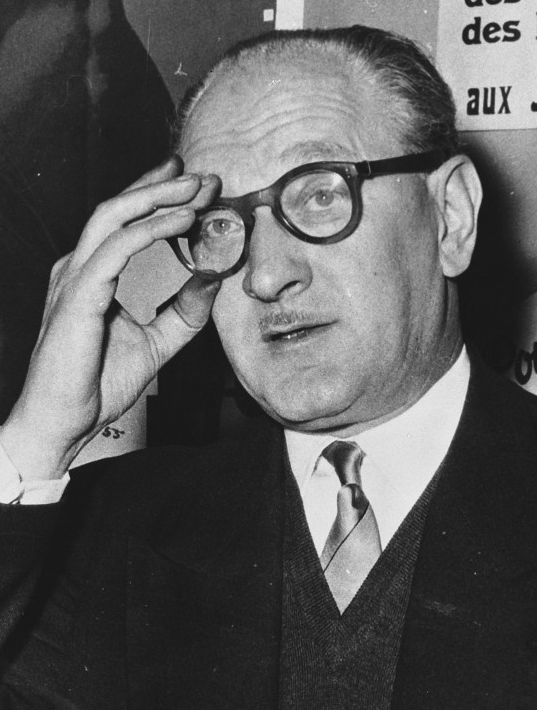

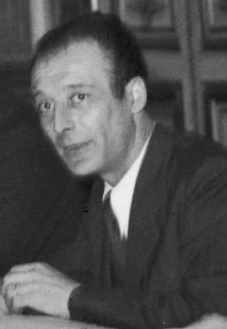

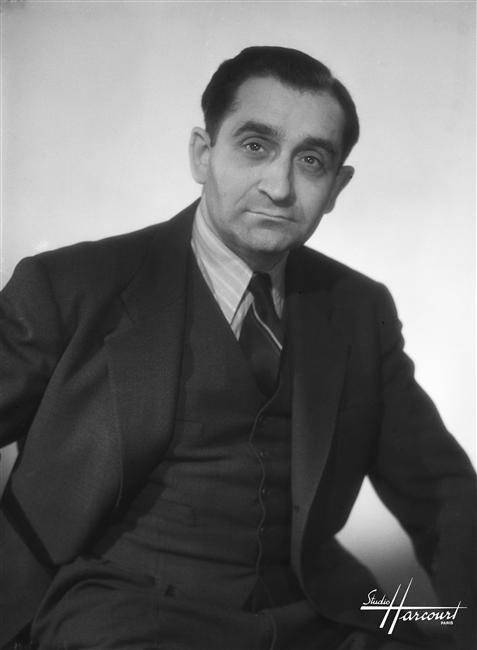
	First party	Second party	Third party
		CNI
Leader	Maurice Thorez	none	Guy Mollet
Party	PCF	CNIP	SFIO
Last election	97 seats	87 seats	94 seats
Seats won	147	95	88
Seat change	▲50	▲8	▼6
Popular vote	5,514,403	3,259,782	3,247,431
Percentage	25.89%	15.30%	15.25%
	Fourth party	Fifth party	Sixth party
Leader	Pierre-Henri Teitgen	Pierre Mendès France (Radical); René Pleven (UDSR)	Pierre Poujade
Party	MRP	Radical–UDSR	UFF
Last election	82 seats	–	–
Seats won	71	73	51
Seat change	▼11	New	New
Popular vote	2,366,321	2,389,163	2,483,813
Percentage	11.11%	11.22%	11.66%
- Results by department
Prime Minister before election
Edgar Faure
PRV
Elected Prime Minister
Guy Mollet
SFIO

Legislative elections were held in France on 2 January 1956 to elect the third National Assembly of the Fourth Republic. The elections were held using party-list proportional representation. The elections had been scheduled for June 1956; however, they were brought forward by Edgar Faure using a constitutional sanction.

The previous legislative elections in 1951 had been won by the Third Force, a coalition of center-left and center-right parties, but it was divided about denominational schools question and, when faced with the colonial problem, the governments had gradually moved towards the right. A part of the Rally of the French People (RPF), the Gaullist party, joined the majority in opposing the leadership of Charles de Gaulle, who then retired.

The defeat in the Battle of Dien Bien Phu in May 1954 caused a political crisis. The Radical Pierre Mendès-France became leader of the cabinet and ended the First Indochina War. He also began the process of independence for Morocco and Tunisia, but from November 1954 on, France was confronted by the Algerian War. In February 1955, Mendès-France was replaced, at the head of the cabinet, by his rival in the Radical Party, Edgar Faure. This one led a more repressive policy in Algeria.

The far-right, led by Pierre Poujade, re-appeared at about the same time. He was a critic of "fiscalism", and leader of a shopkeepers and craftsmen's movement. Many voters seemed tired of the political system's numerous ministerial crises, and he had much support in the rural areas, which were in decline.

The anticipated legislative elections took place when Faure was defeated by the National Assembly. Even though the French Communist Party re-emerged as the country's most popular party, it did not join the government. A coalition was formed behind Mendès-France and advocated a peaceful resolution of the Algerian conflict. This Republican Front was composed of the French Section of the Workers' International (SFIO, socialist party) of Guy Mollet, the Radical Party of Pierre Mendès-France, the Democratic and Socialist Union of the Resistance of François Mitterrand and the National Centre of Social Republicans of Jacques Chaban-Delmas. Faure was excluded from the Radical Party – in response he transformed the Rally of the Republican Lefts (which had been abandoned by those groups which had now joined the Republican Front) into a party that he led, and he campaigned with the center-right parties. The French Communist Party remained the largest party and the Republican Front obtained a relative majority in order to end the Algerian War.

The Poujadists won 51 seats versus predictions of six to eight, including a young Jean-Marie Le Pen, and the press stated that they held the balance of power. Media reception was mixed, with the result welcomed by communist supporters and condemned by papers such as The Times, Le Figaro, and The Saturday Evening Post.

The coalition cabinet was led by the Socialist leader Guy Mollet. At the beginning he was also supported by the Communists, but pressure from the pieds-noir in Algeria incited him into leading a very repressive policy against the Algerian nationalists. This policy was criticized by Vice-Prime Minister Mendès-France and other members of the cabinet, who resigned, splitting the Republican Front. Mollet and his successors floundered in the conflict until May 1958.

== Results ==
Graph of the party split among 544 seats.
Party	Votes	%	Seats
French Communist Party	5,514,403	25.89	147
Moderates	3,259,782	15.30	95
French Section of the Workers' International	3,247,431	15.25	88
Union for the Defense of Tradesmen and Artisans	2,483,813	11.66	51
Republican Front (Radical Party–UDSR)	2,389,163	11.22	73
Radical Party–RGR–UDSR (non-Front)	838,231	3.94	73
Popular Republican Movement	2,366,321	11.11	71
National Centre of Social Republicans (non-Front)	585,764	2.75	16
National Centre of Social Republicans	256,587	1.20	16
Far-right	260,749	1.22	0
Miscellaneous	98,600	0.46	3
Total	21,300,844	100.00	544
Valid votes	21,300,844	97.05	
Invalid/blank votes	647,160	2.95	
Total votes	21,948,004	100.00	
Registered voters/turnout	26,772,255	81.98	
Source: Mackie & Rose, Becker
