= Popular Republican Movement =

Defunct political party in France

Popular Republican Movement Mouvement Républicain Populaire
- President: Maurice Schumann (first); Jean Lecanuet (last)
- Founder: Georges Bidault
- Founded: November 25, 1944
- Dissolved: September 13, 1967
- Merger of: Popular Democratic Party; Lorrain Republican Union; Popular Republican Union
- Merged into: Democratic Centre
- Ideology: Christian democracy Pro-Europeanism
- Political position: Centre to centre-right
- Religion: Catholic Church
- National affiliation: Tripartisme (1944–47); Third Force (1947–58)
- European Parliament group: Christian Democratic Group
- International affiliation: Christian Democrat International
- Colours: White

The Popular Republican Movement (French: Mouvement Républicain Populaire, MRP) was a Christian-democratic political party in France during the Fourth Republic. Its base was the Catholic vote and its leaders included Georges Bidault, Robert Schuman, Paul Coste-Floret, Pierre-Henri Teitgen and Pierre Pflimlin. It played a major role in forming governing coalitions, in emphasizing compromise and the middle ground, and in protecting against a return to extremism and political violence. It played an even more central role in foreign policy, having charge of the Foreign Office for ten years and launching plans for the creation of the European Coal and Steel Community, which grew into the European Union. Its voter base gradually dwindled in the 1950s and it had little power by 1954.

== History ==
=== Origins of French Christian Democracy ===
In the late 19th century secular forces sought to radically reduce the power of the Catholic Church in France, especially regarding schools. The Catholic bishops mistrusted the Republic and the ideas of the French Revolution, as well as the idea of popular sovereignty, which questioned the superiority of the spiritual power over the temporal. For this reason, it supported all the conservative governments of the 19th century, notably MacMahon and his policy of "moral order".

In 1892, in his encyclical Au Milieu Des Sollicitudes, Pope Leo XIII advised the French Catholics to rally to the Republic. The previous year, another encyclical, Rerum novarum had denounced both capitalistic society and socialist ideology, and advocated the creation of Catholic popular organisations. In 1894, students founded Le Sillon (The Furrow). Its leader, Marc Sangnier, campaigned for spiritual values, democracy and social reforms. It represented the progressive wing of French Catholicism. Radical forces triumphed in 1905 and disestablished the Catholic Church and seized its properties. The very conservative Pope Pius X told the bishops to distance themselves from the state and condemned Le Sillon in his 1910 encyclical Notre charge apostolique. Better relations were restored in the 1920s, but the parties on the left (Radical, Socialist and Communist) were strongly anticlerical.

At the beginning of the 20th century, many organisations appeared: the Christian Workers Youth, the Christian Agricultural Youth, and the French Confederation of Christian Workers. In 1924, the Popular Democratic Party (PDP) was founded, but it remained a small centre-right party. However, more liberal Christian Democratic ideas arose in intellectual circles. Emmanuel Mounier founded the review Esprit (mind or spirit) which denounced fascism and the passivity of the Western democracies. In the paper L'Aube (The Dawn), Francisque Gay and Georges Bidault shared similar theses. These circles participated actively in the anti-Nazi underground Resistance during the Second World War.

=== Foundation and height of the MRP ===
In 1944, some prominent French politicians wanted to rally all the non-Communist Resistance behind Charles De Gaulle. This project failed. The French Section of the Workers' International (SFIO) was refounded and people from the Christian resistance movement founded the Popular Republican Movement. It claimed its loyalty to de Gaulle, who led the provisional government composed of Communists, Socialists and Christian democrats. At the November 1945 legislative election, the MRP was second (23.9%) after the French Communist Party (PCF) but ahead the SFIO.

The MRP benefited from the absence of real right-wing challengers to rally the conservative electorate. Indeed, among the three largest parties, it was the only one that was not Marxist. Furthermore, it appeared the closest to de Gaulle. It supported the reforms decided by the provisional government and inspired by the programme of the National Council of Resistance written during the war: nationalisation of banks and industrial companies such as Renault, and the creation of a welfare state. Georges Bidault remarked that the MRP was governing "in the centre with right-wing methods to attain left-wing ends" or that it was "pursuing left-wing policies with a right-wing electorate" (une politique de gauche, avec un électorat de droite).

Nevertheless, the MRP disagreed with the institutional and constitutional ideas of De Gaulle, who advocated a strong executive power, not dependent on Parliament, acting in the national interest while particular interests would be represented by the parties in Parliament. Wanting to achieve the complete integration of Catholicism in the Republic, the MRP supported the principle of parliamentary democracy against De Gaulle.

Relations with De Gaulle deteriorated. In January 1946, the president of the provisional government resigned in protest at the restoration of the "parties regime". The MRP ministers chose to stay in government. Nevertheless, the party called on voters to reject the proposed constitution in May 1946, fearing the election of a pro-Communist regime. After that, the MRP became the largest party in parliament after the June 1946 legislative election (28.2%) and Bidault took charge of the cabinet. In October 1946, the MRP, together with the SFIO and the PCF, presented a new proposed constitution. It was approved despite De Gaulle's call for a "no" vote. One year later, a Gaullist party was founded under the name of Rally of the French People (Rassemblement du peuple français or RPF).

The MRP became a mainstay of the Fourth Republic. It was allied with the Socialists and the Communists in the Three-parties alliance until spring 1947. Then, it joined the Third Force that brought together centre-left and centre-right parties against the Communists on the one hand and the Gaullists on the other hand. Two Christian Democrats led the cabinet: Georges Bidault (June–December 1946, October 1949-July 1950) and Robert Schuman (November 1947-July 1948, August–September 1948) who presented, as Foreign Minister, plans for what would become the European Community. Indeed, European unification was an important part of the MRP platform.

It is the only major French party to defend the functioning of the colonial system, including forced labour, in the post-war period.

=== A gradual decline ===
With the creation of the Gaullist RPF and the reconstruction of the conservative right in the National Center of Independents and Peasants (Centre national des indépendants et paysans, CNIP), the MRP faced challengers to represent the right-wing electorate. At the 1951 legislative election, it lost half of its 1946 voters (12.6%). Furthermore, due to its propensity for integrating conservative politicians sometimes compromised by their association with Vichy, it was sardonically nicknamed the "Machine à Ramasser les Pétainistes" ("Machine for collecting Pétainists").

The MRP also dominated French foreign and colonial policies during most of the later 1940s and 1950s. Along with the French Socialist Party, it was the most energetic supporter in the country of European integration. It was also a strong backer of NATO and of close alliance with the United States, making it the most "Atlanticist" of French political parties.

Its leaders, especially Georges Bidault and Paul Coste-Floret (foreign and colonial ministers respectively in several French coalition governments) were primary architects of France's hard-line colonial policies that culminated in long insurgencies in Vietnam (1946-1954) and Algeria (1954-1962), as well as a series of smaller insurrections and political crises elsewhere in the French Empire. The MRP eventually divided over the Algerian question in the late 1950s (with Bidault being an avid supporter of the OAS).

In terms of voters, many on its left-wing joined the Socialists and many on its right wing left for the Moderates or Gaullists.

After the 13 May 1958 crisis, the party supported De Gaulle's return and called for approval of the constitution of the Fifth Republic. It participated in the government of national unity behind De Gaulle, then broke with him in 1962 over his opposition to extending European economic integration into the realm of political integration.

=== Faced with the Gaullist hegemony ===
When De Gaulle proposed a referendum on presidential election by universal suffrage, the MRP took part in the "coalition of the no". De Gaulle dissolved the National Assembly and the MRP suffered a serious electoral defeat.

In 1963, Jean Lecanuet took the leadership in order to renew the party's image. He was a candidate at the 1965 presidential election and was third (15%) behind De Gaulle and Socialist François Mitterrand. Then he created the Democratic Centre by merging MRP members with the National Center of Independents and Peasants (CNIP). The MRP itself disbanded in 1967, while some historical personalities of the party (such as Maurice Schumann) joined the Gaullist party Union of Democrats for the Fifth Republic.

== Presidents ==
- 1944–1949: Maurice Schumann
- 1949–1952: Georges Bidault
- 1952–1956: Pierre-Henri Teitgen
- 1956–1959: Pierre Pflimlin
- 1959–1963: André Colin
- 1963–1965: Jean Lecanuet

== Members ==
- Abbé Pierre (1912–2007), MRP deputy from 1946 to 1951
- Robert Lecourt (1908–2004), MRP deputy from 1946 to 1958, later Judge and President of the European Court of Justice.

=== French Parliament ===
National Assembly
Election year	# of overall votes	% of overall vote	# of overall seats won	+/–	Leader
1945	4,780,338 (#2)	24.9	141 / 522	–	Maurice Schumann
1946 (Jun)	5,589,213 (#1)	28.22	166 / 586	▲25	Georges Bidault
1946 (Nov)	4,988,609 (#2)	25.96	173 / 627	▲7	Georges Bidault
1951	2,369,778 (#5)	12.60	95 / 625	▼78	Georges Bidault
1956	2,366,321 (#6)	10.88	83 / 595	▼12	Pierre-Henri Teitgen
1958	1,365,064 (#6)	7.5	57 / 466	▼26	Pierre Pflimlin
1962	821,635 (#6)	5.45	36 / 465	▼21	André Colin

== See also ==
- Ligue de la jeune République founded in 1912 by Marc Sangnier
