= 1958 French legislative election =

- 23 and 30 November 1958

All 576 seats to the French National Assembly 289 seats were needed for a majority
- Turnout: 77.1% (▼5.7 pp) (1st round)
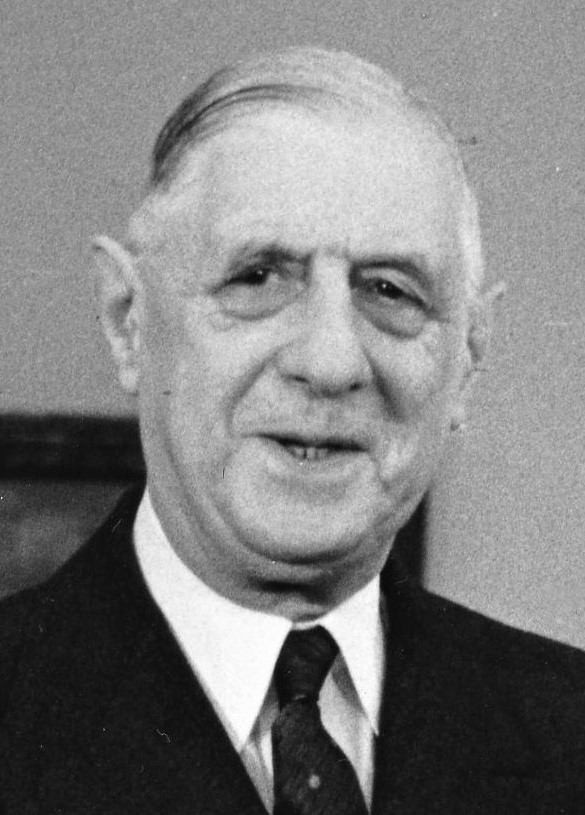

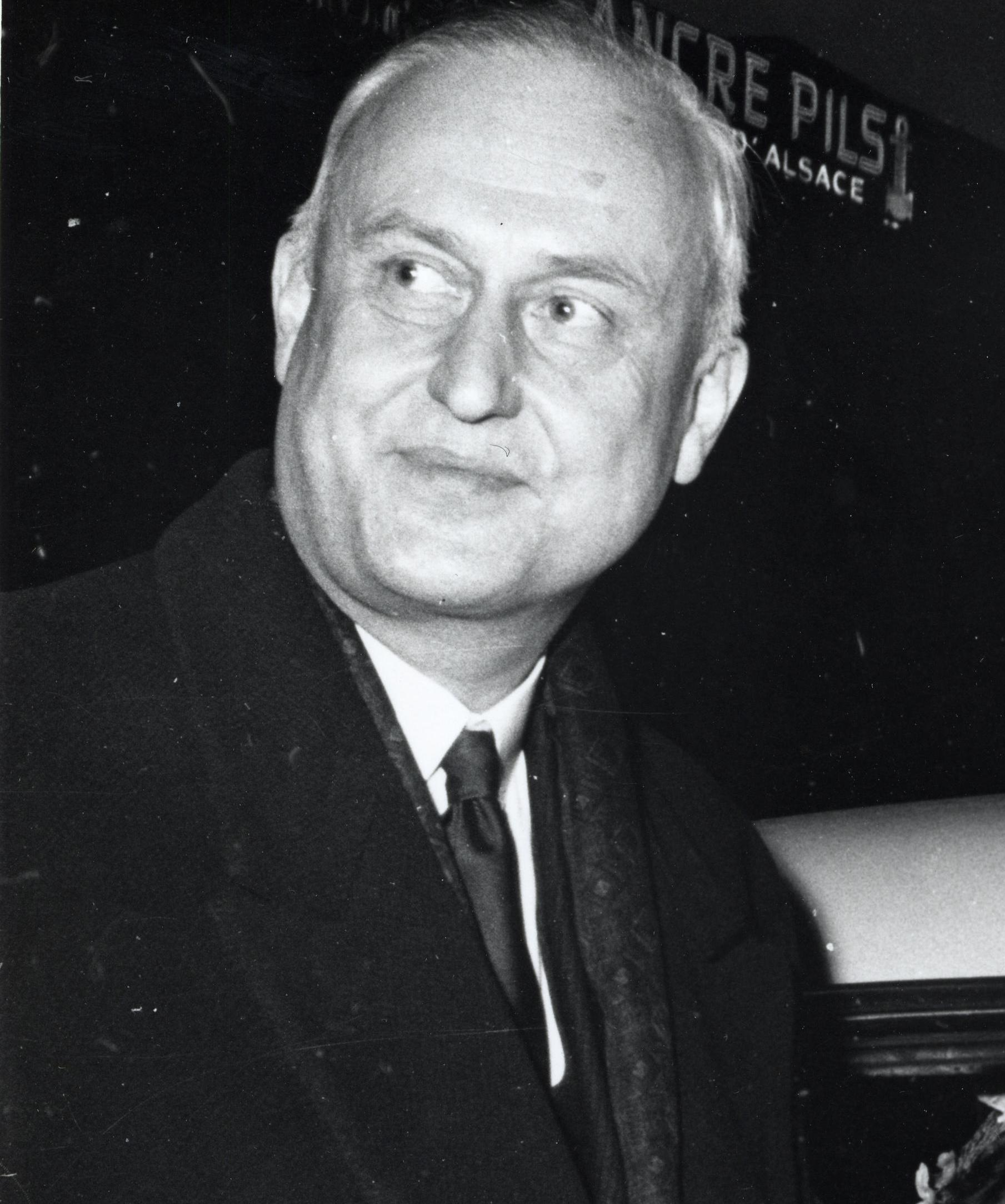

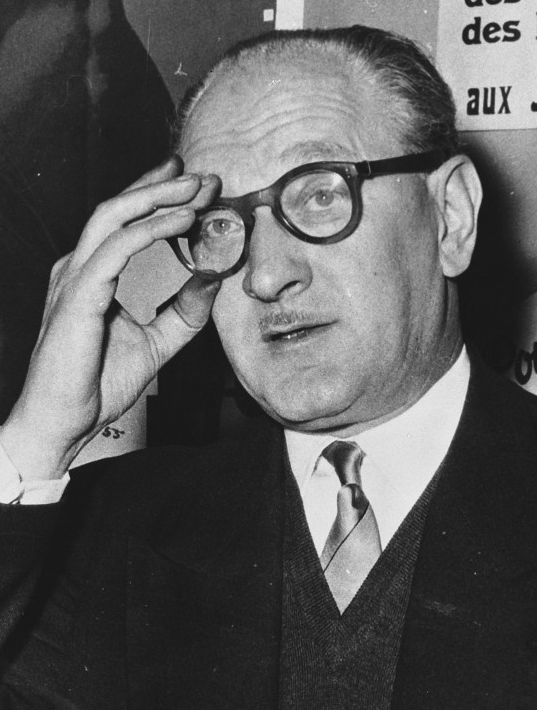

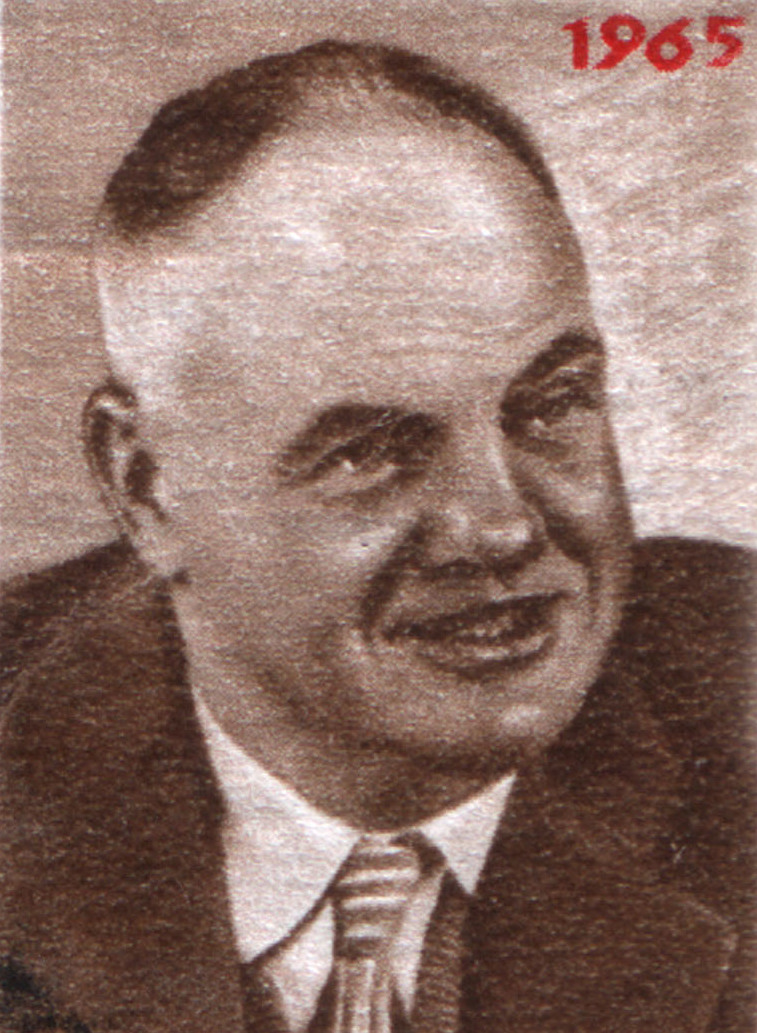
| | Majority party | Minority party | Third party |
|---|---|---|---|
| | | CNIP |
| Leader | Charles de Gaulle | none | Pierre Pflimlin |
| Party | UNR | CNIP | MRP |
| Leader's seat | | | Bas-Rhin-8th |
| Last election | 22 seats | 95 seats | 71 seats |
| Seats won | 189 | 132 | 57 |
| Seat change | ▲167 | ▲37 | ▼14 |
| Popular vote | 3,603,958 (1st round); 4,769,052 (2nd round) | 4,092,600 (1st round); 4,250,083 (2nd round) | 2,387,788 (1st round); 1,365,064 (2nd round) |
| Percentage | 17.6% (1st round); 26.4% (2nd round) | 19.9% (1st round); 23.6% (2nd round) | 11.6% (1st round); 7.5% (2nd round) |
| | Fourth party | Fifth party | Sixth party |
| Leader | Guy Mollet | Félix Gaillard | Maurice Thorez |
| Party | SFIO | PRV | PCF |
| Leader's seat | Pas-de-Calais-1st | Charente-2nd | Seine-50th |
| Last election | 95 seats | 77 seats | 150 seats |
| Seats won | 40 | 37 | 10 |
| Seat change | ▼55 | ▼40 | ▼140 |
| Popular vote | 3,167,354 (1st round); 2,484,417 (2nd round) | 2,695,287 (1st round); 1,398,409 (2nd round) | 3,882,204 (1st round); 3,741,384 (2nd round) |
| Percentage | 15.5% (1st round); 13.8% (2nd round) | 12.9% (1st round); 7.7% (2nd round) | 18.9% (1st round); 20.7% (2nd round) |
Prime Minister before election
Charles de Gaulle
UNR
Elected Prime Minister
Michel Debré
UNR

Legislative elections were held in France on 23 and 30 November 1958 to elect the first National Assembly of the French Fifth Republic.

Since 1954, the French Fourth Republic had been mired in the Algerian War. In May 1958, Pierre Pflimlin, a Christian-Democrat, became prime minister. He was known to be in favour of a negotiated settlement with the Algerian nationalists.

On 13 May, riots broke out in Algiers, with the complicity of the army in what is known as the May 1958 crisis in France. A rebel government seized power in Algiers in order to defend "French Algeria". The next day, General Massu demanded the return to power of General Charles de Gaulle.

The rebellious generals took control of Corsica threatening to conduct an assault on Paris, involving paratroopers and armoured forces based at Rambouillet. In Paris, the political leaders were trying to find a compromise. On 1 June, returning from his 12 years out of power since his abrupt resignation as Head of the Provisional Government of the French Republic in 1946, De Gaulle replaced Pflimlin to lead a government of national unity and nominated as Ministers of State (Vice-Prime Ministers) Pierre Pflimlin (Popular Republican Movement, MRP), Guy Mollet (French Section of the Workers' International (SFIO), Louis Jacquinot (National Center of Independents and Peasants, CNIP) and Félix Houphouët-Boigny. He obtained the right to develop a new Constitution. Only the Communists and some center-left politicians such as Pierre Mendès-France and François Mitterrand, opposed this "coup against the Republic". This opposition came to a head the day De Gaulle took office with a 200,000 strong demonstration taking place in Paris to oppose the unprecedented power given to De Gaulle. However, these oppositions were then met with counter demonstrations with a series of car honking stand off from Parisians occurring at the Avenue des Champs Elysées that very same night. Further demonstrations between both partisans occurred in other cities including Toulouse and Bordeaux.

On 28 September the new constitution was approved in a referendum in the French Union by 83% of all voters, and in metropolitan France by 79% of voters. The Fifth Republic was born. The two-round system was re-established for the legislative elections. The Gaullists created the Union for the New Republic which became the largest parliamentary group. Their opponents received vastly less seats with in particular the PCF losing 137 seats compared to 1956. The small number of left-wing deputies elected may be explained by divisions among left-leaning parties between supporters and opponents to the Fifth Republic: the two-round ballot tends to reward parties which are able to form alliances with each other. As such, De Gaulle's new party formed a coalition with the CNIP to form a new government.

On 21 December de Gaulle was elected President of France by an electoral college. His Justice Minister Michel Debré became prime minister. The pro-Fifth Republic center-left parties (SFIO and Radical Party) left the presidential majority. This established the first Gaullist centre-right government.

== Results (Metropolitan France) ==
| Party | First round | | Second round | | Total seats |
| Party | Votes | % | Votes | % | Total seats |
|---|---|---|---|---|---|
| National Centre of Independents and Peasants and Moderates | 4,092,600 | 19.97 | 4,250,083 | 23.60 | 132 |
| French Communist Party | 3,882,204 | 18.94 | 3,741,384 | 20.78 | 10 |
| Union for the New Republic and Gaullists | 3,603,958 | 17.58 | 4,769,052 | 26.48 | 189 |
| French Section of the Workers' International | 3,167,354 | 15.45 | 2,484,417 | 13.80 | 40 |
| Radical Party, Dissidents and Republican Centre | 2,695,287 | 13.15 | 1,398,409 | 7.77 | 37 |
| Popular Republican Movement and Christian Democrats | 2,387,788 | 11.65 | 1,365,064 | 7.58 | 57 |
| Far-right | 669,518 | 3.27 | | | 1 |
| Total | 20,498,709 | 100.00 | 18,008,409 | 100.00 | 466 |
Source: Macridis & Brown
