= 1945 French legislative election =

← 1936	21 October 1945	June 1946 →

All 522 seats in the National Assembly 262 seats needed for a majority
- Registered: 24,622,862
- Turnout: 81.85% (▼1.65pp)
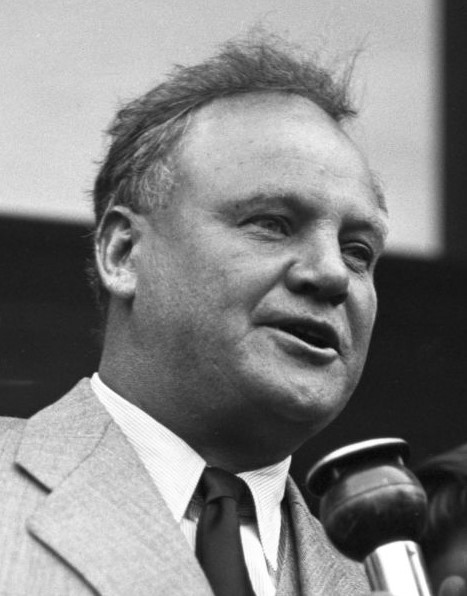

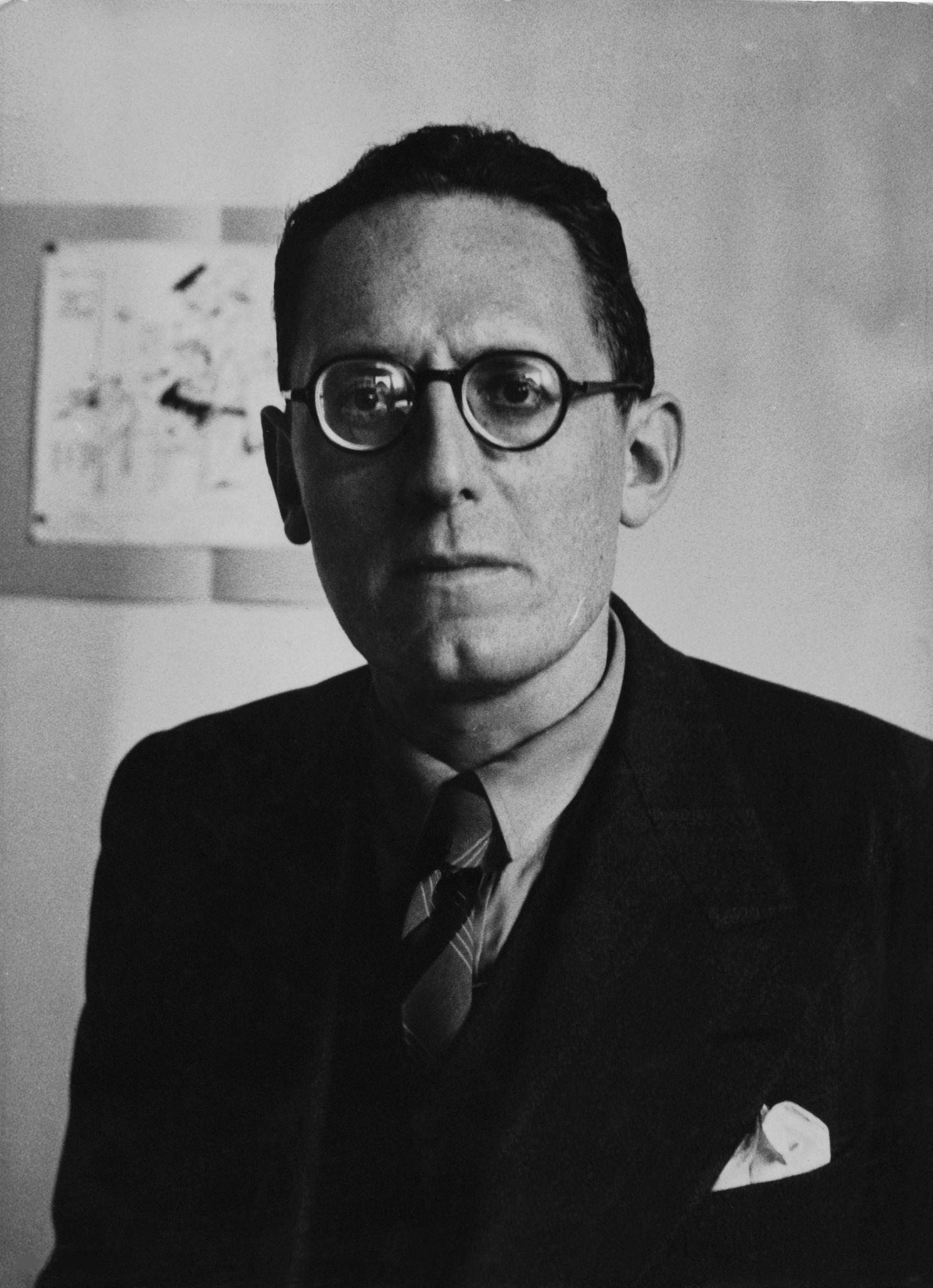

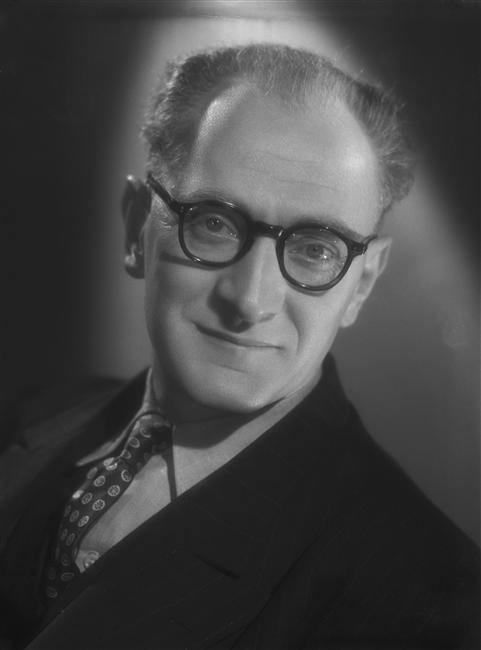
	Majority party	Minority party	Third party
Leader	Maurice Thorez	Maurice Schumann	Guy Mollet
Party	PCF	MRP	SFIO
Seats won	148	141	134
Popular vote	5,005,336	4,780,338	4,561,411
Percentage	26.08%	24.91%	23.77%
- Results by department
Prime Minister before election
Charles de Gaulle
Independent
Elected Prime Minister
Charles de Gaulle
Independent

French newsreel before the elections

Legislative elections were held in France on 21 October 1945 to elect a Constituent Assembly to draft a constitution for a Fourth French Republic. A total of 522 seats were elected through proportional representation; women were allowed to vote for the first time.

== Parties and issues ==
On 21 October 1945 the French voters were called to make two choices: the election of their deputies and a referendum in order to authorize the elected National Assembly to prepare a new constitutional text. De Gaulle and the "Three parties alliance" called for a "Yes" vote, whereas the Radicals and the Conservatives campaigned for a "No".

Symbol of the French Resistance to the German occupation and founder of the Free French Forces General Charles de Gaulle led a provisional government composed of the three main political forces of the Resistance: the French Communist Party (PCF), the French Section of the Workers' International (SFIO) and the Christian democratic Popular Republican Movement (MRP). It advocated an economic policy inspired by the programme of the National Council of Resistance: the creation of a welfare state, and the nationalization of banks and major industrial companies (such as Renault). The opposition was composed of the parties which had dominated the pre-war governments of the Third Republic: the Radical Party and the classical Right.

== Results ==
Unsurprisingly, the "Three-parties alliance" won a large majority in the National Assembly. The Radical Party, which had been the leading party of the left in the Third Republic, suffered a catastrophic result, and the right was equally destroyed (because of its support of Marshal Philippe Pétain). They appeared as being the forces of the past, as symbols of capitulation to Nazi Germany and the regime which collapsed in 1940. The French Communist Party, which had already doubled its score in the previous 1936 elections, came out on top with around 26% of the vote and 159 seats. While the PCF and SFIO favored a unicameral parliamentary system, the MRP favored a bicameral legislature. De Gaulle advocated a presidential government. He resigned in January 1946. The PCF and SFIO proposals were rejected in the 5 May 1946 referendum. This assembly was dissolved.

Party	Votes	%	Seats
French Communist Party	5,005,336	26.08	148
Popular Republican Movement	4,780,338	24.91	141
French Section of the Workers' International	4,561,411	23.77	134
Conservatives (AD–DM–ER–PP–PRL)	2,545,845	13.27	62
Radicals (RS–RG–IG–PRRS–RGR)	2,131,763	11.11	35
Others	165,106	0.86	2
Total	19,189,799	100.00	522
Valid votes	19,189,799	97.62	
Invalid/blank votes	467,804	2.38	
Total votes	19,657,603	100.00	
Registered voters/turnout	24,622,862	79.83	
Source: Nohlen & Stöver
