= June 1946 French legislative election =

← 1945	2 June 1946	November 1946 →

All 586 seats in the French National Assembly 294 seats needed for a majority
- Turnout: 81.85% (▲2.02pp)
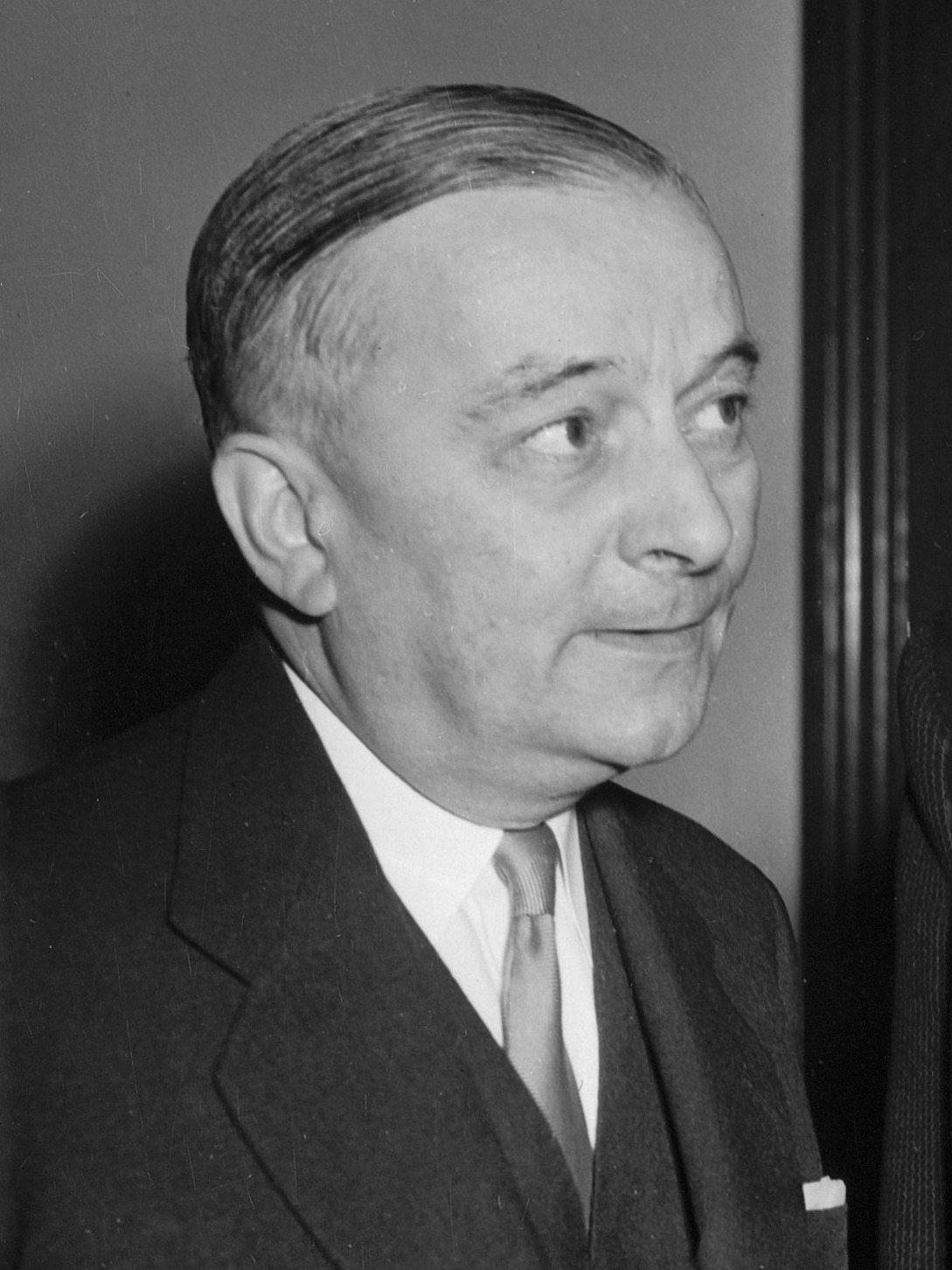

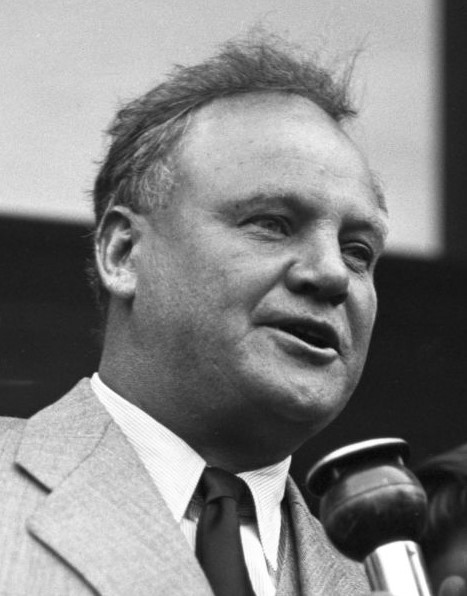

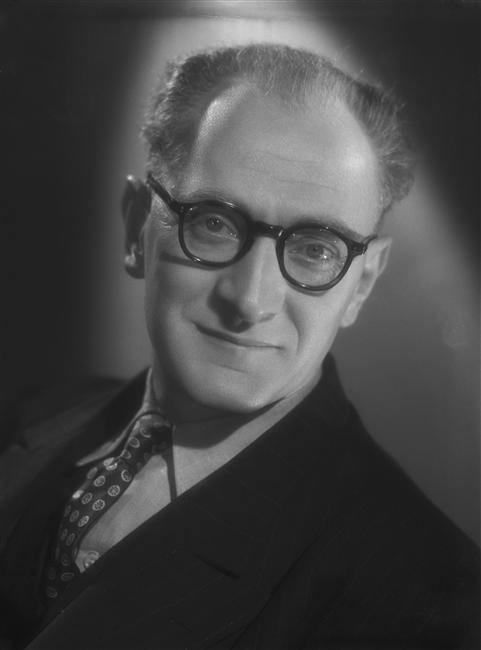

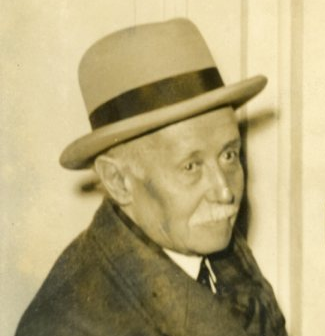
	Majority party	Minority party	Third party
Leader	Georges Bidault	Maurice Thorez	Guy Mollet
Party	MRP	PCF	SFIO
Seats won	160	146	115
Popular vote	5,589,059	5,199,111	4,187,818
Percentage	28.11%	26.15%	21.06%
	Fourth party	Fifth party
		PRRRS
Leader	Michel Clemenceau	Jean-Paul David
Party	PRL	PRRRS
Seats won	62	39
Popular vote	2,539,845	2,295,119
Percentage	12.78	11.54%
- Results by department
Prime Minister before election
Félix Gouin
SFIO
Elected Prime Minister
Georges Bidault
MRP

Legislative elections were held in France on 2 June 1946 to elect the second post-war Constituent Assembly designated to prepare a new constitution. The ballot system used was proportional representation.

After the liberation of France in the Second World War, three parties dominated the political scene due to their participation in the Resistance to the German occupation: the French Communist Party (PCF), the French Section of the Workers' International (SFIO, socialist party) and the Popular Republican Movement (MRP) Christian democratic party. They formed a provisional government led by General Charles de Gaulle.

General de Gaulle advocated a strong presidential government. He felt that the "regime of the parties" under the French Third Republic's system of parliamentary government (characterised by its political instability and ever-changing coalitions) was a cause of the 1940 collapse. However, the three main parties considered parliamentary democracy to be inseparable from the ideology of French republicanism. To them, de Gaulle's project appeared to be a rebirth of Bonapartism. In January 1946 de Gaulle resigned from the cabinet.

The socialist Félix Gouin succeeded him. A first constitutional draft was approved by the National Assembly. It was supported by the Communists and the Socialists. It concentrated power in a unicameral Assembly and abolished the Senate of France. The Christian-Democrats campaigned for the "No" with de Gaulle and the opponents to a constitutional change (the classical Right and the Rally of the Republican Lefts dominated by the Radical Party).

The "No" coalition warned the voters against the danger of a "dictatorship" of an Assembly dominated by the Marxists, which could question the existence of private property. In the "Yes" coalition, the SFIO refused the communist proposition of a common campaign. Finally, the "No"s won by 53% of the votes in a May 1946 referendum.

Consequently, a new National Assembly was elected in order to elaborate a new constitutional draft. The MRP, which led the "No" coalition, became the largest party with more votes and seats than the PCF. The Communists and the Socialists no longer formed a majority, so the MRP was a necessary partner for the writing of a constitutional text. Its leader Georges Bidault took the lead role in the provisional government.

== Results ==
Party	Votes	%	Seats
Popular Republican Movement	5,589,059	28.11	160
French Communist Party	5,199,111	26.15	146
French Section of the Workers' International	4,187,818	21.06	115
Republican Party of Liberty	2,539,845	12.78	62
Radical Socialist Party	2,295,119	11.54	39
Others	69,789	0.35	0
Total	19,880,741	100.00	522
Valid votes	19,880,741	98.35	
Invalid/blank votes	334,459	1.65	
Total votes	20,215,200	100.00	
Registered voters/turnout	24,696,949	81.85	
Source: Nohlen & Stöver
