= List of elections in 1946 =

The following elections occurred in the year 1946.

== Africa ==
- French legislative election, November 1946 (French Equatorial Africa)
- French legislative election, November 1946 (Guinea)
- 1946 Liberian constitutional referendum
- 1946–1947 Moyen-Congo Representative Council election
- 1946 Southern Rhodesian general election
- 1946 Ubangi-Shari Representative Council election

== Asia ==
- 1946 Afghan parliamentary election
- 1946–47 Iraqi parliamentary election
- 1946 Japanese general election
- 1946 North Korean local elections
- 1946 Philippine general election:
  - 1946 Philippine presidential election
  - 1946 Philippine House of Representatives elections
  - 1946 Philippine Senate election
- 1946 Siamese general election
- 1946 South Korean legislative election
- 1946 Soviet Union legislative election
- 1946 North Vietnamese legislative election
- 1946 Turkish general election
- 1946 Turkish presidential election

=== India ===
- 1946 Indian provincial elections
  - 1946 Madras Presidency legislative assembly election
  - 1946 Madras Presidency legislative council election
  - 1946 Bengal Legislative Assembly election

== Europe ==
- 1946 Belgian general election
- Bulgaria:
  - Bulgarian republic referendum, 8 September 1946
  - Bulgarian Constitutional Assembly election, 27 October 1946
- Czechoslovakia:
  - 1946 Czechoslovak parliamentary election
  - 1946 Czechoslovak presidential election
  - 1946 Slovak parliamentary election
- 1946 Danish local elections
- 1946 Dutch general election
- 1946 Faroese general election
- 1946 Finnish presidential election
- Germany:
  - 30. June Wahl zur Verfassunggebenden Landesversammlung Württemberg-Baden
  - 30. June Wahl zur Verfassunggebenden Landesversammlung in Bayern
  - 30. June Wahl zur Verfassungsberatenden Landesversammlung in Groß Hessen
  - In September Kommunalwahlen in der Sowjetischen Besatzungszone (SBZ)
  - 13. October Bürgerschaftswahl in Bremen
  - 13. October in Hamburg
  - 20. October Landtagswahlen in Soviet occupation zone (Brandenburg, Mecklenburg-Vorpommern, Sachsen, Sachsen-Anhalt and Thüringen)
  - 1946 Berlin state election
  - 24. November in Württemberg-Baden
  - 1. December in Bayern
  - 1. Dezember in Hessen
- Greece:
  - 1946 Greek legislative election
  - 1946 Greek referendum
- 1946 Icelandic parliamentary election
- Italy:
  - 1946 Italian constitutional referendum
  - 1946 Italian general election
  - 1946 Italian presidential election
- 1946 Monegasque general election
- 1946 Romanian general election
- 1946 Serbian parliamentary election
- 1946 Soviet Union legislative election
- 1946 Swiss referendums
- 1946 Turkish general election
- 1946 Turkish presidential election

=== France ===
- May 1946 French constitutional referendum
- June 1946 French legislative election
- October 1946 French constitutional referendum
- November 1946 French legislative election

=== United Kingdom ===
- 1946 Aberdare by-election
- 1946 Aberdeen South by-election
- 1946 Battersea North by-election
- 1946 Bexley by-election
- 1946 Combined English Universities by-election
- 1946 Combined Scottish Universities by-election
- 1946 Down by-election
- 1946 Glasgow Bridgeton by-election
- 1946 Glasgow Cathcart by-election
- 1946 Hemsworth by-election
- 1946 Heywood and Radcliffe by-election
- 1946 Kilmarnock by-election
- 1946 Ogmore by-election
- 1946 Paddington North by-election
- 1946 Preston by-election
- 1946 Rotherhithe by-election
- 1946 South Ayrshire by-election

==== English local ====
- 1946 Manchester Council election

== Americas ==
=== Canada ===
- 1946 Edmonton municipal election
- 1946 Ottawa municipal election
- 1946 Toronto municipal election

=== Mexico ===
- 1946 Mexican general election

=== Caribbean ===
- 1946 Antigua and Barbuda general election
- 1946 Cuban parliamentary election
- 1946 Dominican Republic Constitutional Assembly election
- 1946 Haitian parliamentary election
- 1946 Trinidad and Tobago general election

=== South America ===
- 1946 Argentine general election
- 1946 Chilean presidential election
- 1946 Colombian presidential election
- 1946 Uruguayan general election
- 1946 Venezuelan Constituent Assembly election

=== United States ===
- 1946 New York state election
- 1946 United States elections

==== United States lieutenant gubernatorial ====
- 1946 Alabama lieutenant gubernatorial election
- 1946 California lieutenant gubernatorial election
- 1946 Connecticut lieutenant gubernatorial election
- 1946 Georgia lieutenant gubernatorial election
- 1946 Minnesota lieutenant gubernatorial election
- 1946 Nebraska lieutenant gubernatorial election
- 1946 Texas lieutenant gubernatorial election
- 1946 Wisconsin lieutenant gubernatorial election

==== United States gubernatorial ====
- 1946 Alabama gubernatorial election
- 1946 Arizona gubernatorial election
- 1946 Arkansas gubernatorial election
- 1946 California gubernatorial election
- 1946 Colorado gubernatorial election
- 1946 Connecticut gubernatorial election
- 1946 Georgia gubernatorial election
- 1946 Idaho gubernatorial election
- 1946 Iowa gubernatorial election
- 1946 Kansas gubernatorial election
- 1946 Maine gubernatorial election
- 1946 Maryland gubernatorial election
- 1946 Massachusetts gubernatorial election
- 1946 Michigan gubernatorial election
- 1946 Minnesota gubernatorial election
- 1946 Nebraska gubernatorial election
- 1946 Nevada gubernatorial election
- 1946 New Hampshire gubernatorial election
- 1946 New Jersey gubernatorial election
- 1946 New Mexico gubernatorial election
- 1946 New York gubernatorial election
- 1946 North Dakota gubernatorial election
- 1946 Ohio gubernatorial election
- 1946 Oklahoma gubernatorial election
- 1946 Oregon gubernatorial election
- 1946 Pennsylvania gubernatorial election
- 1946 Rhode Island gubernatorial election
- 1946 South Carolina gubernatorial election
- 1946 South Dakota gubernatorial election
- 1946 Tennessee gubernatorial election
- 1946 Texas gubernatorial election
- 1946 United States gubernatorial elections
- 1946 Vermont gubernatorial election
- 1946 Wisconsin gubernatorial election
- 1946 Wyoming gubernatorial election

==== United States House of Representatives ====
- 1946 United States House of Representatives elections

==== United States Senate ====
- 1946 United States Senate elections
- 1946 United States Senate special election in Alabama
- 1946 United States Senate election in Arizona
- 1946 United States Senate elections in California
- 1946 United States Senate elections in Connecticut
- 1946 United States Senate election in Delaware
- 1946 United States Senate election in Florida
- 1946 United States Senate special election in Idaho
- 1946 United States Senate election in Indiana
- 1946 United States Senate special election in Kentucky
- 1946 United States Senate election in Maine
- 1946 United States Senate election in Maryland
- 1946 United States Senate election in Massachusetts
- 1946 United States Senate election in Michigan
- 1946 United States Senate election in Minnesota
- 1946 United States Senate election in Mississippi
- 1946 United States Senate election in Missouri
- 1946 United States Senate election in Montana
- 1946 United States Senate election in Nebraska
- 1946 United States Senate election in Nevada
- 1946 United States Senate election in New Jersey
- 1946 United States Senate election in New Mexico
- 1946 United States Senate election in New York
- 1946 United States Senate election in North Dakota
- 1946 United States Senate special election in North Dakota
- 1946 United States Senate elections in Ohio
- 1946 United States Senate election in Pennsylvania
- 1946 United States Senate election in Tennessee
- 1946 United States Senate election in Texas
- 1946 United States Senate election in Vermont
- 1946 United States Senate election in Virginia
- 1946 United States Senate special election in Virginia
- 1946 United States Senate election in Washington
- 1946 United States Senate election in Wisconsin
- 1946 United States Senate election in Wyoming

==== United States mayoral elections ====
- 1946 New Orleans mayoral election

== Oceania ==
- 1946 New Zealand general election

=== Australia ===
- 1946 Australian federal election
- 1946 Albury state by-election
- 1946 Ashfield state by-election
- 1946 Auburn state by-election
- 1946 Corowa state by-election
- 1946 Goulburn state by-election
- 1946 Henty by-election
- 1946 Australian referendum
- 1946 Tasmanian state election
- 1946 Wimmera by-election

== See also ==
- Category:1946 elections
