= November 1946 French legislative election =

- 10 November 1946

All 627 seats to the French National Assembly 314 seats were needed for a majority
- Turnout: 78.05% (▼3.8 pp)
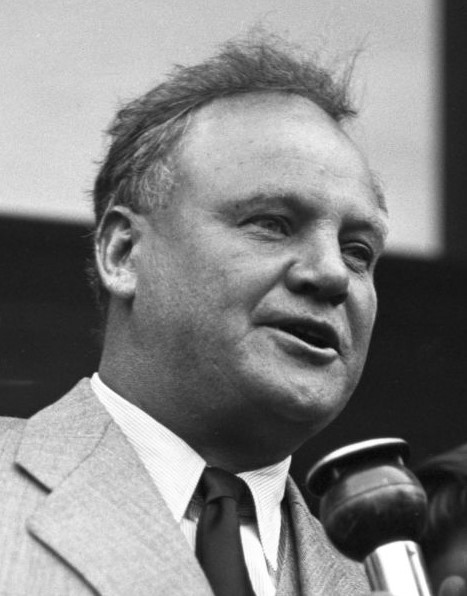

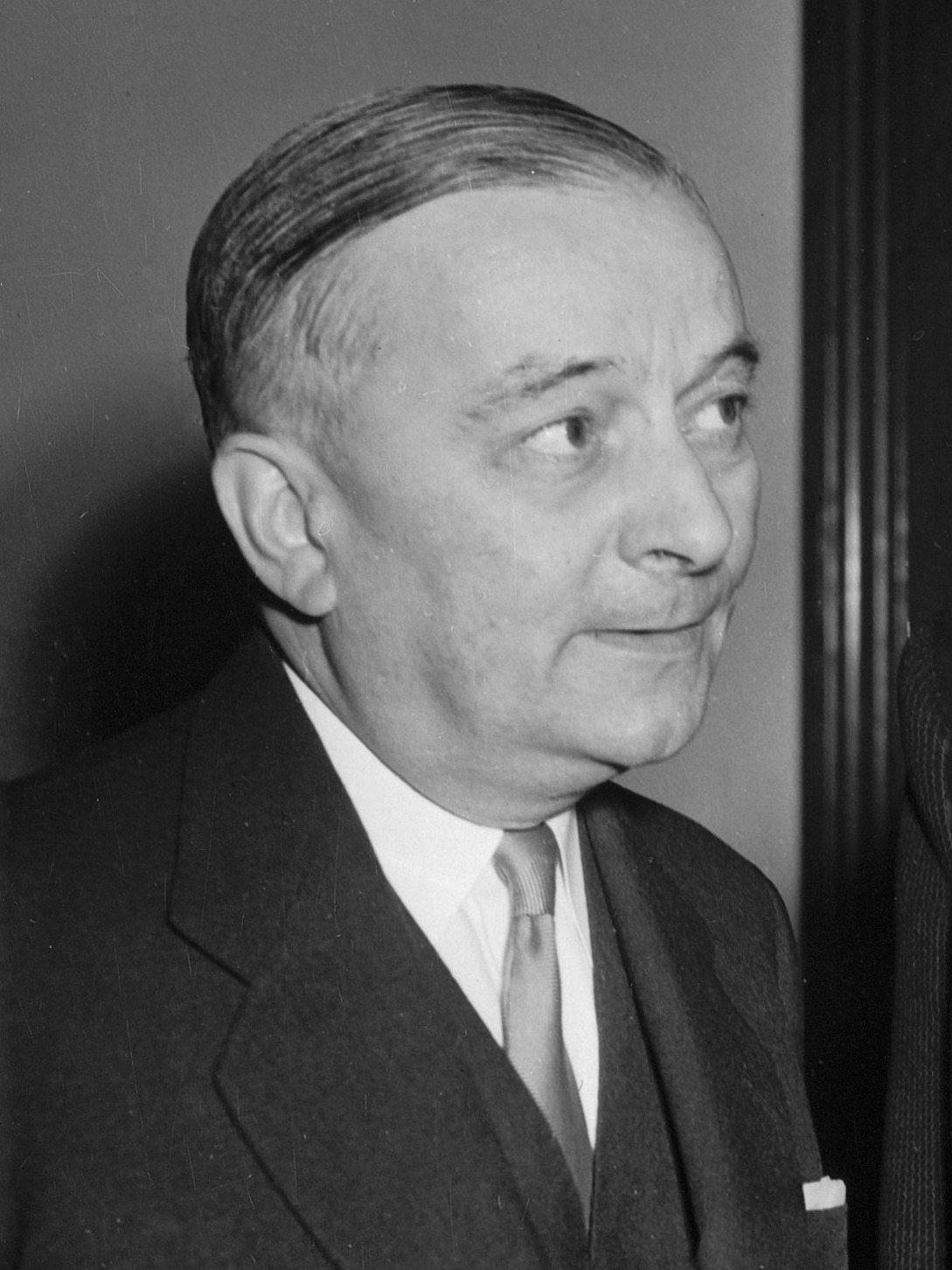

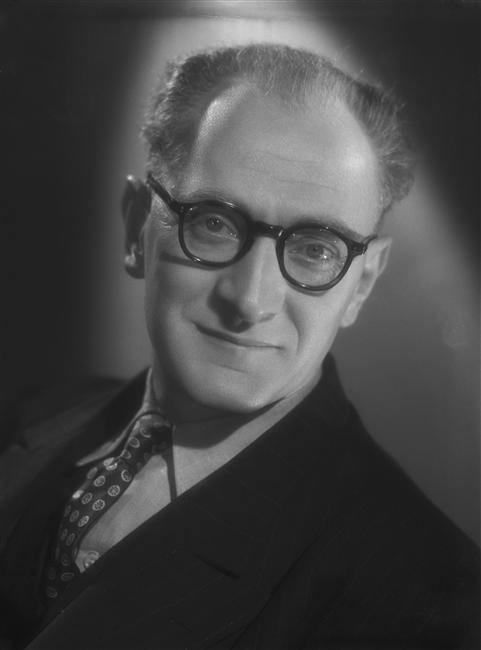

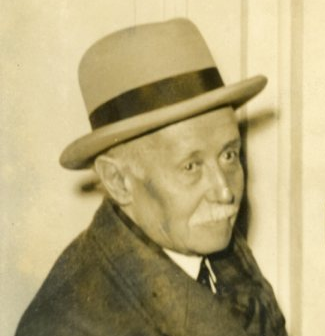
	Majority party	Minority party	Third party
Leader	Maurice Thorez	Georges Bidault	Guy Mollet
Party	PCF	MRP	SFIO
Leader's seat	Seine	Loire	Pas-de-Calais
Last election	153 seats	166 seats	128 seats
Seats won	182	173	102
Seat change	▲29	▲7	▼26
Popular vote	5,430,593	4,988,609	3,433,901
Percentage	28.26%	25.96%	17.87%
	Fourth party	Fifth party
Leader	Michel Clemenceau	Jean-Paul David
Party	PRL	RGR
Leader's seat	Seine-et-Marne	Seine-et-Oise
Last election	67 seats^{*}	52 seats
Seats won	72^{*}	69
Seat change	▲5	▲17
Popular vote	2,487,313	2,136,152
Percentage	12.94%	11.12%
- Results by department
Prime Minister before election
Georges Bidault
MRP
Elected Prime Minister
Léon Blum
SFIO

Legislative elections were held in France on 10 November 1946 to elect the first National Assembly of the Fourth Republic. The electoral system used was proportional representation.

After the rejection of a first constitutional draft (5 May 1946 referendum), a new provisional National Assembly was elected to elaborate a second text. The Christian democrat leader Georges Bidault (Popular Republican Movement, MRP) led a government which included socialists (French Section of the Workers' International, SFIO) and Communists (French Communist Party, PCF). This Three-parties alliance proposed the establishment of a parliamentary system.

Advocating a presidential government, General Charles de Gaulle campaigned for a "No" vote. He warned against the "regime of the parties" which was, according to him, responsible for the 1940 collapse. His followers founded the Gaullist Union. The Rally of the Republican Lefts (an electoral alliance dominated by the Radical Party) and the classical Right also campaigned for a "No", because they were opposed to a constitutional change and to the economic policy of the three-parties alliance. Despite this, the second constitutional draft was approved by 13 October 1946 referendum.

The French voters were called to elect the first Assembly of the Fourth Republic. The Three-parties alliance won with a comfortable majority. The PCF regained its position as the largest party to the detriment of the Christian democrats. It obtained the best electoral result in its history. The MRP and the SFIO vote decreased slightly.

Consequently, the PCF leader Maurice Thorez demanded to lead the government but his allies refused. Finally, the SFIO former prime minister Léon Blum took the head of the Cabinet. Furthermore, another socialist, Vincent Auriol, was elected President of France. The SFIO benefited from its position in the middle of the governmental alliance. However, the alliance split in due to the 1947 strikes and the beginning of the Cold War. The Communist ministers were dismissed by socialist Prime Minister Paul Ramadier. The SFIO, the MRP, the Radicals and the classical right allied to form the Third Force coalition, against the Communists on the one hand and the Gaullists on the other.

== Results ==
Party	Votes	%	Seats
French Communist Party	5,489,288	28.59	166
Popular Republican Movement	5,058,307	26.34	158
French Section of the Workers' International	3,431,954	17.87	90
Conservatives (AD–DM–ER–PP–PRL)	2,465,526	12.84	70
Radicals (RS–RG–IG–PRRS–RGR)	2,381,385	12.40	55
Gaullists	312,632	1.63	5
Others	63,979	0.33	0
Total	19,203,071	100.00	544
Valid votes	19,203,071	98.15	
Invalid/blank votes	362,672	1.85	
Total votes	19,565,743	100.00	
Registered voters/turnout	25,052,523	78.10	
Source: Nohlen & Stöver

=== In the colonies ===
- Algeria
- Cameroon
- Chad-Ubangi-Shari
- Comoros
- Dahomey-Togo
- Somaliland
- Soudan-Niger
- Gabon-Moyen Congo
- Guinea
- Ivory Coast
- Mauritania-Senegal
- Morocco
- Tunisia

== See also ==
- List of elections in 1946
  - November 1946 French legislative election in Gabon–Moyen Congo
