= November 1946 French legislative election in Senegal =

Elections to the French National Assembly were held in Senegal on 10 November 1946 as part of the wider French elections. Two members were elected from the territory, both of which were won by the French Section of the Workers' International. The seats were taken by Lamine Guèye and Léopold Sédar Senghor, who had also won the seats in the June elections.

== Results ==
Party	Votes	%	Seats	+/–
French Section of the Workers' International	128,284	98.59	2	0
African Democratic Rally	1,180	0.91	0	New
Intercolonial Front	654	0.50	0	New
Total	130,118	100.00	2	0
Valid votes	130,118	99.56		
Invalid/blank votes	573	0.44		
Total votes	130,691	100.00		
Registered voters/turnout	192,861	67.76		
Source: Sternberger et al.
