= Félix Houphouët-Boigny =

First president of Ivory Coast, from 1960 to 1993

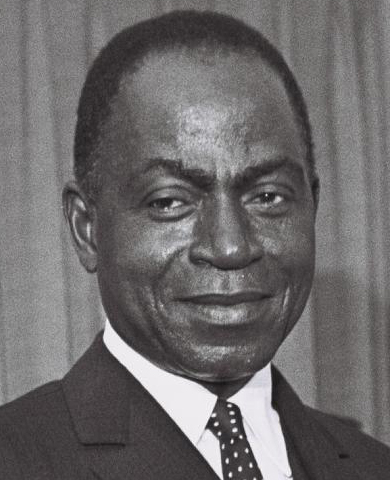
- Houphouët-Boigny in 1962

1st President of Ivory Coast
- In office 3 November 1960 – 7 December 1993
- Preceded by: Position established
- Succeeded by: Henri Konan Bédié

1st Prime Minister of Ivory Coast
- In office 7 August 1960 – 27 November 1960
- Preceded by: Auguste Denise (As Minister)
- Succeeded by: Alassane Ouattara (1990)

Personal details
- Born: Dia Houphouët; 18 October 1905 Yamoussoukro, French West Africa
- Died: 7 December 1993 (aged 88) Yamoussoukro, Ivory Coast
- Party: Democratic Party
- Other political affiliations: Rassemblement Démocratique Africain
- Spouses: Kady Racine Sow (m. 1930; div. 1952); Marie-Thérèse Brou (m. 1952)
- Children: Guillaume Houphouët-Boigny

Félix Houphouët-Boigny (French: [feliks ufwɛ(t) bwaɲi]; 18 October 1905 – 7 December 1993), affectionately called Papa Houphouët or Le Vieux ("the old one"), was an Ivorian politician and physician who served as the first president of Ivory Coast, from 1960 until his death in 1993. A tribal chief, he worked as a medical aide, union leader, and planter before being elected to the French Parliament in 1945. He served in several ministerial positions within the Government of France before leading Ivory Coast following independence in 1960. Throughout his life, he played a significant role in politics and the decolonisation of Africa.

Under Houphouët-Boigny's politically rightist leadership, Ivory Coast prospered economically. This success, uncommon in poverty-ridden West Africa, became known as the "Ivorian miracle"; it was due to a combination of sound planning, the maintenance of strong ties with the West (particularly France), and development of the country's significant coffee and cocoa industries. However, reliance on the agricultural sector caused difficulties in 1980, after a sharp drop in the prices of coffee and cocoa.

Throughout his presidency, Houphouët-Boigny maintained a close relationship with France, a policy known as Françafrique, and he built strong ties with Jacques Foccart, the chief adviser on African policy in the French government under Charles de Gaulle and Georges Pompidou. He aided the conspirators who ousted Kwame Nkrumah from power in Ghana in 1966, took part in the failed coup against Mathieu Kérékou in Benin in 1977, was suspected of involvement in the 1987 coup d'état that removed Thomas Sankara from power in Burkina Faso, and provided assistance to UNITA, a United States-supported, anti-communist rebel movement led by Jonas Savimbi in Angola. Houphouët-Boigny maintained a strong anti-communist foreign policy, which resulted in, among other things, severing diplomatic relations with the Soviet Union in 1969 (after first establishing relations in 1967) and refusing to recognise the People's Republic of China until 1983. He re-established relations with the Soviet Union in 1986.

In the West, Houphouët-Boigny was commonly known as the "Sage of Africa" or the "Grand Old Man of Africa". Houphouët-Boigny moved the country's capital from Abidjan to his hometown of Yamoussoukro and built the world's largest church there, the Basilica of Our Lady of Peace, at a cost of US$300 million. At the time of his death, he was the longest-serving leader in Africa's history and the third longest-serving leader in the world, after Fidel Castro of Cuba and Kim Il Sung of North Korea. In 1989, UNESCO created the Félix Houphouët-Boigny Peace Prize for the "safeguarding, maintaining and seeking of peace".

After his death, conditions in Ivory Coast quickly deteriorated. Between 1994 and 2002, there were a number of coups, a devaluation of the CFA franc, and an economic recession; a civil war began in 2002.

== Early life ==
=== Birth, childhood and education ===
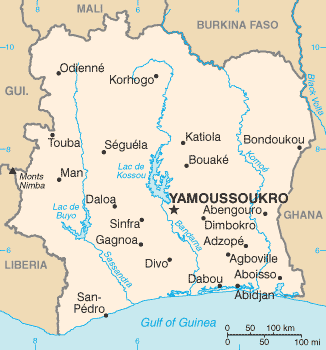
Map of Côte d'Ivoire

According to his official biography, Houphouët-Boigny was probably born on 18 October 1905, in Yamoussoukro to a family of hereditary chiefs of the Baoulé people. Unofficial accounts, however, place his birth date up to seven years earlier. Born into the animist Akouès tribe, he was named Dia Houphouët: his first name Dia means "prophet" or "magician". His father was N'Doli Houphouët. Dia Houphouët was the great-nephew through his mother of Queen Yamousso and the village chief, Kouassi N'Go. When N'Go was murdered in 1910, Dia was named to succeed him as chief. Due to his young age, his stepfather Gbro Diby ruled as regent until Dia came of age; Dia's father had already died.

Houphouët-Boigny descended from tribal chiefs through his mother, Kimou N'Dri (also known as N'Dri Kan). She died much later in 1936. Doubts remain as to the identity of his father, N'Doli. Officially a native of the N'Zipri of Didiévi tribe, N'Doli Houphouët died shortly after the birth of his son Augustin, although no reliable information regarding his death exists. Houphouët-Boigny had two elder sisters, Faitai (1898?–1998) and Adjoua (d. 1987), as well as a younger brother Augustin (d. 1939).

The French colonial administration recognised tribal leaders; they arranged to have Houphouët go to school at the military post in Bonzi, not far from his village, to prepare for his future as a leader, despite strenuous objections from relatives, especially his great-aunt Queen Yamousso. In 1915, he was transferred to the école primaire supérieure (secondary) at Bingerville in spite of his family's reluctance to have him go to boarding school. The same year, at Bingerville, Houphouët converted to Christianity; he considered it a modern religion and an obstacle to the spread of Islam. He chose to be christened Félix.

First in his class, Houphouët was accepted into the École normale supérieure William Ponty in 1919, and earned a teaching degree. In 1921, he attended the École de médecine de l'AOF (French West Africa School of Medicine) in French Senegal, where he came first in his class in 1925 and qualified as a medical assistant. As he never completed his studies in medicine, he could qualify only as a médecin africain, a poorly paid doctor.

=== Medical career ===
On 26 October 1925, Houphouët began his career as a doctor's aide at a hospital in Abidjan, where he founded an association of indigenous medical personnel. This undertaking proved short-lived as the colonial administration viewed it unsympathetically, considering it a trade union. As a consequence, they decided to move Houphouët to a lesser hospital in Guiglo on 27 April 1927. After he proved his considerable talents, however, he was promoted on 17 September 1929 to a post in Abengourou, which until then had been reserved for Europeans. At Abengourou, Houphouët witnessed the mistreatment of indigenous cocoa farmers by the colonists.

In 1932, he decided to act, leading a movement of farmers against the influential white landowners and for the economic policies of the colonial government, who favoured the farmers. On 22 December, he published an article titled "On nous a trop volés" (They have stolen too much from us), in the Trait d'union, an Ivorian socialist newspaper. It was published under a pseudonym.

The following year, Houphouët was called by his tribe to assume the responsibilities of village chief. Preferring to pursue his medical career, he relinquished the office to his younger brother Augustin. Wishing to live closer to his village, he obtained a transfer to Dimbokro on 3 February 1934 and then to Toumodi on 28 June 1936. While Houphouët had displayed professional qualities, his attitude had chafed those around him. As a result, in September 1938, his clinical director demanded that he choose between his job as a doctor and his involvement in local politics. The choice was quickly made for him: his brother died in 1939, and Houphouët became the chef de canton (an office created by the colonial administration to collect taxes). Due to this, Houphouët ended his medical career the next year.

=== First marriage ===
In 1930, Houphouët married Kady Racine Sow (1913–2006) in Abengourou; their union was controversial because he was a practising Catholic and she was the daughter of a wealthy Muslim from Senegal. The families of the two eventually overcame their opposition and accepted the interfaith union, the first ever celebrated in Ivory Coast. The couple had five children: Felix (who died in infancy), Augustine, Francis, Guillaume and Marie, all raised as Catholics.

=== Chef de canton and union leader ===
By becoming chef de canton, Houphouët assumed responsibility for the administration of Akouè, a canton which comprised 36 villages. He also took charge of the family plantation—at the time one of the most important in the country—and worked to diversify its rubber, cocoa and coffee crops. He soon became one of Africa's richest farmers. On 3 September 1944, he established, in cooperation with the colonial administration, the African Agricultural Union (Syndicat agricole africain, SAA). Under his presidency, the SAA brought together African farmers who were dissatisfied with their working conditions and worked to protect their interests against those of European planters. Anti-colonialist and anti-racist, the organisation demanded better working conditions, higher wages, and the abolition of the forced labour. The union quickly received the support of nearly 20,000 plantation workers, together with that of the left-wing French administrators placed in office by the Provisional Government. Its success irritated colonists to the extent that they took legal action against Houphouët, accusing him of being anti-French for never seeking French citizenship. However, Houphouët befriended the Inspector Minister of the Colonies, who ordered the charges dropped. They were more successful in obtaining the replacement of the sympathetic Governor André Latrille with the hostile Governor Henry de Mauduit.

Houphouët entered electoral politics in August 1945, when elections for the Abidjan city council were held for the first time. The French electoral rules established a common roll: half of the elected would have to be French citizens (who were mostly Europeans) and the other half non-citizens. Houphouët reacted by creating a multi-ethnic all-African roll with both non-citizens and citizens (mostly Senegalese with French citizenship). As a result, most of the African contenders withdrew and a large number of the French protested by abstaining, thus assuring a decisive victory for his African Bloc.

In October 1945, Houphouët moved onto the national political scene; the French government decided to represent its colonies in the assemblée constituante (Constituent Assembly) and gave Côte d'Ivoire and Upper Volta two representatives in Parliament combined. One of these would represent the French citizens and another would represent the indigenous population, but the suffrage was limited to less than 1% of the population. In an attempt to block Houphouët, the governor de Mauduit supported a rival candidature, Tenga Ouedraogo, and provided him the full backing of the administration. Despite that and thanks to the SAA's strong organization, Houphouët, running for the indigenous seat, easily came first with a 1,000-vote margin. He failed, however, to obtain a majority, due to the large number of candidates running. Houphouët emerged victorious again in the second round of elections held on 4 November 1945, in which he narrowly defeated an Upper Voltan candidate with 12,980 votes out of a total of 31,081. At this point, he decided to add "Boigny" to his surname, meaning "irresistible force" in Baoulé and symbolizing his role as a leader.

== French political career ==
=== Member of Parliament ===
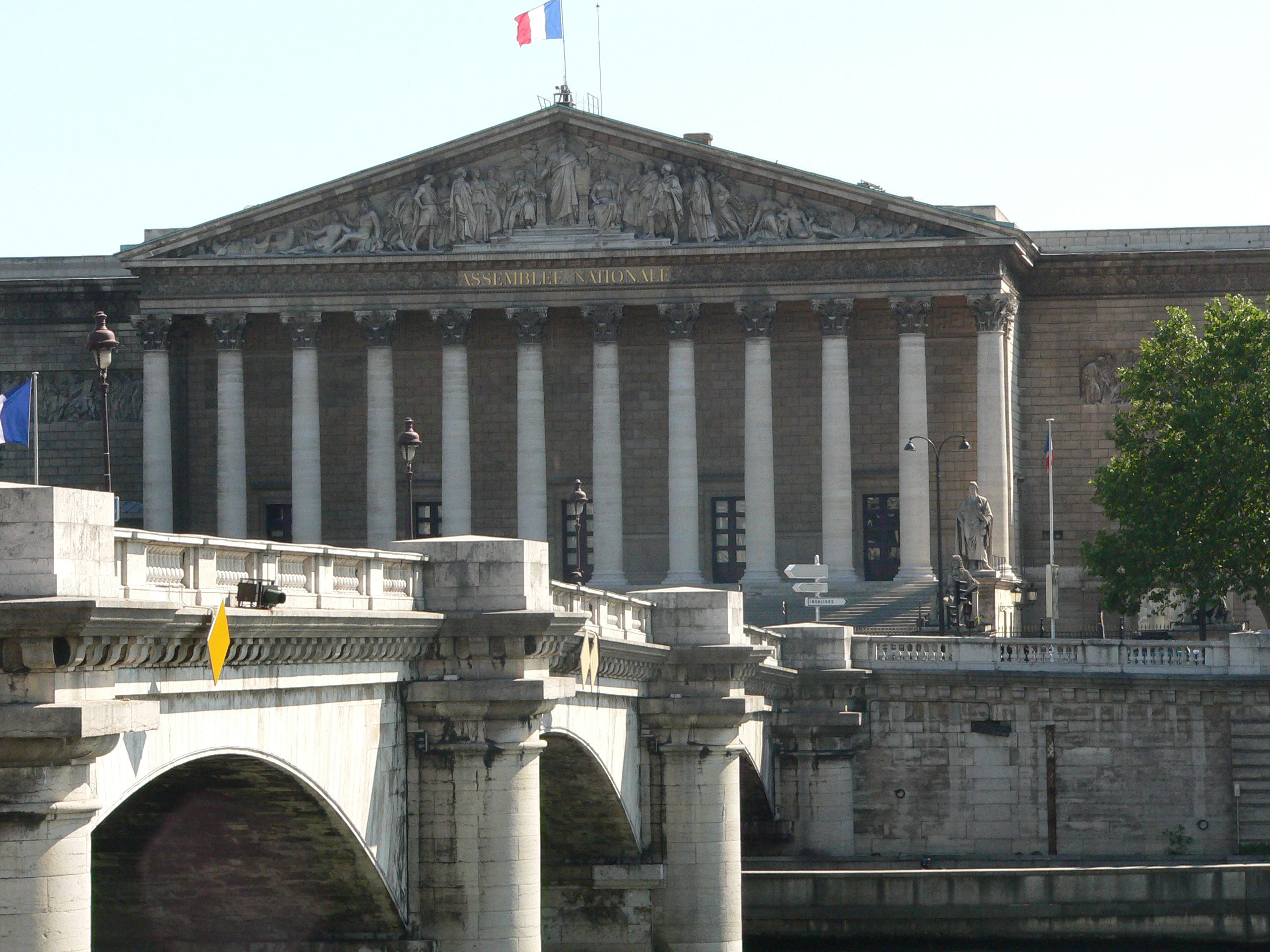
The Palais Bourbon, where Houphouët-Boigny was appointed to the territorial commission

In taking his seat at the National Assembly in the Palais Bourbon alongside compatriots Daniel Ouezzin Coulibaly and Zinda Kaboré, Houphouët-Boigny had to first decide with which group to side, and he opted for the Mouvements unis de la Résistance (Unified Resistance Movements), a small party composed of Communist sympathizers but not formal members of the Communist Party. He was appointed a member of the Commission des territoires d'outre-mer (Commission of Overseas Territories). During this time, he worked to implement the wishes of the SAA, in particular proposing a bill to abolish forced labor—the single most unpopular feature of French rule. The Assembly adopted this bill, known as Loi Houphouët-Boigny, on 11 April 1946, greatly enhancing the author's prestige beyond his country. On 3 April 1946, Houphouët-Boigny proposed to unify labour regulations in the territories of Africa; this would eventually be completed in 1952. Finally, on 27 September 1946, he filed a report on the public health system of overseas territories, calling for its reformation. Houphouët-Boigny in his parliamentary tenure supported the idea of a union of French territories.

As the first constitution proposed by the Constituent Assembly was rejected by the voters, new elections were held in 1946 for a second constituent assembly. For these elections Houphouët-Boigny organized on 9 April 1946, with the help of the Communist Study Groups, the Democratic Party of Ivory Coast – African Democratic Rally (PDCI), whose structure closely followed that of the SAA. It immediately became the first successful independent African party when the new party Houphouët-Boigny easily swept the elections with 21,099 out of 37,888 votes, his opponents obtaining only a few hundred votes each. In this he was helped by the recall of Governor Latrille, whose predecessor had been fired by the Overseas Minister Marius Moutet for his opposition to the abolition of the indigénat.

With his return to the assembly he was appointed to the Commission du règlement et du suffrage universel (Commission for Regulation of Universal Suffrage); as secretary of the commission from 1947 to 1948, he proposed on 18 February 1947 to reform French West Africa (AOF), French Equatorial Africa (AEF), and the French territories' federal council to better represent the African peoples. He also called for the creation of local assemblies in Africa so that Africans could learn how to be politically autonomous.

=== Foundation of the RDA and Communist alliance ===
During the holding of the second Constituent Assembly the African representatives witnessed a strong reaction against the colonial liberalism that had been embedded in the rejected constitution drafted by the previous assembly. The new text, approved by the voters on 13 October 1946, reduced the African representatives from 30 to 24, and reduced the number of those entitled to vote; also, a large number of colonial topics were left in which the executive could govern by decree, and supervision over the colonial administration remained weak. Reacting to what they felt was a betrayal of the MRP's and the Socialists' promises, the African deputies concluded they needed to build a permanent coalition independent from the French parties. Houphouët-Boigny was the first to propose this to his African colleagues, and obtained their full support for a founding congress to be held in October at Bamako in French Sudan. The French government did all it could to sabotage the congress, and in particular the Socialist Overseas Minister was successful in persuading the African Socialists, who were originally among the promoters, from attending. This ultimately backfired, radicalizing those convened; when they founded the African Democratic Rally (RDA) as an inter-territorial political movement, it was the pro-Communist Gabriel d'Arboussier who dominated the congress. The new movement's goal was to free "Africa from the colonial yoke by the affirmation of her personality and by the association, freely agreed to, of a union of nations". Its first president, confirmed several times subsequently, was Houphouët-Boigny, while d'Arboussier became secretary-general. As part of the bringing of the territorial parties in the organization, the PDCI became the Ivoirian branch of the RDA.

Too small to form their own parliamentary group, the African deputies were compelled to join one of the larger parties to sit together in the Palais Bourbon. Thus, the RDA soon joined the French Communist Party (PCF) as the only openly anti-colonialist political faction and soon organised strikes and boycotts of European imports. Houphouët-Boigny justified the alliance because it seemed, at the time, to be the only way for his voice to be heard: "Even before the creation of RDA, the alliance had served our cause: in March 1946, the abolition of compulsory labour was adopted unanimously, without a vote, thanks to our tactical alliance." During his stays in Paris, he travelled in a black limousine to the PCF executive school. On the strength of this contrast, he defends himself from any communist sympathy: "Can I, Houphouet, traditional leader, doctor, big owner, Catholic, can we say that I am a communist?"

As the Cold War set in, the alliance with the Communists became increasingly damaging for the RDA. The French colonial administration showed itself increasingly hostile toward the RDA and its president, whom the administration called a "Stalinist". Repression against his party, the PDCI, was increasing in Ivory Coast. Activists are regularly arrested and beaten by police officers, sometimes with acts of torture; others are fired from their jobs. One of the party's main leaders, Senator Biaka Boda, was found hanging and shredded in the forest while wanted by the police. Houphouët-Boigny was afraid for his life and for the existence of the movement. Tensions reached their height at the beginning of 1950, when, following an outbreak of anti-colonial violence, almost the entire PDCI leadership was arrested; Houphouët-Boigny managed to slip away shortly before police arrived at his house. Although Houphouët-Boigny would have been saved by his parliamentary immunity, his missed arrest was popularly attributed to his influence and his prestige. In the ensuing chaos, riots broke out in Ivory Coast; the most significant of which was a clash with the police at Dimbokro in which 13 Africans were killed and 50 wounded. According to official figures, by 1951 a total of 52 Africans had been killed, several hundred wounded and around 3,000 arrested (numbers which, according to an opinion reported by journalist Ronald Segal in African Profiles, are certainly underestimated). To defuse the crisis, Prime Minister René Pleven entrusted the France's Minister for Overseas Territories, François Mitterrand, with the task of detaching the RDA from the PCF, and in fact an official alliance between the RDA and Mitterrand's party, the UDSR, was established in 1952. Knowing he was at an impasse, in October 1950, Houphouët-Boigny agreed to break the Communist alliance. Asked in an undated interview why he worked with the communists, Houphouët-Boigny replied: "I, a bourgeois landowner, I would preach the class struggle? That is why we aligned ourselves with the Communist Party, without joining it." A 1954 report from the French military authorities points out that Houphouët-Boigny "conducted his game alone with great flexibility, procrastination and Machiavellian roueries, refraining from convening either the Coordination Committee or the party congress, which could have opposed this volte-face and gradually became a pro-administrative party. The secretary general of the RDA, Gabriel d'Arboussier, denounced this new line and left the party. Similarly, the Union of the Peoples of Cameroon, the Union démocratique sénégalaise and the Niger Democratic Union refuse to sever their relations with the PCF and the CGT".

=== Rehabilitation and entry into government ===
In the 1951 elections, the number of seats was reduced from three to two; while Houphouët-Boigny still won a seat, the other RDA candidate, Ouezzin Coulibaly, did not. All in all, the RDA only garnered 67,200 of 109,759 votes in that election, and the party in direct opposition to it captured a seat. On 8 August 1951, Boigny, speaking at René Pleven's inauguration as president of the board, denied being the leader of a communist group; he was not believed until the RDA's 1952 affiliation with UDSR. On the 24th of that same month, Boigny delivered a statement in the Assembly contesting the result of the elections, which he declared tainted by fraud. He also denounced what he saw as the exploitation of overseas deputies as "voting machines", who, as political pawns, supported the colonial government's every action. Thereafter, Houphouët-Boigny and the RDA were briefly unsuccessful before their success was renewed in 1956; at that year's elections, the party received 502,711 of 579,550 votes cast. From then on, his relationship with Communism was forgotten, and he was embraced as a moderate. Named as a member of the Committees on Universal Suffrage (distinct from the aforementioned committee regulating said suffrage), Constitutional Laws, Rules and Petitions. On 1 February 1956, he was appointed Minister Discharging the Duties of the Presidency of the Council in the government of Guy Mollet, a post he held until 13 June 1957. This marked the first time an African was elected to such a senior position in the French government. His principal achievement in this role was the creation of an organisation of Saharan regions that would help ensure sustainability for the French Union and counter Moroccan territorial claims in the Sahara.

On 6 November 1957, Houphouët-Boigny became Minister of Public Health and Population in the Gaillard administration and attempted to reform the public health code. Following his Gaillard ministry, he was again appointed Minister of State from 14 May 1958;– 20 May 1959. In this capacity, he participated in the development of France's African policy, notably in the cultural domain. At his behest, the Bureau of French Overseas Students and the University of Dakar were created. On 4 October 1958, Houphouët-Boigny was one of the signatories, along with de Gaulle, of the Constitution of the Fifth Republic. The last post he held in France was Minister-Counsellor in the Michel Debré government, from 23 July 1959 to 19 May 1961.

=== Leading up to independence ===
Until the mid-1950s, French colonies in west and central Africa were grouped within two federations: French Equatorial Africa (AEF) and French West Africa (AOF). Côte d'Ivoire was part of the AOF, financing roughly two-thirds of its budget. Wishing to free the country from the guardianship of the AOF, Houphouët-Boigny advocated an Africa made up of nations that would generate wealth rather than share poverty and misery. He participated actively in the drafting and adoption of the framework of the Defferre Loi Cadre, a French legal reform which, in addition to granting autonomy to African colonies, would break the ties that bound the different territories together, giving them more autonomy by means of local assemblies. The Deffere Loi Cadre was far from unanimously accepted by Houphouët-Boigny's compatriots in Africa: Léopold Sédar Senghor, leader of Senegal, was the first to speak out against this attempted "Balkanization" of Africa, arguing that the colonial territories "do not correspond to any reality: be it geographical, economic, ethnic, or linguistic". Senghor argued that maintaining the AOF would give the territories stronger political credibility and would allow them to develop harmoniously as well as emerge as a genuine people. This view was shared by most members of the African Democratic Rally, who backed Ahmed Sékou Touré and Modibo Keïta, placing Houphouët-Boigny in the minority at the 1957 congress in Bamako.

Following the adoption of the Loi Cadre reform on 23 June 1956, a territorial election was held in Ivory Coast on 3 March 1957, in which the PDCI—transformed under Houphouët-Boigny's firm control into a political machine—won many seats. Houphouët-Boigny, who was already serving as a minister in France, as President of the Territorial Assembly and as mayor of Abidjan, chose Auguste Denise to serve as Vice President of the Government Council of Ivory Coast, even though Houphouët-Boigny remained, the only interlocutor in the colony for France. Houphouët-Boigny's popularity and influence in France's African colonies had become so pervasive that one French magazine claimed that by 1956, the politician's photograph "was in all the huts, on the lapels of coats, on the corsages of African women and even on the handlebars of bicycles".

On 7 April 1957, the prime minister of Ghana, Kwame Nkrumah, on a visit to Ivory Coast, called on all colonies in Africa to declare their independence; Houphouët-Boigny retorted to Nkrumah:

Your experience is rather impressive ... But due to the human relationships between the French and the Africans, and because in the 20th century, people have become interdependent, we considered that it would perhaps be more interesting to try a new and different experience than yours and unique in itself, one of a Franco-African community based on equality and fraternity.

Unlike many African leaders who immediately demanded independence, Houphouët-Boigny wished for a careful transition within the "ensemble français" because, according to him, political independence without economic independence was worthless. He also invited Nkrumah to meet up with him in 10 years to see which one of the two had chosen the best approach toward independence. Boigny would win the wager as he ruled until till his death and brought his nation significant gains amplified by Nkruma's disastrous economic policy.

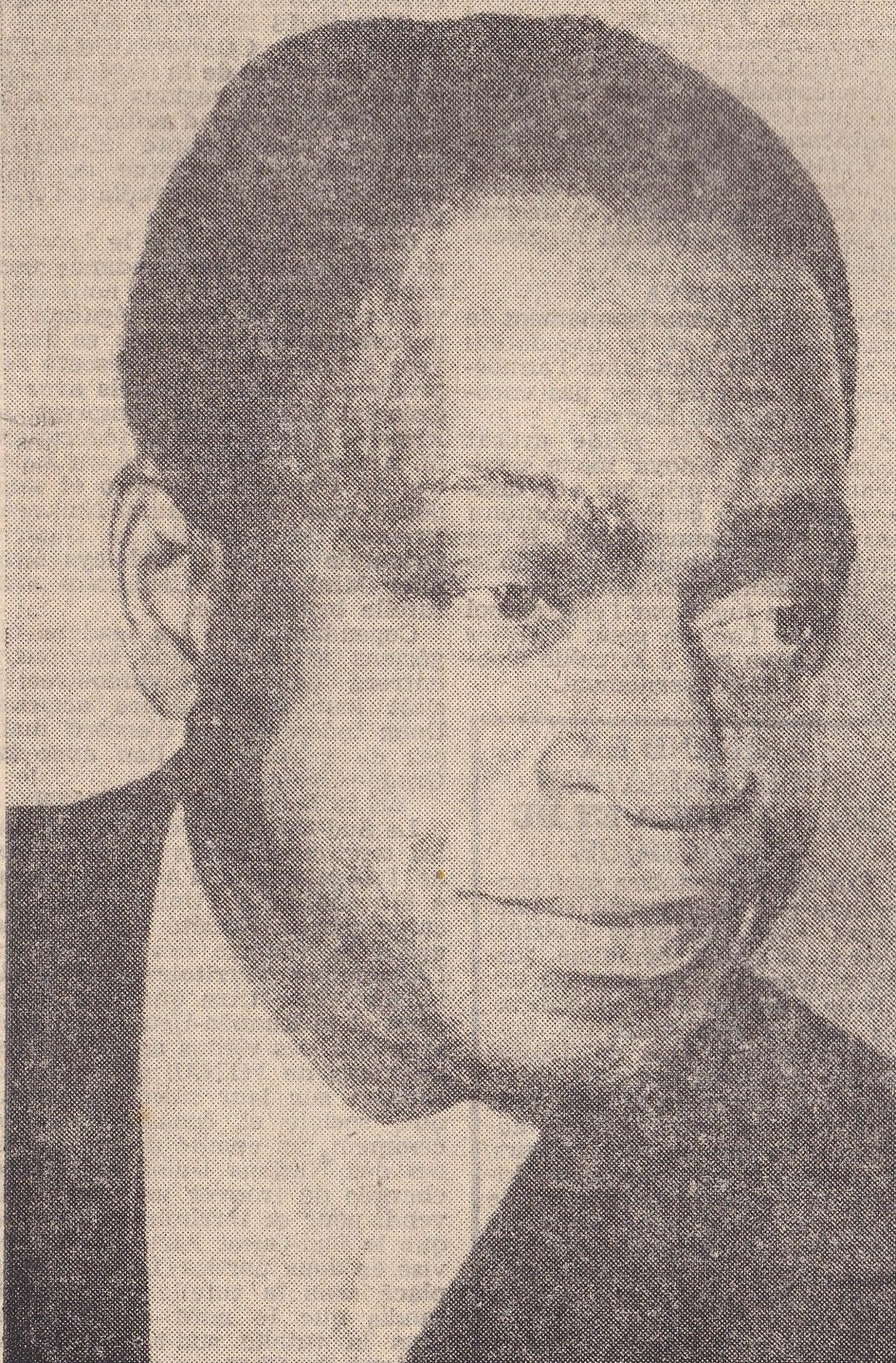
Houphouët-Boigny in 1958

On 28 September 1958 Charles de Gaulle proposed a constitutional referendum to the Franco-African community: the territories were given the choice of either supporting the constitution or proclaiming their independence and being cut off from France. For Houphouët-Boigny, the choice was simple: "Whatever happens, Côte d'Ivoire will enter directly to the Franco-African community. The other territories are free to group between themselves before joining." Only Guinea chose independence; its leader, Ahmed Sékou Touré, opposed Houphouët-Boigny, stating that his preference was "freedom in poverty over wealth in slavery". The referendum produced the French Community, an institution meant to be an association of free republics which had jurisdiction over foreign policy, defense, currency, common ethnic and financial policy, and strategic raw materials.

Houphouët-Boigny was determined to stop the hegemony of Senegal in West Africa and a political confrontation ensued between Ivorian and Senegalese leaders. Houphouët-Boigny refused to participate in the Inter-African conference in Dakar on 31 December 1958, which was intended to lay the foundation for the Federation of Francophone African States. Although that federation was never realised, Senegal and Mali (known at the time as French Sudan) formed their own political union, the Mali Federation. After de Gaulle allowed the Mali Federation independence in 1959, Houphouët-Boigny tried to sabotage the federation's efforts to wield political control; in cooperation with France, he managed to convince Upper Volta, Dahomey, and Niger to withdraw from the Mali Federation.

Two months after the 1958 referendum, seven member states of French West Africa, including Ivory Coast, became autonomous republics within the French Community. Houphouët-Boigny had won his first victory against those supporting federalism. This victory established the conditions that made the future "Ivorian miracle" possible, since between 1957 and 1959, budget revenues grew by 158%, reaching 21,723,000,000 CFA francs.

== President of Ivory Coast ==
=== Early years and second marriage ===
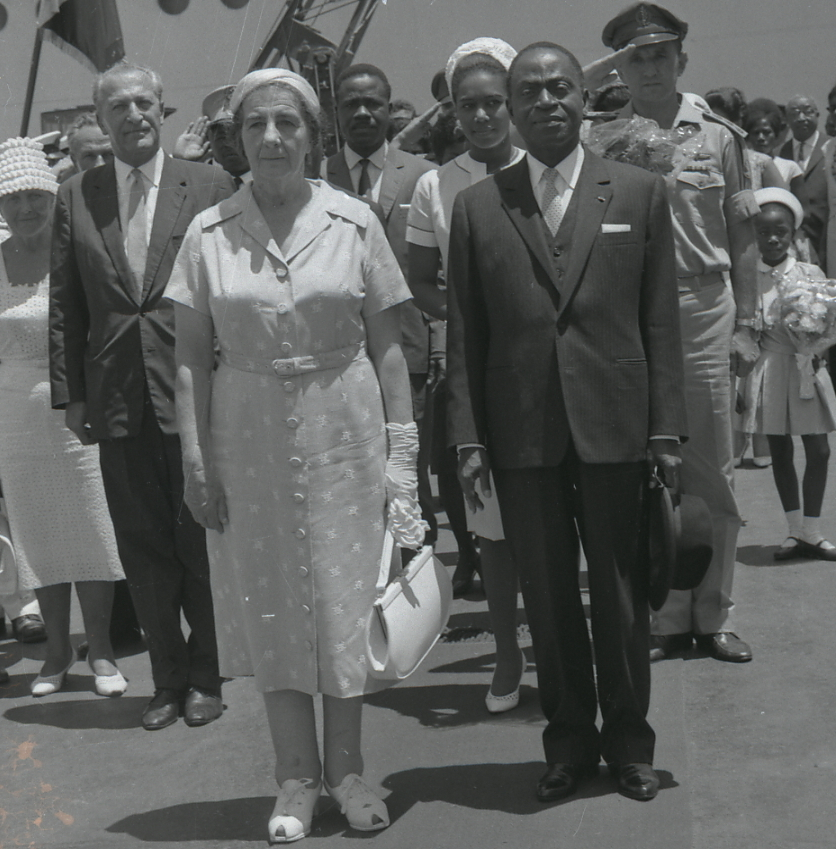
Boigny with Israeli prime minister Golda Meir, 1962

Houphouët-Boigny officially became the head of the government of Ivory Coast on 1 May 1959. Although he faced no opposition from rival parties and the PDCI became the de facto party of the state in 1957, he was confronted by opposition from his own government. Radical nationalists, led by Jean-Baptiste Mockey, openly opposed the government's Francophile policies. In an attempt to solve this problem, Houphouët-Boigny decided to exile Mockey in September 1959, claiming that Mockey had attempted to assassinate him using voodoo in what Houphouët-Boigny called the "complot du chat noir" (black cat conspiracy).

Flag of Ivory Coast

Houphouët-Boigny began drafting a new constitution for Ivory Coast after the country's independence from France on 7 August 1960. It drew heavily from the United States Constitution in establishing a powerful executive branch, and from the Constitution of France, which limited the capacities of the legislature. He transformed the National Assembly into a mere recording house for bills and budget proposals. On 27 November 1960, Houphouët-Boigny was elected unopposed to the Presidency of the Republic, while a single list of PDCI candidates was elected to the National Assembly.

1963 was marked by a series of alleged plots that played a decisive role in ultimately consolidating power in the hands of Houphouët-Boigny. There is no clear consensus on the unfolding of the 1963 events; in fact, there may have been no plot at all and the entire series of events may have been part of a plan by Houphouët-Boigny to consolidate his hold on power. Between 120 and 200 secret trials were held in Yamoussoukro, in which key political figures—including Mockey and the president of the Supreme Court Ernest Boka—were implicated. There was discontent in the army, as the generals grew restive following the arrest of Defense Minister Jean Konan Banny, and the president had to intervene personally to pacify them.

For the next 27 years, almost all power in Ivory Coast was centered in Houphouët-Boigny. From 1965 to 1985, he was reelected unopposed to five successive five-year terms. Also every five years, a single list of PDCI candidates was returned to the National Assembly. For all intents and purposes, all of them were appointed by the president, since in his capacity as leader of the PDCI he approved all candidates. He and the PDCI believed that national unity and support for the PDCI were one and the same, and that a multiparty system would waste resources and harm the country's unity. For this reason, all adult citizens were required to be members of the PDCI. The media were tightly controlled, and served mainly as outlets for government propaganda.

While Houphouët-Boigny's regime was authoritarian, it was much milder than had already become the norm for African regimes of the time. Once he had consolidated his power, he freed political prisoners in 1967. Under his "unique brand of paternalistic authoritarianism", Houphouët-Boigny subdued dissent by offering government positions instead of incarceration to his critics. As a result, according to Robert Mundt, author of Côte d'Ivoire: Continuity and Change in a Semi-Democracy, he was never seriously challenged after 1963. While Houphouët-Boigny's Ivory Coast lacked political democracy in the Western sense, it was somewhat more tolerant and open than became the case in post-colonial Africa.

In order to foil any plans for a coup d'état, the president took control of the military and police, reducing their numbers from 5,300 to 3,500. Defence was entrusted to the French armed forces that, pursuant to the treaty on defence cooperation of 24 April 1961, were stationed at Port-Bouët and could intervene at Houphouët-Boigny's request or when they considered French interests to be threatened. They subsequently intervened during attempts by the Sanwi monarchists to secede in 1959 and 1969, and again in 1970, when an unauthorised political group, the Eburnian Movement, was formed and Houphouët-Boigny accused its leader Kragbé Gnagbé of wishing to secede.

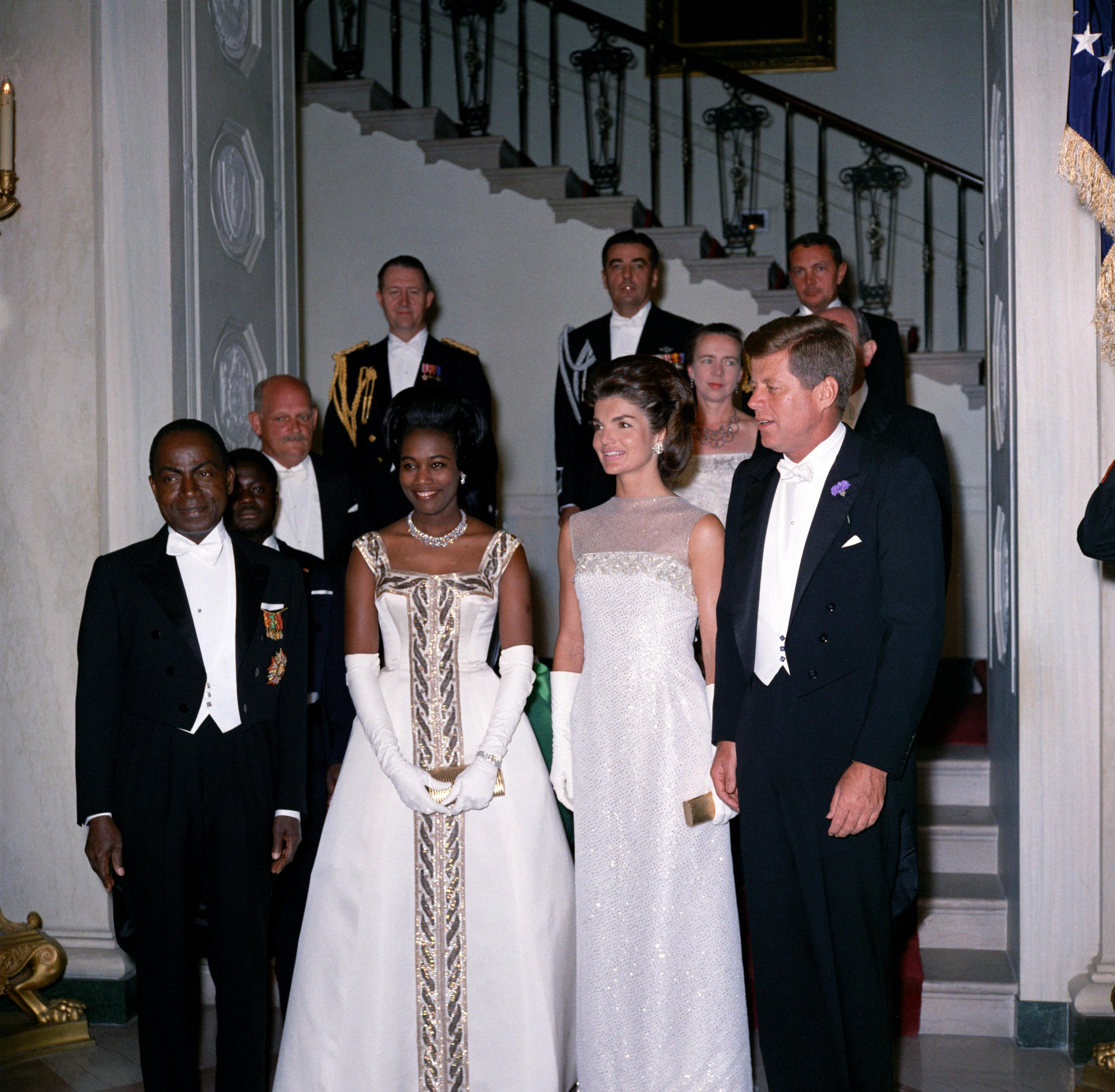
Félix Houphouët-Boigny and his wife Marie-Thérèse Houphouët-Boigny with John F. Kennedy and Jackie Kennedy in 1962

Houphouët-Boigny married the much younger Marie-Thérèse Brou in 1952, having also divorced his first wife of twenty-two years earlier in 1952. The couple had no children of their own, but adopted Abla Pokou, daughter of Akissi Anougble and granddaughter of the Bouale king Nanan Kouakou Anougble II, as Hélène Houphouët-Boigny in 1960.

The marriage was not without scandal. In 1958, Marie-Thérèse went on a romantic escapade in Italy, while in 1961, Houphouët-Boigny fathered a child Florence (d. 2007) out of wedlock by his mistress Henriette Duvignac.

=== Leadership in Africa ===
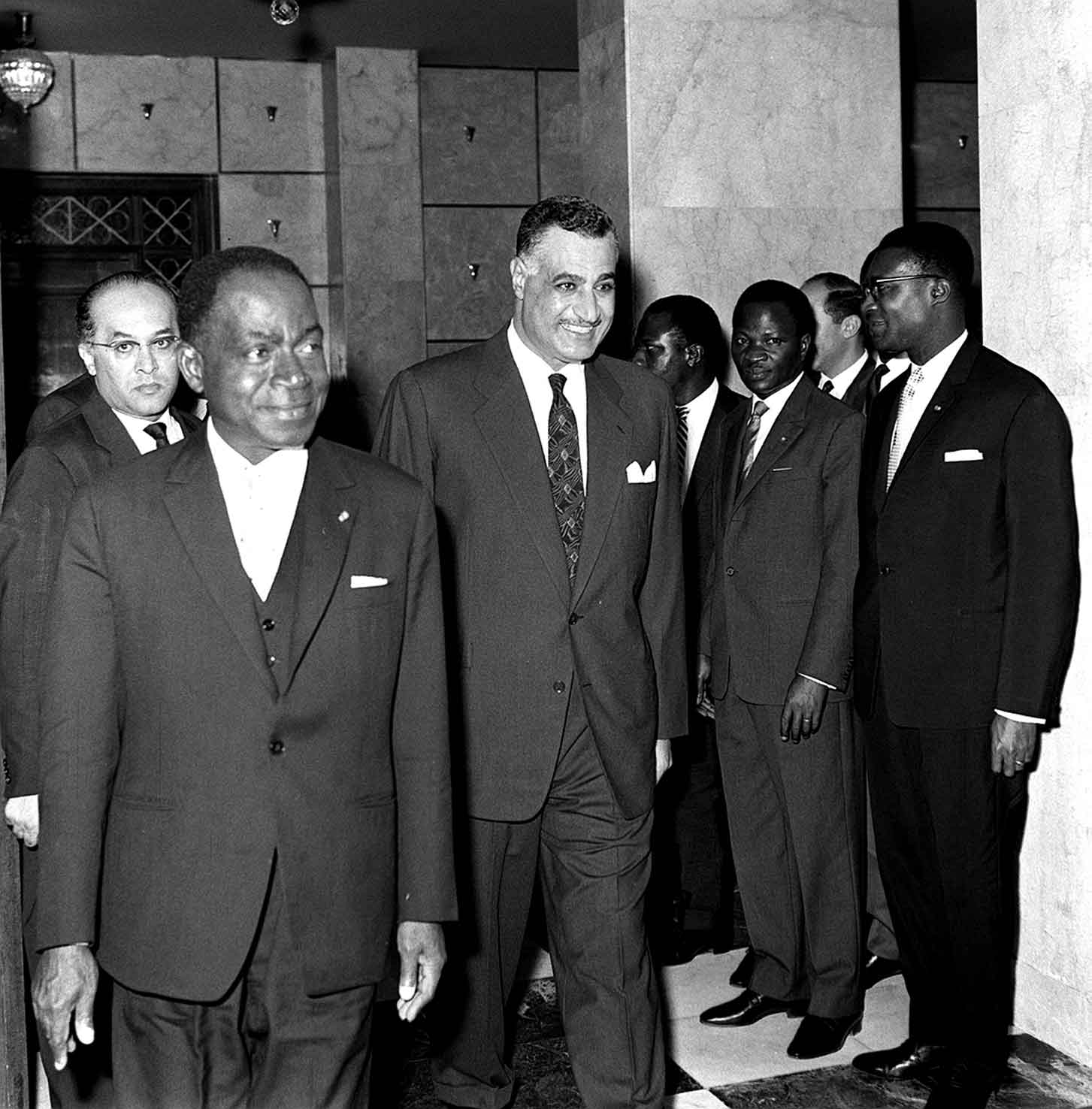
Boigny with President of Egypt Gamal Abdel Nasser (1963)

Following the example of de Gaulle, who refused proposals for an integrated Europe, Houphouët-Boigny opposed Nkrumah's proposed United States of Africa, which called into question Ivory Coast's recently acquired national sovereignty. However, Houphouët-Boigny was not opposed to collective African institutions if they were subject to his influence or control.

On 29 May 1959, in cooperation with Hamani Diori (Niger), Maurice Yaméogo (Upper Volta) and Hubert Maga (Dahomey), Houphouët-Boigny created the Conseil de l'Entente (Council of Accord or Council of Understanding). This regional organisation, founded in order to hamper the Mali Federation, was designed with three major functions: to allow shared management of certain public services, such as the port of Abidjan or the Abidjan–Niger railway line; to provide a solidarity fund accessible to member countries, 90% of which was provided by Ivory Coast; and to provide funding for various development projects through low-interest loans to member states (70% of the loans were supplied by Côte d'Ivoire). In 1966, Houphouët-Boigny even offered to grant dual citizenship to nationals from member countries of the Conseil de l'Entente, but the proposition was quickly abandoned following popular protests.

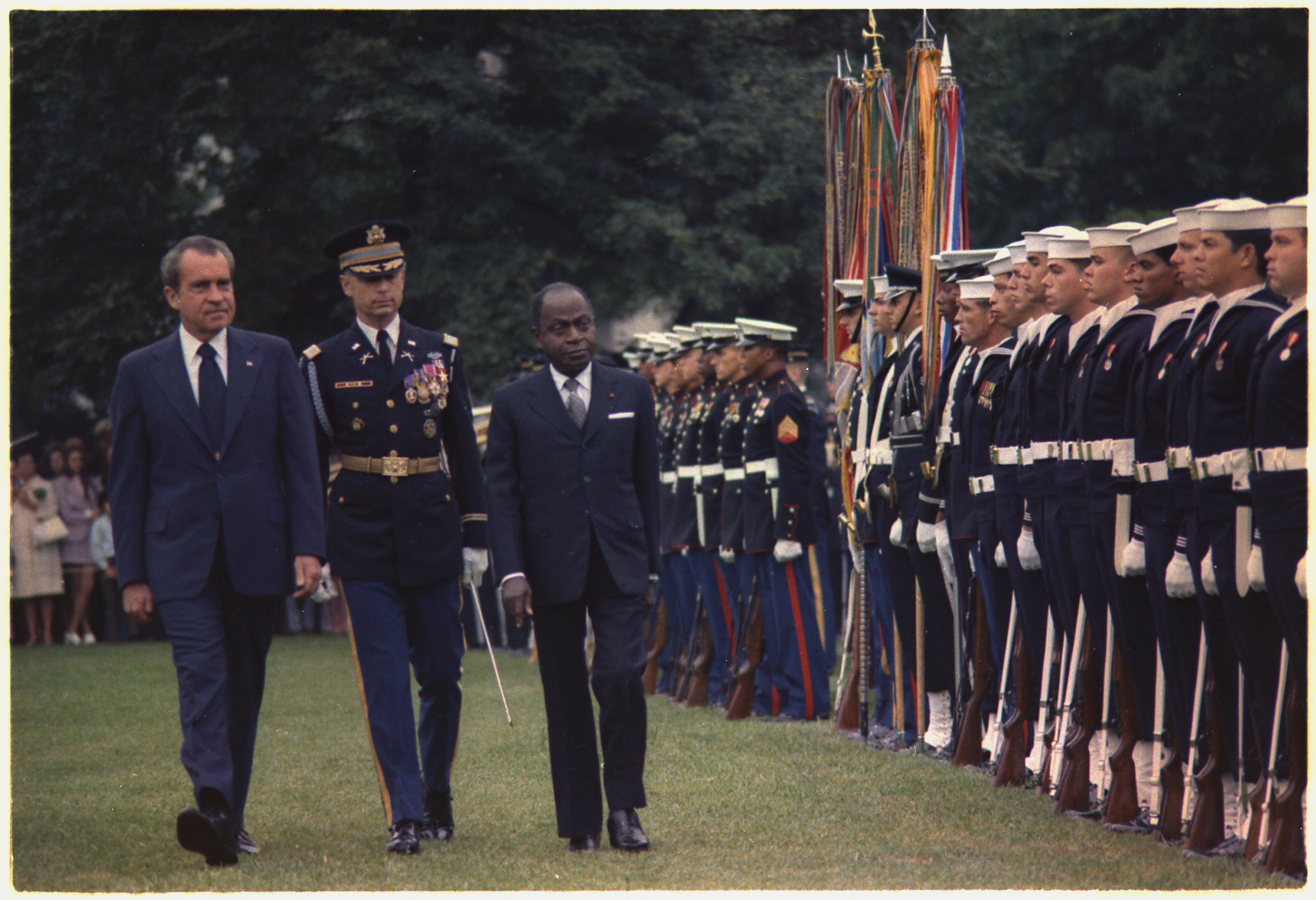
Boigny with Richard Nixon in 1973

The ambitious Ivorian leader had even greater plans for French-speaking Africa: he intended to rally the different nations behind a large organisation whose objective was the mutual assistance of its member states. The project became a reality on 7 September 1961 with the signing of a charter giving birth to the Union africaine et malgache (UAM; African and Malagasy Union), comprising 12 French-speaking countries including Léopold Sédar Senghor's Senegal. Agreements were signed in various sectors, such as economic, military and telecommunications, which strengthened solidarity among Francophone states. However, the creation of the Organisation of African Unity (OAU) in May 1963 affected his plans: the supporters of Pan-Africanism demanded the dissolution of all regional groupings, such as the UAM. Houphouët-Boigny reluctantly ceded, and transformed the UAM into the Organisation africaine et malgache de coopération économique et culturelle (African and Malagasy Organization of economic and cultural cooperation).

Considering the OAU a dead end organisation, particularly since Paris was opposed to the group, Houphouët-Boigny decided to create in 1965 l'Organisation commune africaine et malgache (OCAM; African and Malagasy Organization), a French organization in competition with the OAU. The organisation included among its members 16 countries, whose aim was to break revolutionary ambitions in Africa. However, over the years, the organisation became too subservient to France, resulting in the departure of half of the countries.

In the mid-1970s, during times of economic prosperity, Houphouët-Boigny and Senghor put aside their differences and joined forces to thwart Nigeria, which, in an attempt to establish itself in West Africa, had created the Economic Community of West African States (ECOWAS). The two countered the ECOWAS by creating the Economic Community of West Africa (ECWA), which superseded the old trade partnerships in the French-speaking regions. However, after assurances from Nigeria that ECOWAS would function in the same manner as the earlier Francophone organisations, Houphouët-Boigny and Senghor decided to merge their organization into ECOWAS in May 1975.

=== Françafrique ===
Throughout his presidency, Houphouët-Boigny surrounded himself with French advisers, such as Guy Nairay, chief of staff from 1960 to 1993, and Alain Belkiri, Secretary-General of the Ivorian government, whose influence extended to all areas. This type of diplomacy, which he labelled "Françafrique", allowed him to maintain very close ties with the former colonial power, making Ivory Coast France's primary African ally. Whenever one country would enter an agreement with an African nation, the other would unconditionally give its support. Through this arrangement, Houphouët-Boigny built a close friendship with Jacques Foccart, the chief adviser on African policy in the de Gaulle and Pompidou governments.

==== Destabilization of revolutionary regimes ====
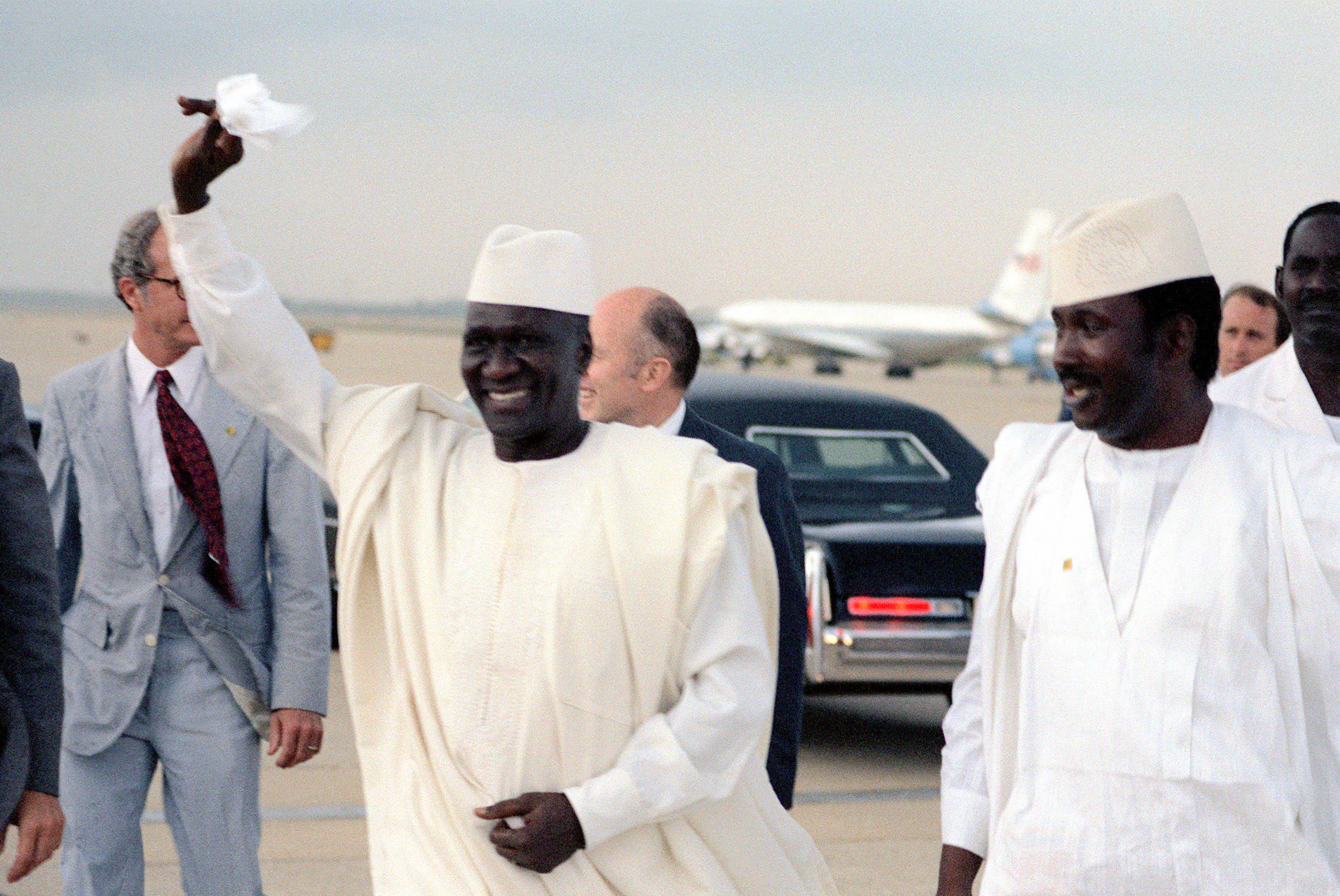
Ahmed Sékou Touré, the President of Guinea (1958–1984)

By claiming independence for Guinea through the 28 September 1958 French constitutional referendum, Ahmed Sékou Touré had not only defied de Gaulle, but also his fellow African, Houphouët-Boigny. He distanced himself from Guinean officials in Conakry and the Guinean Democratic Party was excluded from the RDA. Tensions between Houphouët-Boigny and Touré also began to rise due to the conspiracies of the French intelligence agency SDECE against the Sékou Touré regime. In January 1960, Houphouët-Boigny delivered small arms to former rebels in Man, Ivory Coast and incited his council in 1965 to agree to taking part in an attempt to overthrow Sékou Touré. In 1967, he promoted the creation of the Front national de libération de la Guinée (FNLG; National Front for the Liberation of Guinea), a reserve of men ready to plot the downfall of Sékou Touré.

Houphouët-Boigny's relationship with Kwame Nkrumah, the leader of neighboring Ghana, degraded considerably following Guinea's independence, due to Nkrumah's financial and political support for Sékou Touré. After Sékou Touré convinced Nkrumah to support the secessionist Sanwi in Ivory Coast, Houphouët-Boigny began a campaign to discredit the Ghanaian regime. He accused Nkrumah of trying to destabilise Ivory Coast in 1963, and called for the Francophone states to boycott the Organisation of African Unity (OAU) conference scheduled to take place in Accra. Nkrumah was ousted from power in 1966 in a military coup; Houphouët-Boigny allowed the conspirators to use Ivory Coast as a base to coordinate the arrival and departure of their missions.

Also in collaboration with Foccart, Houphouët-Boigny took part in the attempted coup of 16 January 1977 led by famed French mercenary Bob Denard against the revolutionary regime of Mathieu Kérékou in Dahomey. Houphouët-Boigny, to fight against the Marxists in power in Angola, also lent his support to Jonas Savimbi's UNITA party, whose feud with the MPLA party led to the Angolan Civil War.

Despite his reputation as a destabiliser of regimes, Houphouët-Boigny granted refuge to Jean-Bédel Bokassa, after the exiled Central African Republic dictator had been overthrown by French paratroopers in September 1979. This move was met with international criticism, and thus, having become a political and financial burden to Houphouët-Boigny, Bokassa was expelled from Côte d'Ivoire in 1983.

==== Alignment with France ====
Houphouët-Boigny was a participant in the November 1960 Congo Crisis, a period of political upheaval and conflict in Congo-Kinshasa. The Ivorian leader supported President Joseph Kasa-Vubu, an opponent of Lumumba, and followed France in supporting the controversial Congolese Prime Minister Moise Tshombe. Tshombe, disliked by much of Africa, was passionately defended by Houphouët-Boigny and was even invited into OCAM in May 1965. After the overthrow of Kasa-Vubu by General Mobutu in November 1965, the Ivorian president supported, in 1967, a plan proposed by the French secret service which aimed to bring the deposed Congolese leader back into power. The operation was a failure. In response, Houphouët-Boigny decided to boycott the fourth annual summit of the OAU held in September 1967 in Kinshasa.

Houphouët-Boigny was also a major contributor to the political tensions in Biafra. Considering Nigeria a potential danger to French-influenced African states, Foccart sent Houphouët-Boigny and Lieutenant-Colonel Raymond Bichelot on a mission in 1963 to monitor political developments in the country. The opportunity to weaken the former British colony presented itself in May 1967, when Biafra, led by Lieutenant-Colonel Chukwuemeka Odumegwu Ojukwu, undertook to secede from Nigeria. French-aligned African countries supported the secessionists who, provided with mercenaries and weapons by Jean Mauricheau-Beaupré, fought a civil war with the Nigerian government. By the end of the 1960s, French-supported nations suddenly and openly distanced themselves from France and Ivory Coast's position on the civil war.

At the request of Paris, Houphouet-Boigny began forging relations with South Africa in October 1970, justifying his attitude by stating that "[t]he problems of racial discrimination, so painful, so distressing, so revolting to our dignity of Negros, must not be resolved, we believe, by force." He even proposed to the OAU in June 1971 that they follow his lead. In spite of receiving some support, his proposal was rejected. This refusal did not, however, prevent him from continuing his attempts to approach the Pretoria regime. His attempts bore fruit in October of that year, when a semi-official meeting between a delegation of high level Ivorian officials and South African prime minister B. J. Vorster was held in the capital of South Africa. Moreover, mindful of the Communist influence in Africa, he met Vorster in Geneva in 1977, after the Soviet Union and Cuba tried to collectively spread their influence in Angola and Ethiopia. Relations with South Africa continued on an official basis until the end of his presidency.

Houphouët-Boigny and Thomas Sankara, the leader of Burkina Faso, had a highly turbulent relationship. Tensions reached their climax in 1985 when Ivory Coast Burkinabés accused authorities of being involved in a conspiracy to forcibly recruit young students to training camps in Libya. Houphouët-Boigny responded by inviting the dissident Jean-Claude Kamboulé to take refuge in Côte d'Ivoire so that he could organise opposition to the Sankara regime. In 1987, Sankara was overthrown and assassinated in a coup. The coup may have had French involvement, since the Sankara regime had fallen into disfavour in France. Houphouët-Boigny was also suspected of involvement in the coup and in November, the PDCI asked the government to ban the sale of Jeune Afrique following its allegations of Houphouët-Boigny's participation. The Ivorian president would have greatly benefited from the divisions in the Burkina Faso government. He contacted Blaise Compaoré, the second-most powerful man in the regime; it is generally believed that they worked in conjunction with Laurent Dona Fologo, Robert Guéï and Pierre Ouédraogo to overthrow the Sankara regime.

Besides supporting policies pursued by France, Houphouët-Boigny also influenced their actions in Africa. He pushed France to support and provide arms to warlord Charles Taylor's rebels during the First Liberian Civil War in hopes of receiving some of the country's assets and resources after the war.

He secretly participated in the trafficking of arms to the South African segregationist regime at the time when it was engaged in a conflict in Angola.

=== Opposition to the Soviet Union and China ===
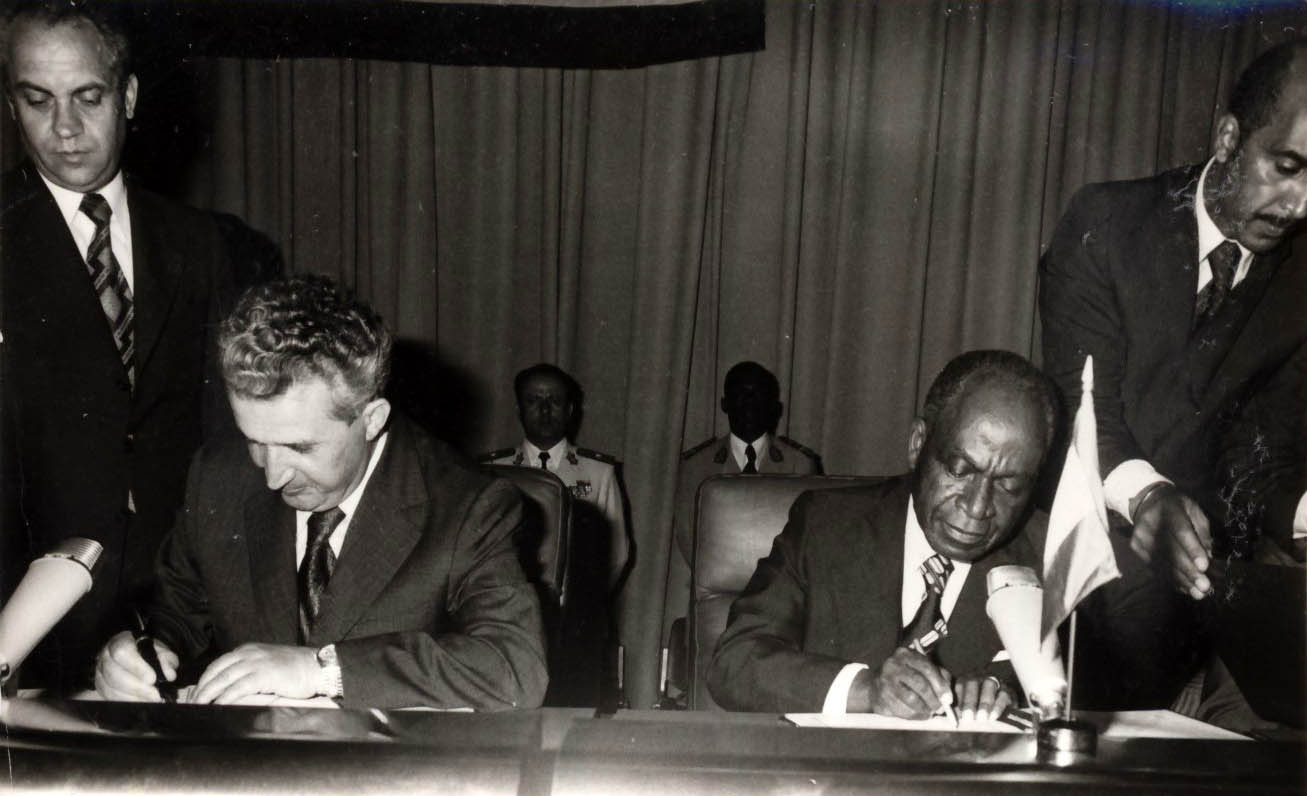
Boigny with Nicolae Ceauşescu in 1977

From the time of Ivory Coast's independence, Houphouët-Boigny considered the Soviet Union and China "malevolent" influences on developing countries. He did not establish diplomatic relations with Moscow until 1967 and then severed them in 1969 following allegations of direct Soviet support to a 1968 student protest at the National University of Côte d'Ivoire. The two countries did not restore ties until February 1986, by which time Houphouët-Boigny had embraced a more active foreign policy reflecting his quest for greater international recognition.

Houphouët-Boigny was even more outspoken in his criticism of the People's Republic of China (PRC). He voiced fears of an "invasion" by the Chinese and a subsequent colonisation of Africa. He was especially concerned that Africans would see the problems of development in China as analogous to those of Africa, and see China's solutions as appropriate to sub-Saharan Africa. Accordingly, Ivory Coast was one of the last countries to normalise relations with China, doing so on 3 March 1983. Under the principle demanded by Beijing for "one China", the recognition by Côte d'Ivoire of the PRC effectively disestablished diplomatic relations between Abidjan and Taiwan.

=== Economic policies in the 1960s and 1970s ===
Houphouët-Boigny adopted a system of economic liberalism in Ivory Coast to obtain the trust and confidence of foreign investors, most notably the French. The advantages granted by the investment laws he established in 1959 allowed foreign business to repatriate up to 90% of their profits in their country of origin (the remaining 10% was reinvested in Côte d'Ivoire). He also developed an agenda for modernising the country's infrastructure, for example, building an American-style business district in Abidjan where five-star hotels and resorts welcomed tourists and businessmen. Ivory Coast experienced economic growth of 11–12% from 1960 to 1965. The country's gross domestic product (GDP) grew twelvefold between 1960 and 1978, from 145 to 1,750 billion CFA francs, while the trade balance continued to record a surplus.

The origin of this economic success stemmed from the president's decision to focus on the primary sector of the economy, rather than the secondary sector. As a result, the agricultural sector experienced significant development: between 1960 and 1970, cocoa cultivators tripled their production to 312,000 tonnes and coffee production rose by nearly 50%, from 185,500 to 275,000 tonnes. As a result of this economic prosperity, Ivory Coast saw an influx of immigrants from other West African countries; the foreign workforce—mostly Burkinabés—who maintained indigenous plantations, represented over a quarter of the Ivorian population by 1980. Both Ivorians and foreigners began referring to Houphouët-Boigny as the "Sage of Africa" for performing what became known as "Ivorian miracle". He was also respectfully nicknamed "The Old One" (Le Vieux).

However, the economic system developed in cooperation with France was far from perfect. As Houphouët-Boigny described it, the economy of Ivory Coast experienced "growth without development". The growth of the economy depended on capital, initiatives and a financial framework from investors abroad; it had not become independent or self-sustaining.

=== Crisis in Ivory Coast ===
==== Economy on the brink of collapse ====
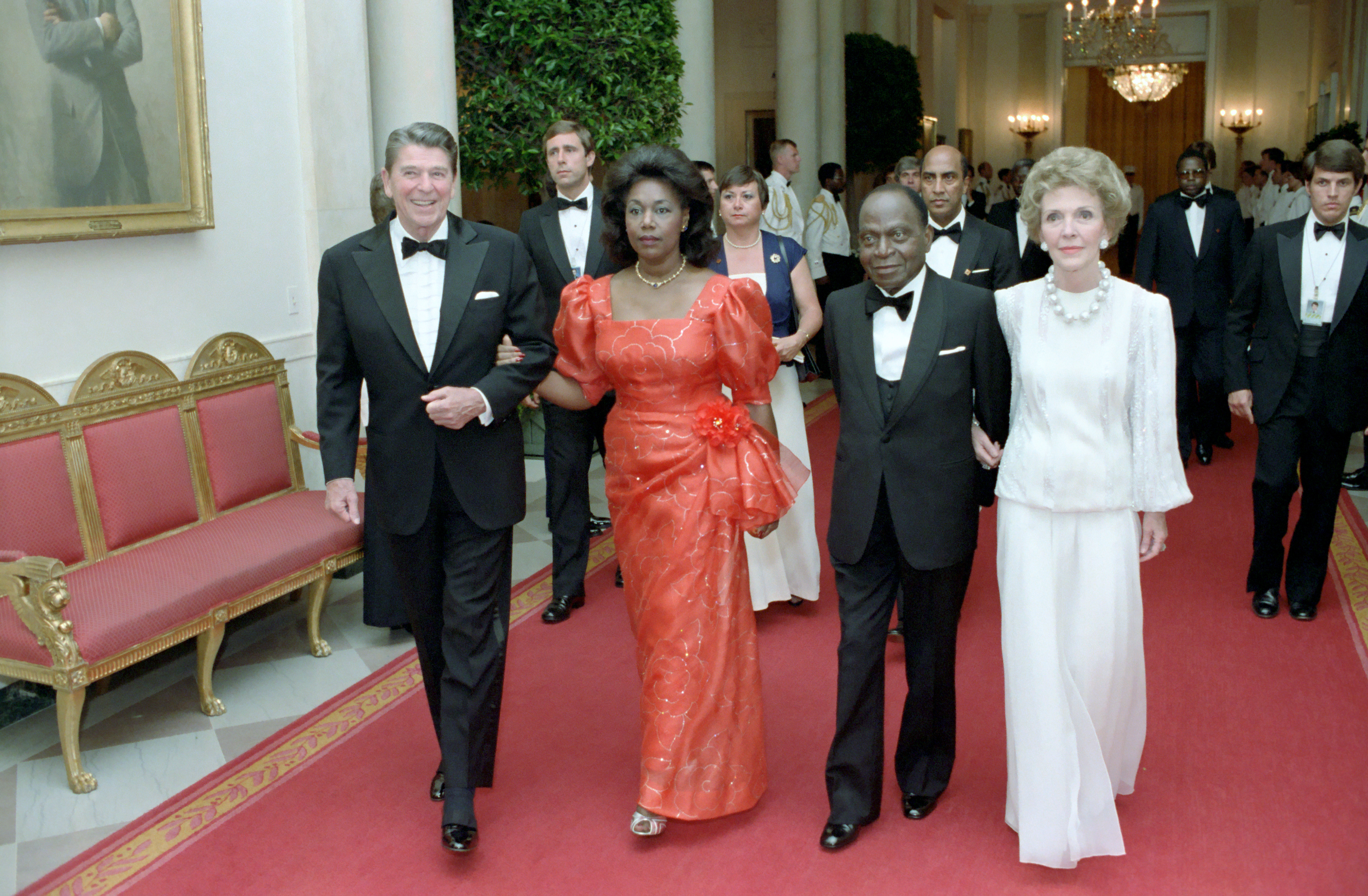
Ronald and Nancy Reagan with Mr. and Mrs, Boigny in 1983

Beginning in 1978, the economy of Ivory Coast experienced a serious decline due to the sharp downturn in international market prices of coffee and cocoa. The decline was perceived as fleeting, since its impact on planters was buffered by the Caistab, the agricultural marketing board, which ensured them a livable income. The next year, in order to contain a sudden drop in the prices of exported goods, Houphouët-Boigny raised prices to resist international tariffs on raw materials. However, by applying only this solution, Ivory Coast lost more than 700 billion CFA francs between 1980 and 1982. From 1983 to 1984, Côte d'Ivoire fell victim to a drought that ravaged nearly 400,000 hectares of forest and 250,000 hectares of coffee and cocoa plants. To address this problem, Houphouët-Boigny travelled to London to negotiate an agreement on coffee and cocoa prices with traders and industrialists; by 1984, the agreement had fallen apart and Ivory Coast was engulfed in a major financial crisis.

Even the production of the offshore oil drilling and petrochemical industries, developed to supply the Caistab, was affected by the 1986 worldwide economic recession. Ivory Coast, which had bought planters' harvests for double the market price, fell into heavy debt. By May 1987, the foreign debt had reached US$10 billion, prompting Houphouët-Boigny to suspend payments of the debt. Refusing to sell off its supply of cocoa, the country shut down its exports in July and forced world rates to increase. However, this "embargo" failed. In November 1989, Houphouët-Boigny liquidated his enormous stock of cocoa to big businesses to jump-start the economy. Gravely ill at this time, he named a prime minister (the post was unoccupied since 1960), Alassane Ouattara, who established a series of belt-tightening economic measures to bring the country out of debt.

==== Social tensions ====
The general atmosphere of enrichment and satisfaction during the period of economic growth in Ivory Coast made it possible for Houphouët-Boigny to maintain and control internal political tensions. His easygoing authoritarian regime, where political prisoners were almost nonexistent, was well accepted by the population. However, the economic crisis that began in the 1980s caused a sharp decline in living conditions for the middle class and underprivileged urban populations. According to the World Bank, the population living below the poverty threshold went from 11% in 1985 to 31% by 1993. Despite the implementation of certain measures, such as the reduction of the number of young French workers (who worked abroad while serving in the military) from 3,000 to 2,000 in 1986, allowing many jobs to go to young Ivorian graduates, the government failed to control the rising rates of unemployment and bankruptcy in many companies.

Strong social agitations shook the country, creating insecurity. The army mutinied in 1990 and 1992, and on 2 March 1990, protesters organized mass demonstrations in the streets of Abidjan with slogans such as "thief Houphouët" and "corrupt Houphouët". These popular demonstrations prompted the president to launch a system of democratization on 31 May, in which he authorised political pluralism and trade unions.

===== Opposition =====
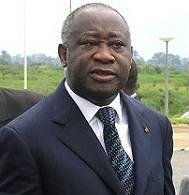
Gbagbo, as President of Ivory Coast, in 2007

Laurent Gbagbo gained recognition as one of the principal instigators of the student demonstrations during the protests against Houphouët-Boigny's government on 9 February 1982, which led to the closing of the universities and other educational institutions. Shortly thereafter, his wife and he formed what would become the Ivorian Popular Front (FPI). Gbagbo went into exile in France later that year, where he promoted the FPI and its political platforms. Although the FPI was ideologically similar to the Unified Socialist Party, the French socialist government tried to ignore Gbagbo's party to please Houphouët-Boigny. After a lengthy appeal process, Gbagbo obtained status as a political refugee in France in 1985. However, the French government attempted to pressure him into returning to Ivory Coast, as Houphouët-Boigny had begun to worry about Gbagbo's developing a network of contacts, and believed "his stirring opponent would be less of a threat in Abidjan than in Paris".

In 1988, Gbagbo returned from exile to Ivory Coast after Houphouët-Boigny implicitly granted him forgiveness by declaring that "the tree did not get angry at the bird". In 1990, Houphouët-Boigny legalised opposition parties. On 28 October a presidential election was held. Gbagbo filed to run against Houphouët-Boigny, resulting in the country's first contested election. Gbagbo highlighted the President's age, suggesting that the 85-year-old president would not survive a seventh five-year term. Houphouët-Boigny countered by broadcasting television footage of his youth. According to official figures, he defeated Gbagbo with 2,445,365 votes to 548,441—an implausible 81.7 percent of the vote.

==== Displays of wealth ====
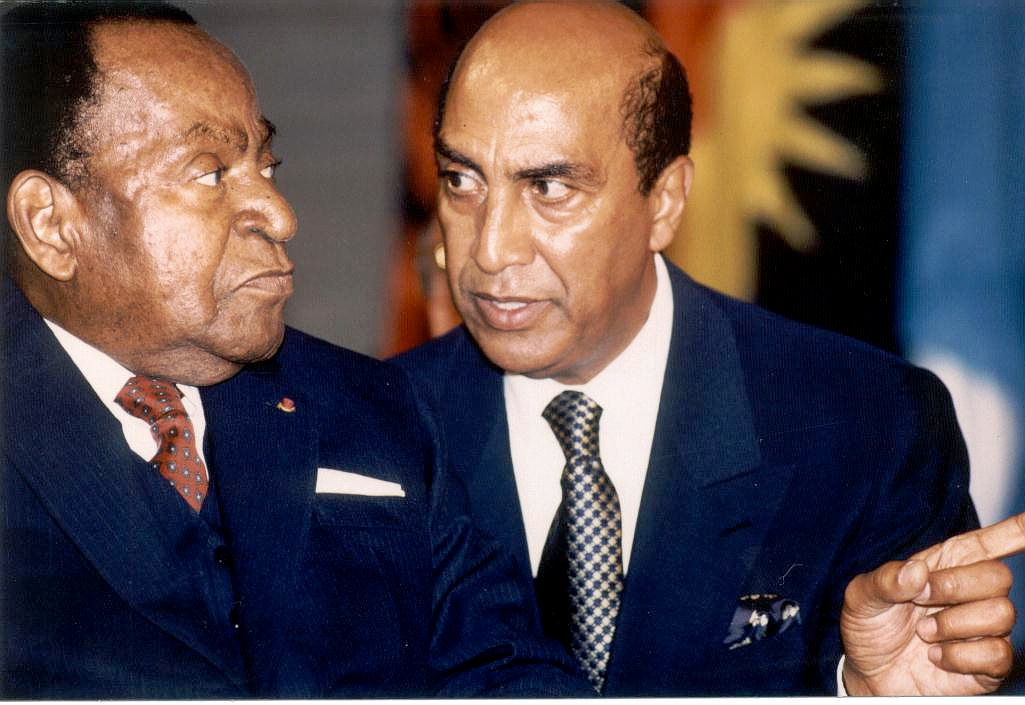
Boigny in 1990

During his presidency, Houphouët-Boigny benefited greatly from the wealth of Ivory Coast; by the time of his death in 1993, his personal wealth was estimated to be between US$7 and $11 billion. With regards to his large fortune, Houphouët-Boigny said in 1983, "People are surprised that I like gold. It's just that I was born in it." The Ivorian leader acquired a dozen properties in the metropolitan area of Paris (including Hotel Masseran on Masseran Street in the 7th arrondissement of Paris), a property in Castel Gandolfo in Italy, and a house in Chêne-Bourg, Switzerland. He owned real estate companies, such as Grand Air SI, SI Picallpoc and Interfalco, and had many shares in prestigious jewelry and watchmaking companies, such as Piaget SA and Harry Winston. He placed his fortune in Switzerland, once asking if "there is any serious man on Earth not stocking parts of his fortune in Switzerland".

In 1983, Houphouët-Boigny moved the capital from Abidjan to Yamoussoukro. There, at the expense of the state, he built many buildings such as the Institute Polytechnique and an international airport. The most luxurious project was the Basilica of Our Lady of Peace, which is currently the largest church in the world, with an area of 30,000 square metres (320,000 sq ft) and a height of 158 metres (518 ft). Personally financed by Houphouët-Boigny, construction for the Basilica of Our Lady of Peace was carried out by the Lebanese architect Pierre Fakhoury at a total cost of about US$150–200 million. Houphouët-Boigny offered it to Pope John Paul II as a "personal gift"; the latter, after having unsuccessfully requested it being shorter than St. Peter's in Rome, consecrated it all the same on 10 September 1990. Due to a collapse of the national economy coupled with lavish amounts spent on its construction, the Basilica was criticized: it was called "the basilica in the bush" by several western news agencies.

== Death and legacy ==
=== Succession and death ===
The political, social, and economic crises also touched the issue of who would succeed Houphouët-Boigny as head of state. After severing ties with his former political heir Philippe Yacé in 1980, who, as president of the National Assembly, was entitled to exercise the full functions of president of the republic if the head of state was incapacitated or absent, Houphouët-Boigny delayed as much as he could in officially designating a successor. The president's health became increasingly fragile, with Prime Minister Alassane Ouattara administering the country from 1990 onwards, while the president was hospitalised in France. There was a struggle for power, which ended when Houphouët-Boigny rejected Ouattara in favour of Henri Konan Bédié, the president of the National Assembly. In December 1993, Houphouët-Boigny, terminally ill with prostate cancer, was urgently flown back to Côte d'Ivoire so he could die there. He was kept on life support to ensure that the last dispositions concerning his succession were defined. After his family consented, Houphouët-Boigny was disconnected from life support at 6:35 am GMT on 7 December. At the time of his death, Houphouët-Boigny was the longest-serving leader in Africa and the third in the world, after Fidel Castro of Cuba and Kim Il Sung of North Korea.

=== Funeral ===
His peaceful fight for peace among men and women will be continued by all Ivorians, steadfastly true to the memory of the person who was for us, at one and the same time, the first President of our Republic, the father of our independence, the builder of our State, and the symbol and bond of our national unity. He sowed the seeds of peace, braving all the dangers. Deep in his heart, he cherished the constant hope to see the harvests gathered in, so that men and women might come to persevere with the solidarity required of them, like so many ears of corn reaped in fields of harmony.

— Henri Konan Bédié, President of Côte d'Ivoire

Following Houphouët-Boigny's death, the country's stability was maintained, as seen by his funeral on 7 February 1994. The funeral for this "doyen of francophone Africa" was held in the Basilica of Our Lady of Peace, with 7,000 guests inside the building and tens of thousands outside. The two-month delay before Houphouët-Boigny's funeral, common among members of the Baoule ethnic group, allowed for many ceremonies preceding his burial. The president's funeral featured many traditional African funerary customs, including a large chorus dressed in bright batik dresses singing "laagoh budji gnia" (Baoulé: "Lord, it is you who has made all things") and village chiefs displaying strips of kente and korhogo cloth. Baoulés are traditionally buried with objects they enjoyed while alive; Houphouët-Boigny's family, however, did not state what, if anything, they would bury with him.

Over 140 countries and international organisations sent delegates to the funeral. However, according to The New York Times, many Ivorians were disappointed by the poor attendance of several key allies, most notably the United States. The small United States delegation was led by Secretary of Energy Hazel R. O'Leary and Assistant Secretary of State for African Affairs George Moose. In contrast, Houphouët-Boigny's close personal ties with France were reflected in the large French delegation, which included President François Mitterrand; Prime Minister Édouard Balladur; the presidents of the National Assembly and of the Senate, Philippe Séguin and René Monory; former president Valéry Giscard d'Estaing; Jacques Chirac; his friend Jacques Foccart; and six former prime ministers. According to The New York Times, "Houphouët-Boigny's death is not only the end of a political era here, but perhaps as well the end of the close French-African relationship that he came to symbolize."

=== Félix Houphouët-Boigny Peace Prize ===
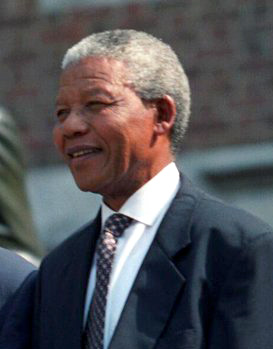
South African leader Nelson Mandela, the 1991 recipient of the Félix Houphouët-Boigny Peace Prize.

To establish his legacy as a man of peace, Houphouët-Boigny created an award in 1989, sponsored by UNESCO and funded entirely by extra-budgetary resources provided by the Félix-Houphouët-Boigny Foundation, to honor those who search for peace. The prize is "named after President Félix Houphouët-Boigny, the doyen of African Heads of State and a tireless advocate of peace, concord, fellowship and dialogue to solve all conflicts both within and between States". It is awarded annually along with a check for €122,000, by an international jury composed of 11 persons from five continents, formerly led by former United States secretary of state and Nobel Peace Prize winner Henry Kissinger. The prize was first awarded in 1991 to Nelson Mandela, president of the African National Congress, and Frederik Willem de Klerk, president of the Republic of South Africa, and has been awarded each year since, with the exception of 2001 and 2004.

=== Ivory Coast after Houphouët-Boigny ===
Houphouët-Boigny left no written will or legacy report for the Ivory Coast upon his death in 1993. His recognised heirs, especially Helena, led a battle against the government to recover part of the vast fortune Houphouët-Boigny had left, which she claimed was "private" and did not belong to the State.

Houphouët-Boigny's lack of a succession plan led to a crisis between his deputy Henri Konan Bédié, President of the Parliament, and Prime Minister Alassane Ouattara. Bédié was initially successful and Ouattara resigned as Prime Minister on 9 December. Bédié was subsequently elected as President of the PDCI in April 1994.

== Notes ==
Political offices
Preceded by vacant	French Minister of Health; 1957–1958	Succeeded by André Maroselli
Preceded by Post established	Prime Minister of Ivory Coast; 1960	Succeeded by Himself as President
Preceded by Himself as Prime Minister	President of Ivory Coast; 1960–93	Succeeded by Henri Konan Bédié
Preceded by Party established	Democratic Party of Ivory Coast – African Democratic Rally; 1947–93	Succeeded by Henri Konan Bédié
