= French legislative elections, 1946 =

Legislative elections were held in France twice in 1946:

- June 1946 French legislative election
- November 1946 French legislative election
