= June 1946 French legislative election in Tunisia =

Elections to the French National Assembly were held in Tunisia on 2 June 1946 as part of the wider French elections. Two members were elected from the territory, with both seats won by the French Rally, which was linked with the Rally of Left Republicans. The seats were taken by Louis Brunet and Antoine Colonna, both of whom had previously been elected in the 1945 elections.

== Results ==
| Party | Votes | % | Seats | +/– |
|---|---|---|---|---|
| French Rally | 26,916 | 56.79 | 2 | 0 |
| French Section of the Workers' International | 8,702 | 18.36 | 0 | 0 |
| French Communist Party | 7,544 | 15.92 | 0 | 0 |
| Popular Republican Movement | 4,236 | 8.94 | 0 | New |
| Total | 47,398 | 100.00 | 2 | 0 |
| Valid votes | 47,398 | 99.08 | | |
| Invalid/blank votes | 440 | 0.92 | | |
| Total votes | 47,838 | 100.00 | | |
| Registered voters/turnout | 79,280 | 60.34 | | |
Source: Sternberger et al.
