= November 1946 French legislative election in French Somaliland =

Elections to the French National Assembly were held in French Somaliland on 10 November 1946 as part of the wider French parliamentary elections. Jean-Carles Martine was elected as the territory's MP, defeating the incumbent René Bernard-Cothier.

== Results ==
Candidate	Votes	%
Jean-Carles Martine	550	40.59
Félix-Francis Carn	439	32.40
René Bernard-Cothier	352	25.98
René Aden Goureh-Faye	14	1.03
Total	1,355	100.00
Valid votes	1,355	98.62
Invalid/blank votes	19	1.38
Total votes	1,374	100.00
Registered voters/turnout	1,825	75.29
Source: Sternberger et al.
