= Guillaume Houphouët-Boigny =

Ivorian banker (1937–2026)

- Born: 21 November 1937; Ivory Coast, French West Africa
- Died: 12 March 2026 (aged 88); Abidjan, Ivory Coast
- Occupation: Banker
- Parent: Félix Houphouët-Boigny (father)

Guillaume Houphouët-Boigny (21 November 1937 – 12 March 2026) was an Ivorian banker. He served as secretary-general of the Ivorian Bank Company during the administration of his father, President Félix Houphouët-Boigny.

Houphouët-Boigny died at the International Polyclinic of Sainte-Anne-Marie in Abidjan, on 12 March 2026, at the age of 88.
