= Jean-Baptiste Mockey =

Ivorian deputy prime minister

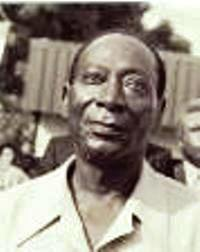
Jean-Baptiste Mockey

Jean-Baptiste Mockey (14 April 1915 – 29 January 1981) was an Ivorian politician. He was Deputy Prime Minister under Félix Houphouët-Boigny. Despite this, radical nationalists, led by Mockey, openly opposed the government's Francophile policies. To solve this problem, Houphouët-Boigny decided to get rid of Mockey by exiling him in September 1959, claiming that Mockey had attempted to assassinate him using maleficent fetishes in the "complot du chat noir" (black cat conspiracy).
