= November 1946 French legislative election in Gabon–Moyen Congo =

Elections to the French National Assembly were held in French Gabon and Moyen Congo as part of the wider French election on 10 November 1946.

== Electorate and constituencies ==
The electorate of French colonies in Africa was divided into two segments, one elected by common law citizens (the first college, i.e. French citizens) and one elected by citizens of professional stature (the second college, i.e. Africans who were 21 years and above, and qualified as a member of one of twelve specified categories; civil servants, notables, soldiers and veterans, heads of native collectivities, members of native courts, etc.). In the Gabon-Moyen-Congo constituency for a single first college seat, there were 4,148 registered voters, whilst the two second college seats had 26,530 registered voters in Gabon and 23,119 in Moyen Congo respectively.

In French West Africa the setting up of two separate electoral colleges had caused an uproar, there were generally few reactions from in French Equatorial Africa (AEF). The Congolese member of the National Assembly, Jean-Félix Tchicaya, was the sole voice from the AEF to condemn the separate electoral college system during the debates in the National Assembly in the run-up to the elections.

Electoral participation (amongst the second college) was 47.8% in Gabon and 67.7% in Moyen-Congo.

== Results ==
In the second college, Jean-Félix Tchicaya (the leader of the Congolese Progressive Party) was elected from Moyen-Congo and Jean-Hilaire Aubame was elected from Gabon. Aubame got 7,069 votes, out of 12,528 votes cast. Barthélemy Boganda of the Popular Republican Movement (MRP) was elected from Oubangui-Chari.

Maurice Bayrou was elected from the first college Gabon–Moyen Congo seat. He contested the election as an 'independent socialist', supported by the local French administration. His main rival was the SFIO candidate Henri Seignon. Bayrou got 55.1% (around 1195 votes) of the votes and Seignon 39% (846 votes). After the elections, Bayrou joined the Gaullist Rally of the French People.

=== First College ===
| Candidate | Party | Votes | % |
|---|---|---|---|
| Maurice Bayrou | Rally of the French People | 1,195 | 58.55 |
| Henri Seignon | French Section of the Workers' International | 846 | 41.45 |
| Total | | 2,041 | 100.00 |
| Valid votes | | 2,041 | 94.19 |
| Invalid/blank votes | | 126 | 5.81 |
| Total votes | | 2,167 | 100.00 |
| Registered voters/turnout | | 4,148 | 52.24 |
Source: Sternberger et al.

=== Second College: Gabon ===
| Candidate | Party | Votes | % |
|---|---|---|---|
| Jean-Hilaire Aubame | French Section of the Workers' International | 7,069 | 56.43 |
| Emile Issembe | | 4,930 | 39.35 |
| Jean Rémy Ayouné | Popular Republican Movement | 301 | 2.40 |
| Louis Bigmann | | 228 | 1.82 |
| Total | | 12,528 | 100.00 |
| Valid votes | | 12,528 | 98.75 |
| Invalid/blank votes | | 158 | 1.25 |
| Total votes | | 12,686 | 100.00 |
| Registered voters/turnout | | 26,530 | 47.82 |
Source: Sternberger et al.

=== Second College: Moyen Congo ===
| Candidate | Party | Votes | % |
|---|---|---|---|
| Félix Tchicaya | Congolese Progressive Party | 8,635 | 63.63 |
| Jacques Opangault | French Section of the Workers' International | 4,281 | 31.55 |
| Charles Gougaud-d'Outremey | Democratic and Socialist Union of the Resistance | 654 | 4.82 |
| Total | | 13,570 | 100.00 |
| Valid votes | | 13,570 | 86.70 |
| Invalid/blank votes | | 2,082 | 13.30 |
| Total votes | | 15,652 | 100.00 |
| Registered voters/turnout | | 23,119 | 67.70 |
Source: Sternberger et al.
