= 1945 French legislative election in Gabon–Moyen Congo =

Elections to the French National Assembly were held in French Gabon and French Congo on 21 October 1945, with a second round of voting on 18 November. Gabriel d'Arboussier and Jean-Félix Tchicaya were elected.

== Electoral system ==
The two seats allocated to the constituency were elected on two separate electoral rolls; French citizens elected one MP from the first college, whilst non-citizens elected one MP in the second college.

== Campaign ==
The election campaign was largely a contest between three large ethnic groups; the Fang of Gabon, the Mbochi in the north of Congo and the Vili from the Pointe-Noire coastal area. One other large group, the Kongo, refused to vote or wrote the name of the religious figure André Matsoua (who had died in prison in 1942) on the ballot paper.

The Fang candidate was Jean-Hilaire Aubame, whilst the Vili candidate was Jean-Félix Tchicaya.

== Results ==
=== First college ===
Candidate	Party	Votes	%
Gabriel d'Arboussier	Republican Resistance	817	50.81
Henri Seignon	French Section of the Workers' International	604	37.56
Jean Puytoroc	Popular Republican Movement	187	11.63
Total		1,608	100.00
Valid votes		1,608	81.09
Invalid/blank votes		375	18.91
Total votes		1,983	100.00
Registered voters/turnout		2,803	70.75
Source: Sternberger et al.

=== Second college ===
Candidate	First round		Second round	
Candidate	Votes	%	Votes	%
Jean-Hilaire Aubame	912	20.22	987	23.62
Jean-Félix Tchicaya	800	17.74	1,334	31.93
Emile Issembe	800	17.74	855	20.46
Jacques Opangault	633	14.04	956	22.88
Emmanuel Damongo-Dadet	588	13.04		
René Dzonza	209	4.63		
Aubert Lounda	179	3.97		
Jean Rigo	130	2.88		
Pierre Tchicaya	85	1.88		
Jean Boudet	72	1.60		
François-Moussa Simon	66	1.46	46	1.10
Louis Bigmann	36	0.80		
Total	4,510	100.00	4,178	100.00
Valid votes	4,510	96.59	4,178	96.80
Invalid/blank votes	159	3.41	138	3.20
Total votes	4,669	100.00	4,316	100.00
Registered voters/turnout	5,873	79.50	5,871	73.51
Source: Sternberger et al., Outre-mers

== Aftermath ==
Following the elections, Senegalese MP Lamine Guèye attempted to persuade all the African MPs to form an African Bloc, which would be affiliated with the SFIO. However, the attempt failed, and although Tchicaya did sit with the SFIO, d'Arboussier joined the MUR.
