= Jean Konan Banny =

Ivorian politician (1929 – 2018)

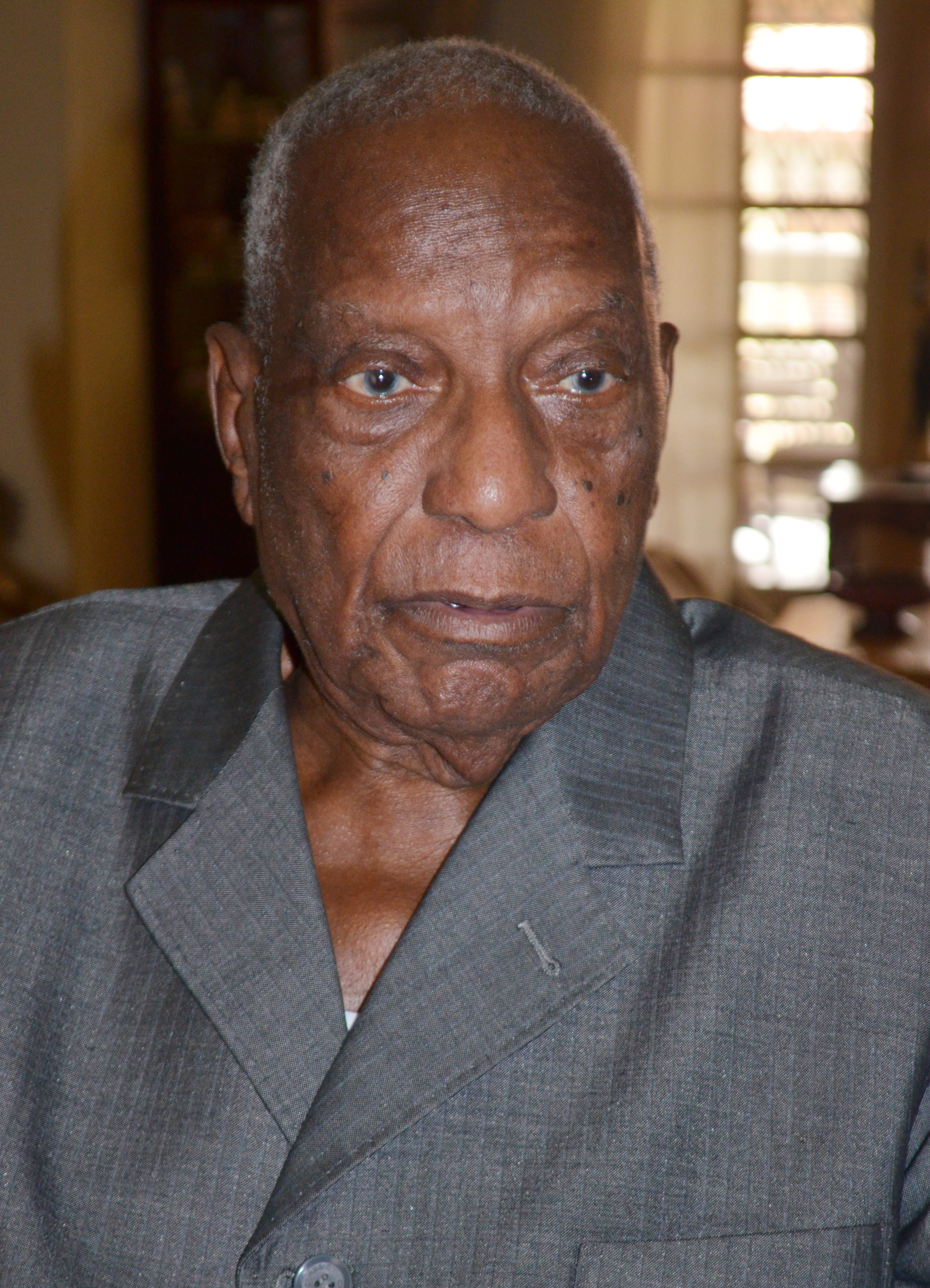

Minister of Defense
- In office 1960 – September 1963
- Preceded by: None (position first established)
- Succeeded by: Kouadio M'Bahia Blé

Personal details
- Born: July 14, 1929 Divo, Ivory Coast
- Died: May 27, 2018 (aged 88) Abidjan, Ivory Coast
- Party: Democratic Party of Côte d'Ivoire
- Occupation: Lawyer, Minister

Jean Konan Banny (July 14, 1929 – May 27, 2018) was an Ivorian politician of the Democratic Party of Côte d'Ivoire (PDCI). He is the brother of Charles Konan Banny, a former Prime Minister of Côte d'Ivoire.

== Biography ==
A lawyer, Banny served as Minister of Defense for Côte d'Ivoire from its independence in 1960 to 1963. In 1963, he was arrested, tried, and sentenced to death on charges of participating in President Félix Houphouët-Boigny's "complot du chat noir" (black cat conspiracy). Meanwhile, his office was transferred to Kouadio M'Bahia Blé whose ministership lasted more than 17 years. There was discontent in the army, as the generals stirred following his arrest and Houphouët-Boigny had to intervene personally to sedate the army.

Banny, who personally knew Houphouët-Boigny from childhood, was pardoned and released in 1967. He asked Banny to be the mayor of Yamoussoukro, though Houphouët-Boigny's successor, Henri Konan Bédié, appointed Banny as Resident Minister of the capital. The Resident Minister is a member of the Council of Elders of the PDCI, which includes roughly a hundred elders.

He also directed the Société fruitière du Bandama, an industrial company, which produces and exports fruit juice, mainly that of pineapples. The company created the popular drink Cristelor in 1983. Described as a delice d'ananas petillant, French for sparkling pineapple delight, it is popularly called pineapple champagne. Banny claimed the idea "came to [him when he thought] to make a wine from pineapples" and was named after his granddaughter Cristel. He also proposed an alcoholic version of the drink.

== Notes ==
Political offices
Preceded by Post established	Defence Minister of Côte d'Ivoire; 1959-1963	Succeeded by Kouadio M'Bahia Blé
