= June 1946 French legislative election in Mauritania–Senegal =

Elections to the French National Assembly were held in the constituency of Senegal-Mauritania on 2 June 1946 as part of the wider parliamentary elections. Two members were elected from the seat, with the winners being French Section of the Workers' International candidates Lamine Guèye and Léopold Sédar Senghor. Both were incumbent MPs, having won their seats in the 1945 elections.

== Results ==
=== First college ===
Candidate	Party	Votes	%
Lamine Guèye	French Section of the Workers' International	31,288	97.13
Adolphe Maillat	Independent Socialists	925	2.87
Total		32,213	100.00
Valid votes		32,213	98.35
Invalid/blank votes		540	1.65
Total votes		32,753	100.00
Registered voters/turnout		46,985	69.71
Source: Sternberger et al.

=== Second college ===
Candidate	Party	Votes	%
Léopold Sédar Senghor	French Section of the Workers' International	20,718	100.00
Total		20,718	100.00
Valid votes		20,718	97.35
Invalid/blank votes		563	2.65
Total votes		21,281	100.00
Registered voters/turnout		28,461	74.77
Source: Sternberger et al.
