= Auguste Denise =

Ivorian politician (1906–1990)

Marcel Auguste Denise (February 3, 1906 – 20 July 1990) was the head of state of Ivory Coast before its independence, after Ernest De Nattes, a colonial administrator who was stationed in Côte d'Ivoire. An Ivorian of West Indian origin (Martinique), he was the "President of the provisional government" of Côte d'Ivoire during the colonial and autonomous period.

After the referendum of 1958 organized in the French colonies of Africa during which the Ivory Coast voted for the “yesN 1” which granted former colonies the status of "republics within the French community”, Auguste Denise was appointed Prime Minister, with Jean-Baptiste Mockey as Minister of the Interior and Ernest Boka as Minister of Education. He was replaced in 1959 by Félix Houphouët-Boigny who, on this occasion, left his post as minister of the French government and was the first Ivoirian President of the National Assembly.

Auguste-Denise stadium in the city of San-Pédro, in the west of the country, is named in his honor.
