= 1946 Texas lieutenant gubernatorial election =

- November 5, 1946
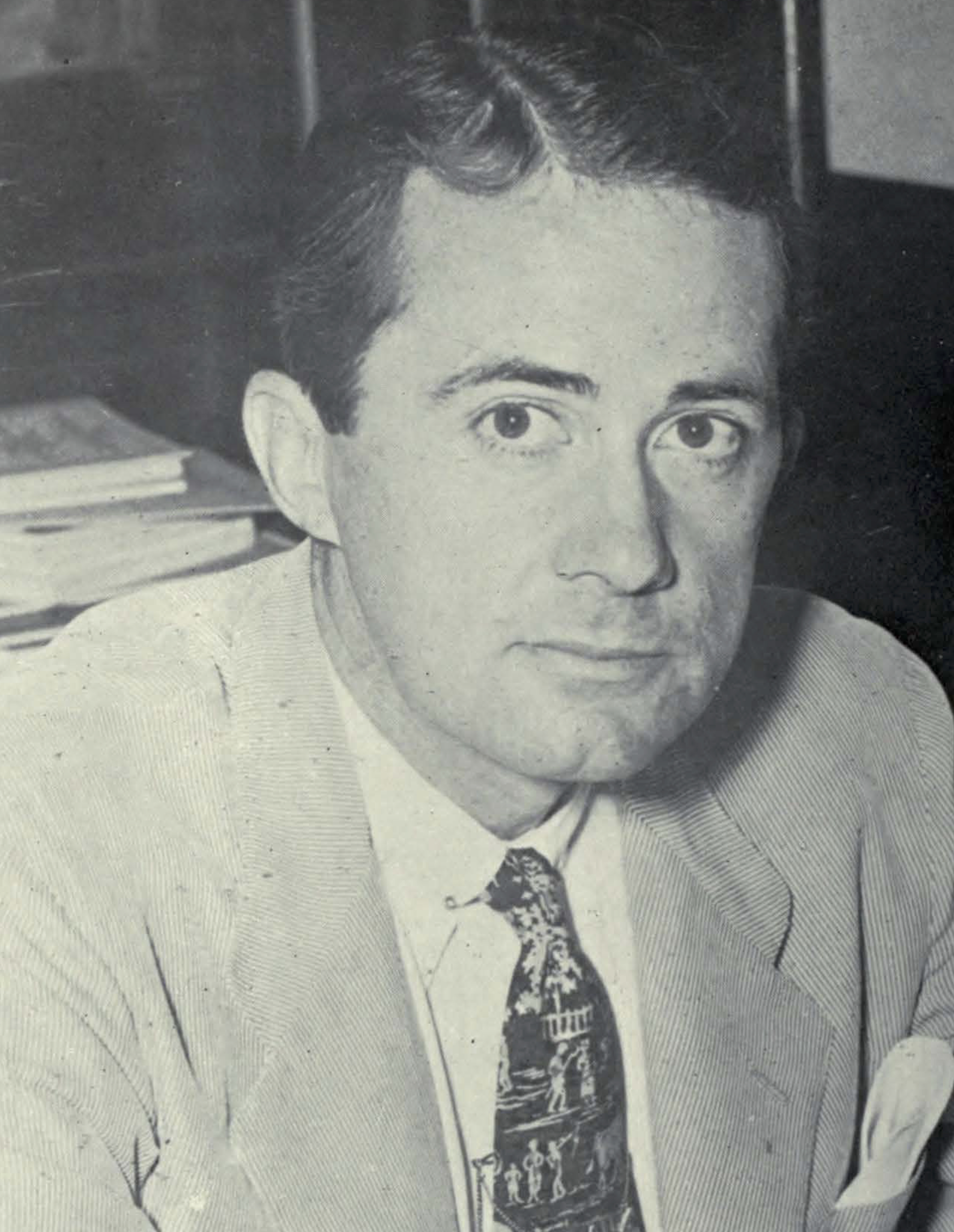

Nominee	Allan Shivers	John A. Donaldson
Party	Democratic	Republican
Popular vote	344,630	31,835
Percentage	91.54%	8.46%
Lieutenant Governor before election
John Lee Smith
Democratic
Elected Lieutenant Governor
Allan Shivers
Democratic

The 1946 Texas lieutenant gubernatorial election was held on November 5, 1946, in order to elect the lieutenant governor of Texas. Democratic nominee and incumbent member of the Texas Senate Allan Shivers defeated Republican nominee John A. Donaldson.

== General election ==
On election day, November 5, 1946, Democratic nominee Allan Shivers won the election by a margin of 312,795 votes against his opponent Republican nominee John A. Donaldson, thereby retaining Democratic control over the office of lieutenant governor. Shivers was sworn in as the 33rd lieutenant governor of Texas on January 21, 1947.

=== Results ===
Texas lieutenant gubernatorial election, 1946
Party	Candidate	Votes	%
Democratic	Allan Shivers	344,630	91.54
Republican	John A. Donaldson	31,835	8.46
	Scattering	19	0.00
Total votes		376,484	100.00
Democratic hold			
