= 1946 Dominican Republic Constitutional Assembly election =

Election in the Dominican Republic

Constitutional Assembly elections were held in the Dominican Republic on 8 December 1946. The role of the Assembly was to review and amend certain articles of the constitution.
