= 1946 Wisconsin lieutenant gubernatorial election =

- November 5, 1946
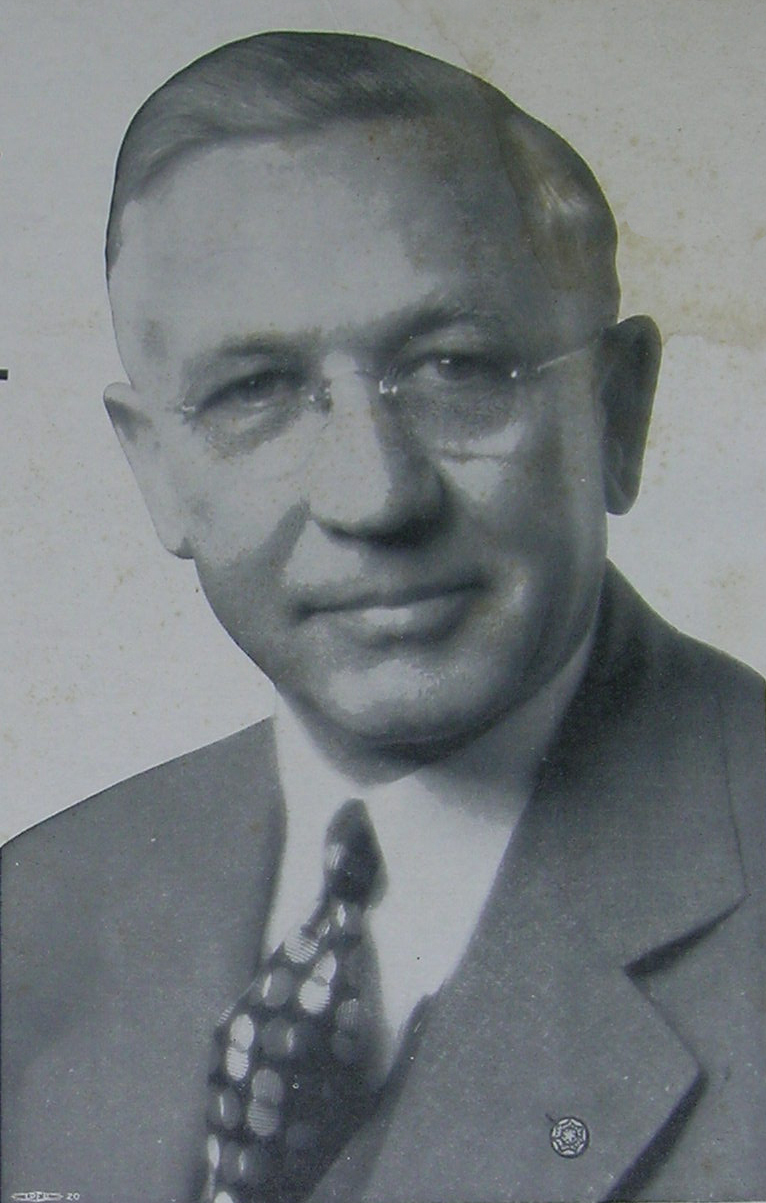

Nominee	Oscar Rennebohm	Lewis F. Nelson
Party	Republican	Democratic
Popular vote	604,054	372,738
Percentage	61.04%	37.67%
- County results Rennebohm: 50–60% 60–70% 70–80% 80–90% Nelson: 40–50% 50–60%
Lieutenant Governor before election
Oscar Rennebohm
Republican
Elected Lieutenant Governor
Oscar Rennebohm
Republican

The 1946 Wisconsin lieutenant gubernatorial election was held on November 5, 1946, in order to elect the lieutenant governor of Wisconsin. Republican nominee and incumbent lieutenant governor Oscar Rennebohm defeated Democratic nominee Lewis F. Nelson and Social-Democratic nominee Walter Roach.

== General election ==
On election day, November 5, 1946, incumbent Republican lieutenant governor Oscar Rennebohm won re-election by a margin of 231,316 votes against his foremost opponent Democratic nominee Lewis F. Nelson, thereby retaining Republican control over the office of lieutenant governor. Rennebohm was sworn in for his second term on January 6, 1947.

=== Results ===
Wisconsin lieutenant gubernatorial election, 1946
Party	Candidate	Votes	%
Republican	Oscar Rennebohm (incumbent)	604,054	61.04
Democratic	Lewis F. Nelson	372,738	37.67
Social-Democratic	Walter Roach	12,699	1.28
	Scattering	94	0.01
Total votes		989,585	100.00
Republican hold			
