= 1945 French legislative election in Algeria =

Elections to the National Assembly of France were held in Algeria on 21 October 1945. The election was held with two colleges, citizens and non-citizens.

== Results ==
Party	First College			Second College			Total seats
Party	Votes	%	Seats	Votes	%	Seats	Total seats
Franco-Muslim Democratic Union				192,545	27.19	4	4
Algerian Communist Party	41,047	12.29	2	136,293	19.24	2	4
Union and Social Progress List				136,109	19.22	3	3
French Section of the Workers' International	71,134	21.30	2	63,646	8.99	1	3
Democratic Union of Muslim Interests				103,261	14.58	2	2
Defense of Muslim-Algerian Personal Status				58,959	8.32	1	1
Democratic Union for Progress and Freedom	41,622	12.46	2				2
French Republicans	40,061	12.00	2				2
Radical Socialists	38,768	11.61	1				1
Indép. Rén. Rép.	28,845	8.64	1				1
Popular Republican Movement	27,240	8.16	1				1
Conc. Rép	24,688	7.39	2				2
UAM				17,435	2.46	0	0
Souver. franc.	14,725	4.41	0				0
RDR	5,837	1.75	0				0
Total	333,967	100.00	13	708,248	100.00	13	26
Valid votes	333,967	97.52		708,248	98.17		
Invalid/blank votes	8,495	2.48		13,203	1.83		
Total votes	342,462	100.00		721,451	100.00		
Registered voters/turnout	501,824	68.24		1,341,978	53.76		
Source: Sternberger et al.
