= 1946 Connecticut lieutenant gubernatorial election =

- November 5, 1946
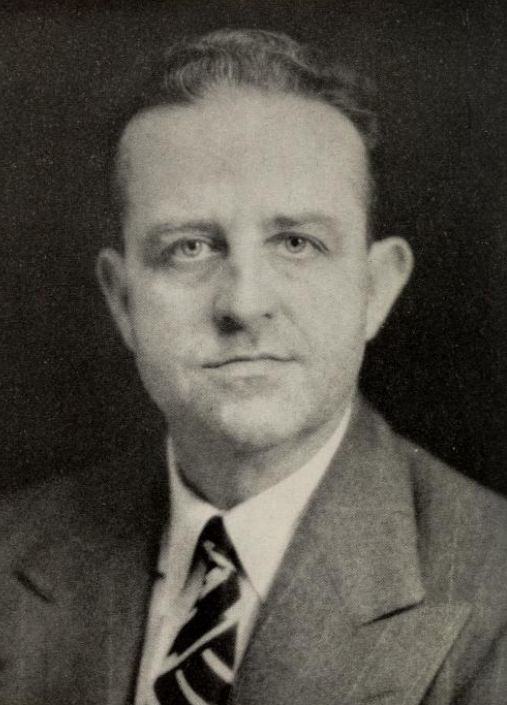

Nominee	James C. Shannon	Stephen K. Elliott
Party	Republican	Democratic
Popular vote	378,734	277,050
Percentage	57.80%	42.20%
Lieutenant Governor before election
Charles Wilbert Snow
Democratic
Elected Lieutenant Governor
James C. Shannon
Republican

The 1946 Connecticut lieutenant gubernatorial election was held on November 5, 1946, to elect the lieutenant governor of Connecticut. Republican nominee James C. Shannon won the election against Democratic nominee Stephen K. Elliott.

== General election ==
On election day, November 5, 1946, Republican nominee James C. Shannon won the election with 57.80% of the vote, thereby gaining Republican control over the office of lieutenant governor. Shannon was sworn in as the 89th lieutenant governor of Connecticut on January 8, 1947.

=== Results ===
Connecticut lieutenant gubernatorial election, 1946
Party	Candidate	Votes	%
Republican	James C. Shannon	378,734	57.80
Democratic	Stephen K. Elliott	277,050	42.20
Total votes		655,784	100.00
Republican gain from Democratic			
