= 1946 Serbian parliamentary election =

1946 parliamentary election in Serbia

Parliamentary elections were held in the People's Republic of Serbia on 10 November 1946 to elect the 287 members of the constituent assembly.

== Background ==
The second session of the Anti-Fascist Council for the National Liberation of Yugoslavia held on 29 and 30 November 1943 resulted in a decision to form a federal Yugoslav state, each of which would have its own national assembly. In November 1944 a Great Anti-fascist People's Liberation Assembly was held in Serbia, with 989 delegates nominated by the People's Liberation Committees and the People's Liberation Front. The delegates elected 278 members from amongst themselves to form the Anti-fascist Assembly of People's Liberation of Serbia. In April 1945 the Assembly was renamed the National Assembly of Serbia.

Prior to the elections taking place, the National Assembly passed an electoral law in July 1946.

== Results ==
Of the 3,776,615 registered voters, 3,428,507 (91%) voted. Nine women were elected.

== Aftermath ==
The National Assembly produced and adopted a new constitution, promulgating it on 17 January 1947.
