= Gabriel d'Arboussier =

Senegalese-French politician

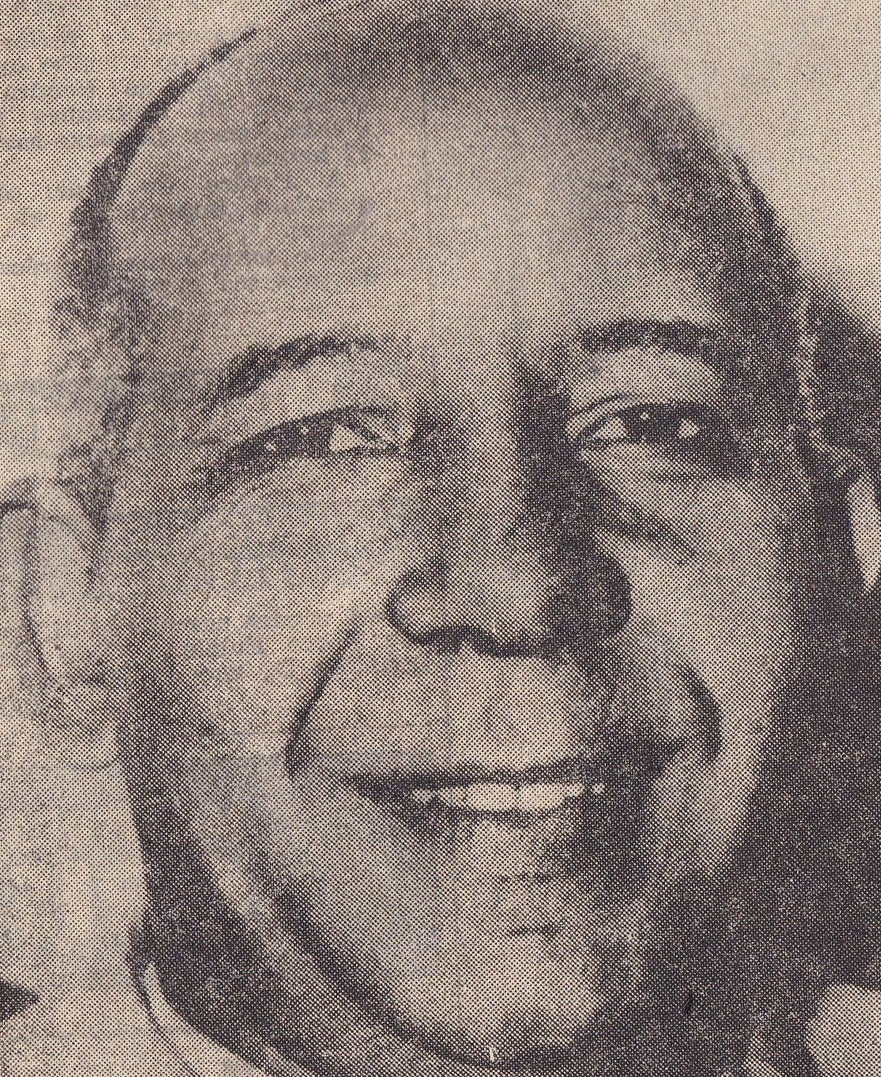
Gabriel d'Arboussier in 1958

Gabriel marquis d'Arboussier (14 January 1908 – 21 December 1976) was a Senegalese-French politician.

Son of the baron Henri d’Arboussier-Monplaisir, a colonial governor (from a wealthy family of farmers) and la princesse Mossi, a Muslim mother, studied in France and began a career as a colonial administrator. D'Arboussier served in the French National Assembly from 1945 until 1946, and from 1946 he was member of Gabon's first constituent assembly under Houphouet-Boigny, a founder of the African Democratic Rally (RDA), where he became secretary general. The same year he was co-opted by his party to be a counselor of the French Union (for Côte d'Ivoire). In 1949, he traveled around the world and made a journey to the Soviet Union.

Arboussier fell out with Houphouet-Boigny, costing him his mandate in the RDA and the French Union.

He was the first Vice-President and Chairman of the Grand Council of the AOF from March 1958 to January 1959. After the wave of decolonization, he became Minister of Justice in Senegal (1960-1962). He also served as a Deputy Director of UNESCO from 1963 to 1964 and ambassador to France at the same time, Deputy Director of the Research Institute of the United Nations (1965-1966) and was Appointed Ambassador to West Germany in 1974.
