= 1945 French legislative election in Guinea =

Elections to the French National Assembly were held in Guinea on 21 October 1945, with a second round of voting on 18 November. Maurice Chevrance-Bertin and Yacine Diallo were elected.

== Electoral system ==
The two seats allocated to the constituency were elected on two separate electoral rolls; French citizens elected one MP from the first college, whilst non-citizens elected one MP in the second college.

== Campaign ==
The elections were effectively a contest between the Fula and Mandinka. However, two Mandinka candidates stood, splitting their vote, whilst Yacine Diallo was the only Fula to stand.

== Results ==
=== First College ===
Candidate	Party	First round		Second round	
Candidate	Party	Votes	%	Votes	%
Maurice Chevrance-Bertin	Democratic and Socialist Union of the Resistance	418	29.84	692	49.08
Jean Ferracci	French Section of the Workers' International	355	25.34	538	38.16
Georges Moreau	Independent	269	19.20	180	12.77
Ibrahima Dow	French Section of the Workers' International	187	13.35		
Vinsot	Community and Guinean Union	89	6.35		
Bacquet-Traoré		31	2.21		
Meunier		21	1.50		
Sanmarcelli		20	1.43		
Maka		11	0.79		
Total		1,401	100.00	1,410	100.00
Valid votes		1,401	98.80	1,410	99.44
Invalid/blank votes		17	1.20	8	0.56
Total votes		1,418	100.00	1,418	100.00
Registered voters/turnout		1,944	72.94	1,944	72.94
Source: De Benoist

=== Second College ===
Candidate	First round		Second round	
Candidate	Votes	%	Votes	%
Yacine Diallo	5,486	43.06	5,774	46.01
Mamba Sano	2,458	19.29	5,065	40.36
Ibrahime Kaba Lamine	1,506	11.82	1,711	13.63
Diafodé Caba	931	7.31		
Mamadoue Fodé Touré	803	6.30		
Amara Soumah	659	5.17		
Mamadou Sow	110	0.86		
Hervé Sylla	102	0.80		
Momo Touré	94	0.74		
N'Fa Mamadou Touré	47	0.37		
Momo Sakho	20	0.16		
Three others	524	4.11		
Total	12,740	100.00	12,550	100.00
Valid votes	12,740	99.31	12,550	99.24
Invalid/blank votes	89	0.69	96	0.76
Total votes	12,829	100.00	12,646	100.00
Registered voters/turnout	16,233	79.03	16,233	77.90
Source: De Benoist

== Aftermath ==
Following the elections, Senegalese MP Lamine Guèye attempted to persuade all the African MPs to form an African Bloc, which would be affiliated with the SFIO. Although, the attempt failed, Diallo did sit with the SFIO.
