= 1945 French legislative election in Morocco =

Elections to the French National Assembly were held in Morocco on 21 October 1945 as part of wider French elections. Three seats were up for election, with three lists winning one seat each. Louis Dumat was elected on the Patriotic and Social Action list, Pierre Parent on the Anti-Fascist Democratic Union list and Jean Léonetti on the French Section of the Workers' International list.

== Results ==
Party	Votes	%	Seats
Patriotic and Social Action (PRL)	19,213	29.14	1
Anti-Fascist Democratic Union (URR–PCF)	17,609	26.71	1
French Section of the Workers' International	11,061	16.78	1
Republican Gaullist Union	7,836	11.88	0
Republican Union of the French Community	4,752	7.21	0
Republican Union	3,305	5.01	0
Democratic and Socialist Union of the Resistance	2,161	3.28	0
Total	65,937	100.00	3
Valid votes	65,937	96.17	
Invalid/blank votes	2,623	3.83	
Total votes	68,560	100.00	
Registered voters/turnout	91,451	74.97	
Source: National Assembly
