= Maurice Bayrou =

French politician

Maurice Bayrou (2 March 1905 in Lanta, Haute-Garonne – 29 December 1996) was a French veterinarian and politician.

Bayrou was a member of the National Assembly from 1946 to 1958, representing the Gabon-Moyen-Congo constituency. During his tenure as a deputy, Bayrou was successively affiliated with the Democratic and Socialist Union of the Resistance, the Rally of the French People, and the National Centre of Social Republicans. He served on the Senate between 1959 and 1977. As a senator, he held the Seine seat until the department's dissolution, and represented Paris afterwards. In the Senate, Bayrou was affiliated with the Union of Democrats for the Republic and the Rally for the Republic.
