= 1945 French legislative election in French Somaliland =

Elections to the French National Assembly were held in French Somaliland on 21 October 1945, with a second round on 4 November as part of the wider parliamentary elections. René Bernard-Cothier was elected as the territory's MP.

== Results ==
| Candidate | First round | | Second round | |
| Candidate | Votes | % | Votes | % |
|---|---|---|---|---|
| Jean-Carles Martine | 182 | 27.74 | 198 | 30.00 |
| René Bernard-Cothier | 167 | 25.46 | 210 | 31.82 |
| Hail Mahmoud | 144 | 21.95 | 136 | 20.61 |
| Abdourahman Banabila | 114 | 17.38 | 109 | 16.52 |
| Two other candidates | 49 | 7.47 | 7 | 1.06 |
| Total | 656 | 100.00 | 660 | 100.00 |
| Valid votes | 656 | 96.76 | 660 | 98.95 |
| Invalid/blank votes | 22 | 3.24 | 7 | 1.05 |
| Total votes | 678 | 100.00 | 667 | 100.00 |
| Registered voters/turnout | 862 | 78.65 | 862 | 77.38 |
Source: Sternberger et al.
