= 1945 French legislative election in Mauritania–Senegal =

Elections to the French National Assembly were held in the constituency of Mauritania–Senegal on 21 October 1945 as part of the wider parliamentary elections. Two members were elected from the seat, with the winners being French Section of the Workers' International (SFIO) candidates Lamine Guèye and Léopold Sédar Senghor.

== Background ==
Senegal and Mauritania were grouped together to form a single constituency, but as Mauritania had so few qualified voters, it was effectively a double constituency for Senegal.

Although relations between the French and Africans in Senegal had improved during World War II, the situation had worsened again towards the end of the conflict. In November 1944 a group of French African soldiers who had been captured by the Germans were returned to Senegal and housed in a base at Thiaroye. When they failed to receive their promised pay in arrears, the soldiers refused an order to board lorries heading for Bamako. As a result, officers opened fire, killing 40 soldiers. What became known as the Thiaroye Massacre was perceived as French ingratitude, and the situation was further inflamed when some of the survivors were sentenced to 10 years in prison by a military tribunal the following year.

Further resentment was caused by a French government decree of 19 February 1945 that extended voting rights in Senegal to European women but not African women, which should not have been possible under the laws passed by Blaise Diagne in 1915 and 1916, which forbade racial differentiation.

== Campaign ==
Following the death of Ngalandou Diouf in 1941, Lamine Guèye was the most experienced politician in France's African colonies. The leader of the Senegalese branch of the SFIO, he had represented the Thiaroye soldiers in court, and was elected mayor of Dakar in July 1945. He decided to forgo party politics during the election campaign, and formed a comité d'entente (committee of agreement) together with the Communists, Gaullists and other political organisations. An agreement was reached to contest the elections as an African Bloc, although this was effectively the other parties lending their support to the SFIO candidates.

Léopold Sédar Senghor was the SFIO's surprise choice for the second college seat. He had lived abroad for several years and only joined the party 16 hours before being chosen as its candidate, largely due to the influence of Lamine Guèye. He was popular with war veterans as he had been a prisoner of war, and was also seen as a good choice as he was born in Senegal and spoke excellent French.

== Results ==
=== First college ===
Candidate	Party	Votes	%
Lamine Guèye	French Section of the Workers' International	20,528	80.69
Ousmane Diop Socé	Independent Socialists	3,633	14.28
Adolphe Maillat		1,278	5.02
Total		25,439	100.00
Valid votes		25,439	95.29
Invalid/blank votes		1,256	4.71
Total votes		26,695	100.00
Registered voters/turnout		44,292	60.27
Source: Sternberger et al.

=== Second college ===
Candidate	Party	Votes	%
Léopold Sédar Senghor	French Section of the Workers' International	15,095	78.92
Ély Manel Fall		1,695	8.86
Charles Cros	Independent Socialists	1,302	6.81
Djim Momar Guèye		964	5.04
Pierre Diagne	African Nationalist Movement	37	0.19
Abderrahmane Koité		33	0.17
Total		19,126	100.00
Valid votes		19,126	93.87
Invalid/blank votes		1,250	6.13
Total votes		20,376	100.00
Registered voters/turnout		25,188	80.90
Source: Sternberger et al.

== Aftermath ==
Following the elections, Lamine Guèye attempted to persuade all the African MPs to form an African Bloc, which would be affiliated with the SFIO. However, the attempt failed.
