= 1945 French legislative election in Tunisia =

Elections to the French National Assembly were held in Tunisia on 21 October 1945 as part of the wider French elections. Two members were elected from the territory, with both seats won by the French Rally, which was linked with the Rally of Left Republicans. The seats were taken by Louis Brunet and Antoine Colonna.

== Results ==
Party	Votes	%	Seats
French Rally	27,429	54.15	2
Democratic Union	12,691	25.05	0
French Section of the Workers' International	7,450	14.71	0
French Communist Party	2,274	4.49	0
Democratic Union of Imperial France	810	1.60	0
Total	50,654	100.00	2
Valid votes	50,654	97.02	
Invalid/blank votes	1,558	2.98	
Total votes	52,212	100.00	
Registered voters/turnout	75,526	69.13	
Source: Sternberger et al.
