= Results of the 2024 French legislative election in Nord =

Following the first round of the 2024 French legislative election on 30 June 2024, runoff elections in each constituency where no candidate received a vote share greater than 50 percent were scheduled for 7 July. Candidates permitted to stand in the runoff elections needed to either come in first or second place in the first round or achieve more than 12.5 percent of the votes of the entire electorate (as opposed to 12.5 percent of the vote share due to low turnout).

== Nord ==
=== 1st constituency ===
Candidate	Party or alliance		First round		Second round	
Candidate	Party or alliance		Votes	%	Votes	%
Aurélien Le Coq	New Popular Front	La France Insoumise	17,800	44.20	27,116	75.49
Carole Leclercq	National Rally		7,298	18.12	8,802	24.51
Vanessa Duhamel	Ensemble	Democratic Movement	7,055	17.52		
Amy Bah	Miscellaneous left	Independent	3,551	8.82		
Brice Lauret	Miscellaneous right	The Republicans	1,951	4.85		
Maxime Legrand	Miscellaneous left	Independent	1,169	2.90		
Allison Marinho	Miscellaneous right	Independent	610	1.51		
Audric Alexandre	Independent	Miscellaneous centre	345	0.86		
Pierre Madelain	Far-left	Lutte Ouvrière	217	0.54		
Michel Laurençot	Miscellaneous left	Independent	199	0.49		
Verena Priem	Volt		58	0.14		
Frédéric Chaouat	Independent		14	0.03		
Adel Bousalham	Miscellaneous left	Independent	1	0.00		
Line Marage	Far-left	Independent	0	0.00		
Total			40,268	100.00	35,918	100.00
Valid votes			40,268	98.35	35,918	90.82
Invalid votes			227	0.55	813	2.06
Blank votes			448	1.09	2,817	7.12
Total votes			40,943	100.00	39,548	100.00
Registered voters/turnout			61,672	66.39	61,672	64.13

=== 2nd constituency ===
Candidate	Party or alliance		First round		Second round	
Candidate	Party or alliance		Votes	%	Votes	%
Ugo Bernalicis	New Popular Front	La France Insoumise	26,491	47.31	29,571	53.20
Philippe Guérard	National Rally		12,256	21.89	13,072	23.52
Violette Salanon	Ensemble	Renaissance	11,630	20.77	12,937	23.28
Caroline Boisard-Vannier	The Republicans		4,378	7.82		
Pascale Rougée	Far-left	Lutte Ouvrière	645	1.15		
Claire Guenon	Volt		385	0.69		
Etienne Testart	Far-left	New Anticapitalist Party (Note: Dissident who ran without the backing of the New Popular Front)	208	0.37		
Total			55,993	100.00	55,580	100.00
Valid votes			55,993	97.82	55,580	97.64
Invalid votes			404	0.71	403	0.71
Blank votes			841	1.47	940	1.65
Total votes			57,238	100.00	56,923	100.00
Registered voters/turnout			87,355	65.52	87,386	65.14

=== 3rd constituency ===
Candidate	Party or alliance		Votes	%
Sandra Delannoy	National Rally		26,874	50.82
Benjamin Saint-Huile	New Popular Front	Miscellaneous left	23,429	44.31
Marie-Claude Rondeaux	Far-left	Lutte Ouvrière	1,697	3.21
Louis Mahieu	Reconquête		876	1.66
Total			52,876	100.00
Valid votes			52,876	96.80
Invalid votes			468	0.86
Blank votes			1,278	2.34
Total votes			54,622	100.00
Registered voters/turnout			91,620	59.62

=== 4th constituency ===
Candidate	Party or alliance		First round		Second round	
Candidate	Party or alliance		Votes	%	Votes	%
Brigitte Liso	Ensemble	Renaissance	21,494	31.32	27,461	40.17
Charlotte Brun	New Popular Front	Socialist Party	20,301	29.58	21,395	31.30
Anne Morand	National Rally		17,832	25.98	19,502	28.53
Sébastien Leblanc	The Republicans		6,461	9.41		
Nicolas Le Neindre	Miscellaneous right	Independent	1,330	1.94		
Fatima Abdellaoui	Far-left	Lutte Ouvrière	539	0.79		
Patrick Jardin	Reconquête		533	0.78		
Franck Boyaval	Volt		144	0.21		
Damien Scali	Far-left	Independent	0	0.00		
Total			68,634	100.00	68,358	100.00
Valid votes			68,634	98.04	68,358	97.85
Invalid votes			403	0.58	428	0.61
Blank votes			967	1.38	1,077	1.54
Total votes			70,004	100.00	69,863	100.00
Registered voters/turnout			101,833	68.74	101,863	68.59

=== 5th constituency ===
Candidate	Party or alliance		First round		Second round	
Candidate	Party or alliance		Votes	%	Votes	%
Victor Catteau	National Rally		27,411	40.08	28,626	43.35
Sébastien Huyghe	Miscellaneous right	The Republicans	23,510	34.37	37,411	56.65
Ophélie Delneste	New Popular Front	La France Insoumise	16,591	24.26		
Raymond Covain	Far-left	Lutte Ouvrière	858	1.25		
Chloé Olivereau	Far-left	New Anticapitalist Party (Note: Dissident who ran without the backing of the New Popular Front)	24	0.04		
Total			68,394	100.00	66,037	100.00
Valid votes			68,394	97.25	66,037	95.64
Invalid votes			475	0.68	740	1.07
Blank votes			1,457	2.07	2,269	3.29
Total votes			70,326	100.00	69,046	100.00
Registered voters/turnout			102,283	68.76	102,381	67.44

=== 6th constituency ===
Candidate	Party or alliance		First round		Second round	
Candidate	Party or alliance		Votes	%	Votes	%
Charlotte Parmentier-Lecocq	Ensemble	Renaissance	25,831	38.09	39,467	60.31
Marie-Hélène Quatreboeufs	Union of the far right	The Republicans	23,781	35.07	25,978	39.69
Célia Pereira	New Popular Front	La France Insoumise	13,243	19.53		
Jimi Erotico	The Republicans		4,265	6.29		
Frédéric Barrez	Far-left	Lutte Ouvrière	687	1.01		
Total			67,807	100.00	65,445	100.00
Valid votes			67,807	97.68	65,445	95.85
Invalid votes			373	0.54	701	1.03
Blank votes			1,236	1.78	2,136	3.13
Total votes			69,416	100.00	68,282	100.00
Registered voters/turnout			95,058	73.02	95,049	71.84

=== 7th constituency ===
Candidate	Party or alliance		First round		Second round	
Candidate	Party or alliance		Votes	%	Votes	%
Félicie Gérard	Ensemble	Horizons	17,168	36.71	18,612	39.53
Karima Chouia	New Popular Front	The Ecologists (France)	15,053	32.19	15,067	32.00
Céline Sayah	National Rally		13,163	28.15	13,408	28.47
Jean-Sébastien Paul Louis Willem	Reconquête		763	1.63		
Nicolas Schuurman	Far-left	Lutte Ouvrière	617	1.32		
Total			46,764	100.00	47,087	100.00
Valid votes			46,764	97.70	47,087	98.17
Invalid votes			341	0.71	239	0.50
Blank votes			760	1.59	637	1.33
Total votes			47,865	100.00	47,963	100.00
Registered voters/turnout			73,444	65.17	73,452	65.30

=== 8th constituency ===
Candidate	Party or alliance		First round		Second round	
Candidate	Party or alliance		Votes	%	Votes	%
David Guiraud	New Popular Front	La France Insoumise	17,405	48.50	22,080	64.32
Ethan Leys	National Rally		11,051	30.80	12,250	35.68
Tarik Mekki	Ensemble	Renaissance	5,766	16.07		
Maël Camerlynck	Sovereigntist right	Debout la France	1,011	2.82		
Françoise Delbarre	Far-left	Lutte Ouvrière	652	1.82		
Total			35,885	100.00	34,330	100.00
Valid votes			35,885	97.05	34,330	92.23
Invalid votes			345	0.93	697	1.87
Blank votes			745	2.01	2,195	5.90
Total votes			36,975	100.00	37,222	100.00
Registered voters/turnout			68,933	53.64	68,959	53.98

=== 9th constituency ===
Candidate	Party or alliance		First round		Second round	
Candidate	Party or alliance		Votes	%	Votes	%
Violette Spillebout	Ensemble	Renaissance	20,620	34.01	27,081	45.10
Odile Vidal-Sagnier	New Popular Front	The Ecologists	18,869	31.12	19,351	32.23
Christine Landru	National Rally		12,533	20.67	13,616	22.68
Alice Pogam	The Republicans		5,572	9.19		
Charles Delavenne	Miscellaneous right	Independent	1,832	3.02		
Valérie Talpaert	Reconquête		561	0.93		
Chantal Sarazin	Far-left	Lutte Ouvrière	477	0.79		
Frédéric Gruzon	Volt		161	0.27		
Mathias Dhelin	Far-left	Independent	4	0.01		
Total			60,629	100.00	60,048	100.00
Valid votes			60,629	98.45	60,048	98.10
Invalid votes			299	0.49	281	0.46
Blank votes			656	1.07	881	1.44
Total votes			61,584	100.00	61,210	100.00
Registered voters/turnout			92,045	66.91	92,071	66.48

=== 10th constituency ===
Candidate	Party or alliance		First round		Second round	
Candidate	Party or alliance		Votes	%	Votes	%
Gérald Darmanin	Ensemble	Renaissance	17,512	36.03	28,603	61.37
Bastien Verbrugghe	National Rally		16,675	34.31	18,001	38.63
Leslie Mortreux	New Popular Front	La France Insoumise	12,065	24.82		
Jérôme Garcia	Miscellaneous right	Independent	1,447	2.98		
Christophe Charlon	Far-left	Lutte Ouvrière	535	1.10		
Gustave Viguie-Desplaces	Reconquête		249	0.51		
Marcellin Brazon	Miscellaneous right	Independent	118	0.24		
Total			48,601	100.00	46,604	100.00
Valid votes			48,601	97.81	46,604	95.27
Invalid votes			276	0.56	593	1.21
Blank votes			814	1.64	1,719	3.51
Total votes			49,691	100.00	48,916	100.00
Registered voters/turnout			83,192	59.73	83,225	58.78

=== 11th constituency ===
Candidate	Party or alliance		First round		Second round	
Candidate	Party or alliance		Votes	%	Votes	%
Roger Vicot	New Popular Front	Socialist Party	22,809	38.49	33,740	61.25
Maxime Moulin	National Rally		18,650	31.47	21,347	38.75
Ingrid Brulant-Fortin	Ensemble	Renaissance	16,559	27.94		
Carole Bailleul	Far-left	Lutte Ouvrière	778	1.31		
Jonathan Wilson	Far-left	Independent	450	0.76		
Robin Coupigny	Far-left	Independent	17	0.03		
Total			59,263	100.00	55,087	100.00
Valid votes			59,263	97.45	55,087	92.08
Invalid votes			504	0.83	1,052	1.76
Blank votes			1,047	1.72	3,688	6.16
Total votes			60,814	100.00	59,827	100.00
Registered voters/turnout			93,191	65.26	93,231	64.17

=== 12th constituency ===
Candidate	Party or alliance		Votes	%
Michael Taverne	National Rally		31,567	54.74
Sébastien Seguin	Miscellaneous right	Independent	12,279	21.29
Bernard Baudoux	New Popular Front	Communist Party	11,992	20.80
Isabelle Prevost	Reconquête		932	1.62
Laurent Lehrhaupt	Far-left	Lutte Ouvrière	894	1.55
Total			57,664	100.00
Valid votes			57,664	97.02
Invalid votes			510	0.86
Blank votes			1,263	2.12
Total votes			59,437	100.00
Registered voters/turnout			93,070	63.86

=== 13th constituency ===
Candidate	Party or alliance		First round		Second round	
Candidate	Party or alliance		Votes	%	Votes	%
Maxence Accart	National Rally		21,662	43.52	23,021	46.24
Julien Gokel (Note: Dissident who ran without the backing of the New Popular Front)	Miscellaneous left	Socialist Party	16,026	32.20	26,769	53.76
Damien Lacroix	New Popular Front	La France Insoumise	10,913	21.92		
Damien Lacroix	Far-left	Lutte Ouvrière	1,175	2.36		
Total			49,776	100.00	49,790	100.00
Valid votes			49,776	96.95	49,790	96.39
Invalid votes			392	0.76	520	1.01
Blank votes			1,173	2.28	1,346	2.61
Total votes			51,341	100.00	51,656	100.00
Registered voters/turnout			86,045	59.67	86,061	60.02

=== 14th constituency ===
Candidate	Party or alliance		First round		Second round	
Candidate	Party or alliance		Votes	%	Votes	%
Jean-Baptiste Gardes	Union of the far right	The Republicans	30,194	46.37	32,114	49.85
Paul Christophe	Miscellaneous right	Horizons	23,928	36.74	32,303	50.15
Philippine Heyman	New Popular Front	La France Insoumise	8,876	13.63		
Sandrine Desrayaud	Far-left		1,091	1.68		
Anne-Lise Perche	Sovereigntist right	Independent	1,033	1.59		
Total			65,122	100.00	64,417	100.00
Valid votes			65,122	97.25	64,417	96.46
Invalid votes			514	0.77	696	1.04
Blank votes			1,328	1.98	1,671	2.50
Total votes			66,964	100.00	66,784	100.00
Registered voters/turnout			99,449	67.34	99,470	67.14

=== 15th constituency ===
Candidate	Party or alliance		First round		Second round	
Candidate	Party or alliance		Votes	%	Votes	%
Pierrick Berteloot	National Rally		29,894	45.97	31,970	49.80
Jean-Pierre Bataille	Miscellaneous right	Renaissance	22,206	34.15	32,228	50.20
Emilie Ducourant	New Popular Front	Ecologists	11,853	18.23		
Benjamin Dubiez	Far-left	Lutte Ouvrière	1,078	1.66		
Total			65,031	100.00	64,198	100.00
Valid votes			65,031	97.22	64,198	95.82
Invalid votes			647	0.97	912	1.36
Blank votes			1,214	1.81	1,889	2.82
Total votes			66,892	100.00	66,999	100.00
Registered voters/turnout			97,601	68.54	97,625	68.63

=== 16th constituency ===
Candidate	Party or alliance		Votes	%
Matthieu Marchio	National Rally		26,608	53.12
Alain Bruneel	New Popular Front	Communist Party	14,199	28.35
François Cresta	Ensemble	Democratic Movement	8,135	16.24
Éric Pecqueur	Far-left	Lutte Ouvrière	1,145	2.29
Total			50,087	100.00
Valid votes			50,087	97.08
Invalid votes			416	0.81
Blank votes			1,091	2.11
Total votes			51,594	100.00
Registered voters/turnout			84,041	61.39

=== 17th constituency ===
Candidate	Party or alliance		First round		Second round	
Candidate	Party or alliance		Votes	%	Votes	%
Thierry Tesson	National Rally		21,803	47.92	23,873	55.80
Frédéric Chéreau	New Popular Front	Socialist Party	13,575	29.84	18,913	44.20
Guillaume Honoré	Ensemble	Horizons	5,739	12.61		
Loick Brouazin	The Republicans		3,627	7.97		
Cedric Fluckiger	Far-left	Lutte Ouvrière	751	1.65		
Total			45,495	100.00	42,786	100.00
Valid votes			45,495	97.37	42,786	93.42
Invalid votes			370	0.79	691	1.51
Blank votes			860	1.84	2,323	5.07
Total votes			46,725	100.00	45,800	100.00
Registered voters/turnout			73,875	63.25	73,889	61.98

=== 18th constituency ===
Candidate	Party or alliance		Votes	%
Alexandre Dufosset	National Rally		29,404	52.51
Nicolas Siegler	Miscellaneous right	Independent	18,434	32.92
Benoît Marechal	New Popular Front	La France Insoumise	7,230	12.91
Nadine Reynaert	Far-left	Lutte Ouvrière	930	1.66
Total			55,998	100.00
Valid votes			55,998	97.54
Invalid votes			415	0.72
Blank votes			998	1.74
Total votes			57,411	100.00
Registered voters/turnout			90,821	63.21

=== 19th constituency ===
Candidate	Party or alliance		Votes	%
Sébastien Chenu	National Rally		27,592	58.32
Cédric Brun	New Popular Front	La France Insoumise	10,337	21.85
Franck Watelet	Ensemble	Miscellaneous centre	7,136	15.08
Djemi Drici	Independent		1,150	2.43
Cécile Bourlet	Far-left	Lutte Ouvrière	1,098	2.32
Total			47,313	100.00
Valid votes			47,313	97.05
Invalid votes			449	0.92
Blank votes			989	2.03
Total votes			48,751	100.00
Registered voters/turnout			80,890	60.27

=== 20th constituency ===
Candidate	Party or alliance		Votes	%
Guillaume Florquin	National Rally		23,852	50.30
Fabien Roussel	New Popular Front	Communist Party	14,791	31.19
Pierre-Luc Vervandier	Ensemble	Democratic Movement	5,010	10.57
Élisabeth Gondy	The Republicans	Union of Democrats and Independents (Note: Dissident who ran without the backing of Ensemble)	3,087	6.51
Dimitri Mozdzierz	Far-left	Lutte Ouvrière	679	1.43
Total			47,419	100.00
Valid votes			47,419	97.75
Invalid votes			335	0.69
Blank votes			757	1.56
Total votes			48,511	100.00
Registered voters/turnout			82,190	59.02

=== 21st constituency ===
Candidate	Party or alliance		First round		Second round	
Candidate	Party or alliance		Votes	%	Votes	%
Laurence Bara	National Rally		21,337	43.61	22,974	48.41
Valérie Létard	Ensemble	Union of Democrats and Independents	14,280	29.19	24,485	51.59
Pierrick Colpin	New Popular Front	La France Insoumise	11,290	23.08		
Édith Duquesnoy	Far-left	Lutte Ouvrière	726	1.48		
Laurent Lasselin	Miscellaneous right	Debout la France	709	1.45		
Séverine Duminy	Reconquête		580	1.19		
Total			48,922	100.00	47,459	100.00
Valid votes			48,922	97.53	47,459	96.61
Invalid votes			357	0.71	447	0.91
Blank votes			884	1.76	1,217	2.48
Total votes			50,163	100.00	49,123	100.00
Registered voters/turnout			81,160	61.81	81,173	60.52
