= Nord's 11th constituency =

Constituency of the National Assembly of France

11th constituency of the Nord
- inline Constituency of the National Assembly of France

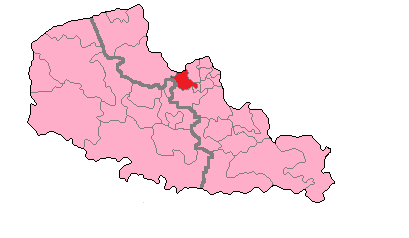
- Nord's 11th Constituency shown within Nord-Pas-de-Calais
- Deputy: Roger Vicot; PS
- Department: Nord
- Cantons: Armentières, Lille-Sud-Ouest, Lomme
- Registered voters: 90,403

The 11th constituency of the Nord is a French legislative constituency in the Nord département.

== Description ==
Following the 2010 redistricting of French legislative constituencies La Bassée was removed from this constituency to be placed within Nord's 5th constituency and Lille-Sud-Ouest was added in its place.

Until 2017, the seat supported the Socialist Party and its predecessor SFIO at every election since 1958 with the sole exception of the conservative landslide of 1993. The Socialist Party regained the seat from LREM in 2022.

== Historic Representation ==
Election	Member	Party
1958	Albert Denvers	SFIO
1962	Albert Denvers	SFIO
1967	Albert Denvers	SFIO
1968	Albert Denvers	SFIO
1973	Albert Denvers	SFIO
1978	Albert Denvers	PS
1981	Albert Denvers	PS
1986	Proportional representation - no election by constituency	
1988	Yves Durand	PS
1993	Françoise Hostalier	UDF
1997	Yves Durand	PS
2002	Yves Durand	PS
2007	Yves Durand	PS
2012	Yves Durand	PS
2017	Laurent Pietraszewski	LREM
2020	Florence Morlighem	LREM
2022	Roger Vicot	PS

== Election results ==
=== 2024 ===
Legislative Election 2024: Nord's 11th constituency
Party	Candidate	Votes	%	±%
RE (Ensemble)	Ingrid Brulant-Fortin	16,559	27.94	+2.37
DIV	Jonathan Wilson	450	0.76	N/A
RN	Maxime Moulin	18,650	31.47	+14.30
PS (NFP)	Roger Vicot	22,809	38.49	+3.0
DIV	Robin Coupigny	17	0.03	N/A
LO	Carole Bailleul	778	1.31	N/A
Turnout		59,263	97.45	+51.31
Registered electors		60,814		
2nd round result
PS	Roger Vicot	33,740	61.25	+22.76
RN	Maxime Moulin	21,347	38.75	+7.28
Turnout		55,087	92.08	−5.37
Registered electors		92,231		
PS hold		Swing		

=== 2022 ===
Legislative Election 2022: Nord's 11th constituency
Party	Candidate	Votes	%	±%
PS (NUPÉS)	Roger Vicot	15,178	35.43	+3.92
LREM (Ensemble)	Laurent Pietraszewski	10,953	25.57	-5.06
RN	Maxime Moulin	7,355	17.17	+1.38
LR (UDC)	Michel Plouy	3,765	8.79	−5.01
DVE	Priscilla Cherpin	1,935	4.52	N/A
REC	Eddy Casterman	1,438	3.36	N/A
PA	Sophie Goudenhooft	984	2.30	N/A
Others	N/A	1,229		
Turnout		42,837	46.14	−1.25
2nd round result
PS (NUPÉS)	Roger Vicot	22,143	56.27	N/A
LREM (Ensemble)	Laurent Pietraszewski	17,210	43.73	−23.44
Turnout		39,353	44.65	+3.75
PS gain from LREM				

=== 2017 ===
Candidate	Label	First round		Second round	
Candidate	Label	Votes	%	Votes	%
Laurent Pietraszewski	REM	13,110	30.63	22,645	67.17
Nathalie Acs	FN	6,760	15.79	11,067	32.83
Karine Charbonnier	LR	5,908	13.80		
Sébastien Polveche	FI	5,520	12.90		
Roger Vicot	PS	4,460	10.42		
Arnaud Marié	PCF	1,762	4.12		
Lise Daleux	ECO	1,743	4.07		
Denis Vinckier	DVD	891	2.08		
Priscilla Cherpin	ECO	852	1.99		
Christophe Devliegher	DLF	589	1.38		
Fatima Abdellaoui	EXG	321	0.75		
Jean-François Plouvier	ECO	246	0.57		
Marceline Boyeldieu	DIV	231	0.54		
Yahya Benasaïd	ECO	182	0.43		
Florian Leroy	EXG	171	0.40		
Corentin Devos	DIV	52	0.12		
Brigitte Parnaudeau	DVD	1	0.00		
Dominique Chombeau	REG	1	0.00		
Votes		42,800	100.00	33,712	100.00
Valid votes		42,800	98.09	33,712	89.52
Blank votes		553	1.27	2,846	7.56
Null votes		279	0.64	1,101	2.92
Turnout		43,632	47.39	37,659	40.90
Abstentions		48,437	52.61	54,408	59.10
Registered voters		92,069		92,067	
Source: Ministry of the Interior

=== 2012 ===
Legislative Election 2012: Nord's 11th constituency
Party	Candidate	Votes	%	±%
PS	Yves Durand	18,766	39.49	
NM	Thierry Pauchet	12,563	26.44	
FN	Nathalie Acs	8,163	17.18	
FG	Arnaud Marie	3,438	7.23	
EELV	Lise Daleux	1,797	3.78	
MoDem	Yann Fournier	1,151	2.42	
Others	N/A	1,642		
Turnout		47,520	52.57	
2nd round result
PS	Yves Durand	25,420	58.11	
NM	Thierry Pauchet	18,321	41.89	
Turnout		43,741	48.38	
PS hold				

=== 2007 ===
Legislative Election 2007: Nord's 11th constituency
Party	Candidate	Votes	%	±%
UMP	Philippe Waymel	19,006	36.98	
PS	Yves Durand	17,906	34.84	
MoDem	Brigitte Brame	3,088	6.01	
FN	Luc Pecharman	3,076	5.98	
PCF	Eric Bocquet	2,883	5.61	
LV	Lise Daleux	1,477	2.87	
Others	N/A	3,964		
Turnout		52,300	60.21	
2nd round result
PS	Yves Durand	26,588	52.28	
UMP	Philippe Waymel	24,272	47.72	
Turnout		52,440	60.37	
PS hold				

=== 2002 ===
Legislative Election 2002: Nord's 11th constituency
Party	Candidate	Votes	%	±%
PS	Yves Durand	17,369	33.53	
UMP	Philippe Waymel	13,144	25.38	
FN	Luc Pecharman	7,840	15.14	
UDF	Denis Vinckier	3,212	6.20	
PCF	Eric Bocquet	2,565	4.95	
DVD	Jean-Pierre Michaux	1,609	3.11	
LV	Philippe Crispyn	1,229	2.37	
Others	N/A	4,828		
Turnout		52,961	62.83	
2nd round result
PS	Yves Durand	24,237	50.82	
UMP	Philippe Waymel	23,459	49.18	
Turnout		50,028	59.35	
PS hold				

=== 1997 ===
Legislative Election 1997: Nord's 11th constituency
Party	Candidate	Votes	%	±%
PS	Yves Durand	18,896	34.26	
UDF	Françoise Hostalier	12,804	23.22	
FN	Pascal Gannat	9,770	17.72	
PCF	Eric Bocquet	5,456	9.89	
DVD	Yves-Marie Bernier	1,861	3.37	
LO	Hubert Sénéchal	1,712	3.10	
LV	Jean-Louis Maniez	1,534	2.78	
Others	N/A	3,115		
Turnout		57,706	71.86	
2nd round result
PS	Yves Durand	32,260	59.11	
UDF	Françoise Hostalier	22,312	40.89	
Turnout		58,347	72.67	
PS gain from UDF				

== Sources ==
- Official results of French elections from 1998: "Résultats électoraux officiels en France" (in French).
