= Nord's 15th constituency =

Constituency of the National Assembly of France

15th constituency of the Nord
- inline Constituency of the National Assembly of France

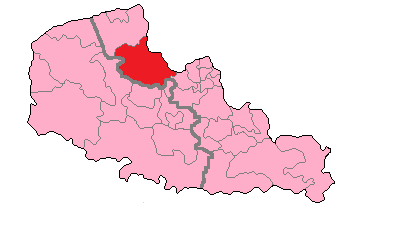
- Nord's 15th Constituency shown within Nord-Pas-de-Calais
- Deputy: Jean-Pierre Bataille; Miscellaneous right
- Department: Nord
- Cantons: Bailleul-Nord-Est, Bailleul-Sud-Ouest, Cassel, Hazebrouck-Nord, Hazebrouck-Sud, Merville, Steenvoorde
- Registered voters: 95,226

The 15th constituency of the Nord is a French legislative constituency in the Nord département.

== Description ==
Nord's 15th constituency includes the large towns of Bailleul and Hazebrouck in the north west of the department.

The constituency swang between left and right from 1988 to 2017 having previously been dominated by the French Communist Party throughout the 1960s and 1970s. Jean-Pierre Allossery of the PS gained the seat at the 2012 French legislative election from the conservative Union for a Popular Movement. It was part of the La République En Marche! landslide win in the 2017 French legislative election, but the deputy, Jennifer de Temmerman, left the party and in May 2020, she was one of the 17 initial members of the short-lived Ecology Democracy Solidarity group in the National Assembly, but left shortly after to become part of the Liberties and Territories group. The seat was gained by Pierrick Berteloot of the far-right RN in the 2022 election.

== Historic Representation ==
Election	Member	Party
1958	Georges Sarazin	UNR
1962	Arthur Ramette	PCF
1967	Arthur Ramette	PCF
1968	Arthur Ramette	PCF
1973	Georges Hage	PCF
1978	Georges Hage	PCF
1981	Georges Hage	PCF
1986	Proportional representation - no election by constituency	
1988	Maurice Sergheraert	SE
1993	Marie-Fanny Gournay	RPR
1997	Jean Delobel	PS
2002	Françoise Hostalier	UMP
2007	Françoise Hostalier	UMP
2012	Jean-Pierre Allossery	PS
2017	Jennifer de Temmerman	LREM
2020	Jennifer de Temmerman	EDS
2020	Jennifer de Temmerman	LT
2022	Pierrick Berteloot	RN
2024	Jean-Pierre Bataille	DVD

== Election results ==
=== 2024 ===
Legislative Election 2024: Nord's 15th constituency
Party	Candidate	Votes	%	±%
RN	Pierrick Berteloot	29,894	45.97	+19.55
RE (Ensemble)	Jean-Pierre Bataille	22,206	34.15	+16.55
LÉ–EELV (NFP)	Emilie Ducourant	11,853	18.23	−1.80
LO	Benjamin Dubiez	1,078	1.66	n/a
Turnout		65,031	97.22	+48.90
Registered electors		97,601		
2nd round result
RE	Jean-Pierre Bataille	32,228	50.20	+16.05
RN	Pierrick Berteloot	31,970	49.80	+3.83
Turnout		64,198	95.82	−1.40
Registered electors		97,625		
RE gain from RN				

=== 2022 ===
Legislative Election 2022: Nord's 15th constituency
Party	Candidate	Votes	%	±%
RN	Pierrick Berteloot	12,133	26.42	+5.83
EELV (NUPÉS)	Emilie Ducourant	9,200	20.03	-1.53
LREM (Ensemble)	Claude Nicolet	8,084	17.60	−10.48
LR (UDC)	Stephane Dieusaert	4,910	10.69	−16.35
DVD	Jérôme Darques	2,540	5.53	N/A
DVD	Caroline Landtsheere	1,451	3.16	N/A
Others	N/A	7,605	16.56	
Turnout		45,923	48.32	−4.08
2nd round result
RN	Pierrick Berteloot	21,367	54.09	+14.78
EELV (NUPÉS)	Emilie Ducourant	18,134	45.91	N/A
Turnout		39,501	47.02	+0.23
RN gain from LREM				

=== 2017 ===
Candidate	Label	First round		Second round	
Candidate	Label	Votes	%	Votes	%
Jennifer de Temmerman	REM	13,764	28.08	24,519	60.69
Pascal Prince	FN	10,095	20.59	15,881	39.31
Jean-Pierre Bataille	LR	7,951	16.22		
Hervé Walraeve	FI	6,018	12.28		
Bruno Ficheux	UDI	5,305	10.82		
Michel Labitte	PS	3,326	6.79		
Guillaume Fache	ECO	1,219	2.49		
Luc Dubois	EXG	615	1.25		
Gautier Leclaire	ECO	500	1.02		
Clotilde Poilly	DIV	226	0.46		
Votes		49,019	100.00	40,400	100.00
Valid votes		49,019	97.58	40,400	90.06
Blank votes		856	1.70	3,033	6.76
Null votes		360	0.72	1,426	3.18
Turnout		50,235	52.40	44,859	46.79
Abstentions		45,633	47.60	51,013	53.21
Registered voters		95,868		95,872	
Source: Ministry of the Interior

=== 2012 ===
Legislative Election 2012: Nord's 15th constituency
Party	Candidate	Votes	%	±%
PS	Jean-Pierre Allossery	21,526	37.77	
DVD	Jean-Pierre Bataille	10,734	18.84	
UMP	Françoise Hostalier	10,543	18.50	
FN	Pascal Prince	9,290	16.30	
FG	Béatrice Veit-Torrez	2,067	3.63	
EELV	Thierry Willaey	1,597	2.80	
Others	N/A	1,231		
Turnout		56,988	59.85	
2nd round result
PS	Jean-Pierre Allossery	28,361	52.13	
DVD	Jean-Pierre Bataille	26,043	47.87	
Turnout		54,404	57.13	
PS gain from UMP				

=== 2007 ===
Legislative Election 2007: Nord's 15th constituency
Party	Candidate	Votes	%	±%
UMP	Françoise Hostalier	15,589	36.19	
PS	Françoise Polnecq	10,007	23.23	
DVD	Marc Normand	4,643	10.78	
MoDem	Dominique Hallynck	4,405	10.23	
FN	Marie Duchet	2,368	5.50	
Far left	Sandrine Cypryszczak	1,148	2.67	
LV	Ginette Verbrugghe	989	2.30	
PCF	Béatrice Veit-Torrez	906	2.10	
Others	N/A	3,019		
Turnout		44,637	60.21	
2nd round result
UMP	Françoise Hostalier	21,705	51.87	
PS	Françoise Polnecq	20,136	48.13	
Turnout		43,896	59.21	
UMP gain from PS				

=== 2002 ===
Legislative Election 2002: Nord's 15th constituency
Party	Candidate	Votes	%	±%
PS	Jean Delobel	14,169	31.46	
UMP	Beatrice Descamps	8,108	18.00	
FN	Marie Perrel	5,278	11.72	
DL	Françoise Hostalier	4,165	9.25	
UDF	Christian Defebvre	3,755	8.34	
DVD	Jean-Pierre Laczny	3,541	7.86	
LV	Alain Dubois	1,067	2.37	
CPNT	Anne Abadie	1,017	2.26	
Others	N/A	3,933		
Turnout		46,525	65.34	
2nd round result
PS	Jean Delobel	21,486	50.27	
UMP	Beatrice Descamps	21,259	49.73	
Turnout		44,896	63.02	
PS hold				

=== 1997 ===
Legislative Election 1997: Nord's 15th constituency
Party	Candidate	Votes	%	±%
PS	Jean Delobel	13,438	28.90	
DVD	Paul Blondel	13,269	28.53	
FN	Hubert Maes	6,467	13.91	
PCF	Alain Pocholle	4,461	9.59	
DVG	Christian Defebvre	3,040	6.54	
DVD	Martin Masson	2,383	5.12	
GE	Dominique Chambaut	1,420	3.05	
DVE	Modeste Vanhoutte	1,020	2.19	
DVE	Alain Dubois	1,008	2.17	
Turnout		49,767	74.54	
2nd round result
PS	Jean Delobel	25,952	54.13	
DVD	Paul Blondel	21,989	45.87	
Turnout		51,402	77.30	
PS gain from RPR				

== Sources and References ==
- Official results of French elections from 1998: "Résultats électoraux officiels en France" (in French).
