= Souques =

Souques or Souquès is a French surname. Notable people with the surname include:

- Alexandre-Achille Souques (1860–1944), French neurologist
- Pierre Souquès (1910–2007), French politician
