= Laurent Pietraszewski =

French politician

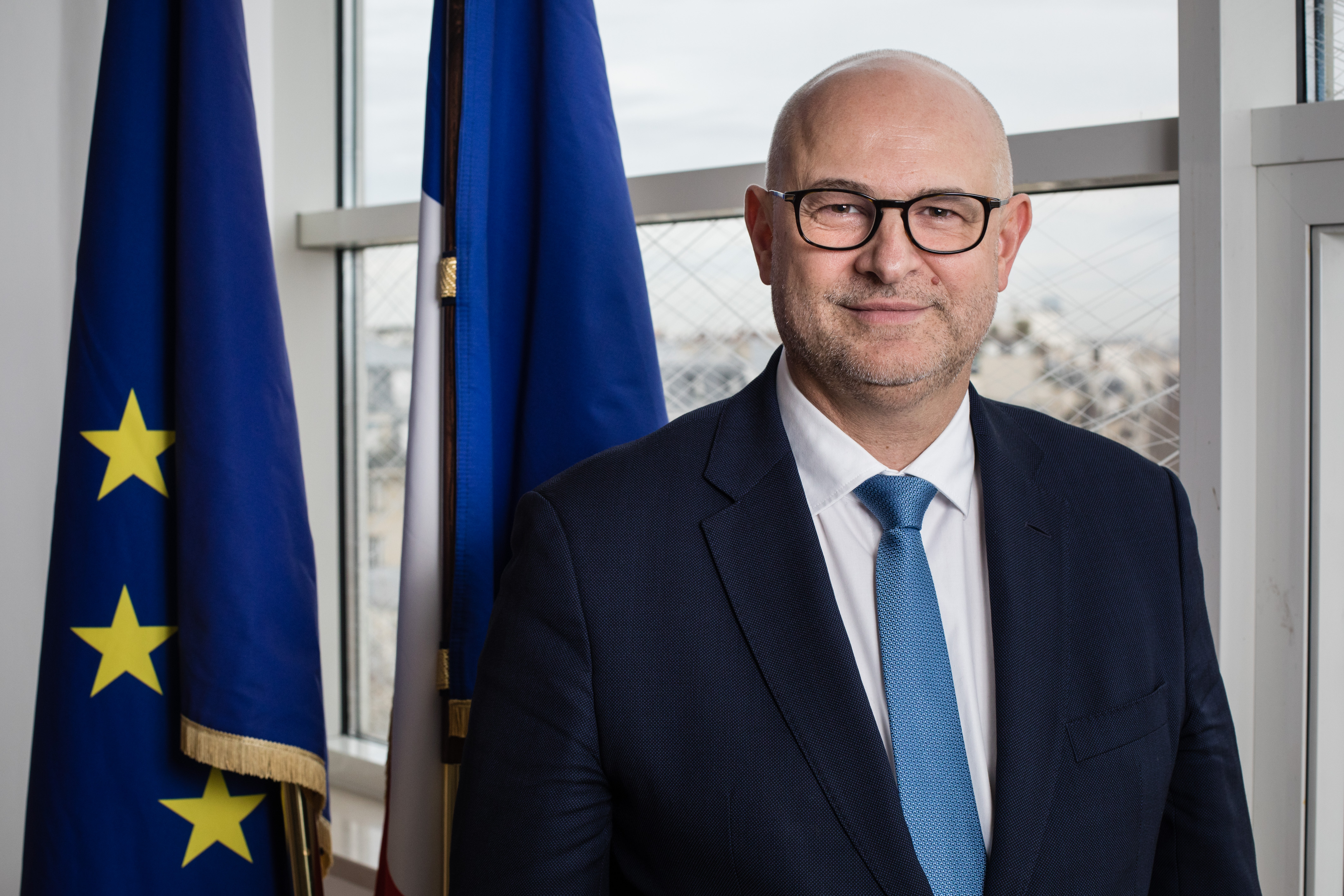
- Laurent Pietraszewski in 2019

Secretary of State to Pensions
- In office 17 December 2019 – 20 May 2022
- President: Emmanuel Macron
- Prime Minister: Édouard Philippe; Jean Castex
- Preceded by: Jean-Paul Delevoye

Member of the National Assembly for Nord's 11th constituency
- In office 21 June 2017 – 17 January 2020
- Preceded by: Yves Durand
- Succeeded by: Florence Morlighem

Personal details
- Born: 19 November 1966 (age 59) Saint-Denis, France
- Party: La République En Marche!
- Education: University of Lille

Laurent Pietraszewski (born 19 November 1966) is a French politician of La République En Marche! (LREM) who served as Secretary of State for Pensions in the governments of successive Prime Ministers Édouard Philippe and Jean Castex from 2019 to 2022.

== Early career ==
Prior to his election, Pietraszewski had never been politically active. He was Director of Human resources at Auchan.

== Political career ==
Pietraszewski became a member of the French National Assembly in the 2017 elections, representing department of Nord's 11th constituency.

In parliament, Pietraszewski served as member of the Committee on Economic Affairs, where he was his parliamentary group's coordinator from 2018 until 2019. Within his parliamentary group, he was one of the proponents of the government's plans for a reform of the pensions system. In late 2019, he briefly served as one of his parliamentary group's spokespersons under the leadership of its chairman Gilles Le Gendre.

In December 2019, Pietraszewski was appointed to replace Jean-Paul Delevoye as Secretary of State for Pensions, serving under the leadership of successive Ministers of Health Agnès Buzyn (2019–2020) and Olivier Véran (since 2020).

For the 2021 regional elections, Pietraszewski was nominated as LREM's candidate to become President of the Regional Council of Hauts-de-France, challenging incumbent Xavier Bertrand.

In the 2022 French legislative election, he lost his seat to Roger Vicot from the Socialist Party (NUPES).

=== Political positions ===
In July 2019, Pietraszewski voted in favor of the French ratification of the European Union’s Comprehensive Economic and Trade Agreement (CETA) with Canada.

== See also ==
- 2017 French legislative election
