= Radical Party (France) =

Radical Party Parti radical
- President: Nathalie Delattre
- Founded: 23 June 1901; 125 years ago
- Headquarters: 1 Place de Valois, 75001 Paris
- Youth wing: Young Radicals
- LGBT wing: GayLib (since 2018)
- Membership (2014): 7,925
- Ideology: Social liberalism; Historical: Radicalism
- Political position: Centre (since 2017); Historical: Far-left (19th century); Left-wing (early 20th century); Centre-left (1913–1944); Centre (1944–1972); Centre-right (1972–2017)
- National affiliation: Ensemble; Historical: UDF (1978–2002); UMP (2002–2011); ARES (2011–2012); UDI (2012–2017); MR (2017–2021)
- European affiliation: Alliance of Liberals and Democrats for Europe
- European Parliament group: Renew Europe
- International affiliation: Radical International (historical)
- Colours: Mauve
- National Assembly: 1 / 577
- Senate: 5 / 348
- European Parliament: 0 / 81
- Presidency of Regional Councils: 0 / 17
- Presidency of Departmental Councils: 0 / 95

Website
- parti-radical.fr

The Radical Party (French: Parti radical, pronounced [paʁti ʁadikal]), officially the Republican, Radical and Radical-Socialist Party (Parti républicain, radical et radical-socialiste [paʁti ʁepyblikɛ̃ ʁadikal e ʁadikal sɔsjalist]), is a liberal and social-liberal political party in France. Since 1971, to prevent confusion with the Radical Party of the Left (PRG), it has also been referred to as Parti radical valoisien, after its headquarters on the rue de Valois. The party's name has been variously abbreviated to PRRRS, Rad, PR and PRV. Founded in 1901, the PR is the oldest active political party in France.

Coming from the Radical Republican tradition, the PR upheld the principles of private property, social justice and secularism. The Radicals were originally a left-wing group, but, starting with the emergence of the French Section of the Workers' International (SFIO) in 1905, they shifted gradually towards the centre. In 1926, its right wing split off to form the Unionist (or National) Radicals. In 1971, the party's left wing split off to form the PRG. The PR then affiliated with the centre-right, becoming one of the founder parties of the Union for French Democracy (UDF) in 1978. The party split from the UDF in 2002 in order to become an associate party of the Union for a Popular Movement (UMP). It was later represented on the Liaison Committee for the Presidential Majority prior to launching The Alliance (ARES) in 2011 and the Union of Democrats and Independents (UDI) in 2012. After the 2017 presidential and legislative elections, negotiations to merge the PR and the PRG began. The refounding congress to reunite the parties into the Radical Movement was held in December 2017. However, the union proved short-lived; by 2021, both the PR and PRG returned to being independent parties. The PR since that time has been part of the Ensemble coalition.

== History ==
=== Radicals before the party (1830–1901) ===
After the collapse of Napoleon's empire in 1815, a reactionary Bourbon Restoration took place. The left-wing opposition was constituted by the broad family of Republicans, but these differed over whether and how far to cooperate with liberal-constitutional monarchists in pursuit of their common adversary. In contrast to the Republicans' right wing (then the centre-left of the political spectrum), who were more inclined to accept a socially conservative constitutional monarchy as the first stage to a republic, the Republicans' left wing took a hard line in advocating progressive reforms such as universal manhood suffrage, civil liberties (such as press freedom and right to assembly, among others), and the immediate installation of a republican constitution. They came to be termed Radical Republicans by opposition to the Moderate Republicans.

After the installation of the constitutional July Monarchy (1830–1848), the term Republican was outlawed and the regime's remaining Republican opponents adopted the term Radical for themselves. Following the monarchy's conservative turn, Alexandre Ledru-Rollin and Louis Blanc formulated a Radical doctrine. At this time, radicalism was distinct from and to the left of the July Monarchy's doctrinal liberalism. Radicals defended traditional peasant farmers and small craftsmen against the new rival economic projects of the 19th century, socialist collectivism and capitalist big business alike.

The Radicals took a major part in the 1848 Revolution and the foundation of the Second Republic, sitting in parliament as the Montagne legislative group. Fifty years later, the Radical-Socialist Party would consider this group its direct forefather. For a few months, Alexandre Auguste Ledru-Rollin was Interior Minister in the provisional government. However, the conservatives won the 1848 legislative election, the first election by universal suffrage. The repression of the June 1848 workers' demonstrations disappointed the left-wing supporters of the new regime. Ledru-Rollin obtained only 5% of votes at the December 1848 presidential election, which was won by Louis-Napoléon Bonaparte, who launched a coup, ending parliamentary democracy in favour of a Second Empire.

From opposition, Radicals criticized Bonaparte's autocratic rule and attacks on civil liberties. At the end of the 1860s, they advocated with the Belleville Programme (supported by Léon Gambetta) the election of civil servants and mayors, the proclamation of the so-called "great liberties", free public teaching and the separation of church and state.

After the collapse of the Second French Empire following the 1870 Franco-Prussian War, the Third Republic was proclaimed in September 1870. The first elections in February 1871 returned a majority of monarchists belonging to two distinct factions, conservative-liberal Orléanists and Catholic-traditionalist Legitimists, but these were too divided to reach an agreement over the type of monarchy they wanted to restore. Their division allowed time for the Republicans to win the 1876 elections, leading to the firm establishment of a Republican republic. Like the monarchists, the Republicans were divided into two main factions, namely a centre-left formed of socially-conservative yet liberal and secular Moderate Republicans (pejoratively labeled "Opportunist Republicans") and a far-left of uncompromising anticlerical Radicals. Georges Clemenceau was the leader of the Radical parliamentary group, who criticized colonial policy as a form of diversion from "revenge" against Prussia and due to his ability was a protagonist of the collapse of many governments.

In the 1890s, competition from the growing labour movement and concern for the plight of industrial workers prompted Léon Bourgeois to update the fifty-year-old Radical doctrine to encompass social reforms such as the progressive income tax and social insurance schemes, hence the term Radical-Socialist, a social-democratic synthesis of reformist socialism with traditional radicalism. After the Dreyfus Affair, Radicals joined forces with conservative Republicans and some Socialists in Pierre Waldeck-Rousseau's cabinet (1899–1902). In 1901, an Act on the right of association was voted and the various individual Radicals organised themselves into a political party in order to defend their governmental achievements from the Catholic Church's influence and the traditionalist opposition. However, not all Radicals accepted the change in doctrine and alliance. While retaining their doctrines, those who rejected the new turn towards social-democracy and partnership with the Socialist Party gradually peeled away, labelling themselves the Independent Radicals and sitting in their own loose-knit parliamentary party (Radical Left) to the right of the Radical-Socialists.

The Radical-Socialist and Radical Republican Party was the first large political party established at a national level in France, which contrasted with previous parliamentary groups that were formed spontaneously by likeminded independent lawmakers elected through purely local electoral committees. The first congress of the Radical Party was held in June 1901. Delegates represented 476 election committees, 215 editorial boards of Radical newspapers and 155 Masonic lodges as well as lawmakers, mayors and municipal councillors. However, it was not until 1914 that the Radical-Socialist Party imposed strict discipline on its parliamentary deputies, requiring them to sit exclusively in a single Radical-Socialist legislative caucus.

The existence of a national party immediately changed the political scene. Several Radical independents had already been presidents of the council (Ferdinand Buisson, Emile Combes and Charles Floquet, among others) and the Radicals already benefited from a strong presence across the country. The party was composed of a heterogeneous alliance of personal fiefdoms, informal electoral clubs, masonic lodges and sections of the Ligue des droits de l'homme (Human Rights League) and the Ligue française de l'enseignement (French League of Education, an association dedicated to introducing, expanding and defending free, compulsory and non-religious primary education). The secularising cause was championed by Émile Combes' cabinet start of the 20th century. As the political enemy, they identified the Catholic Church, seen as a political campaign entity for ultra-conservatives and monarchists.

=== Early years: the Radical Republic (1901–1919) ===
At 1902 legislative election, the Radical-Socialists and the Independent Radicals allied themselves with the conservative-liberals of the Democratic Alliance (to their immediate right) and the Socialists (to their left) in the Bloc des gauches (Coalition of the Left), with the Radicals emerging the main political force. Émile Combes took the head of the Bloc des gauches cabinet and led a resolute anti-clerical policy culminating in the 1905 laic law which along with the earlier Jules Ferry laws removing confessional influence from public education formed the backbone of laïcité, France's policy of combatting clericalism by actively excluding it from state institutions. From then on, the Radical-Socialist Party's chief aim in domestic policy was to prevent its wide-ranging set of reforms from being overturned by a return to power of the religious right.

After the withdrawal of the Socialist ministers from the government following the International Socialist Congress of Amsterdam in 1904, the coalition dissolved and the Radicals went alone into the 1906 legislative elections. Nevertheless, the Radical-Socialist Party remained the axis of the parliamentary majorities and of the governments. The cabinet led by the Independent Radical Georges Clemenceau (1906–1909) introduced income tax and workers' pensions, but is also remembered for its violent repression of industrial strikes.

For the latter part of the Third Republic (1918–1940), the Radical-Socialists, generally representing the anti-clerical segment of peasant and petty-bourgeois voters, were usually the largest single party in parliament, but with their anti-clerical agenda accomplished the party lost their driving force. Its leader before World War I Joseph Caillaux was generally more noted for his advocacy of better relations with Germany than for his reformist agenda.

During World War I (1914–1918), the Radical-Socialist Party was the keystone of the Sacred Union while the most prominent Independent Radical Georges Clemenceau led the cabinet again from 1917 to 1919. He appeared as the "architect of victory", but his relationship with the Radical-Socialist Party deteriorated. The Radical-Socialists and the Independent Radicals entered the 1919 legislative election in opposing coalitions, thus Clemenceau's alliance of the right emerged victorious.

=== Between the World Wars (1919–1946) ===
By the end of World War I, the Radical-Socialist Party, now led by Édouard Herriot, were generally a moderate centre-left party faced with the governmental dominance of the socially-conservative liberal parties to its right (see Independent Radicals and Democratic Alliance) and pressure from its left by the rise of support for the socialist French Section of the Workers' International (SFIO) and French Communist Party (PCF). With these political forces, Radical-Socialists shared anti-clericalism and the struggle for "social progress", but unlike the other left parties the Radical-Socialists defended the principle of strict parliamentary action and the defence of private property, at least that of smallholders and small business. Additionally, the Radical-Socialist Party had thought before 1914 that its old adversaries among the Catholic, monarchist and traditionalist right had been weakened once and for all, instead these emerged reinvigorated by World War I.

In 1924, Radical-Socialists formed electoral alliances with the SFIO. The Cartel des Gauches (Coalition of the Left) won the 1924 legislative election and Herriot formed a government. However, the Radical-Socialists gradually drifted to the right, moving from left-Republican governments supported by the non-participating Socialists to a coalition of "Republican concentration" with the centre-right Independent Radicals and the more socially-conservative liberal parties in 1926.

Two years later at the Angers Congress, the left wing of the party obtained the withdrawal of the Radical-Socialists from the cabinet and the return to a policy of alliance with the Socialists. Édouard Daladier was elected party leader. However, a section of the party's right-wing defected to form a second centre-right Independent Radical party (the Social and Radical Left) which opposed alliance with the Socialist Party and preferred close cooperation with the centre-right liberals of the Democratic Alliance.

The party claimed 120,000 members in the 1930s, however, these figures were inflated by competitors purchasing party memberships in bulk to influence inner-party votes.

The second Cartel des gauches won the 1932 legislative election, but its two main components were not able to establish a common agenda and consequently the SFIO chose to support the second government led by Herriot without participation. The coalition fell on 7 February 1934 following riots organized by the far-right leagues the night before. The Radical-Socialist Camille Chautemps's government had been replaced by a government led by his popular rival Édouard Daladier in January after accusations of corruption against Chautemps' government in the wake of the Stavisky Affair and other similar scandals.

This pattern of initial alliance with a socialist party unwilling to join in active government followed by disillusionment and alliance with the centre-right seemed to be broken in 1936, when the Popular Front electoral alliance with the Socialists and the Communists led to the accession of Socialist leader Léon Blum as President of the Council in a coalition government in which the Radical-Socialist leaders Édouard Daladier and Camille Chautemps (representing left and right of the Radical-Socialist Party, respectively) took important roles. For the first time in its history, the Radical-Socialist Party obtained fewer votes than the SFIO.

Over the tempestuous life of the coalition, the Radical-Socialists began to become concerned at the perceived radicalism of their coalition partners. Hence, they opposed themselves to Blum's intention to help the Republicans during the Spanish Civil War (1936–1939), forcing him to adopt a non-interventionist policy. Following the failure of Blum's second government in April 1938, Daladier formed a new government in coalition with the liberal and conservative parties.

After the 29 September 1938 Munich Agreement which handed over Sudetenland to Nazi Germany in exchange for what proved to be a temporary peace, Daladier was acclaimed upon his return to Paris as the man who had avoided war. However, two days after the invasion of Poland on 1 September 1939 the French government led by Daladier made good on its guarantees to Poland by declaring war alongside Britain. Following the 23 August 1939 Molotov–Ribbentrop Pact between Nazi Germany and the Soviet Union, Daladier engaged in an anti-communist policy, prohibiting the Communists activities and the party's newspaper, L'Humanité.

Furthermore, Daladier moved increasingly to the right, notably repealing the 40-hour work week which had been the Popular Front's most visible accomplishment. Daladier would eventually resign in March 1940 and take part in the new government of Paul Reynaud (leader of the main centre-right liberal party, the Democratic Alliance) as minister of National Defense and of War. After the defeat of the Battle of France, the French army being overwhelmed by the Nazi Blitzkrieg, the French government declared Paris an open city on 10 June and flew to Bordeaux. The same month, Daladier escaped to Morocco in the Massilia. Thus, he was not there during the controversial 10 July 1940 vote of full powers to Marshal Philippe Pétain which opened the door to the Vichy regime. Daladier was arrested and tried in 1942 by the new regime (see the Riom Trial) which accused him as well as other political leaders such as Socialist Léon Blum and conservative Paul Reynaud of being morally and strategically responsible for the loss of the Battle of France.

=== Fourth Republic (1946–1958) ===
After World War II, the Radicals, like many of the other political parties, were discredited by the fact that many of their members had voted to grant emergency powers to Marshal Philippe Pétain, although senior Radical leaders as Édouard Herriot, then President of the Chamber of Deputies (the parliamentary Speaker), had been ambivalent.

The Radical-Socialist Party was reconstituted and formed one of the important parties of the Fourth Republic (1946–1958), but never recovered its dominant pre-war position. It failed to prevent the adoption of the projects of the three-parties coalition (nationalizations and the welfare state). Along with Democratic and Socialist Union of the Resistance, it set up an electoral umbrella-group, the Rally of Republican Lefts (RGR). From 1947, after the split of the governmental coalition it participated to the Third Force coalition with the SFIO, the Christian-democratic Popular Republican Movement and the conservative-liberal National Centre of Independents and Peasants.

In the early years of the Fourth Republic, the party returned to the moderate left under the leadership of Pierre Mendès-France, a strong opponent of French colonialism, whose premiership from 1954 to 1955 saw France's withdrawal from Indochina and the agreement for French withdrawal from Tunisia. Mendès-France, a very popular figure who helped renew the Radical-Socialist Party after its discredit, was indeed elected on the pledge to stop Indochina War (1946–1954).

Mendès-France hoped to make the Radicals the party of the mainstream centre-left in France, taking advantage of the difficulties of the SFIO. The more conservative elements in the party led by Edgar Faure resisted these policies, leading to the fall of Mendès-France's government in 1955. They split and transformed the RGR in a centre-right party distinct from the Radical Party. Under Pierre Mendès-France's leadership, the Radical Party participated to a centre-left coalition, the Republican Front, which won the 1956 legislative election. Another split, this time over France's policy about the Algerian War (1954–1962), led to his resignation as party leader and the party's move in a distinctly conservative direction.

The Fourth Republic was characterized by constant parliamentary instability because of divisions between major parties over the Algerian War, which was officially called a "public order operation" until the 1990s. Mendès-France opposed the war and colonialism while the SFIO led by Prime Minister Guy Mollet supported it. Because of the start of the Cold War, all political parties, even the SFIO, opposed the French Communist Party (PCF), which was very popular due to its role during the Resistance (it was known as the parti des 75,000 fusillés, "party of the 75,000 executed people"). The PCF was also opposed to French rule in Algeria and supported its independence.

In the midst of this parliamentary instability and divisions of the political class, Charles de Gaulle took advantage of the May 1958 crisis to return to power. On 13 May, European colonists seized the Governor-General's building in Algiers while Opération Résurrection was launched by the right-wing insurrectionary Comité de Salut Public. De Gaulle, who had deserted the political arena for a decade by disgust over the parliamentary system and its chronic instability (the système des partis which he severely criticized), now appeared as the only man able to reconcile the far-right and the European settlers, which were threatening a coup d'état, with the French Republic. Thus, he was called to power and proclaimed the end of the Fourth Republic (according to him too weak because of its parliamentarism) and replaced it by the Fifth Republic, a hybrid presidential-parliamentary system tailored for himself.

The Radical Party supported de Gaulle at this crucial moment, leading Mendès-France to quit the party. Opposed to the proposed constitution, Mendès-France campaigned for the "no" on 28 September 1958 referendum. However, the new Constitution was finally adopted and proclaimed on 4 October 1958.

=== Fifth Republic (1958–present) ===
Popular figure Pierre Mendès-France quit the Radical Party, which had crossed the threshold to the centre-right, as early moderate Republicans did at the beginning of the Third Republic, when the Radical Party, appearing to their left, pushed them over the border between the left-wing and the right-wing, a process dubbed sinistrisme.

Mendès-France then founded the Centre d'Action Démocratique (CAD), which would later join the Autonomous Socialist Party (PSA, which had split from the SFIO), which in turn fused into the Unified Socialist Party (PSU) on 3 April 1960. This new socialist party gathered all the dissidents from the Radical Party and the SFIO who were opposed to both the Algerian War and the proclamation of the new presidential regime. Mendès-France would officially become a member of the PSU in 1961, a year before the 18 March 1962 Evian Accords which put an end to the Algerian War.

The Radical Party returned from support of the government to opposition in 1959 and declined throughout all the 1960s. Allied with the SFIO in the Federation of the Democratic and Socialist Left, it supported François Mitterrand for the 1965 presidential election. This federation later split in 1968.

Under the leadership of Jean-Jacques Servan-Schreiber, President since 29 October 1969 issued from the left-wing, the party again made tentative moves to the left in the 1970s, but stopped short of an alliance with Socialist Party (PS) leader François Mitterrand and his Communist allies, leading to a final split in 1972 when the remaining centre-left Radicals left the party and eventually became the Movement of the Radical-Socialist Left. This group, which wanted to be a part of the left-wing Common Programme, broke away to create the Movement of the Left Radicals (MRG) and at the 1974 presidential election, supported Mitterrand, the candidate of the left wing.

==== Radical Party valoisien ====
Henceforth, the Radical Party began to be known as valoisien, from the location of its national headquarters at the Place de Valois in Paris, in order to distinguish it from the MRG. Opposed to an electoral alliance with the PCF, which was the foundation of the 1972 Common Programme, the Radicals were still anti-Gaullists. They allied with the Christian Democrats in the Reforming Movement in order to propose another way between the Common Programme's parties and the Presidential Majority led by Gaullists. Finally, they joined it after the election of Valéry Giscard d'Estaing to the presidency of France in 1974. They supported most reforms of Giscard d'Estaing's presidency (in particular the authorization of the contraceptive pill and recognition of women's rights). This evolution brought by Servan-Schreiber's influence would end with the latter's failure during the 1979 European elections.

Following the left-wing scission in 1971, the Radical Party valoisien maintained the judicial rights to the official name of Republican, Radical and Radical-Socialist Party and is its legal continuation.

After the failure of the alliance with the Christians Democrats into the Reforming Movement, the Radical Party maintained its influence by participating in the foundation of Giscard d'Estaing's Union for French Democracy (UDF) in 1978. The Radical Party was one of its six components, along with the centrists of the Centre of Social Democrats, the liberals of the Republican Party and of the National Federation of Perspectives and Realities Clubs, the social democrats of the Socialist-Democratic Movement and of the new members of the UDF. Through the UDF, the Radical Party participated to all of the governments issued from parliamentary majorities of the Rally for the Republic (RPR).

==== Associate party of the UMP ====
An important split took place after the 1998 regional elections, during which some members of the party composed electoral alliances with the far-right National Front party. Those members created the Liberal Democratic Party while the Radical Party remained a member of the UDF. During the 2002 presidential election, François Bayrou presented himself as a candidate for the UDF while the Radical Party supported his rival Jacques Chirac (RPR).

After Chirac's re-election in 2002, most radicals participated to the creation of his new party, the Union for a Popular Movement (UMP). The Radical Party then quit the UDF to associate itself with the UMP, sharing its memberships and budget with the latter. However, some members such as Thierry Cornillet continue to be part of UDF. It was then headed by Jean-Louis Borloo and André Rossinot.

After the rise of Nicolas Sarkozy to the leadership of the UMP, Radicals launched a sort of re-foundation of their party in order to create a counterbalancing moderate and social wing within the UMP. The party soon started to attract other centrists (as Jean-Louis Borloo, Renaud Dutreil, Véronique Mathieu and Françoise Hostalier) and even some anti-Sarkozy neo-Gaullists (as Serge Lepeltier and Alain Ferry). As a result, the Radical Party had a comeback in French politics. It then had 21 deputies (four more from those elected in 2002), 6 senators (two more from 2002), 4 MEPs and 8,000 members. Jean-Louis Borloo was a high-ranking minister in François Fillon's second government as Minister of Ecology, Energy, Sustainable Development and Transport and Minister of State from 2007 to 2010, when he chose not take part to Fillon's third government. It was the first time since 1974 that Radicals were not represented in a centre-right government.

During the 7th term of the European Parliament, three Radical MEPs sat with the European People's Party Group (EPP) along with the UMP.

==== The Alliance ====
Former logo (before 2017)

On 7 April 2011, Borloo announced the creation of a centrist coalition. During a party congress on 14–15 May, the Radicals decided to cut their ties with Sarkozy's Union for a Popular Movement (UMP), of which they had been an associate party since 2002. During a convention on 26 June, the party officially joined The Alliance (ARES) alongside New Centre and other centrist parties as an alternative to the UMP. The Alliance was replaced with the Union of Democrats and Independents (UDI) in September 2012.

During the 8th European Parliament, the single Radical MEP Dominique Riquet sat with the Alliance of Liberals and Democrats for Europe (ALDE) group as part of the UDI.

== Elected officials ==
- Deputies: Alfred Almont (Martinique), Edwige Antier (Paris), Paul Aubry (Haut-Marne), Jean-Louis Bernard (Loiret), Jean-Louis Borloo (Nord), Claire Bouchet (Hautes-Alpes), Alain Ferry (Bas-Rhin), Jean Grenet (Pyrénées-Atlantiques), Laurent Hénart (Meurthe-et-Moselle), Françoise Hostalier (Nord), Yves Jégo (Seine-et-Marne), Robert Lecou (Hérault), Jean Leonetti (Alpes-Maritimes), François Loos (Bas-Rhin), Alain Marc (Aveyron), Franck Marlin (Essonne), Frédéric Reiss (Bas-Rhin), Franck Reynier (Drôme), Arnaud Richard (Yvelines), François Scellier (Val-d'Oise), Pierre Souquès (Indre-et-Loire), André Wojciechowski (Moselle), Michel Zumkeller (Territoire de Belfort)
- Senators: Jean-Paul Alduy (Pyrénées-Orientales), Alain Chatillon (Haute-Garonnne), Sylvie Goy-Chavent (Ain), Pierre Jarlier (Cantal), Sophie Joissains (Bouches-du-Rhône), Aymeri de Montesquiou (Gers)
- MEPs: Dominique Riquet (Nord-Ouest)

== Leadership ==
Party presidents:

- Gustave Mesureur (1901–1902)
- Jean Dubief (1902–1903)
- Maurice Fauré (1903–1904)
- Maurice Berteaux (1904–1905)
- Émile Combes (1905–1906)
- Camille Pelletan (1906–1907)
- Auguste Delpech (1907–1908)
- Louis Lafferre (1908–1909)
- Ernest Vallé (1909–1910)
- Émile Combes (1910–1913)
- Joseph Caillaux (1913–1917)
- Charles Debierre (1917–1918)
- André Renard (1918–1919)
- Édouard Herriot (1919–1920)
- Maurice Sarraut (1920–1927)
- Édouard Daladier (1927–1931)
- Édouard Herriot (1931–1936)
- Édouard Daladier (1936–1944)
- Édouard Herriot (1944–1957)
- Édouard Daladier (1957–1958)
- Félix Gaillard (1958–1961)
- Maurice Faure (1961–1965)
- René Billères (1965–1969)
- Maurice Faure (1969–1971)
- Jean-Jacques Servan-Schreiber (1971–1975)
- Gabriel Péronnet (1975–1977)
- Jean-Jacques Servan-Schreiber (1977–1979)
- Didier Bariani (1979–1983)
- André Rossinot (1983–1988)
- Yves Galland (1988–1993)
- André Rossinot (1993–1997)
- Thierry Cornillet (1997–1999)
- François Loos (1999–2003)
- André Rossinot (2003–2005)
- Jean-Louis Borloo and André Rossinot (co-presidents, 2005–2007)
- Jean-Louis Borloo (2007–2014)
- Laurent Hénart (2014–2024)
- Nathalie Delattre (since 2024)

== Election results ==
=== National Assembly ===
Date	Leader	Votes				Seats			Position
Date	Leader	First round	%	Second round	%	#	±	Size	Position
1902	Émile Combes	853,140	10.14	–	–	104 / 589	▲30	3rd	Coalition
1906	Émile Combes	2,514,508	28.53	–	–	132 / 585	▲28	1st	Coalition
1910	Émile Combes	1,727,064	20.45	–	–	148 / 587	▲16	1st	Coalition
1914	Joseph Caillaux	1,530,188	18.15	–	–	140 / 592	▼8	1st	Coalition
1919	Édouard Herriot	1,420,381	17.43	–	–	86 / 616	▼54	2nd	Coalition
1919	Part of coalition with the Republican-Socialist Party, which won 106 seats in total								
1924	Édouard Herriot	1,612,581	17.86	–	–	139 / 584	▲53	2nd	Coalition
1924	Part of coalition with the Republican-Socialist Party, which won 167 seats in total								
1928	Édouard Daladier	1,682,543	17.77	–	–	120 / 602	▼19	3rd	Coalition
1932	Édouard Herriot	1,836,991	19.18	–	–	157 / 605	▲37	1st	Coalition
1936	Édouard Daladier	1,422,611	14.45	–	–	111 / 612	▼46	3rd	Coalition
1945	Édouard Herriot	2,018,665	10.54	–	–	60 / 586	▼51	5th	Coalition
I 1946	Édouard Herriot	2,295,119	11.54	–	–	39 / 522	▼31	5th	Opposition
II 1946	Édouard Herriot	2,381,385	12.40	–	–	55 / 544	▲16	5th	Opposition
1951	Édouard Herriot	1,887,583	11.13	–	–	67 / 544	▲12	6th	Coalition
1951	Part of the Rally of Republican Lefts, which won 77 seats in total								
1956	Édouard Herriot	2,381,385	12.40	–	–	54 / 544	▼13	5th	Coalition
1958	Félix Gaillard	2,695,287	13.15	1,398,409	7.77	37 / 576	▼17	5th	Coalition
1962	Maurice Faure	1,429,649	7.8	1,172,711	7.69	42 / 485	▲5	3rd	Opposition
1967	René Billères	4,207,166	18.79	4,505,329	24.08	24 / 487	▼18	2nd	Opposition
1967	Part of the Federation of the Democratic and Socialist Left, which won 118 seats in total								
1968	René Billères	3,660,250	16.53	3,097,338	21.25	15 / 487	▼9	2nd	Opposition
1968	Part of the Federation of the Democratic and Socialist Left, which won 57 seats in total								
1973	JJ Servan-Schreiber	2,967,481	12.51	1,631,978	6.96	4 / 490	▼11	4th	Opposition
1973	Part of the Reformist Movement, which won 32 seats in total								
1978	JJ Servan-Schreiber	6,128,849	21.46	5,907,603	23.19	9 / 491	▲5	2nd	Coalition
1978	Part of the Union for French Democracy, which won 124 seats in total								
1981	Didier Bariani	4,827,437	19.20	3,489,363	18.68	2 / 491	▼6	3rd	Opposition
1981	Part of the Union for French Democracy, which won 61 seats in total								
1986	André Rossinot	2,330,072	8.31	–	–	7 / 577	▲5	4th	Coalition
1986	Part of the Union for French Democracy, which won 53 seats in total								
1988	André Rossinot	4,519,459	18.50	4,299,370	21.18	3 / 577	▼4	4th	Opposition
1988	Part of the Union for French Democracy, which won 130 seats in total								
1993	Yves Galland	4,855,274	19.08	5,331,935	25.84	14 / 577	▲11	2nd	Coalition
1993	Part of the Union for French Democracy, which won 213 seats in total								
1997	André Rossinot	3,601,279	14.21	5,323,177	20.77	3 / 577	▼11	3rd	Opposition
1997	Part of the Union for French Democracy, which won 112 seats in total								
2002	François Loos	8,408,023	33.30	10,029,669	47.26	9 / 577	▲6	1st	Coalition
2002	Part of the Union for a Popular Movement, which won 357 seats in total								
2007	Jean-Louis Borloo	10,289,737	39.54	9,460,710	46.36	16 / 577	▲7	1st	Coalition
2007	Part of the Union for a Popular Movement, which won 313 seats in total								
2012	Jean-Louis Borloo	321,124	1.24	311,199	1.35	6 / 577	▼10	9th	Opposition
2017	Laurent Hénart	687,225	3.03	551,784	3.04	3 / 577	▼3	5th	Coalition
2017	Part of the Union of Democrats and Independents, which won 18 seats in total								
2022	Laurent Hénart	5,857,364	25.75	8,002,419	38.57	5 / 577	▲2	1st	Coalition
2022	Part of Ensemble, which won 245 seats in total								
2024	Laurent Hénart	6,820,446	21.28	6,691,619	24.53	1 / 577	▼4	2nd	Coalition
2024	Part of Ensemble, which won 159 seats in total								

=== European Parliament ===
Election	Leader	Votes	%	Seats	+/−	EP Group
2024 (Note: Run as part of the Ensemble coalition.)	Laurent Hénart	3,589,114	14.56 (#2)	0 / 81	New	−

== See also ==
- French Left
- Liberalism and radicalism in France
- French Republican Left (1871–1885)
