= François Loos =

French politician

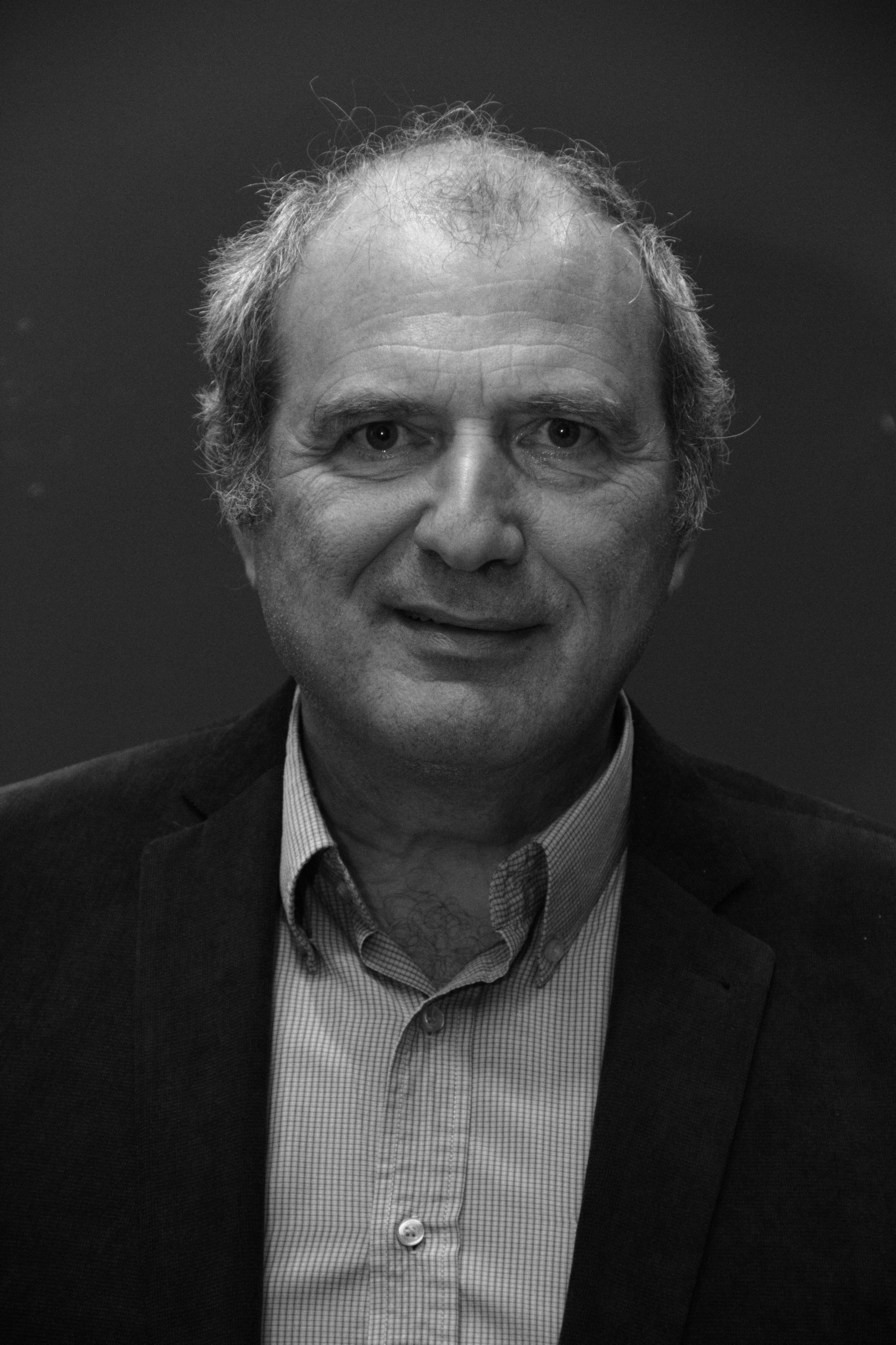

Member of the National Assembly for Bas-Rhin
- In office 2007–2011
- Preceded by: Bernard Schreiner
- Succeeded by: Claude Sturni

Personal details
- Born: 24 December 1953 (age 72) Strasbourg, France
- Party: UDI
- Education: École Polytechnique; Mines ParisTech

François Loos (born 24 December 1953) was appointed Minister Delegate for Industry on 2 June 2005, following a term as Minister Delegate for Foreign Trade (June 2002 to May 2005). He was Minister Delegate for Higher Education & Research in the first Raffarin government.

François Loos is a graduate from the Ecole Polytechnique, the prestigious state-run industrial and engineering school and has an engineering diploma from the Ecole des Mines. He also holds a postgraduate diploma (diplôme d'études approfondies – DEA) in mathematics.

After starting his career as an engineer with various firms in France and Germany, François Loos became a technical advisor to Pierre Pflimlin, President of the European Parliament (1984), and subsequently to Hubert Curien, French Minister of Research & Technology (1984–1985). He next joined Rhône Poulenc as Managing Director of the Thann plant, which he ran for two years before being appointed Executive Secretary for Research (1987–1989). From 1990 to 1993, he was Chief Executive of the Lohr SA group.

In 1992 François Loos was elected Conseiller Régional (regional government representative) for the Alsace region and deputy of the Bas-Rhin département in 1993. He has been Vice-Chairman of the Conseil Régional (regional government) of Alsace since 1996. He was re-elected as a deputy in 1997 and again on 9 June 2002 (after the first election round). He chaired the Parliamentary Board of Enquiry into Industrial Hazards in France following the Toulouse disaster in 2001.

In 1994 and 1995 he was the Deputy General Secretary of the Parti Radical Valoisien, a centre-right political party. He was then promoted to National Secretary and in 1997 to National Delegate for International Affairs, followed by a term as party chairman from 1999 to October 2003. He is a founding member and a member of the political bureau of the Union for a Popular Movement, a right-wing political party.
