= Paul Aubry =

French politician

Paul Aubry (14 February 1902, Chaumont, Haute-Marne – 2 June 1998) was a French politician. He represented the Radical Party in the National Assembly from 1951 to 1955.
