= Jean Delobel =

French politician

Deputy for Nord's 15th constituency in the National Assembly of France
- In office 1997–2007
- Preceded by: Marie-Fanny Gournay (RPR)
- Succeeded by: Françoise Hostalier (UMP)

Personal details
- Born: 31 January 1933; Armentières, Nord, France
- Died: 10 May 2013 (aged 80); Bailleul, Nord, France
- Political party: Socialist Party

Jean Delobel (31 January 1933 – 10 May 2013) was a French politician. He served as a member of the National Assembly from 1997 to 2007, representing Nord.
