= Jennifer de Temmerman =

French politician

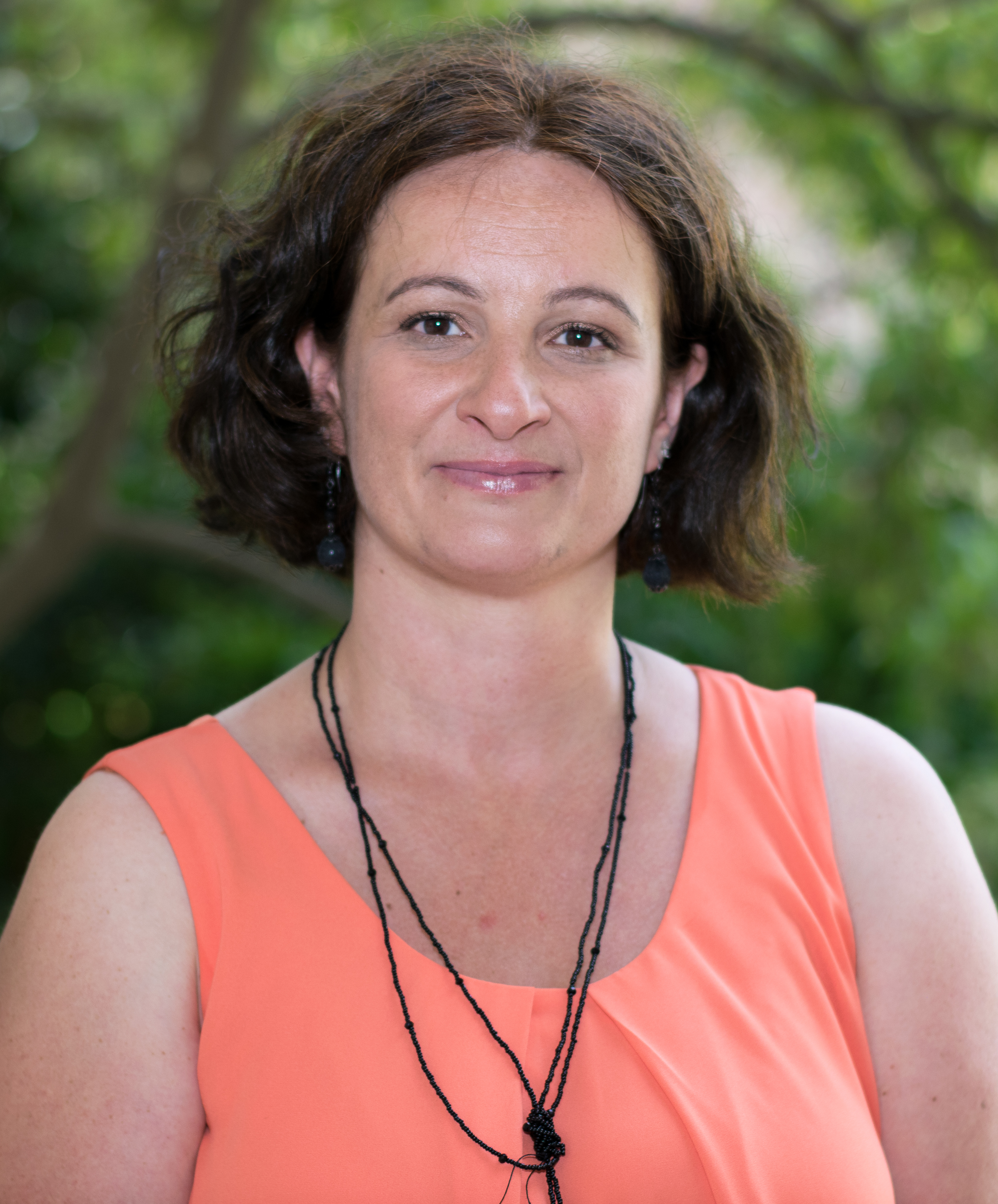

Member of the National Assembly for Nord's 15th constituency
- In office 21 June 2017 – 21 June 2022
- Preceded by: Jean-Pierre Allossery
- Succeeded by: Pierrick Berteloot

Personal details
- Born: 16 February 1977 (age 49) Valenciennes, France
- Party: LREM (2017–2019); EDS (2020); Liberties and Territories (2020-)
- Education: Charles de Gaulle University – Lille III

Jennifer de Temmerman (born 16 February 1977) is a French politician who served as a member of the French National Assembly from 2017 to 2022, where she represented the 15th constituency of the Nord.

== Early life and education ==
Born 16 February 1977 in Valenciennes, de Temmerman grew up in a former "coron" of Anzin, before moving to Aulnoy-lez-Valenciennes.

De Temmerman was first apprenticed in bookstores in parallel with her university studies in Classics at the Charles de Gaulle University – Lille III. After obtaining her CAPES, she taught in classical letters for twelve years.

== Member of the National Assembly ==
On 18 June 2017, de Temmerman was elected in the 15th constituency of the Nord by obtaining 60.76% of votes in the second round against the FN's candidate.

In parliament, de Temmerman served on the Committee on Sustainable Development.

In addition to her committee assignments, de Temmerman was a member of the French delegation to the Parliamentary Assembly of the Council of Europe from 2017 to 2022. In this capacity, she served on the Committee on Social Affairs, Health and Sustainable Development; the Sub-Committee on Public Health and Sustainable Development; and the Sub-Committee on the European Social Charter. She was also the Assembly's rapporteur on the implementation of the Sustainable Development Goals (SDGs).

In November 2019, de Temmerman left the LREM group to join the non-subscribers, evoking the "culmination of a process". She said she had questioned "on the meaning of [her] belonging to La République En Marche since the departure of Nicolas Hulot from the government", and had "a click" while speaking to the Assembly, without having premeditated, against an amendment, tabled by surprise, reducing by 15 million euros the budget of state medical aid. In May 2020, she was one of the 17 initial members of the short-lived Ecology Democracy Solidarity group in the National Assembly, but left shortly after to become part of the Liberties and Territories group.

== Political positions ==
In April 2018, de Temmerman joined other co-signatories around Sébastien Nadot in officially filing a request for a commission of inquiry into the legality of French weapons sales to the Saudi-led coalition fighting in Yemen, days before an official visit of Saudi Crown Prince Mohammed bin Salman to Paris.

In September 2018, following the appointment of François de Rugy to the government, de Temmerman supported the candidacy of Barbara Pompili as president of the National Assembly.

In 2019, de Temmerman joined an international group of parliamentarians in a joint call for a body to strengthen the democratic representation of the world's citizens in global affairs and the UN's decision-making.

In July 2019, de Temmerman decided not to align with her parliamentary group's majority and became one of 52 LREM members who abstained from a vote on the French ratification of the European Union’s Comprehensive Economic and Trade Agreement (CETA) with Canada.

In November 2019, de Temmerman denounced the government's new immigration plan and declared in the National Assembly: "Are we going this morning, I tell you, to complete humanism? ". She co-signed a platform with ten other LREM deputies to oppose the government's measures on immigration concerning health and especially state medical aid (AME), pleading not to give in to urgency and ease ».

== See also ==
- 2017 French legislative election
