= Hôtel de Ville, Bailleul =

Town hall in Bailleul, Nord, France

Hôtel de Ville
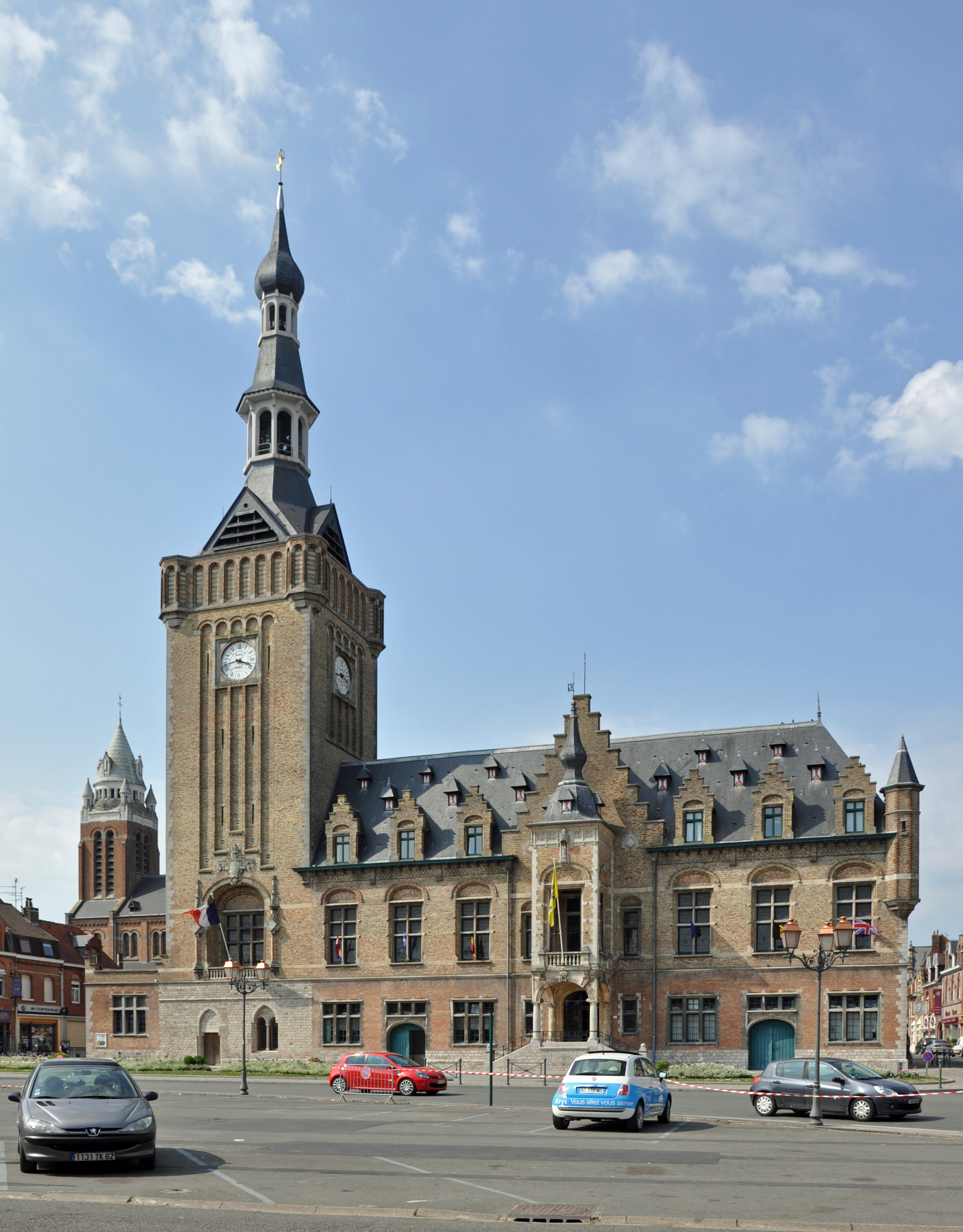
- The main frontage of the Hôtel de Ville in April 2011

General information
- Type: City hall
- Architectural style: Flemish Renaissance Revival style
- Location: Bailleul, France
- Coordinates: 50.7399°N 2.7348°E
- Completed: 1932

Height
- Height: 62 metres (203 ft)

Design and construction
- Architects: Louis Marie Cordonnier

UNESCO World Heritage Site
- Part of: Belfries of Belgium and France
- Criteria: Cultural: ii, iv
- Reference: 943
- Inscription: 1999 (23rd Session)

Monument historique
- Official name: Hôtel de ville
- Type: Inscrit
- Designated: 1922
- Reference no.: PA00107358

The Hôtel de Ville (French pronunciation: [otɛl də vil], City Hall) is a municipal building in Bailleul, Nord, in northern France, standing on Place Charles de Gaulle. It was designated a monument historique by the French government in 1922.

== History ==
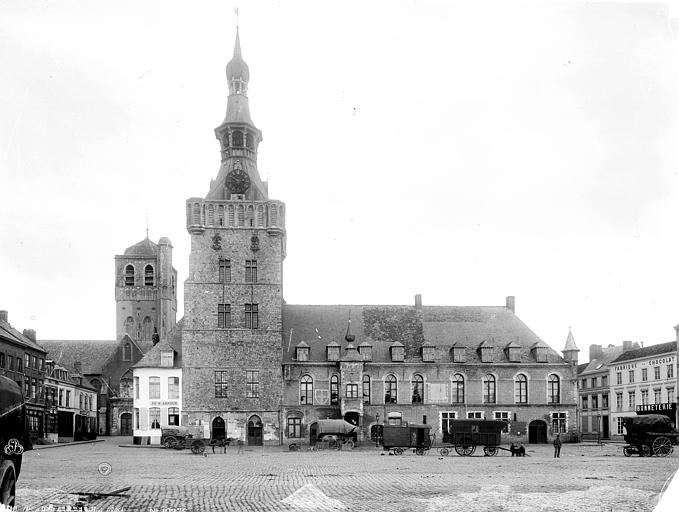
The building in the late 19th century

The first town hall, which consisted of a simple wooden tower, dated back to the 12th century. It was rebuilt in stone with a gothic-style main hall in the 13th century. Following the pillaging of the town by the troops of Richard of York, 3rd Duke of York in 1436 during the Hundred Years' War, the upper stages of the complex were comprehensively restored. After a fire which started in a brewery on Rue d'Ypres in 1681, it was restored again.

The complex was laid out with a four-stage tower at the southwest end of a main hall. The tower featured a pair of arched openings in the first stage and pairs of cross-windows in each of the upper stages. It was surmounted by machicolations and a bulbous belfry featuring a depiction of the mermaid, Melusine, at the apex. The design of the main hall involved an asymmetrical main frontage of nine bays facing onto the square. The third bay on the left featured a full height bretèche which was surmounted by a bulbous spire. The other bays were fenestrated by cross-windows on the ground floor, by round headed windows on the first floor and by dormer windows at attic level, and there was a bartizan at the southeast corner.

On 13 April 1918, during the Battle of the Lys, part of the First World War, the town hall was destroyed by artillery fire as German troops advanced on the town. Although the town was recaptured by the allies in late August 1918, much of the town, including the town hall, lay in ruins.

After the war, the council decided to rebuild the town hall on the same site. The building was designed by Louis Marie Cordonnier in the Flemish Renaissance Revival style, built in brown brick and was completed in 1932. The design of the main hall broadly replicated the design of the original main hall except the bretèche was moved to the central bay and a stepped gable was installed behind it. Meanwhile, the scale and massing of the tower was increased giving it a revised height of 62 metres (203 ft).

In 2005, the belfry was added to the UNESCO World Heritage List as part of the Belfries of Belgium and France site because of its architecture and historical importance in maintaining municipal power in Europe.
