= Jean-Paul Delevoye =

French politician

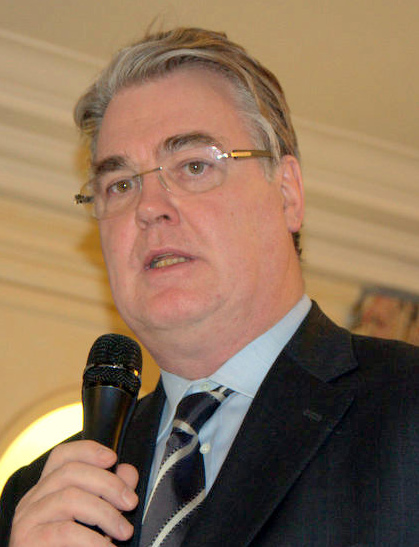

High commissioner to Pensions
- In office 3 September 2019 – 16 December 2019
- President: Emmanuel Macron
- Prime Minister: Édouard Philippe
- Succeeded by: Laurent Pietraszewski

Mediator of the French Republic
- In office 2004–2011
- President: Jacques Chirac; Nicolas Sarkozy
- Preceded by: Bernard Stasi
- Succeeded by: Dominique Baudis

Minister of Civil Service
- In office 7 May 2002 – 30 March 2004
- President: Jacques Chirac
- Prime Minister: Jean-Pierre Raffarin
- Preceded by: Michel Sapin
- Succeeded by: Renaud Dutreil

Personal details
- Born: 22 January 1947 (age 79) Bapaume, France
- Party: UMP (before 2015); The Republicans (2015–2017); En Marche! (2017–present)

Jean-Paul Delevoye (born 22 January 1947) is a French politician.

== Political career ==
After having worked in the food industry, he began his political career as a village councilman in 1974. Since 1982, he is the mayor of Bapaume, a small town in northern France (except between 2002 and 2004).

Between 1992 and 2002, he was president of the French mayors association and a Senator of the Pas-de-Calais départment, before being promoted to Minister of the Civil Service. After two years in the French government, he was appointed the Mediator of the French Republic (Médiateur de la République), his term of office ending in 2010.

From 2010 to 2015, Delevoye was the head of the French Economic, Social and Environmental Council.

Since 14 September 2017, he was High commissioner in charge of the French pension system reform.

On 3 September 2019, he became delegate minister in charge of the pension reform, under supervision of Agnès Buzyn, minister for Solidarity and Health in the Philippe government.

It was revealed by the Le Parisien in December 2019, then by Le Monde and Capital, that he forgot to indicate to the HATVP several functions he had in various organisms, some of them paid and illegal under the French constitution, and including some which could be a Conflict of interest with his role in the government.

On 19 December 2019, the HATVP informed the Tribunal de grande instance de Paris which began a formal investigation.

Under pressure, he resigned from his government position on 16 December 2019.
