= Jardin des Plantes Sauvages du Conservatoire botanique national de Bailleul =

Garden in Bailleul, France

Coordinates: 50°44′48″N 2°45′11″E

The Jardin des Plantes Sauvages du Conservatoire botanique national de Bailleul (1 hectare) is a garden of protected local plants maintained by the Conservatoire botanique national de Bailleul in Haendries, northwest of Bailleul, Nord, Nord-Pas-de-Calais, in France. It is open weekdays in the warmer months; an admission fee is charged.

The conservatory was established in 1970, designated the Conservatoire botanique national de Bailleul in 1991, and in 2003 opened its Jardin des Plantes Sauvages to preserve endangered and protected plants of northwestern France, and to educate the public on their importance. Today the garden contains over 850 local plant species.

== See also ==
- List of botanical gardens in France
