= Florence Morlighem =

French politician

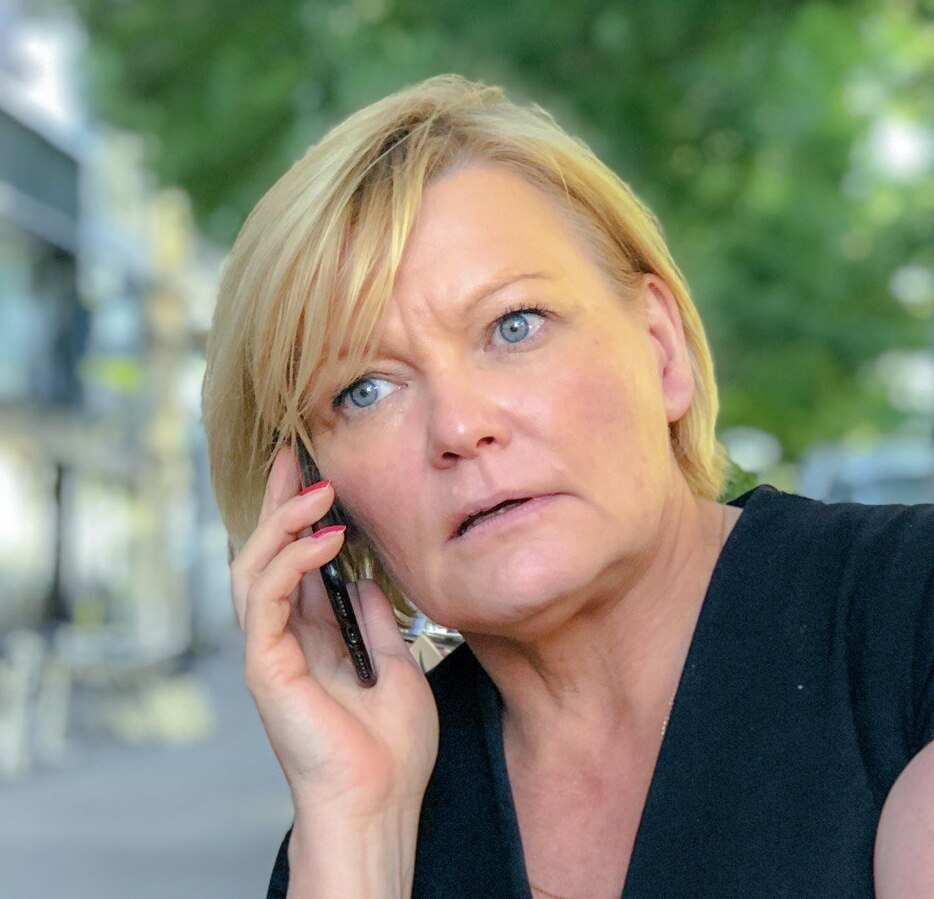

Member of the National Assembly for Nord's 11th constituency
- In office 18 January 2020 – 20 June 2022
- Preceded by: Laurent Pietraszewski
- Succeeded by: Roger Vicot

Personal details
- Born: 10 April 1970 (age 55) Roubaix, France
- Party: La République En Marche!

Florence Morlighem (born 10 April 1970) is a French politician who was Member of Parliament for Nord's 11th constituency from 2020 to 2022.

== Political career ==
She was a substitute in the 2017 election.

== See also ==
- Women in the French National Assembly
