= Marie-Fanny Gournay =

French politician (1926–2020)

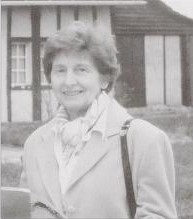

Mayor of Caëstre
- In office 21 March 1971 – 18 March 2001
- Preceded by: Michel Ramon
- Succeeded by: Yves Baron

General Councillor of the Canton of Hazebrouck
- In office 25 March 1979 – 21 March 1998
- Preceded by: Amand Moriss
- Succeeded by: Jean-Pierre Laczny

France Senator of Nord
- In office 15 January 1990 – 27 September 1992
- Succeeded by: Pierre Carous

Deputy of Nord's 15th constituency
- In office 28 March 1993 – 21 April 1997
- Preceded by: Maurice Sergheraert
- Succeeded by: Jean Delobel

Personal details
- Born: 6 March 1926 Hazebrouck, France
- Died: 4 February 2020 (aged 93) Caëstre, France
- Party: Rally for the Republic
- Occupation: Politician

Marie-Fanny Gournay (6 March 1926 – 4 February 2020) was a French politician.

Born as Marie Fanny Zoé Lucienne Demey in Hazebrouck, she spent the majority of her personal and professional life rooted in the French Flanders region. She died in Caëstre at the age of 93
