= Pierrick Berteloot =

French politician

Member of the National Assembly for Nord's 15th constituency
- In office 22 June 2022 – 22 June 2024
- Preceded by: Jennifer de Temmerman
- Succeeded by: Jean-Pierre Bataille

Personal details
- Born: 11 January 1999 (age 27) Dunkirk, France
- Party: National Rally
- Occupation: Sailor, politician

Pierrick Berteloot (born 11 January 1999 in Dunkirk) is a French politician of the National Rally. He was the deputy for Nord's 15th constituency in the National Assembly from 2022 to 2024.

== Biography ==
=== Early life ===
Berteloot was born and raised in Dunkirk. He is the great-grandson of French resistance fighter Louis Maniez who was executed by Nazi forces in 1944 and has a bridge named after him in Bourbourg. After secondary school, Berteloot became a sailor based in various countries including the United States for DFDS and attended the L'Ecole Maritime de Boulogne maritime academy in Boulogne-sur-Mer. He was then an employee of a ferry company operating between France and England. He later returned to the L'Ecole Maritime de Boulogne to train as a bridge watch officer but chose to enter politics instead.

=== Political career ===
In 2020, he was elected as a municipal councilor in Bourbourg for the National Rally and became a delegate for overseeing military and patriotic ceremonies in this capacity. In 2021, he became a regional councilor in Hauts-de-France on a list headed by Sébastien Chenu.

For the 2022 French legislative election, Berteloot contested the constituency of Nord's 15th. He won the seat in the second round, defeating EELV and NUPES affiliated candidate Emilie Ducourant.

Berteloot is openly gay and in interviews ahead of the legislative election stated that his experiences with homophobic bullying in school shaped his decision to get involved in politics. In an interview with Le Monde he said that he would not have joined the FN under the leadership of Jean-Marie Le Pen and would use position in politics to advance LGBT causes, but agreed with the FN's stance on immigration and supports efforts to stop illegal immigration into France. He has also said defending local farmers would be a core priority during his time in the National Assembly. In parliament, he sat as a member of the defense committee. Damien Top was employed as his parliamentary attaché.

Berteloot lost to Jean-Pierre Bataille in the 2024 election.
