= Roger Vicot =

French politician

Member of the National Assembly for the Nord's 11th constituency
- Incumbent
- Assumed office 22 June 2022
- Preceded by: Florence Morlighem

Personal details
- Born: 1 June 1963 (age 63) Denain, France
- Party: Socialist Party
- Other political affiliations: NUPES

Roger Vicot (French: [ʁɔʒe viko]; born 1 June 1963) is a French politician of the Socialist Party who has been representing Nord's 11th constituency in the National Assembly since 2022.

== Political career ==
Vicot defeated Laurent Pietraszewski from En Marche.

In 2023, Vicot publicly endorsed the re-election of the Socialist Party's chairman Olivier Faure.

== See also ==
- List of deputies of the 16th National Assembly of France
