= Jean-Pierre Bataille =

French politician (born 1963)

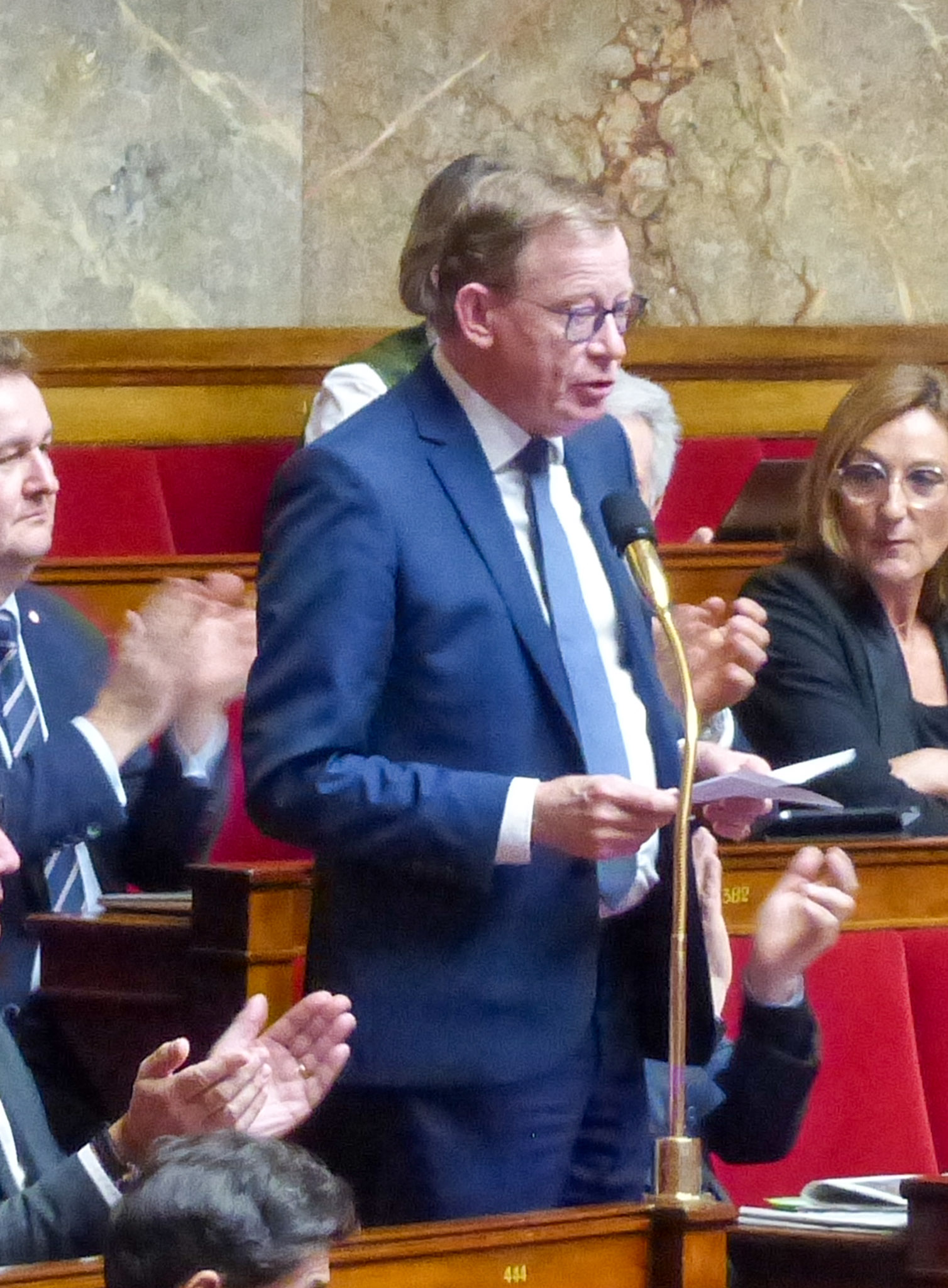

Member of the National Assembly for Nord's 15th constituency
- Incumbent
- Assumed office 8 July 2024
- Preceded by: Pierrick Berteloot

Personal details
- Born: 24 October 1963 (age 62) Hazebrouck, France
- Party: Miscellaneous right

Jean-Pierre Bataille (born 24 October 1963) is a French politician. He has been mayor of Steenvoorde since 1999, succeeding his father Jean-Paul Bataille. He has also been a regional councilor since 2004. In 2024, he was elected deputy for Nord's 15th constituency.

== Biography ==
Jean-Pierre Bataille was born on 24 October 1963 in Hazebrouck. He is the son of Jean-Paul Bataille, pharmacist, senator and mayor of Steenvoorde from 1965 until his death in 1999.

== Political career ==
After his father's death in 1999, Jean-Pierre Bataille succeeded him as mayor of Steenvoorde. He was then elected president of the community of communes of pays des géants, then of the community of communes of Inner Flanders. He was a substitute deputy for the Nord's 14th constituency from 2002 to 2012, and regional councilor for Nord-Pas-de-Calais and then Hauts-de-France since 2004. He failed to become deputy for the Nord's 15th constituency in 2012 and 2017. He was finally elected deputy for this same constituency on 7 July 2024.

== Mandates ==
=== Parliament ===
- 2024: députy of Nord's 15th constituency

=== Local ===
- 1999: mayor of Steenvoorde
- 2004: regional councilor of Nord-Pas-de-Calais then Hauts-de-France

=== Political functions ===
- 2023: vice-president of the Hauts-de-France regional council in charge of finance, evaluation of public policies and security
