= Françoise Hostalier =

French politician

Deputy for Nord's 15th constituency in the National Assembly of France
- In office 2002–2012
- Preceded by: Jean Delobel (PS)
- Succeeded by: Jean-Pierre Allossery (PS)

Personal details
- Born: August 19, 1953 (age 72) Beauvais, Oise
- Party: UMP

Françoise Hostalier (born August 19, 1953 in Beauvais, Oise) was a member of the National Assembly of France. She represented Nord's 15th constituency from 2002 to 2012. She campaigned for François Fillon in the first round of the 2017 French presidential election, and supported Marine Le Pen in the second round.

== Biography ==
Françoise Hostalier holds a master's degree in mathematics and was a certified professor of mathematics from 1976 until 1993. After having been an Inspector of the Paris Academy from 1996 to January 2000, she was Inspector General of National Education ( IGEN) in the School and School Life group until 2016. She has been Honorary Inspector General of National Education since October 2016.

She joined the Republican Party in 1981 and became a deputy for the Nord department from 1993 to 1995. In 1995, she became Secretary of State responsible for School Education to the Minister of National Education in the first government of Alain Juppé. She was a member of the national office of the PPDF (chaired by Hervé de Charette) and vice-president of Liberal Democracy (created and chaired by Alain Madelin). After the dissolution of Liberal Democracy, she joined the Valois Radical Party, chaired by André Rossinot, and was a member of the National Office. She is a member of the Political Bureau of the Union for a Popular Movement and the National Secretary for Human Rights. Locally, she is vice-president of the UMP federation in the Nord department.

In 2007, she again became a UMP deputy in the fifteenth constituency of the North with 51.87% of the vote against the socialist candidate Françoise Polnecq. A member of the National Defense and Armed Forces Commission, she is particularly interested in the issue of OPEX (external operations) and the situation in Afghanistan, Chad and Côte d'Ivoire.

She was beaten by the PS candidate Jean-Pierre Allossery during the legislative elections of 2012. Member of the association of former deputies, she supported the candidacy of François Fillon for the presidency of the UMP during the congress of autumn 2012.

During the 2017 presidential campaign, she was the coordinator of François Fillon's campaign in the North. After elimination at the end of the first round, she refused the "republican front" and declared to vote Marine Le Pen in the second round against Emmanuel Macron.

She supported the candidacy of Laurent Wauquiez and later Christian Jacob for the presidency of the Republicans. She was elected National Councilor of the Republicans and member of the Northern Federal Office.
