= Pierre Souquès =

French politician

Pierre Souquès (2 January 1910, Paris - 10 April 2007) was a French politician. He represented the Radical Party in the National Assembly from 1951 to 1958.
