= Bailleul, Nord =

Bailleul Belle
- Commune
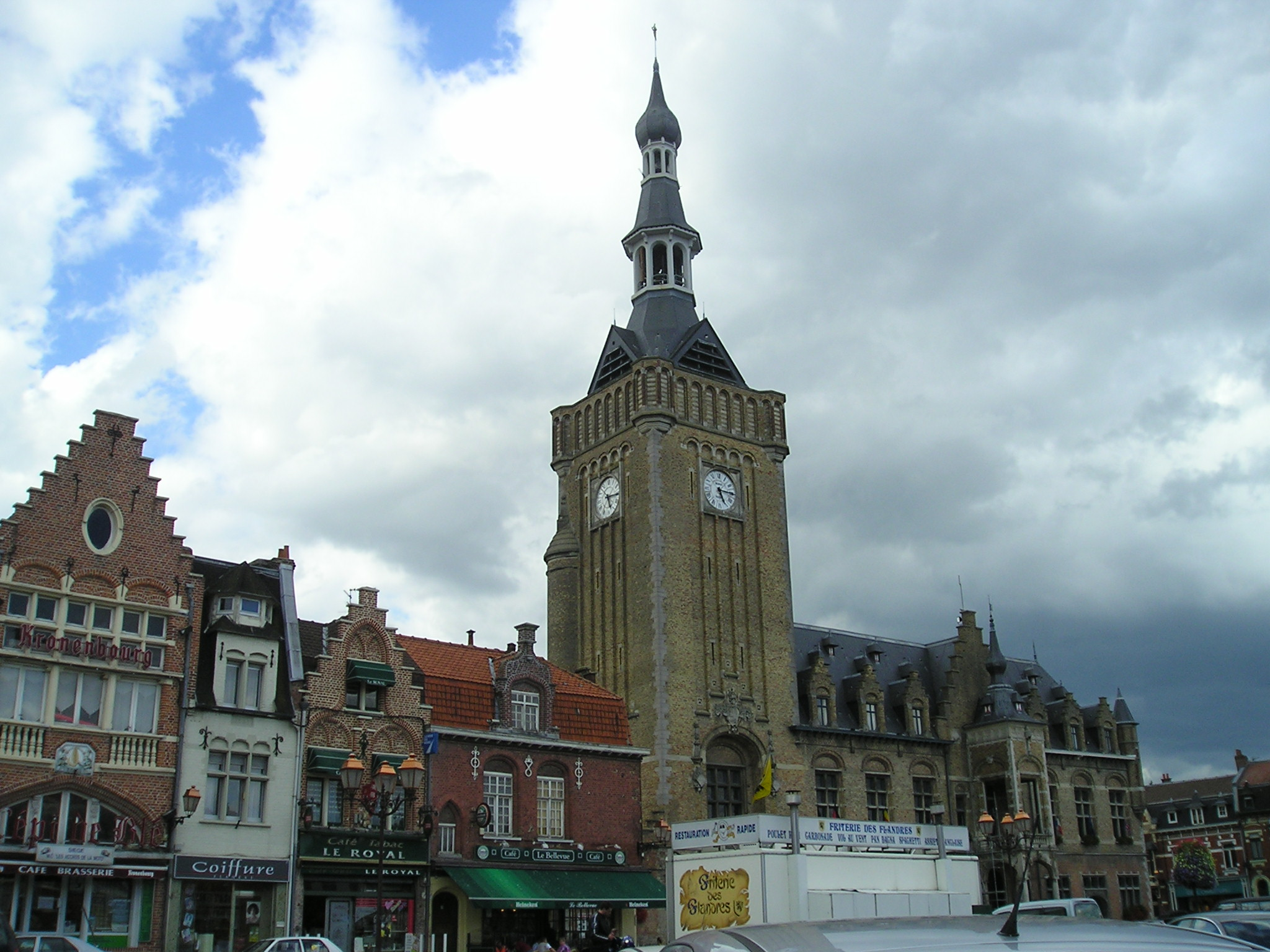
- The Market place and the Hôtel de Ville

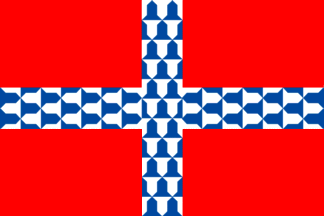
- Flag Coat of arms
- Location of Bailleul
- Location within France Location within Hauts-de-France
- Coordinates: 50°44′21″N 2°44′00″E
- Country: France
- Region: Hauts-de-France
- Department: Nord
- Arrondissement: Dunkerque
- Canton: Bailleul
- Intercommunality: CA Cœur de Flandre

Government
  - Mayor (2020–2026): Antony Gautier
- Area^{1}: 43.42 km^{2} (16.76 sq mi)
- Elevation: 44 m (144 ft)
- Highest elevation: 86 m (282 ft)
- Lowest elevation: 14 m (46 ft)
- Population (2023): 14,732
  - Density: 339.3/km^{2} (878.8/sq mi)
- Time zone: UTC+01:00 (CET)
  - Summer (DST): UTC+02:00 (CEST)
- INSEE/Postal code: 59043 /59270
- ^{1} French Land Register data, which excludes lakes, ponds, glaciers > 1 km^{2} (0.386 sq mi or 247 acres) and river estuaries.

Bailleul (French pronunciation: [bajœl]; Belle in Dutch) is a commune in the Nord department in northern France. It is located in French Flanders, 3 km (2 mi) from the Belgian border and 26 km (16 mi) northwest of Lille.

== Population ==
Historical population

Year	Pop.	±% p.a.
1793	11,576	—
1800	8,944	−3.62%
1806	9,222	+0.51%
1821	9,475	+0.18%
1831	9,823	+0.36%
1836	9,911	+0.18%
1841	9,923	+0.02%
1846	10,141	+0.44%
1851	10,078	−0.12%
1856	10,108	+0.06%
1861	10,102	−0.01%
1866	12,896	+5.00%
1872	12,828	−0.09%
1876	12,968	+0.27%
1881	12,712	−0.40%
1886	13,335	+0.96%
1891	13,276	−0.09%
1896	13,449	+0.26%
1901	13,530	+0.12%

Year	Pop.	±% p.a.
1906	13,573	+0.06%
1911	13,251	−0.48%
1921	6,651	−6.66%
1926	8,545	+5.14%
1931	9,691	+2.55%
1936	10,928	+2.43%
1946	11,352	+0.38%
1954	11,964	+0.66%
1962	12,583	+0.63%
1968	13,077	+0.64%
1975	13,474	+0.43%
1982	13,400	−0.08%
1990	13,847	+0.41%
1999	14,146	+0.24%
2007	13,496	−0.59%
2012	14,564	+1.53%
2017	14,769	+0.28%
2023	14,732	−0.04%

Source: EHESS and INSEE (1968-2023)

== Heraldry ==
Arms of Bailleul	The arms of Bailleul are blazoned: Gules, a cross vair.

== Media ==
Bailleul is the birthplace of French filmmaker Bruno Dumont and served as the setting for his first two feature films. This area is also a setting in the Timothy Findley book The Wars.

== Points of interest ==
The city hall and belfry of Bailleul was inscribed on the UNESCO World Heritage List in 2005 as part of the Belfries of Belgium and France site, in recognition of their importance in the rise of municipal power in Europe.

The Jardin des Plantes Sauvages du Conservatoire botanique national de Bailleul is a botanical garden of protected plants. Over 850 species of native plants are found in the garden.

== History ==
In 1526, Flanders fell to the Spanish Netherlands by the Treaty of Madrid. Under the reign of Philip II, the first religious problems arose between Flanders and Spain.

In the 17th century, Flanders was a permanent battlefield. Louis XIV reconquered Flanders. As a result, Bailleul reverted to France in 1678.

With the Treaty of Utrecht, Flanders and with it Bailleul fell to Austria in 1713, before both finally passed to France in 1745 after the Battle of Fontenoy and the Treaty of Aachen. Numerous fires marked the history of the city.

From the 17th to the 19th century, the bobbin lace craft developed in Bailleul. (La Maison de la Dentelle bobbin lace museum), a craft for which the town is still known far beyond its borders.

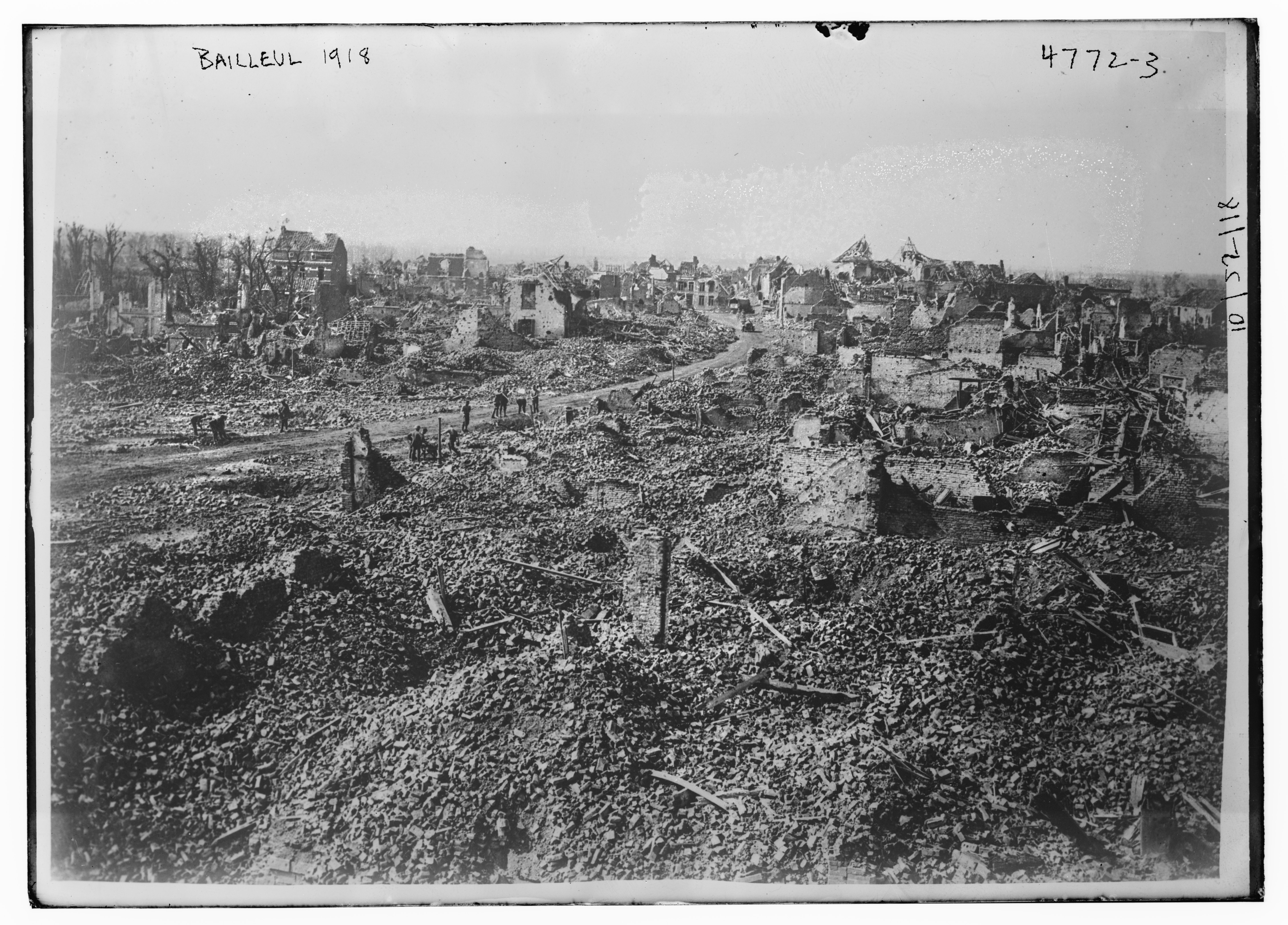
Bailleul in 1918

During the First World War, the area around Bailleul was at times heavily affected by the heavy fighting that German and Allied troops engaged in around the nearby Belgian town of Ypres. When German troops used chlorine gas against the Allied troops near Wulverghem (municipality of Heuvelland, Belgium) on 30 April 1916 over a front length of 3.2 kilometres, the resulting toxic gas cloud extended as far as Bailleul. During the German Spring Offensive in Operation Georgette from 13 April 1918, Bailleul with its old Flemish Town Centre was more than 90 per cent destroyed. After the severe destruction of the First World War, the town was rebuilt in the Neo-Flemish style during the 20th century. A typical example of the architectural style, which was widespread throughout Flanders, is the Hôtel de Ville of 1932 with its bell tower.

== Railways ==
Bailleul has a railway station on the line from Lille to Calais and Dunkirk.

== International relations ==
Bailleul is twinned with:

- Werne, Germany, since 1967
- Hawick, Scotland, United Kingdom, since 1973
- Izegem, Belgium, since 1992
- Kyritz, Germany, since 2012
- Wałcz, Poland, since 2015

== Personalities ==
- Edmond de Coussemaker
- Pharaon de Winter, painter
- Marguerite Yourcenar, academic
- Jean Delobel, politician
- Michel Delebarre, politician
- Bruno Dumont, director and filmmaker
- Philippe Édouard Léon Van Tieghem, Biologist and botanist born in Bailleul in 1839
- Jean-Luc Samyn, jockey in American thoroughbred racing

== See also ==
- Communes of the Nord department
