= André Rossinot =

French politician (born 1939)

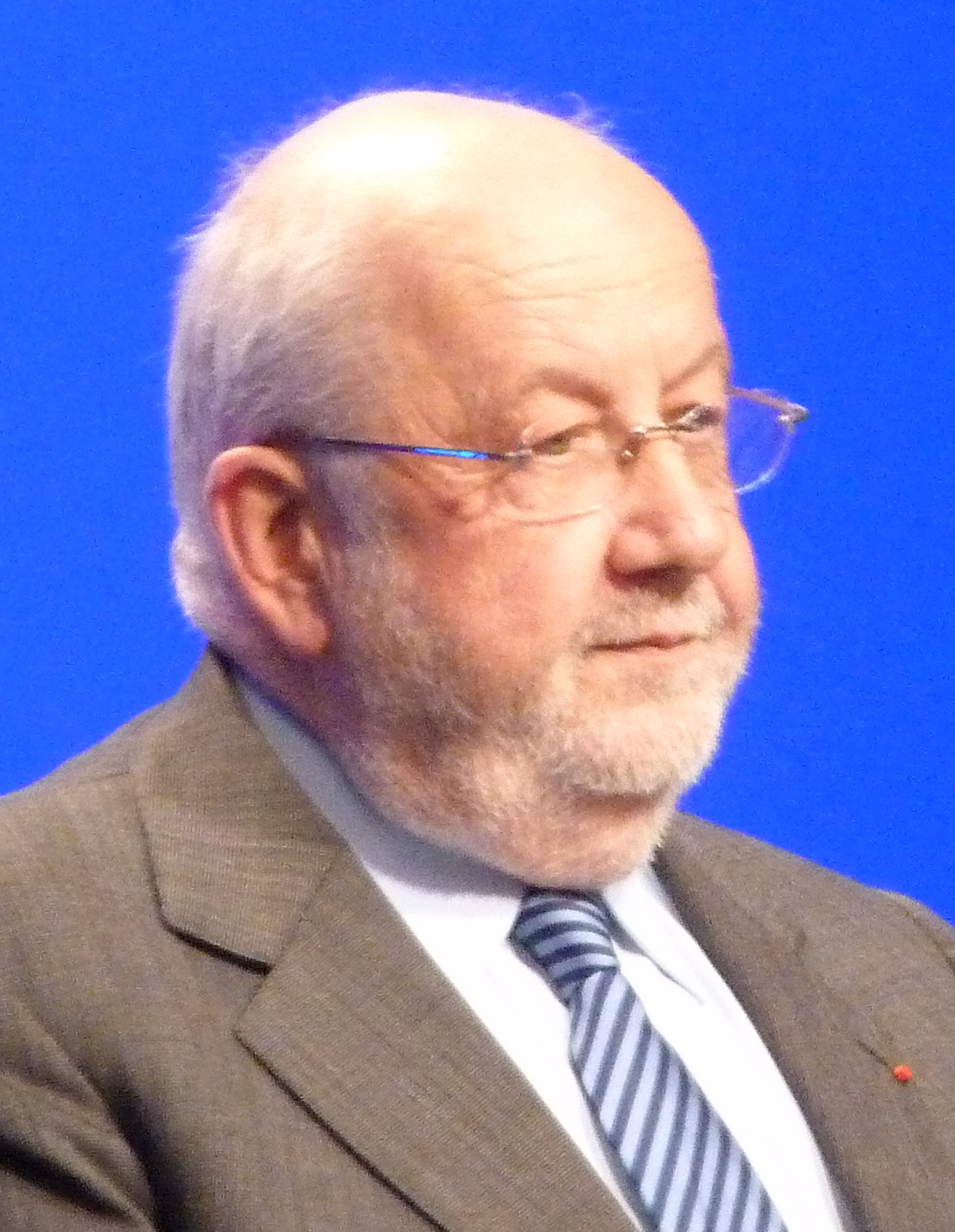
- André Rossinot in 2012

Mayor of Nancy
- In office 12 March 1983 – 6 April 2014
- Preceded by: Claude Coulais
- Succeeded by: Laurent Hénart

Minister of Civil Service
- In office 30 March 1993 – 11 May 1995
- President: François Mitterrand
- Prime Minister: Édouard Balladur
- Preceded by: Michel Delebarre
- Succeeded by: Jean Puech

Personal details
- Born: 22 May 1939 (age 87) Briey, France
- Party: Radical Party
- Education: Nancy University
- Profession: Physician

André Rossinot (French: [ɑ̃dʁe ʁɔsino]; born 22 May 1939) is a French politician. He is a medical doctor specialist in Otolaryngology. He is a member of the Radical Party.

== Career ==
Between 1978 and 1997, he was a member of the French National Assembly. From 1993 until 1995, he was the Minister of Civil Service. He is an officer of the Légion d'honneur and an honorary member of the Académie de Stanislas.

Rossinot, currently the president of the Urban Community of Nancy, is the former mayor of Nancy (Meurthe-et-Moselle) and honorary president of the Radical Party. He was president of the party at different points in the 1980s, 1990s and 2000s, before and after it aligned with the UMP.

In April 2018, he announced his support for French President Emmanuel Macron.
