= Yves Durand (politician) =

French politician

Yves Durand (born 6 June 1946 in Ambrières-les-Vallées) is a French politician, a member of the National Assembly. He represents the Nord department, and is a member of the Socialiste, radical, citoyen et divers gauche.

On 28 February 2013, The Commission des affaires culturelles et de l’éducation, of which Durand is part, voted in favour of an amendment proposed by Martine Faure, and favoured by Durand, Martine Martinel and Marie-George Buffet among others, to replace, in the national elementary curriculum, the biological concept of "sex" with the concept of "gender" to include a social dimension. The elementary curriculum was successfully revised in September 2013 under the name "l'ABCD de l'egalite".
