= Robert Besson =

French politician (1903–1978)

Robert Alix Besson (29 September 1903 – 12 June 1978) was a French politician.

== Early life ==
Besson was born in Koléa, Algeria, on 29 September 1903, to parents from Charente-Maritime. He was raised in Villeneuve-de-Marsan and attended École nationale des travaux publics de l'État.

== Political career ==
He was chief engineer and later deputy director of Etablissements France-Route in Mont-de-Marsan. Besson's candidacy for the mayoralty of Mont-de-Marsan was backed by the Rally of the French People. He was first elected to the office in October 1947, succeeding Marcel David. In March 1949, Besson was elected to the general council of Landes. His colleagues appointed him vice president of the body, and he remained in office until 1961. In 1962, Besson stepped down from the mayoralty, and was replaced by Charles Lamarque-Cando.

In 1951, Besson was placed on the party list of the Union républicaine et de progrès social, a political coalition, but not elected to the National Assembly. During the 1956 legislative elections, the Union républicaine et de progrès social party list expanded to include members of the Rally of Republican Lefts coalition, resulting in Besson's election to the National Assembly. He served until 1958.

== Death ==
Besson died in Mont-de-Marsan on 12 June 1978. He was posthumously promoted to the rank of officer of the Legion of Honour in April 1989.
