= Besson =

Besson may refer to:

== People ==
- Besson (surname)

== Places ==
- Besson, Allier, a commune of the Allier département in France
- Besson, Central African Republic, a village in Nana-Mambéré Prefecture, Central African Republic

== Other uses ==
- Besson (music company), a manufacturer of brass instruments
- Besson (aircraft), a French aircraft manufacturer of the 1920s/1930s (particularly float planes)

== See also ==
- Bessone (surname)
- Zec de la Bessonne, a controlled harvesting zone (zec) in Quebec, in Canada
