= Hôtel de Ville, Mont-de-Marsan =

Town hall in Mont-de-Marsan, France

Hôtel de Ville
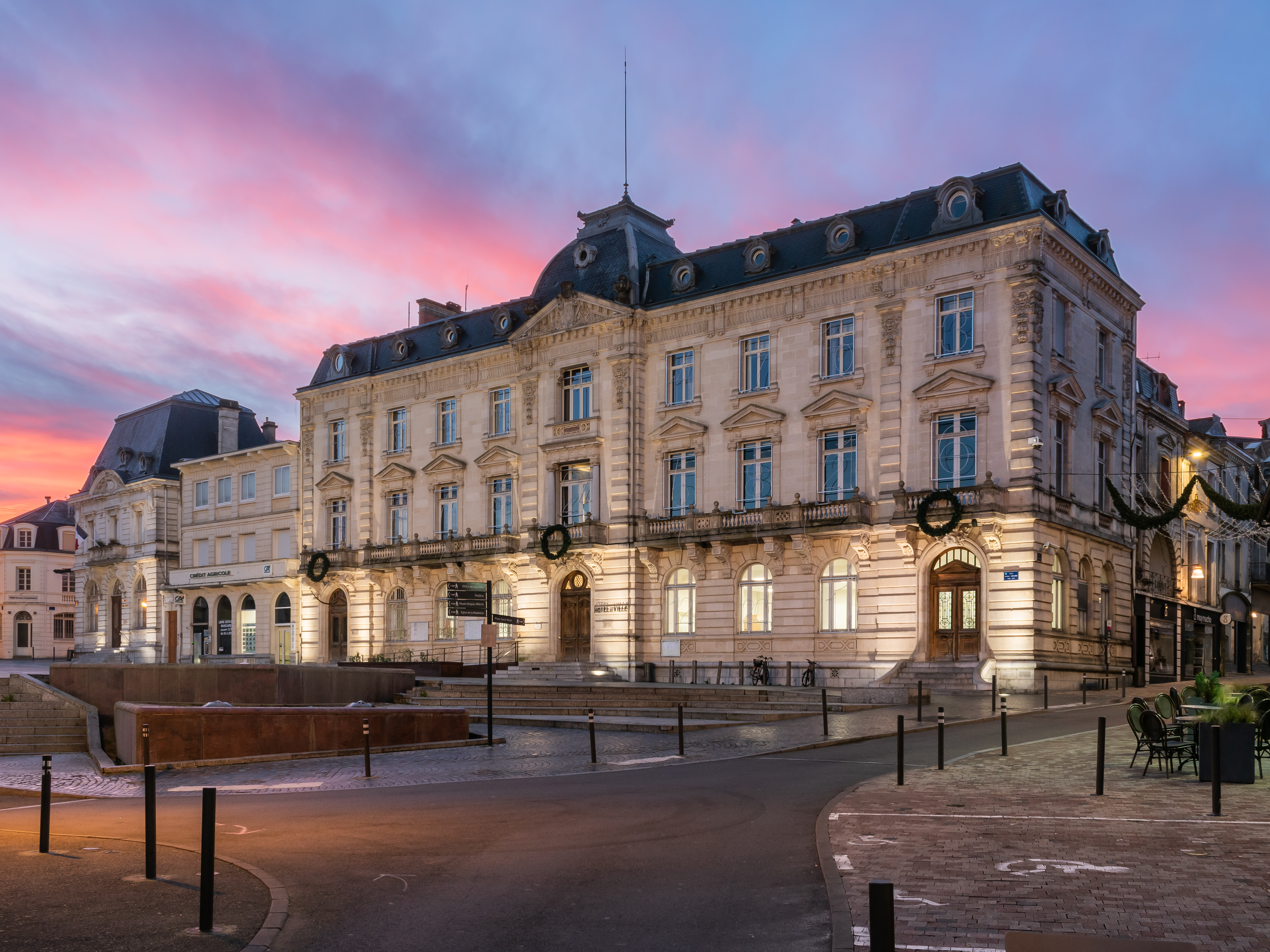
- The main frontage of the Hôtel de Ville in January 2023
- Interactive map of the Hôtel de Ville area

General information
- Type: City hall
- Architectural style: Neoclassical style
- Location: Mont-de-Marsan, France
- Coordinates: 43.8908°N 0.5009°W
- Completed: 1901

Design and construction
- Architect: Henri Dépruneaux

The Hôtel de Ville (French pronunciation: [otɛl də vil], City Hall) is a municipal building in Mont-de-Marsan, Landes, in southwestern France, standing on Place du Général Leclerc.

== History ==
=== The old town hall ===
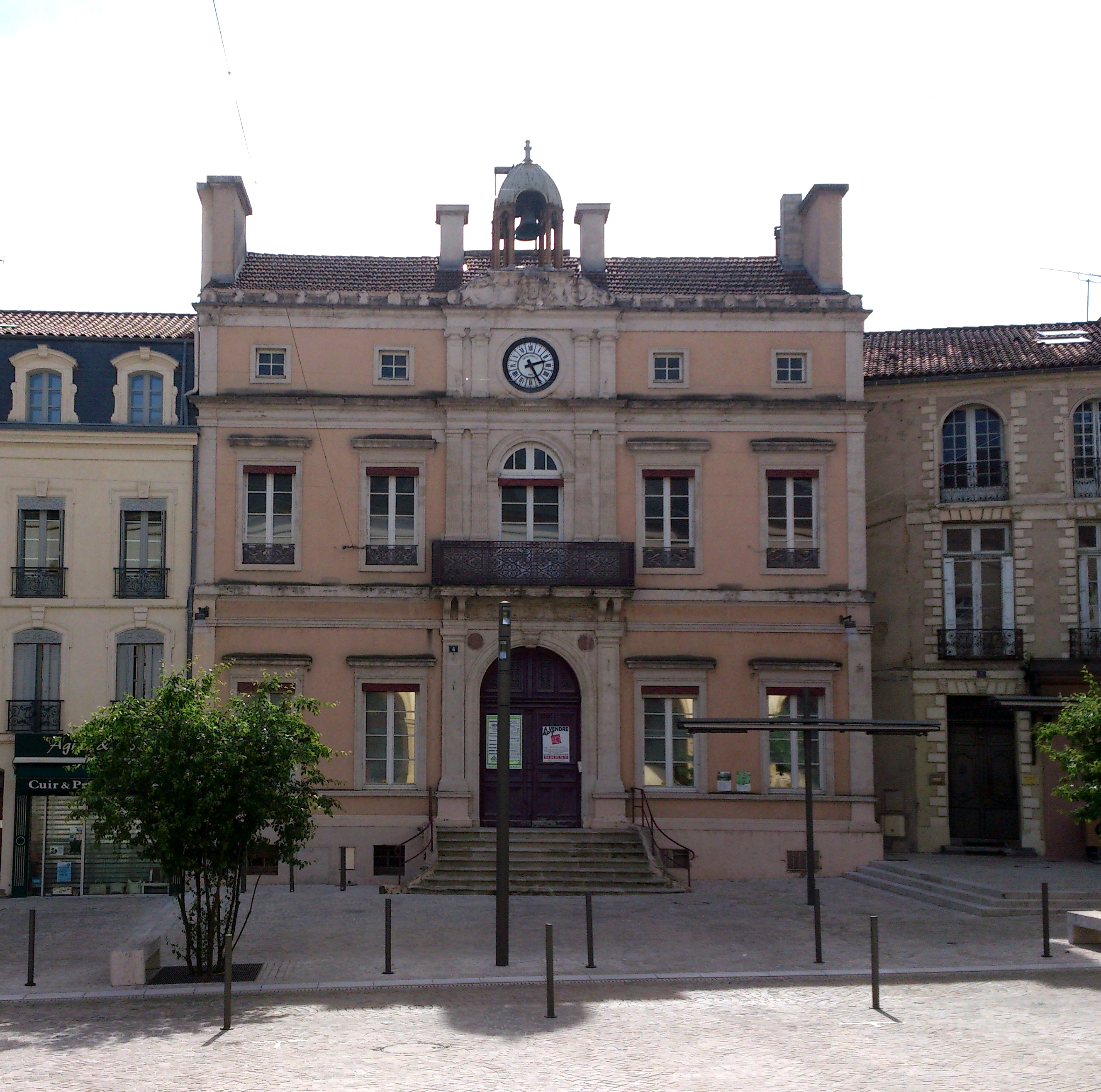
The old town hall

The first town hall was a single-storey structure established on the west side of Place Bourbon (now Place du Général de Gaulle), on the north side of the River Midou, in the 12th century. In the early 1840s, the town council decided to demolish the old town hall and build a new municipal building on the same site. The new building was designed by Sieur Duprat in the neoclassical style, built in brick with a cement render finish and was completed in 1846.

The design involved a symmetrical main frontage of five bays facing onto the square. The central bay, which was faced in ashlar stone, featured a short flight of steps leading up to a round headed opening with a keystone and an archivolt. It was flanked by Doric order pilasters and brackets supporting a balcony with iron railings. On the first floor, there was a round headed French door flanked by pairs of Doric order pilasters supporting an entablature and, on the second floor, there was a clock, flanked by pairs of Ionic order pilasters supporting another entablature as well as an octagonal bell tower with a dome. The outer bays were fenestrated by casement windows with stone surrounds and cornices on the first two floors and by small square windows on the second floor.

Internally, the principal room was the Salle du Conseil (council chamber) which was decorated by the artist, Jean Henri Tayan. For many years, it displayed a statue of the military leader, Marshal Pierre Bosquet, who was born in the town and commanded a division during the Crimean War.

Following the liberation of the town on 21 August 1944, during the Second World War, a member of the French Resistance, Marcel David, went onto the balcony and was acclaimed as the new mayor. After inspecting troops at the local barracks, General Philippe Leclerc de Hauteclocque visited the town hall in July 1945.

After it was no longer required for municipal use, the old town hall served as a library until 2012 and was then converted into a block of private apartments, known as "La Romancière", in 2018.

=== The current town hall ===
In 1946, following substantial population growth, the town council decided to acquire a larger town hall. The building they selected was the Palais Pascal Duprat (Pascal Duprat Palace) on the south side of Place Pascal Duprat (now Place du Général Leclerc). The site had been occupied by the Couvent des Barnabites (Convent of the Barnabites) which had been established there in the mid-17th century. The building was commissioned by the French Army as an officers' mess for the 34th Infantry Regiment and also to provide space for an archaeological museum known as the Musée Dubalen. It was designed by Henri Dépruneaux in the neoclassical style, built in ashlar stone and was completed in 1901.

The design involved a symmetrical main frontage of nine bays facing onto Place Pascal Duprat. The central bay, which was slightly projected forward, featured a round headed doorway with a keystone and an archivolt on the ground floor. It was flanked by brackets supporting a balustraded balcony. On the first floor, there was a French door flanked by Ionic order columns supporting an entablature and a cornice and, on the second floor, there was another French door flanked by Doric order pilasters supporting an entablature and a pediment. The other bays were fenestrated by round headed windows on the ground floor, by casement windows with balustraded balconies and pediments on the first floor and by casement windows with window sills on the second floor. There were oculi at attic level. The façade was decorated by sculptures by Jean-Éloi Ducom representing the Greek mythological gods, Athena, Heracles and Theseus.

During the Second World War, the building served as the local Kommandantur (command centre) for the occupying German troops. It was acquired by the town council and re-opened as the town hall in January 1946.
