= Donjon Lacataye =

Keep of a 14th-century castle in Landes, France

Coordinates: 43°53′32″N 0°29′56″W

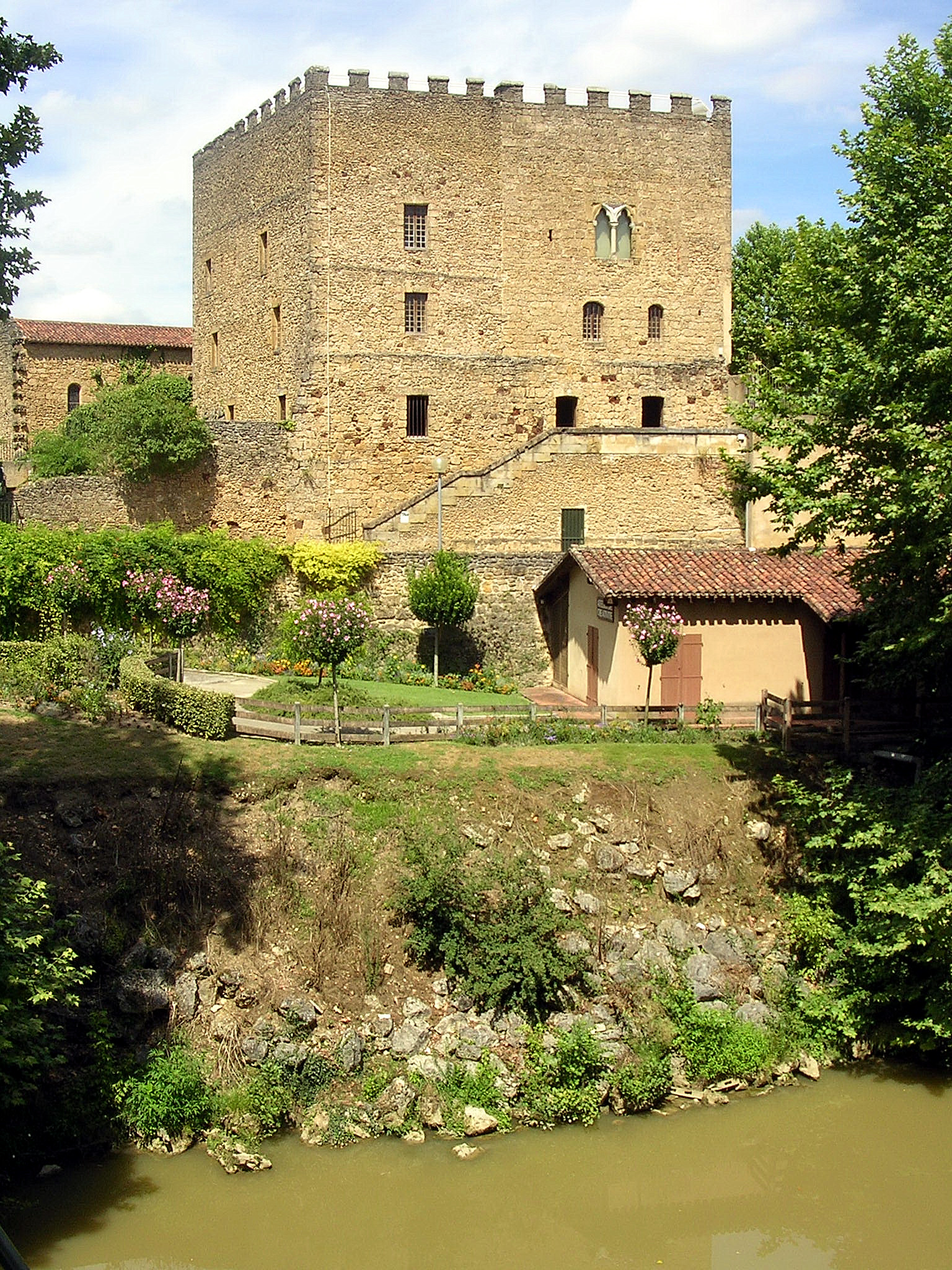
Donjon Lacataye on the banks of the Midou, Mont-de-Marsan

The Donjon Lacataye is the keep of a 14th-century castle, constructed by order of Gaston Phébus in the commune of Mont-de-Marsan in the Landes département of France. Today, it houses the Musée Despiau-Wlérick.

== History ==
La Cataye consists of two joined Romanesque houses, which one sees perfectly while entering the current museum whose central internal wall includes Romanesque windows, a sign that one of the two houses was built before the second. These houses belonged to the Viscount's family and were more or less abandoned starting from the 15th century, when the Viscounts moved away from their town of origin. During the 16th century, their upper parts were modified and they were equipped with crenellations. The material used is coquillère, a local sedimentary rock.

The name Cataye comes from the Spanish verb "castar", to supervise. It is entirely possible that these houses replaced a preceding mound structure with tower because the site is also called: "pujorin", i.e. "pouy jorin" (pouy: height and jorin, deformation of lorenh: towards the east).

In 1860, Antoine Lacaze, mayor and owner of the keep, gave it to the town to house troops. It later became the departmental barracks until 1875, when the soldiers moved to the Bosquet barracks in the town. The keep preserved the name Caserne Lacaze (Lacaze Barracks) for nearly a century, in spite of a succession of civil uses: boarding school for young girls, gymnastics centre, municipal workshop.

== The keep today ==
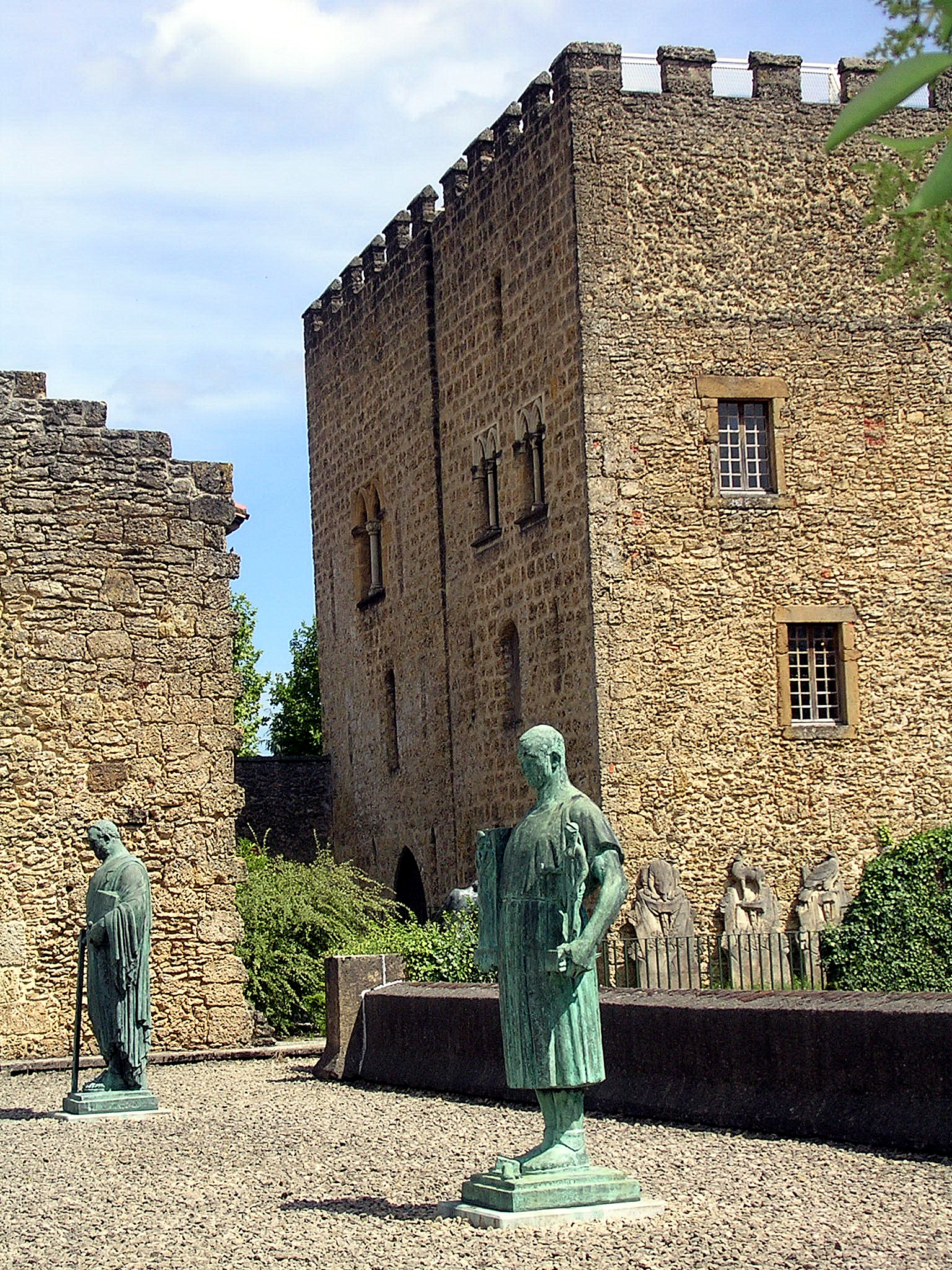
Despiau-Wlérick Museum (outside), in Mont de Marsan

In 1968, mayor Charles Lamarque-Cando inaugurated in the keep a museum of modern figurative sculpture (the Musée de Mont-de-Marsan), dedicated to two local artists, Charles Despiau and Robert Wlérick.

It has been listed since 1942 as a monument historique by the French Ministry of Culture.

== See also ==
- List of castles in France
