= Beston =

Beston is a surname. Notable people with the surname include:

- Henry Beston (1888–1968), American writer and naturalist
- John Beston (died 1428), English writer

== See also ==
- Besson (surname)
