= Camille Dussarthou =

French physician and politician (1907–1965)

Camille Dussarthou (4 December 1907 – 27 October 1965) was a French physician and politician.

== Biography ==
Dussarthou was born on 4 December 1907 in Bayonne, to a military officer and his wife. Dussarthou attended schools in Tarbes and Montauban before pursuing medical studies in Toulouse. He also studied geology and physical education, and was trained in forensic science at hospitals in Paris. Upon his return to Saint-Paul-lès-Dax in 1936, Dussarthou became a general practitioner. Due to his medical background, he was mobilized for World War II military service, active from September 1939 to July 1940. After that, Dussarthou became a reservist, and his expertise in forensics aided the local courts in Dax. Dussarthou's participated in the French Resistance group Léon and was taken as a prisoner of war on 30 July 1944. He was freed when the city of Dax was liberated on 23 August 1944. For his actions during the war, Dussarthou was award the knight's cross of the Legion of Honour, the Croix de Guerre 1939–1945, and the Medal of French Gratitude.

Dussarthou was elected to three terms as mayor of Saint-Paul-lès-Dax in 1945, 1953, and 1959. He launched his first unsuccessful campaign for a seat on the National Assembly in 1951. In 1956, he was listed third, behind fellow French Section of the Workers' International candidates Charles Lamarque-Cando and Marcel David. Dussarthou finished ahead of Jean Lespiau but trailed Max Moras in the 1958 legislative elections. Dussarthou defeated Moras in 1961, and was elected to replace Eugène Milliès-Lacroix, who had died in office, on the general council of Dax. Dussarthou faced Moras for a third time in the 1962 legislative election, and claimed another victory. Dussarthou represented Landes's 2nd constituency on the National Assembly until his death on 27 October 1965. Dussarthou had fallen ill during his 1962 legislative campaign, and gradually withdrew from legislative duties as his health worsened. He was succeeded as mayor by Henri Lavielle and on the National Assembly by alternate deputy Fernand Secheer, before Lavielle took office in 1967.
