= 1946 French constitutional referendum in Dahomey and Togo =

The 1946 French constitutional referendum in Dahomey and Togo may refer to:

- May 1946 French constitutional referendum in Dahomey and Togo, a constitutional referendum held on May 5
- October 1946 French constitutional referendum in Dahomey and Togo, a constitutional referendum held on October 13
