= 1946 French constitutional referendum in Algeria =

The 1946 French constitutional referendum in Algeria may refer to:

- May 1946 French constitutional referendum in Algeria
- October 1946 French constitutional referendum in Algeria
