= Charles Lamarque-Cando =

French politician (1901–1989)

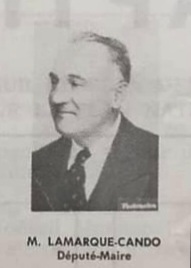
Charles Lamarque-Cando

Charles Lamarque-Cando (12 January 1901 – 30 November 1989) was a French politician.

== Biography ==
Lamarque-Cando was born on 12 January 1901 in Onard. His father was a farmer, and his mother was a schoolteacher. Lamarque-Cando attended a normal school in Mont-de-Marsan and began his teaching career at a French-language school in San Sebastián, Spain. Upon his return to France, Lamarque-Cando continued teaching at Aire-sur-Adour, and became politically active. He served as federal secretary of the National Teachers' Union and soon joined the French Section of the Workers' International (SFIO). In February 1934, Lamarque-Cando founded an anti-fascist organization, and joined a socialist association based in Landes, serving as the latter group's secretary from September 1936.

Lamarque-Cando won his first political office in the February 1936 cantonal elections with 62 percent of the vote, and immediately planned to contest the 1936 French legislative elections. He received 47 percent of the vote, and was not seated to the Chamber of Deputies. He was, however, reelected a general councillor representing Sabres in October 1937. In 1941, Lamarque-Cando organized a group of French Resistance members in Mont-de-Marsan affiliated with Libération-Nord. Among its membership was Marcel David. While allied with the French Forces of the Interior, Lamarque-Cando worked within a network led by Maurice Buckmaster of the Special Operations Executive. Lamarque-Cando was awarded the Resistance Medal and the Croix de Guerre 1939–1945 for his actions during World War II. His political career resumed after the war, as he returned to the Sabres seat on the general council, and chaired the body from September 1945 to April 1949.

Lamarque-Cando was ranked first on the SFIO party list in Landes, and won election to the Constituent Assembly in October 1945, as 59,599 of 122,610 total votes were cast for the SFIO. He voted to approve the new French constitution devised during the tenure of the First Constituent Assembly. However, citizens rejected the drafted constitution via referendum, necessitating elections for the Second Constituent Assembly, to which Lamarque-Cando was also elected, as the SFIO party list claimed 52,419 of 134,850 votes. Lamarque-Cando voted to approve the second draft of the constitution, as did the majority of citizens who voted in an October referendum. He sought election to the First National Assembly in November, and won, despite lower turnout, with the SFIO party list claiming 45,039 of 125,149 votes cast. Lamarque-Cando won another term as deputy in 1951, with 39,715 of 126,254 total votes. He opted to focus on his role as a deputy during this term in office. On 7 October 1951, Lamarque-Cando resigned from the general council of Landes, and vacated his Sabres municipal council position on 26 April 1953. Lamarque-Cando earned a larger vote share in 1956, 48,577 votes out of 133,940, and retained his seat on the National Assembly. Upon losing his seat in the 1958 legislative elections, Lamarque-Cando focused on leading a construction cooperative, and on his career as a printer and bookseller. Lamarque-Cando returned to the National Assembly in the 1962 legislative elections, and was reelected in 1967. After the National Assembly was dissolved due to the May 68 protests, he lost subsequent legislative campaigns in June 1968 and March 1973.

Lamarque-Cando's tenure as mayor of Mont-de-Marsan lasted 23 years, from 1962 to 1983, and overlapped with other mandates as general councillor (1962–1979) and regional councillor (1972–1982).

He died on 30 November 1989 in Mont-de-Marsan.

== Honors and Awards ==
- Officer of the Order of Legion of Honour
- Resistance Medal
