= Demoicracy =

Political theory

Demoicracy (also demoi-cracy; /dɪˈmɔɪkrəsi/ di-MOY-krə-see) is a polity of multiple distinct people (demoi), polity of polities. The term is derived from demoi (δῆμοι in original Ancient Greek, plural form of δῆμος or demos), meaning "peoples" and kratos (κράτος) meaning "power" (to govern oneself). It is apparently meant to become an alternative to democracy, understood as power of a single demos. The term is used mainly to describe the genus of the European Union (EU) but is also gaining currency in more general theories of democracy above state level.

== History ==
Philippe van Parijs used the term "demoi-cracy" negatively in 1998 to refer to the existing state of affair in Europe and in contrast to "European demos-cracy". This is not the meaning of the term in mainstream scholarship today. Instead, the term refers to Kalypso Nicolaïdis original statement in 2003 that the EU ought to be understood as a demoicracy in the making, a third way against two alternatives which both equate the possibility of democracy with the existence of a single demos, either national demos (the EU as association of democratic states) or supranational (the EU as a federal state). In contrast, the EU is not and should not be conceived of as any form of state (federal or any other) and does not depend on the existence of a single European demos to be demoicratic. Thus, the concept has both descriptive and normative aspects. It tries to square the circle between the common criticism that the EU is undemocratic (the democratic deficit thesis) and the claim that there is no European demos (the no demos thesis), purporting that a demos is not a sine qua non for democracy and multiple separate demoi can effectively control the government and in that sense exercise popular sovereignty. Later, Nicolaidis refined her definition of demoicracy as "a Union of peoples who govern together but not as one"

== Philosophy ==
Nicolaïdis's originally advanced the concept as an alternative to the calls of the philosopher Jürgen Habermas and by the former German foreign minister Joschka Fischer that a common European identity must and should be ‘forged’. Instead, she argued in favour of a community which recognises its irreducible internal pluralism and is based on mutual recognition of differences rather than shared values as Habermas would have it. While both sides of the debate premise their argument on some arguable empirical claims (distinct ‘European’ values or celebration of tolerance respectively), neither of these is necessary for the normative plausibility of demoicracy as a theoretical concept. Currently many other commentators maintain that the concept is uniquely adequate for the age of interdependence of states and globalization of governance which should supersede the 'nation-centred' vocabulary. Perhaps that is why the term was later embraced by some of the major proponents of deliberative democracy like James Bohman and Samantha Besson (even if not by Habermas himself). With the work of the latter authors the concept gained currency beyond the EU-scholarship and especially among the cosmopolitan republicanists as the most promising way for realisation of transnational democracy. Bohman in particular sees demoicracy as an emancipation project. It is meant to avoid domination which can occur across borders (citizens of one state may suffer from decisions of citizens of another which are taken arbitrarily). As domination can occur also internally all oppressed groups may qualify as demoi deserving a voice in governance. Thus, Besson suggests a dynamic concept of demoi, which comprises all those affected by any particular decision (and thus subject to arbitrary domination by the group of the decision-makers).

== European Union ==
With regard to the EU the concept has been criticized because it does not provide an answer to the 'no demos thesis' but merely disguises the problem of democratic deficit and forgoes the capacity of peoples to collectively control their fate. Yet the concept is certainly more than a euphemism or exercise in scholastic creativity – if the EU is qualitatively different from the nation state (and from the federation) it needs to be analysed in different terms as well. As many academics claim the EU is not a (super-)state, it might be considered misleading to evaluate it in terms of a state. Indeed, it makes little sense to claim that the Union is not a state and in the same time to criticise it for not being a democratic one. On the other hand, if it is recognised that the Union, as a polity of its own kind is to be analysed in idiosyncratic terms, we face a problem of circularity – we face an entity which claims to be a standard to itself. Recognising that, Francis Cheneval and Frank Schimmelfenning propose to extend the moral constructivism of John Rawls to transnational cases: 'the inter-subjective beliefs about the moral purpose of the liberal democratic state do not only imply the normative expectation of rule of law and procedural justice for the fundamental institutions of international society. They also imply normative expectations of democratic government in a society of liberal democratic states. The inter-subjective beliefs about the moral purpose of the liberal democratic state will eventually filter through into the relational structure of liberal democratic states.'

Thus they set out to derive abstract moral principles for a demoicracy and use them to judge the EU subsequently. Their principles apply to transnational as well as to national level, and they find that the EU is approaching these principle while 'major demoi-cratic deficits remain at the national level.' In spite of this optimistic result, there is at least one deficiency of the EU from demoicratic perspective and it is that the governance discourse is almost exclusively elitist. This is especially problematic as demoicracy is calling for even more involvement of citizens on issues of governance.

== Development ==
Most demoicracy scholarship is abstract, and very little has been done to flesh out what an actual demoicracy should look like. Yet there are few practical claims that seem shared by all of the commentators. The first is the reliance on networks as agents of democracy beyond the nation-state where discourses are not mediated by states or nationality. The second is the active participation of citizens in these networks so that they are involved in the decision-making, deliberations and contestation at every level. All demoicrats would emphasise the importance of horizontal relationships between citizens, organisations and institutions from the different demoi on issues of their collective governance or on the governance of other states. Rights and legitimate interests of citizens are not limited to their own demos/polity but are extended across the borders to what is usually considered internal affairs of the other polities and people. This horizontal relationship is what distinguishes a demoicracy from a federation where the internal affairs of a federal unit are insulated from external contestation at least horizontally.

Beyond these general principles however, few details of an actual demoicracy are spelled out. To remedy this, Cheneval and Schimmelfenning with a team of researchers at ETH Zurich have embarked on a project intended 'to map and explain the development of demoicratic institutions.' A precious few examples of genuine demoicratic institutions have been identified by other researchers. Bohman celebrates the system of policy coordination through committees and agencies in the EU as a demoicratic mechanism. This is noteworthy, as from the traditional, that is demo-cratic, perspective the influence of numerous EU committees and working parties is quite questionable. In the same vein, Michael Buess reconsiders the interaction between the EU agencies and their national counterparts from demoicratic perspective. Another example of demoicratically interlinked institutions is the so-called ‘yellow card’ or Early Warning Mechanism introduced by the Lisbon Treaty. According to Vesco Paskalev this is an attempt to provide an institutionalized network which enables many demoi to deliberate together on substantive EU legislation.
