= Besson (surname) =

Besson is a French surname.

== Geographical distribution ==
As of 2014, 82.7% of all known bearers of the surname Besson were residents of France (frequency 1:2,013), 5.5% of Switzerland (1:3,767), 3.3% of the United States (1:275,554) and 1.5% of Brazil (1:338,037).

In France, the frequency of the surname was higher than national average (1:2,013) in the following regions:

1. Auvergne-Rhône-Alpes (1:606)
2. French Guiana (1:1,016)
3. Bourgogne-Franche-Comté (1:1,441)
4. Pays de la Loire (1:1,593)
5. Nouvelle-Aquitaine (1:1,747)

In Switzerland, the frequency of the surname was higher than national average (1:3,767) in the following cantons:

1. Vaud (1:652)
2. Geneva (1:1,140)
3. Neuchâtel (1:1,369)
4. Valais (1:1,427)

== People ==
- Adèle Besson (fl. 1918), Frenchwoman, subject of Renoir portrait
- Albert Besson (1896–1965), French physician
- Antoine-Marie-Benoît Besson (1876–1969), French army general during World War II
- Benno Besson (1922–2006), Swiss actor and film director
- Billy Besson (born 1981), French competitive sailor
- Bruno Besson (born 1979), French former racing driver
- Corbyn Besson, American singer
- Colette Besson (1946–2005), French athlete
- Éric Besson (born 1958), French minister
- François Besson (born 1968), French water polo player
- Frank S. Besson Jr. (1910–1985), U.S. Army general
- George Besson (1882–1971), French art critic
- Gérard Besson (1942–2023), Trinidadian writer and publisher
- Giuliano Besson (1950–2025), Italian alpine skier
- Gustave Auguste Besson (1820–1874), brass instrument maker
- Hugo Besson (born 2001), French professional basketball player
- Hyacinthe Besson (1816–1861), French painter and missionary priest
- Jacques Besson (1540?–1573), French inventor
- Jean Besson (born 1948), French politician
- Jules Besson (1868–?), French painter
- Louis Besson (1937–2026), French politician
- Luc Besson (born 1959), film director
- Pablo Besson (1848–1932), Swiss Baptist missionary
- Pascale Besson (born 1960), French synchronized swimmer
- Patrick Besson (born 1956), French writer and journalist
- Paul Besson (1926–1988), Swiss wrestler
- Philippe Besson (born 1967), French writer
- Robert Besson (1903–1978), French politician
- Samantha Besson (born 1973), law professor
- Shanna Besson (born 1993), French actress and photographer
- Thalia Besson (born 2001), French actress and model

== See also ==
- Bessone (surname)
