= Castandet pottery =

Ceramics made in Castandet, Landes, France

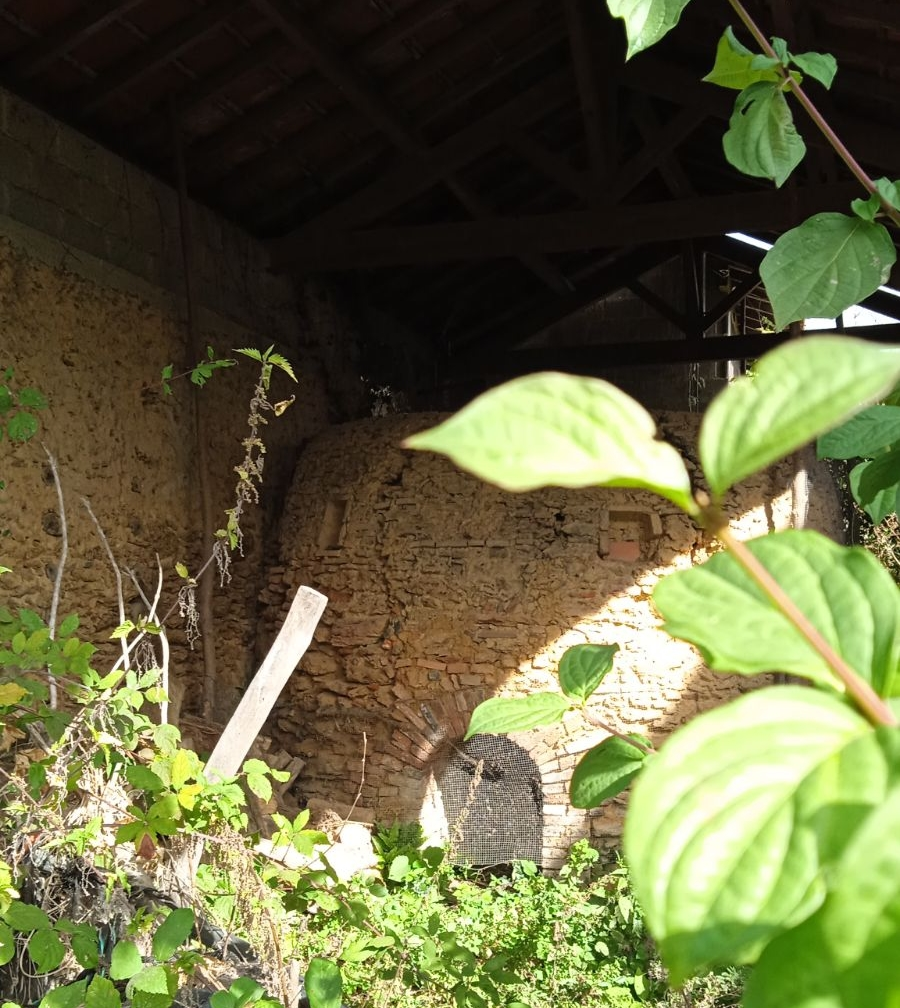
The only pottery kiln still preserved in Castandet, built in the 19th century, as seen in 2023.

The Castandet pottery was the ceramic production made in the town of Castandet (Landes, France), between the 15th and 20th centuries, mainly for utilitarian purposes.

== History ==
Since the Middle Ages, three hamlets in Castandet, near Mont-de-Marsan, have been devoted to pottery as a means of exploiting the clay and marl in lands that were not very suitable for cultivation. Unlike other sites, the Castandet workshops did not specialise in the manufacture of a particular type of object : there, terracotta, along a minor touch of glaze, was used to make dishes and utensils for preparing, cooking or storing food or water, household items for hygiene or lighting, and tools for agricultural or craft work. This proto-industry, which encompassed an entire community, kept the peasants busy for part of the year, with the rest devoted to work in the fields or vineyards — some managed to make a living from pottery alone.

The commercial heyday of Castandet pottery came in the 18th century, with around sixty workshops. These products were sold at markets and fairs throughout the Landes region and beyond, and their use is well documented in much of Gascony. Competition from faience and less expensive regional earthenware products then affected the village's activity. The social situation of the potters deteriorated in the 19th century. The emergence of new metallic and plastic materials took their toll on utilitarian ceramics. The potters survived by making pots for resin extraction and artistic works until the middle of the 20th century, marking the total decline of the Castandet centre. After a period of neglect, the history of this local craft was rediscovered and studied from the 1980s onwards. A museum dedicated to Castandet pottery opened in September 2024.

== Sources ==
About Castandet

- Jean Pémartin (1987). "La poterie de Castandet". Bulletin de la société de Borda (in French). Dax: 209-221.
- Castandet, un village de potiers (in French). Castandet: Les Amis du Patrimoine Castandétois. 1996.
- Aurélie Mercé (2002). Castandet et sa production potière (XVII-XIX^{èmes} siècles) (archival inventory) (in French). Toulouse: university of Toulouse-II-Le Mirail.
- Alain Costes; Christian Belot; Liliane Deschamps; Nicole Gourdon-Platel; Claudine Mimbielle; et al. (2012). Toupiès et toupins, potiers et poteries, XV-XX^{èmes} siècles : Castandet, un centre potier landais. Documents de La Grésale (in French). Mont-de-Marsan: Groupe de recherche en ethnographie et céramologie en Aquitaine et Midi toulousain (GRECAM). ISBN 9782954122601.
- Guy Duclos; Jeanne-Marie Fritz; Jean-Marie Graff (2012). Castandet, mémoire d'un village landais des origines à nos jours (in French). Orthez: GRECAM.

About pottery in and around the Landes

- La Poterie landaise d'hier et d'aujourd'hui (exhibition book) (in French). Mont-de-Marsan: archives départementales des Landes. 1983. BnF 34712222
- Claire Hanusse (1988). Potiers et tuiliers des Landes, inventaire des sites de productions du XIX^{ème} au XX^{ème} siècle (in French). cellule du patrimoine industriel, Ministry of Culture.
- Catherine Ballarin (1998). Gérard Louise (ed.). La céramique de l'espace landais au Moyen-Âge et à l'époque moderne (Master in History thesis) (in French). Bordeaux: university Bordeaux-III. SUDOC 201196557
- Musée de la Faïence et des Arts de la table de Samadet (pdf) (brochure guide). Samadet. 2010s. p. 6.
- Alain Costes (1998). Approches de la poterie du Midi toulousain et de la Gascogne (XVI-XX^{èmes} siècles) (Thesis). La Grésale hors-série No. 1 (in French). GRECAM. ISSN 1969-2935.

General

- Alain Bavoux (1983). Potiers et poteries : témoignage photographique de la carte postale (in French). Corlet. EAN 9782854800524
- Jean Cuisenier (1987). L'art populaire en France (in French). Arthaud. ISBN 2700305639.
- Odette Chapelot; Jean Chapelot (2000). "L'artisanat de la poterie et de la terre cuite architecturale : un moyen de connaissance des sociétés rurales du Moyen Âge". In Mireille Mousnier (ed.). L'artisan au village : dans l'Europe médiévale et moderne (in French). Toulouse: Presses universitaires du Midi. p. 87-147. ISBN 2858165351.
