= October 1946 French constitutional referendum in Chad–Ubangi-Shari =

A constitutional referendum was held in Chad and Ubangi-Shari on 13 October 1946 as part of the wider French constitutional referendum. The proposed new constitution was rejected by 77% of voters, with a turnout of 64%. However, the constitution was approved by a majority of voters in the overall results.

== Results ==
| Choice | Votes | % |
|---|---|---|
| For | 246 | 22.69 |
| Against | 838 | 77.31 |
| Total | 1,084 | 100.00 |
| Valid votes | 1,084 | 98.46 |
| Invalid/blank votes | 17 | 1.54 |
| Total votes | 1,101 | 100.00 |
| Registered voters/turnout | 1,708 | 64.46 |
Source: Sternberger et al.
