= October 1946 French constitutional referendum in French Sudan–Niger =

A constitutional referendum was held in French Sudan and Niger on 13 October 1946 as part of the wider French constitutional referendum. The proposed new constitution was rejected by 45% of voters in the two territories, but approved by 57.4% of the overall vote. Voter turnout was 51%.

== Results ==
Choice	Votes	%
For	859	45.5
Against	1,029	54.5
Invalid/blank votes	33	–
Total	1,921	100
Registered voters/turnout	3,749	51.2
Source: Sternberger et al.
