= October 1946 French constitutional referendum in French Somaliland =

A constitutional referendum was held in French Somaliland on 13 October 1946 as part of the wider French constitutional referendum. Although the proposed new constitution was rejected by 73% of voters in the territory, it was approved 53% of voters overall.

== Results ==
Choice	Votes	%
For	148	26.6
Against	408	73.4
Invalid/blank votes	14	–
Total	570	100
Registered voters/turnout	874	65.2
Source: Sternberger et al.
