= May 1946 French constitutional referendum in French Sudan–Niger =

A constitutional referendum was held in French Sudan and Niger on 5 May 1946 as part of the wider French constitutional referendum. The proposed new constitution was rejected by 48% of voters in the two territories and by 53% of the overall vote. Voter turnout was 58%.

== Results ==
Choice	Votes	%
For	883	48.0
Against	958	52.0
Invalid/blank votes	82	–
Total	1,923	100
Registered voters/turnout	3,314	58.0
Source: Sternberger et al.
