= October 1946 French constitutional referendum in Tunisia =

- 13 October 1946

Results
Choice	Votes	%
Yes	10,688	27.14%
No	28,692	72.86%
Valid votes	39,380	99.42%
Invalid or blank votes	230	0.58%
Total votes	39,610	100.00%
Registered voters/turnout	81,257	48.75%

A constitutional referendum was held in Tunisia on 13 October 1946 as part of the wider French constitutional referendum. Although the new constitution was rejected by 73% of voters in Tunisia, it was approved by 53% of voters overall. Voter turnout was 48.7%.

== Results ==
Choice	Votes	%
For	10,688	27.1
Against	28,692	72.9
Invalid/blank votes	230	–
Total	39,610	100
Registered voters/turnout	81,257	48.7
Source: Sternberger et al.
