= October 1946 French constitutional referendum in Guinea =

Constitutional referendum held in Guinea in 1946

A constitutional referendum was held in Guinea on 13 October 1946 as part of the wider French constitutional referendum. Although the proposed new constitution was rejected by 54% of voters in the territory, it was approved 53% of voters overall.

== Results ==
Choice	Votes	%
For	563	46.3
Against	652	53.7
Invalid/blank votes	20	–
Total	1,235	100
Registered voters/turnout	2,310	53.5
Source: Sternberger et al.
