= Charles Despiau =

French sculptor (1874–1946)

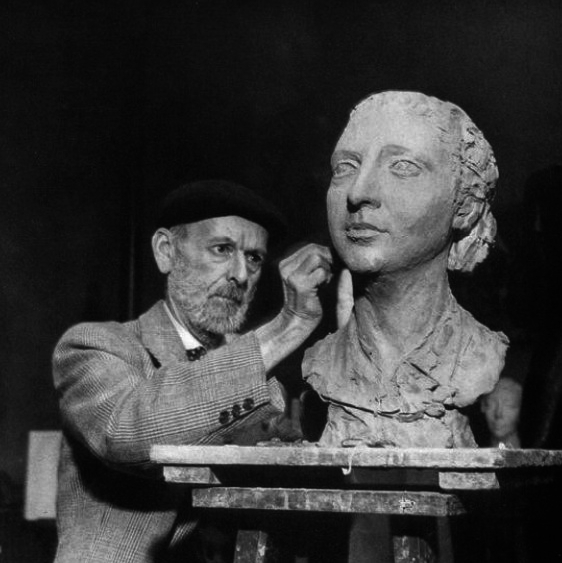
- Charles Despiau at work in 1930 in Paris
- Born: November 4, 1874; Mont-de-Marsan, Landes, France
- Died: October 30, 1946 (aged 71); Paris, France
- Occupations: Sculptor, teacher, illustrator, draftsman, graphic artist
- Known for: Bust sculpture

Charles Despiau (November 4, 1874 – October 30, 1946) was a French sculptor and teacher. He also worked as a draftsman, graphic artist and book illustrator.

== Early life ==
Charles-Albert Despiau was born at Mont-de-Marsan, Landes and attended first the École des Arts Décoratifs and later the École nationale supérieure des Beaux-Arts. He began exhibiting at the Salon des Artistes Français, from 1898 to 1900; then at the less academic Société Nationale des Beaux-Arts, where he showed from 1901 to 1921, and finally to the Salon des Tuileries, where he exhibited from 1923 to 1944.

== Career ==
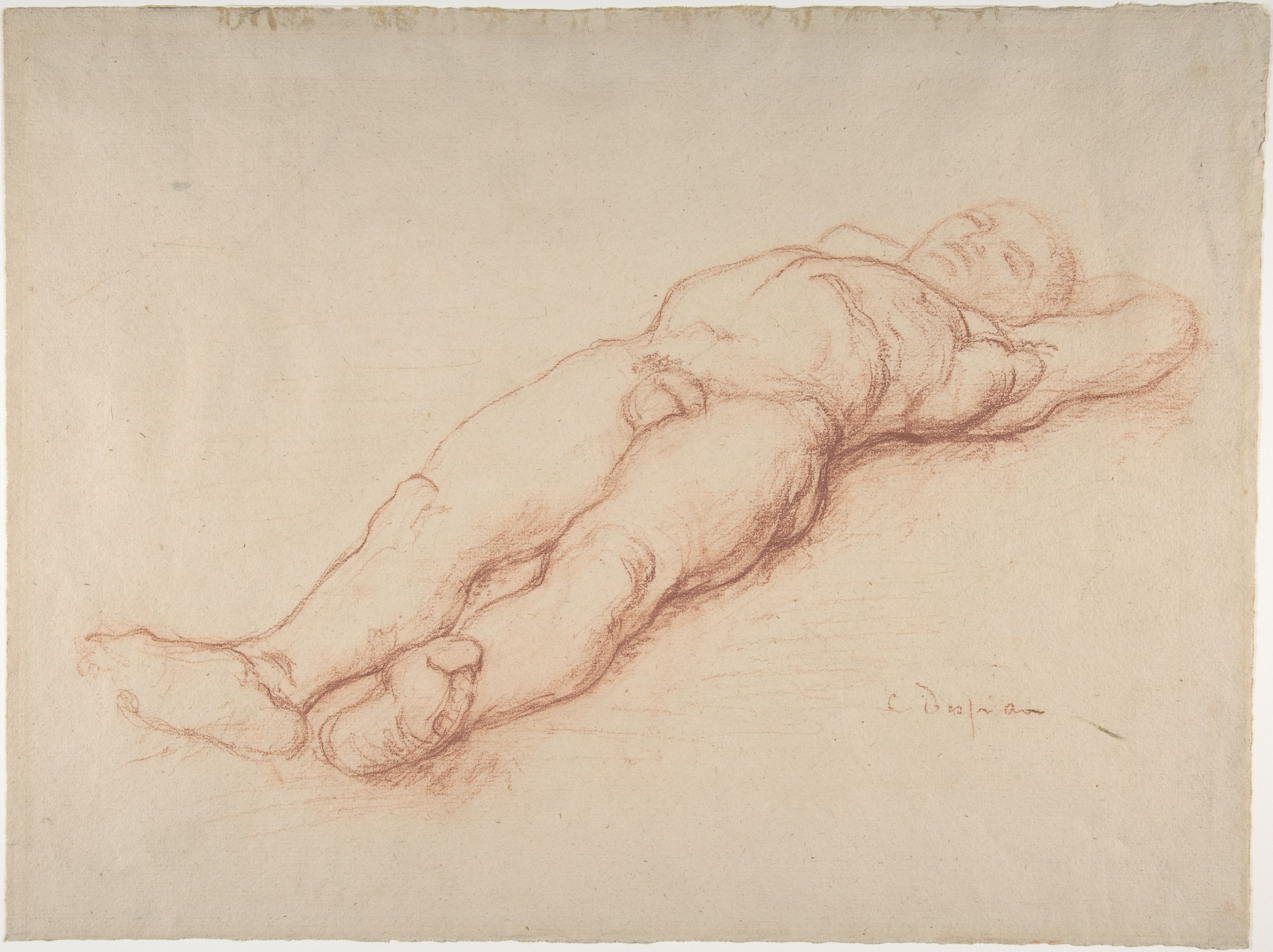
Recumbent Male Nude by Despiau at The Metropolitan Museum of Art

French sculptor Auguste Rodin hired him as an assistant in 1907. Despiau worked with Rodin, as well as doing his own sculpture. In 1914, he was drafted for service in the camouflage unit in World War I.

He taught sculpture classes for many years at Académie Scandinave in Paris. Returning to making sculpture after the war, his success was established with his one-man show at the Brummer Gallery in New York in late 1927.

He died on October 30, 1946, in Paris.

Despiau was not a prolific sculptor, preferring to work for as long as it took to realize his vision. There are several surviving plaster sculptures which repeat a model with only slight variations.

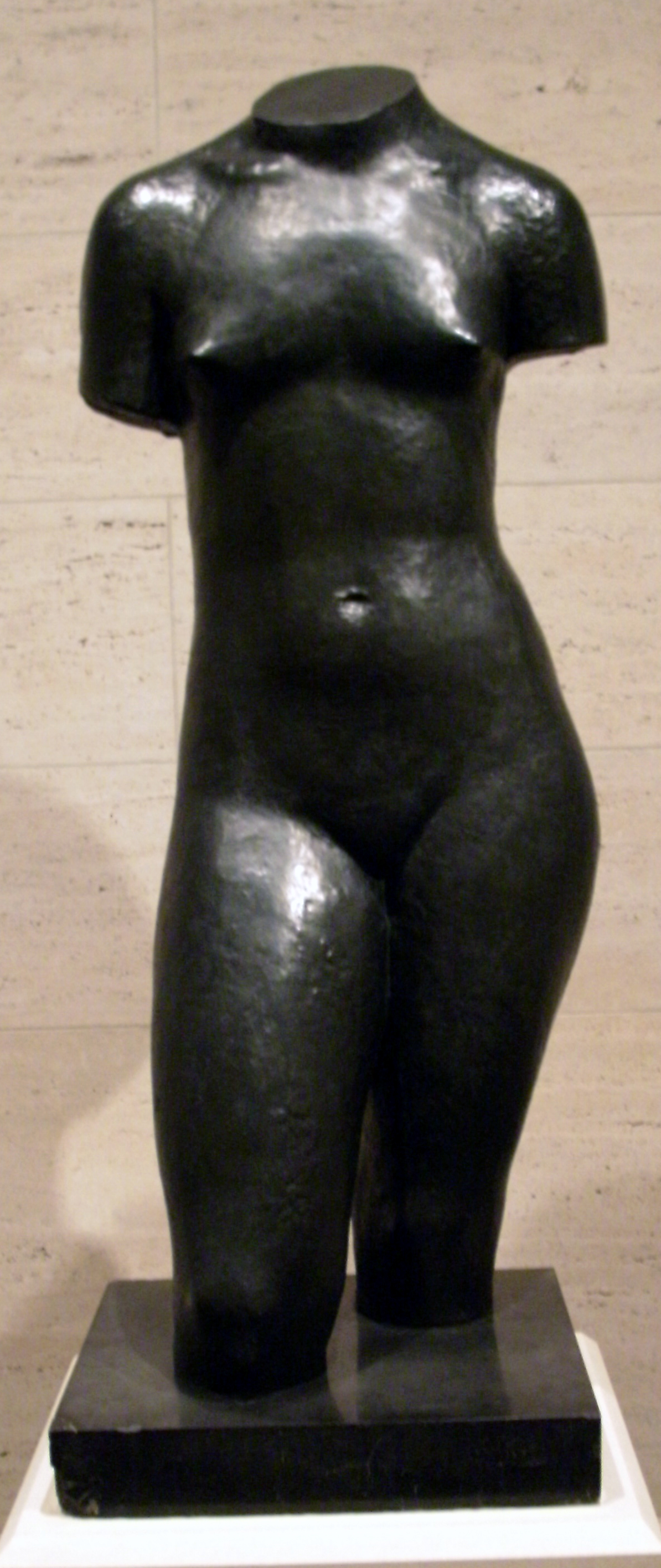
Adolescent Girl, bronze in the National Gallery of Art in Washington, D.C.

His works, mostly portraits and nudes exemplifying a calm classicism, are in the collections of over thirty museums in France and over 100 museums around the world, including the Metropolitan Museum of Art. The Museum of Modern Art in New York owns the bronze Assia, perhaps his best-known work.

The largest collection is in his native Mont-de-Marsan, in a museum he shares with Robert Wlérick, established in the Donjon Lacataye. Despiau produced a total of 150 sculptures and 1,000 drawings over a fifty-year career.
