= Castandet =

- Commune
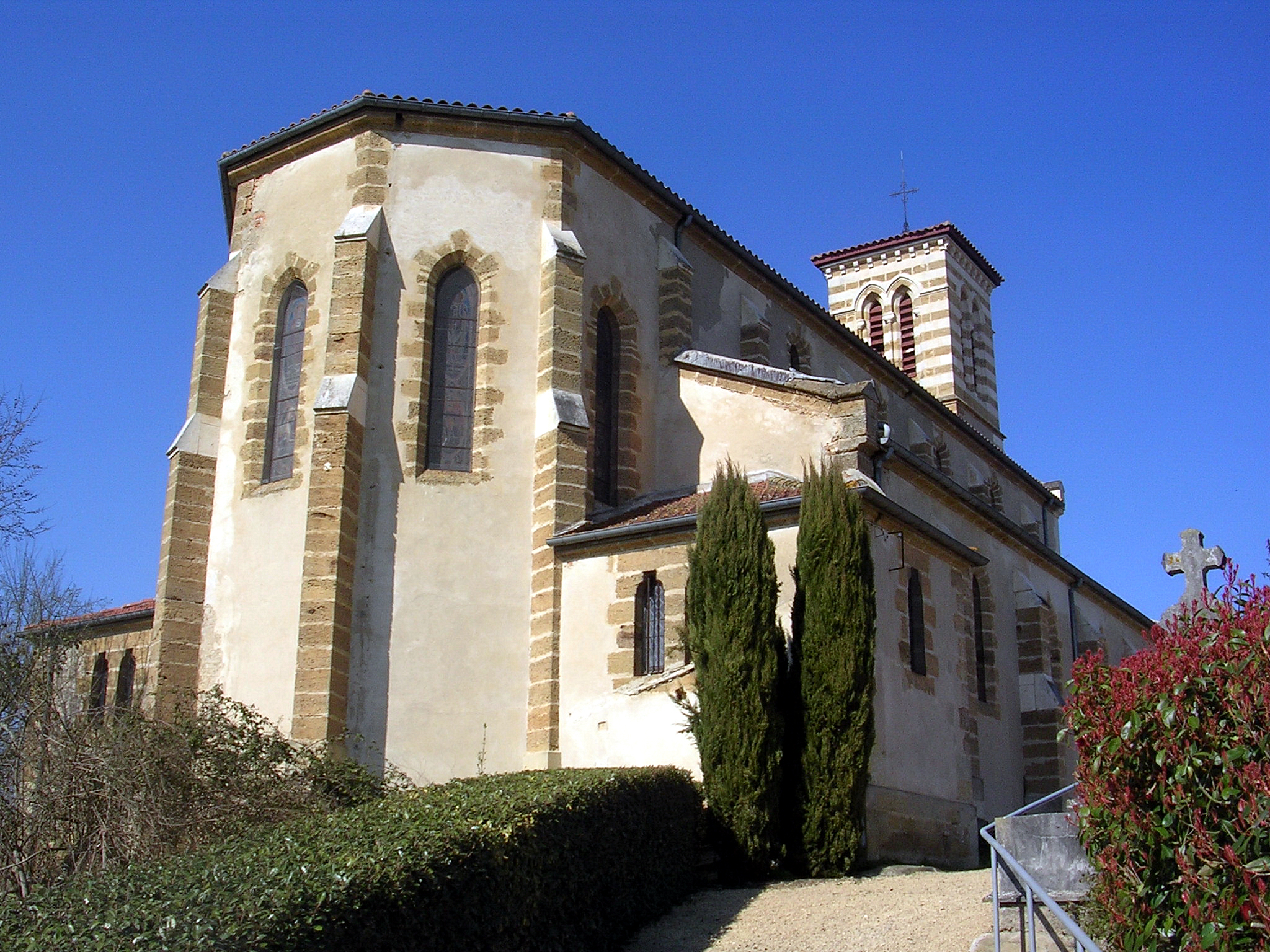
- Location of Castandet
- Location within France Location within Nouvelle-Aquitaine
- Coordinates: 43°48′29″N 0°20′28″W
- Country: France
- Region: Nouvelle-Aquitaine
- Department: Landes
- Arrondissement: Mont-de-Marsan
- Canton: Adour Armagnac
- Intercommunality: Pays Grenadois

Government
  - Mayor (2020–2026): Jean-Michel Duclave
- Area^{1}: 16.66 km^{2} (6.43 sq mi)
- Elevation: 110 m (360 ft)
- Highest elevation: 126 m (413 ft)
- Lowest elevation: 67 m (220 ft)
- Population (2023): 425
  - Density: 25.5/km^{2} (66.1/sq mi)
- Time zone: UTC+01:00 (CET)
  - Summer (DST): UTC+02:00 (CEST)
- INSEE/Postal code: 40070 /40270
- ^{1} French Land Register data, which excludes lakes, ponds, glaciers > 1 km^{2} (0.386 sq mi or 247 acres) and river estuaries.

Castandet (French pronunciation: [kastɑ̃dɛ]) is a commune in the Landes department in Nouvelle-Aquitaine in southwestern France. For centuries, it was an important village of potters, whose products — tableware or utensils, household items and tools for agricultural or craft work — were sold in much of Gascony.

== Population ==
Historical population
| Year | Pop. | ±% p.a. |
|---|---|---|
| 1968 | 433 | — |
| 1975 | 397 | −1.23% |
| 1982 | 384 | −0.47% |
| 1990 | 375 | −0.30% |
| 1999 | 413 | +1.08% |
| 2007 | 408 | −0.15% |
| 2012 | 402 | −0.30% |
| 2017 | 398 | −0.20% |
| 2023 | 425 | +1.10% |
Source: INSEE

== See also ==
- Communes of the Landes department

=== Sources ===
- Castandet, un village de potiers (in French). Castandet: Les Amis du Patrimoine Castandétois. 1996.
- Guy Duclos; Jeanne-Marie Fritz; Jean-Marie Graff (2012). Castandet, mémoire d'un village landais des origines à nos jours (in French). Groupe de recherche en ethnographie et céramologie en Aquitaine et Midi toulousain.
