= May 1946 French constitutional referendum in Guinea =

A constitutional referendum was held in Guinea on 5 May 1946 as part of the wider French constitutional referendum. The proposed new constitution was rejected by 51% of voters in the territory, and 53% of voters overall.

== Results ==
Choice	Votes	%
For	491	49.5
Against	500	50.5
Invalid/blank votes	31	–
Total	1,022	100
Registered voters/turnout	1,910	53.5
Source: Sternberger et al.
