= May 1946 French constitutional referendum in Cameroon =

A constitutional referendum was held in French Cameroons on 5 May 1946 as part of the wider French constitutional referendum. The proposed new constitution was rejected by 81% of voters in the territory, and 53% of voters overall.

== Results ==
Choice	Votes	%
For	207	19.2
Against	869	80.8
Invalid/blank votes	19	–
Total	1,095	100
Registered voters/turnout	2,136	51.3
Source: Sternberger et al.
