= May 1946 French constitutional referendum in Tunisia =

A constitutional referendum was held in Tunisia on 5 May 1946 as part of the wider French constitutional referendum. The new constitution was rejected by 64% of voters in Tunisia and 53% of voters overall. Voter turnout was 59.2%.

== Results ==
Choice	Votes	%
For	16,200	36.26
Against	28,480	63.74
Total	44,680	100.00
Valid votes	44,680	98.69
Invalid/blank votes	595	1.31
Total votes	45,275	100.00
Registered voters/turnout	76,424	59.24
Source: Sternberger et al.
