= Evangelical Baptist Convention of Argentina =

Baptist Christian denomination in Argentina

- Convención Evangélica Bautista Argentina
- Classification: Evangelical Christianity
- Theology: Baptist
- Associations: Baptist World Alliance
- Headquarters: Buenos Aires, Argentina
- Origin: 1908
- Congregations: 1,216
- Members: 85,000
- Missionary organization: Agencia Misionera Internacional
- Aid organization: Red Nacional Amor en Acción
- Seminaries: International Baptist Theological Seminary in Buenos Aires
- Official website: confeba.org.ar

The Evangelical Baptist Convention of Argentina (Spanish: Convención Evangélica Bautista Argentina) also known as Evangelical Baptist Confederation (Spanish: Confederación Evangélica Bautista) is a Baptist Christian denomination in Argentina. It is affiliated with the Baptist World Alliance. The headquarters is in Buenos Aires.

== History ==
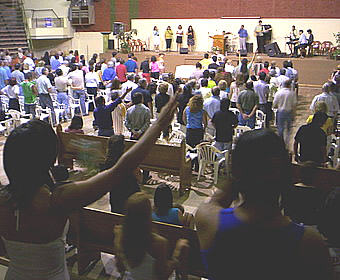
Worship service at Pueblo Nuevo Church of Bahía Blanca, affiliated to the Convention.

The Convention has its origins in the establishment of the Iglesia del Centro in Buenos Aires by Paul Besson (also known as Pablo Besson), a Swiss missionary in 1883 and an American mission of the International Mission Board in 1903. It is founded in 1908. According to a census published by the association in 2024, it claimed 1,216 churches and 85,000 members.

== School ==
The convention has an affiliated theological institute, the International Baptist Theological Seminary in Buenos Aires founded in 1953.

== Missionary organization ==
The Convention has a missionary organization, Agencia Misionera Internacional.

== Humanitarian organization ==
It has a humanitarian organization, Red Nacional Amor en Acción.

== See also ==
- Bible
- Born again
- Baptist beliefs
- Jesus Christ
- Believers' Church
