= October 1946 French constitutional referendum in Gabon–Moyen Congo =

1946 referendum in Gabon and Moyen Congo

A constitutional referendum was held in French Gabon and Moyen Congo on 13 October 1946 as part of the wider French constitutional referendum. Although the proposed new constitution was rejected by 72% of voters in the territory, it was approved by 53% of voters overall.

== Results ==
Choice	Votes	%
For	463	27.6
Against	1,215	72.4
Invalid/blank votes	14	–
Total	1,692	100
Registered voters/turnout	3,867	43.8
Source: Sternberger et al.

== See also ==
- French Fourth Republic
- Provisional Government of the French Republic
