= May 1946 French constitutional referendum in Ivory Coast =

A constitutional referendum was held in Ivory Coast (which included Upper Volta at the time) on 5 May 1946 as part of the wider French constitutional referendum. The proposed new constitution was rejected by 59% of voters in the territory, and 53% of voters overall.

== Results ==
Choice	Votes	%
For	768	41.1
Against	1,099	58.9
Invalid/blank votes	59	–
Total	1,926	100
Registered voters/turnout	3,836	50.1
Source: Sternberger et al.
