= October 1946 French constitutional referendum in Mauritania−Senegal =

A constitutional referendum was held in Mauritania and Senegal on 13 October 1946 as part of the wider French constitutional referendum. The proposed new constitution was approved by 92% of voters in the two territories and 57.4% of the overall vote. Voter turnout was 60%.

== Results ==
Choice	Votes	%
For	28,278	91.71
Against	2,557	8.29
Total	30,835	100.00
Valid votes	30,835	99.75
Invalid/blank votes	76	0.25
Total votes	30,911	100.00
Registered voters/turnout	53,859	57.39
Source: Sternberger et al.
