= May 1946 French constitutional referendum in Gabon–Moyen Congo =

1946 referendum in Gabon and Moyen Congo

A constitutional referendum was held in French Gabon and Moyen Congo on 5 May 1946 as part of the wider French constitutional referendum. The proposed new constitution was rejected by 64% of voters in the territory, and 53% of voters overall.

== Results ==
Choice	Votes	%
For	602	36.2
Against	1,063	63.8
Invalid/blank votes	43	–
Total	1,708	100
Registered voters/turnout	3,319	51.5
Source: Sternberger et al.
