= October 1946 French constitutional referendum in Cameroon =

Constitutional referendum held in French Cameroons

A constitutional referendum was held in French Cameroons on 13 October 1946 as part of the wider French constitutional referendum. Although the proposed new constitution was rejected by 74% of voters in the territory, it was approved 53% of voters overall.

== Results ==
Choice	Votes	%
For	316	25.9
Against	906	74.1
Invalid/blank votes	7	–
Total	1,229	100
Registered voters/turnout	2,428	50.6
Source: Sternberger et al.
