= May 1946 French constitutional referendum in Mauritania−Senegal =

A constitutional referendum was held in Mauritania and Senegal on 5 May 1946 as part of the wider French constitutional referendum. The proposed new constitution was approved by 92% of voters in the two territories, but was rejected by 53% of the overall vote. Voter turnout was 69%.

== Results ==
Choice	Votes	%
For	28,975	91.57
Against	2,666	8.43
Total	31,641	100.00
Valid votes	31,641	99.09
Invalid/blank votes	289	0.91
Total votes	31,930	100.00
Registered voters/turnout	46,075	69.30
Source: Sternberger et al.
