= May 1946 French constitutional referendum in French Somaliland =

A constitutional referendum was held in French Somaliland on 5 May 1946 as part of the wider French constitutional referendum. The proposed new constitution was rejected by 60% of voters in the territory, and 53% of voters overall.

== Results ==
Choice	Votes	%
For	112	39.7
Against	170	60.3
Invalid/blank votes	12	–
Total	294	100
Registered voters/turnout	826	35.6
Source: Sternberger et al.
