= May 1946 French constitutional referendum in Chad–Ubangi-Shari =

A constitutional referendum was held in Chad and Ubangi-Shari on 5 May 1946 as part of the wider French constitutional referendum. The proposed new constitution was rejected by 66% of voters, with a turnout of 60%.

== Results ==
Choice	Votes	%
For	311	34.06
Against	602	65.94
Total	913	100.00
Valid votes	913	96.82
Invalid/blank votes	30	3.18
Total votes	943	100.00
Registered voters/turnout	1,575	59.87
Source: Sternberger et al.
