= October 1946 French constitutional referendum in Ivory Coast =

A constitutional referendum was held in Ivory Coast (which included Upper Volta at the time) on 13 October 1946 as part of the wider French constitutional referendum. Although the proposed new constitution was rejected by 71% of voters in the territory, it was approved 53% of voters overall.

== Results ==
Choice	Votes	%
For	668	29.30
Against	1,612	70.70
Total	2,280	100.00
Valid votes	2,280	98.92
Invalid/blank votes	25	1.08
Total votes	2,305	100.00
Registered voters/turnout	4,442	51.89
Source: Sternberger et al.
