= Fernand Secheer =

French politician (1908–1988)

Fernand Secheer (24 January 1908 – 17 March 1988) was a French politician.

Secheer was born in Biaudos on 24 January 1908. He took office as a member of the National Assembly on 28 October 1965, following the death of Camille Dussarthou, and served until 2 April 1967, when he was succeeded by Henri Lavielle. Secheer died on 17 March 1988 in Bayonne.
