= May 1946 French constitutional referendum in Algeria =

A constitutional referendum was held in Algeria on 5 May 1946 as part of a wider French constitutional referendum. The proposed new constitution was rejected by 51.5% of voters, with a turnout of 71%.

== Results ==
| Choice | Votes | % |
|---|---|---|
| For | 175,049 | 48.5 |
| Against | 185,992 | 51.5 |
| Invalid/blank votes | 10,581 | – |
| Total | 371,622 | 100 |
| Registered voters/turnout | 523,584 | 71.0 |
Source: Sternberger et al.
