= John Beston =

English theological writer

- Died: 1428; Bishop's Lynn

John Beston (died 1428) was an English theological writer, prior of the Carmelite convent at Bishop's Lynn, was doctor in theology both of Cambridge and Paris, and was highly esteemed as a theologian and a philosopher, and also as a preacher.

In 1423, he was deputed to attend the Council of Sienna. He died at Bishop's Lynn in 1428. His name is in Latin variously written Bestonus, Bastonus, and Besodunus.

== Works ==
- Lecturæ Sacræ Scripturæ (one book)
- Sermones in Evangelia (one book)
- Sermones in Epistolas Apostolorum (one book)
- Compendium Theologiæ Moralis (one book)
- De Virtutibus et Vitiis oppositis (one book)
- Quæstiones Ordinariæ (one book)
- Super Universalia Roberti Holcothi (one book)
- Rudimenta Logices (one books)
- Epistolæ as diversos (two books)
- Sacræ Conciones (one book)
- De Trinitate *Determinationes (one book)

It is stated in Rose's 'Biographical Dictionary' that several of these are preserved in manuscript in the University Library at Cambridge, but no mention of them occurs in the published catalogue.
