= October 1946 French constitutional referendum in Dahomey and Togo =

A constitutional referendum was held in Dahomey (now Benin) and French Togoland on 13 October 1946 as part of the wider French constitutional referendum. The new proposed new constitution was rejected by 73% of voters, with a turnout of 47%. However, the constitution was approved by a majority of voters in the overall results.

== Results ==
Choice	Votes	%
For	212	27.18
Against	568	72.82
Total	780	100.00
Valid votes	780	96.77
Invalid/blank votes	26	3.23
Total votes	806	100.00
Registered voters/turnout	1,697	47.50
Source: Sternberger et al..
