= Bessone =

Bessone may refer to:

- Amo Bessone, American ice hockey player and coach.
- Ernesto Bessone, Argentine racing driver.
- Federico Bessone, Argentine footballer.
- Peter Bessone, American ice hockey player.
- Raymond Bessone, British celebrity hairdresser known as 'Mr Teasy-Weasy'.
- Max Bessone, Italian Designer, in New Zealand.

== See also ==
- Besson (surname)
