= October 1946 French constitutional referendum =

Referendum on the adoption of the French Fourth Republic constitution; passed

13 October 1946
- Outcome: Creation of the French Fourth Republic.

Results
Choice	Votes	%
Yes	9,297,470	53.24%
No	8,165,459	46.76%
Valid votes	17,462,929	98.15%
Invalid or blank votes	329,079	1.85%
Total votes	17,792,008	100.00%
Registered voters/turnout	26,311,643	67.62%

A constitutional referendum was held in France on 13 October 1946. Voters were asked whether they approved of a new constitution proposed by the Constituent Assembly elected in June. Unlike the May referendum, which saw a previous constitutional proposal rejected, the new Constitution of 27 October 1946 was accepted by 53% of voters, and brought the Fourth Republic into existence. Voter turnout was 68%.

== Results ==
Choice	Votes	%
For	9,297,470	53.24
Against	8,165,459	46.76
Total	17,462,929	100.00
Valid votes	17,462,929	98.15
Invalid/blank votes	329,079	1.85
Total votes	17,792,008	100.00
Registered voters/turnout	26,311,643	67.62
Source: Nohlen & Stöver

== See also ==
- October 1946 French constitutional referendum in Algeria
- October 1946 French constitutional referendum in Cameroon
- October 1946 French constitutional referendum in Dahomey and Togo
- October 1946 French constitutional referendum in Chad–Ubangi-Shari
- October 1946 French constitutional referendum in French Somaliland
- October 1946 French constitutional referendum in French Sudan−Niger
- October 1946 French constitutional referendum in Gabon–Moyen Congo
- October 1946 French constitutional referendum in Guinea
- October 1946 French constitutional referendum in Ivory Coast
- October 1946 French constitutional referendum in Mauritania−Senegal
- October 1946 French constitutional referendum in Tunisia
