= Pablo Besson =

Swiss missionary, linguist, and scholar

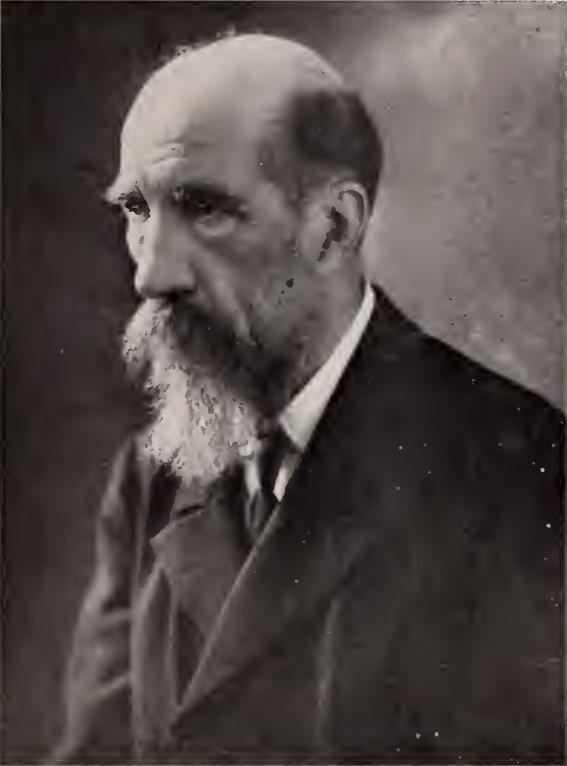
- Paul Besson at 70 years old
- Born: Paul-Henri Besson; 4 April 1848; Nods
- Died: 30 December 1932 (aged 84); Buenos Aires
- Education: Bachelor of Theology
- Alma mater: Leipzig University; University of Basel; University of Neuchâtel
- Occupation: Theologian

Paul-Henri Besson (4 April 1848 Nods, Switzerland - 30 December 1932 Buenos Aires, Argentina) was a Swiss Baptist missionary, biblical scholar, linguist, writer and historian. Paul Besson is considered the initiator of the Evangelical Baptist Convention of Argentina. He is known for his translation of the New Testament, the first in all of Latin America, from koine Greek into Spanish. Besson was recognized by the entire Argentine Protestant movement.

== Education ==
He studied at the Faculty of Theology at the University of Neuchâtel (1868). He returned to study at the University of Basel, to finish his degree in theology.

== Bibliography ==
- Pablo Besson (1894). Cartas sobre la reforma en España. Buenos Aires : Iimprenta, Calle Corrientes 716. OCLC 912421157.
- Pablo Besson (1895). Marcos Perez. Buenos Aires. OCLC 67947759.
- Pablo Besson (1910). El patronato eclesiástico. OCLC 718497243.
- Pablo Besson (1909). El nacimiento sobrenatural de Jesu-Cristo. OCLC 718654040.
- Pablo Besson (1910). La Inquisición en Buenos Aires. Buenos Aires, Impr. de J.H. Kidd. OCLC 237204598.
- Pablo Besson (1919). El Nuevo Testamento. Buenos Aires, Telleres gráficos "Schenone". OCLC 825105243.
- Pablo Besson (1948). El nuevo testamento de nuestro señor Jesucristo. Buenos Aires, Convención Evangélica Bautista. OCLC 3522811.

== Sources ==
- Santiago Canclini. "Pablo Besson: un heraldo de la libertad cristiana" (PDF). Buenos Aires: Junta de Publicaciones de la Convención Evangélica Bautista. LCCN 84237362. OCLC 18497989. Archived from the original (PDF) on 2020-11-04.
- Asociación Bautista Argentina de Publicaciones (1981). "Un Hombre, un pueblo: los Bautistas argentinos a cien años de la llegada de Pablo Besson". Buenos Aires: Argentina: Asociación Bautista Argentina de Publicaciones. OCLC 14701320.
- Orestes Marotta (1942). Recordando a don Pablo Besson. Buenos Aires: Junta Bautista de Publicaciones. OCLC 1051726723.
- Joe Tom Poe (1975). A critical examination of the Biblical thought of Pablo Besson (Ph.D. thesis). Baylor University. OCLC 23749900.
