= May 1946 French constitutional referendum in Dahomey and Togo =

A constitutional referendum was held in French Dahomey and French Togoland on 5 May 1946 as part of the wider French constitutional referendum. The new proposed new constitution was rejected by 55% of voters, with a turnout of 57%.

== Results ==
Choice	Votes	%
For	373	44.62
Against	463	55.38
Total	836	100.00
Valid votes	836	98.12
Invalid/blank votes	16	1.88
Total votes	852	100.00
Registered voters/turnout	1,502	56.72
Source: Sternberger et al.
