= October 1946 French constitutional referendum in Algeria =

A constitutional referendum was held in Algeria on 13 October 1946 as part of a wider French constitutional referendum. The proposed new constitution was rejected by 61.6% of voters, with a turnout of 58.5%. However, it was approved by a majority of voters in France and other territories.

== Results ==
Choice	Votes	%
For	117,378	38.4
Against	188,524	61.6
Invalid/blank votes	3,515	–
Total	305,902	100
Registered voters/turnout	529,034	58.5
Source: Sternberger et al.
