= May 1946 French constitutional referendum =

5 May 1946

Results
Choice	Votes	%
Yes	9,454,034	47.18%
No	10,584,359	52.82%
Valid votes	20,038,393	97.43%
Invalid or blank votes	528,985	2.57%
Total votes	20,567,378	100.00%
Registered voters/turnout	25,829,425	79.63%

A constitutional referendum was held in France on 5 May 1946. Voters were asked whether they approved of a new draft Constitution proposed by the Constituent Assembly elected in 1945 (the "Constitutional Bill of 19 April 1946").

The draft Constitution, approved by the Constituent Assembly on 19 April 1946, was supported by the Communists and the Socialists. It concentrated power in a unicameral Assembly and abolished the Senate of France.

Moderates, Radicals, and the Popular Republican Movement (MRP) campaigned against the referendum. The "No" coalition warned the voters against the danger of a "dictatorship" of an Assembly dominated by the Marxists, which could question the existence of private property. In the "Yes" coalition, the SFIO refused the Communist proposition of a common campaign.

The draft Constitution was rejected by 52.8% of voters, with a turnout of 79.6%. It was the first referendum in France in which the proposal put to voters was rejected.

As a result of the vote, the Constituent Assembly elected in 1945 was dissolved and fresh elections for a new Constituent Assembly were held on 2 June 1946. This second Constituent Assembly adopted a different draft Constitution on 29 September 1946. This second draft was submitted to the French people in the referendum of 13 October 1946 and was approved, resulting in the enactment of the Constitution of the French Fourth Republic, signed into law by the President of the Provisional Government on 27 October 1946.

== Results ==
Choice	Metropolitan France		Total	
Choice	Votes	%	Votes	%
For	9,109,771	47.0	9,454,034	47.2
Against	10,272,586	53.0	10,584,359	52.8
Invalid/blank votes	513,054	–	528,985	–
Total	19,895,411	100	20,567,378	100
Source: Nohlen & Stöver

== See also ==
- May 1946 French constitutional referendum in Algeria
- May 1946 French constitutional referendum in Cameroon
- May 1946 French constitutional referendum in Chad–Ubangi-Shari
- May 1946 French constitutional referendum in Dahomey and Togo
- May 1946 French constitutional referendum in French Somaliland
- May 1946 French constitutional referendum in French Sudan−Niger
- May 1946 French constitutional referendum in Gabon–Moyen Congo
- May 1946 French constitutional referendum in Guinea
- May 1946 French constitutional referendum in Ivory Coast
- May 1946 French constitutional referendum in Mauritania−Senegal
- May 1946 French constitutional referendum in Tunisia
