= Pierre Bosquet =

Marshal of France (1810–1861)

Marshal of France Pierre Bosquet
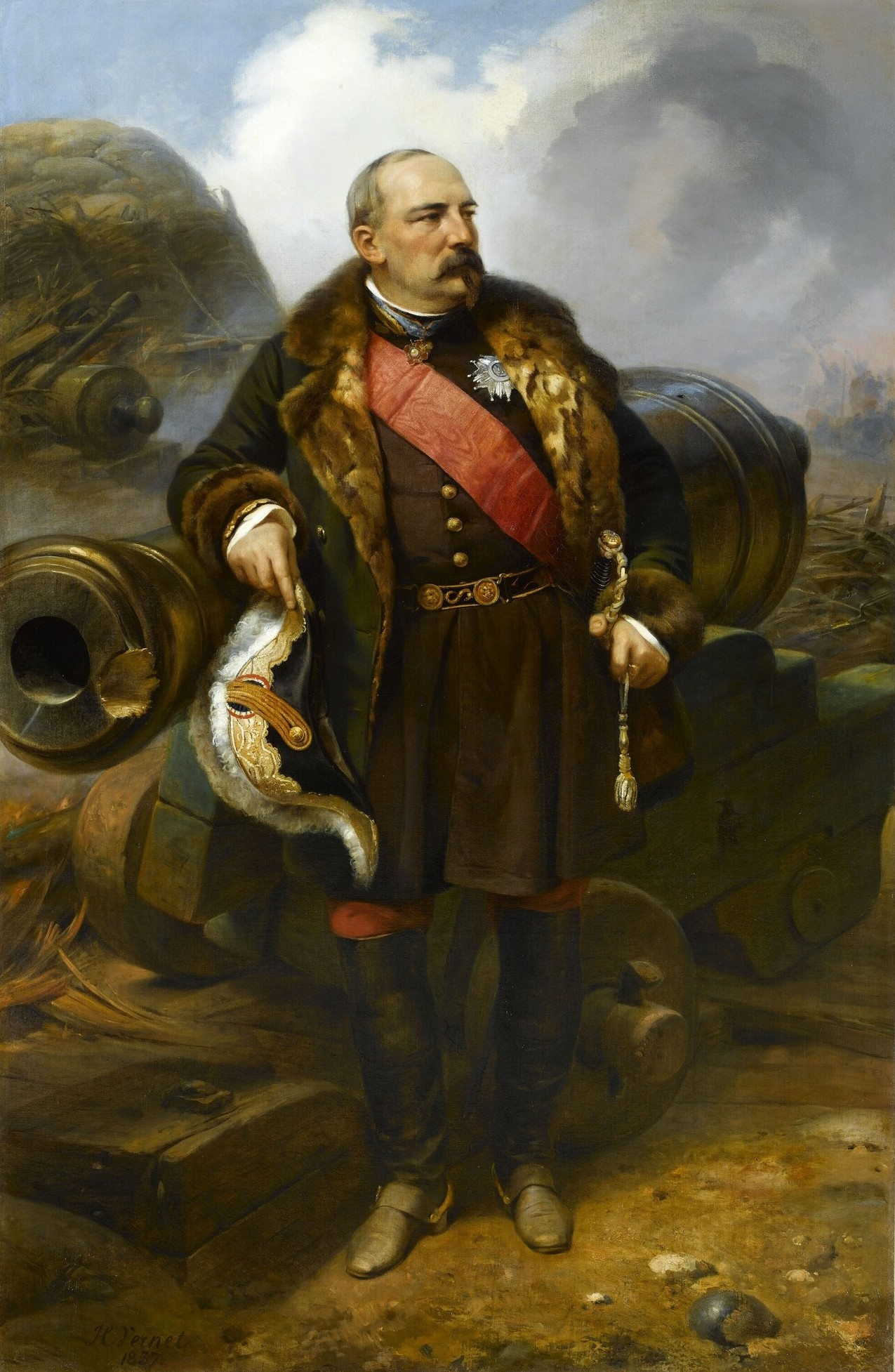
- Portrait of Pierre Bosquet by Horace Vernet, 1857
- Born: 8 November 1810; Mont-de-Marsan, France
- Died: 5 February 1861 (aged 50); Pau, France
- Military career
- Allegiance: France
- Branch: French Army
- Service years: 1833–1861
- Rank: General de division
- Commands: 2nd Infantry Division, Army of the Orient; II Corps, Army of the Orient
- Conflicts: Crimean War * Battle of Alma * Battle of Balaclava * Battle of Inkerman
- Awards: Marshal of France; Grand Cross of the Légion d’Honneur; Médaille militaire GCB; Order of the Medjidieh: 1st Class
- Other work: Senator

Pierre François Joseph Bosquet (French: [pjɛʁ bɔskɛ]; 8 November 1810 – 5 February 1861) was a French Army general. He served during the French conquest of Algeria and in the Crimean War of 1853-1856; returning from Crimea he was made a Marshal of France and a Senator.

== Biography ==
Bosquet was born in Mont-de-Marsan, Landes; he entered the artillery in 1833 and a year later went to Algeria. Here he soon made himself remarkable not only for technical skill but the moral qualities indispensable for high command. Becoming captain in 1839, he greatly distinguished himself at the actions of Sidi-Lakhdar and Oued-Melah. He was soon given the command of a battalion of native tirailleurs, and in 1843 was thanked in general orders for his brilliant work against the Flittahs.

Oriental Army of the Crimean campaign by Gustav Bartsch. From left to right: Admiral Ferdinand-Alphonse Hamelin, Lord Lucan, Lord Raglan, Admiral Dundas, Sir John Campbell, Duke of Cambridge, Lord Cardigan, Ismail Pasha, Omer Pasha, Muhlis Pasha (Grigore Sturdza), Sultan Abdülmecid I, Said-Bey (Vasile Obedeanu), Ahmed Pasha, col. Desmaret, Marshal Baraguey d'Hilliers, Prince Napoleon, col. Trochu, Marshal de Saint-Arnaud, general Bosquet, general de Canrobert

In 1845 he became lieutenant-colonel, and in 1847 colonel of a French line regiment. In the following year he was in charge of the Oran district, where his swift suppression of an insurrection won him further promotion to the grade of general of brigade, in which rank he went through the campaign of Kabylia, receiving a severe wound. In 1853 he returned to France after nineteen years' absence, a general of division.

Bosquet was amongst the earliest chosen to serve in the Crimean War, and at the Battle of Alma his division led the French attack. When the Anglo-French troops formed the siege of Sevastopol, Bosquet's corps of two divisions protected them against interruption. Referring to the Charge of the Light Brigade, Bosquet muttered the memorable line: C’est magnifique, mais ce n’est pas la guerre: c'est de la folie ("It is magnificent, but it is not war: it is madness"). His timely intervention at the Battle of Inkerman (5 November 1854) secured the victory for the allies. During 1855 Bosquet's corps occupied the right wing of the besieging armies opposite the Mamelon and Malakov. He himself led his corps at the storming of the Mamelon (7 June), and at the grand assault of 8 September he was in command of the whole of the storming troops. In the struggle for the Malakov he received another serious wound.

At the age of forty-five Bosquet, now one of the foremost soldiers in Europe, became a senator and a Marshal of France, but he was in poor health, and he lived only a few years longer. He was awarded the Knight Grand Cross of the Order of the Bath, the Grand Cross of the Légion d'honneur and the Order of the Medjidie 1st Class.

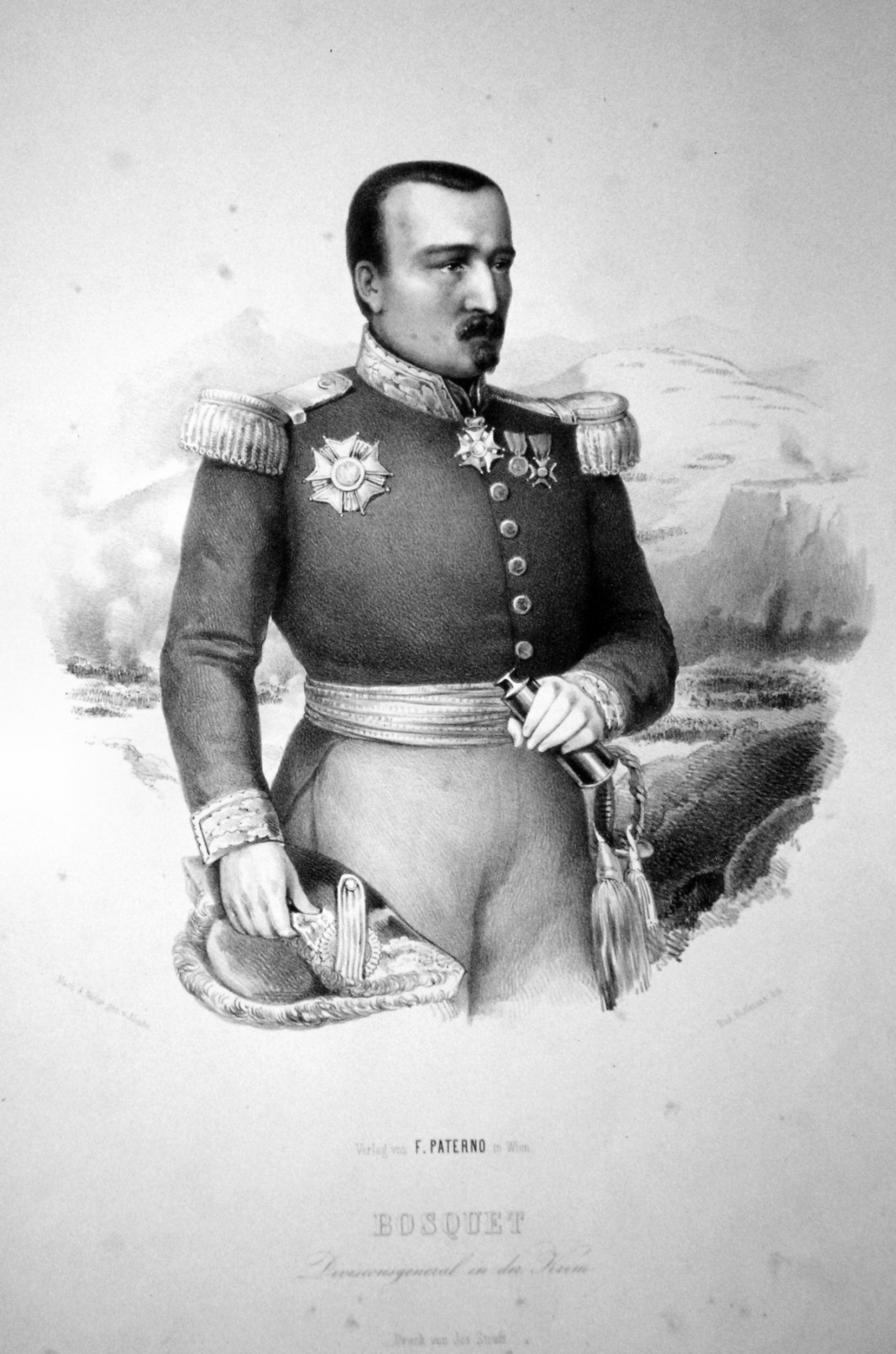
Général Bosquet, c. 1850

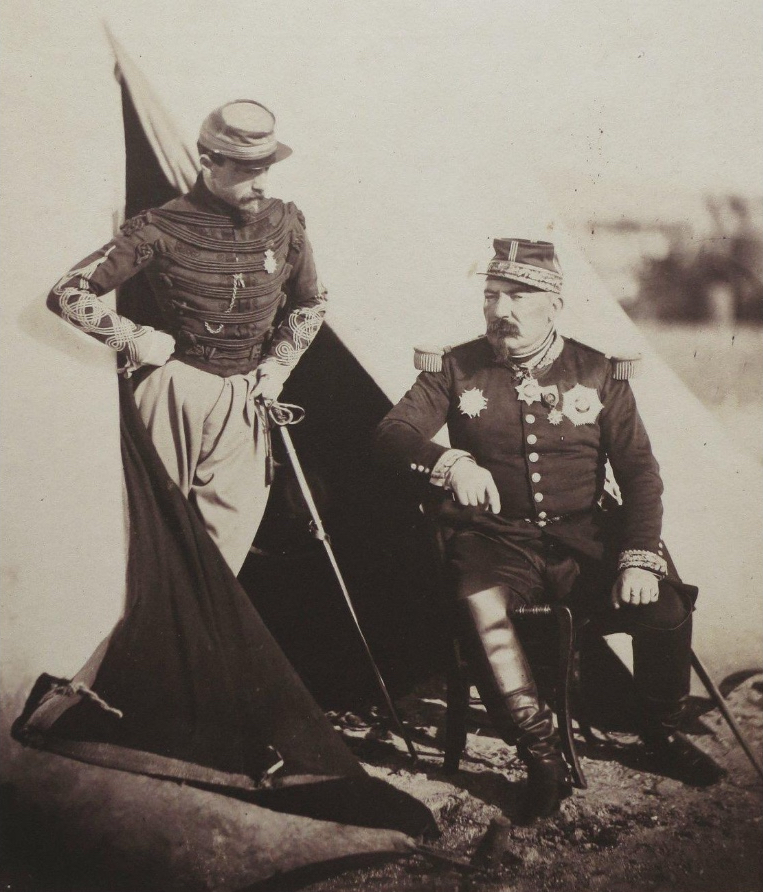
Général Bosquet (right) on February 29, 1856

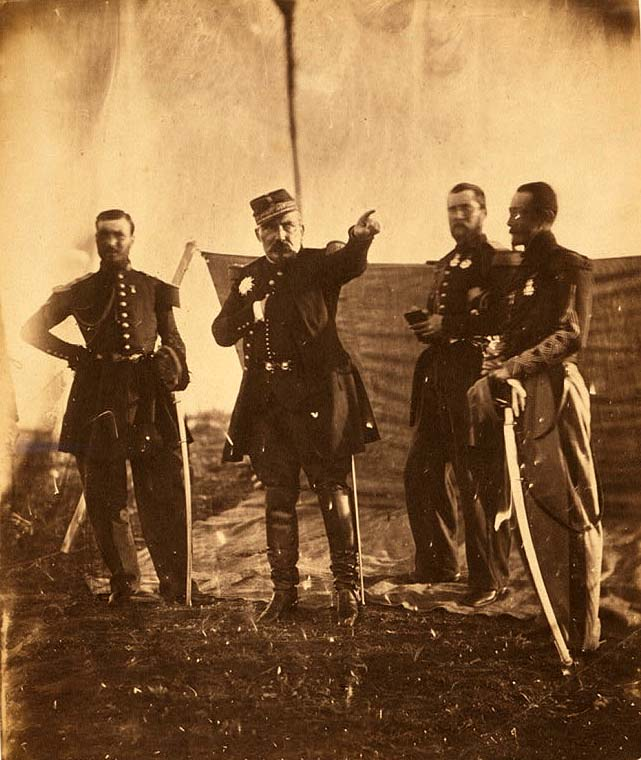
Général Bosquet with his staff, Crimea, c. 1855

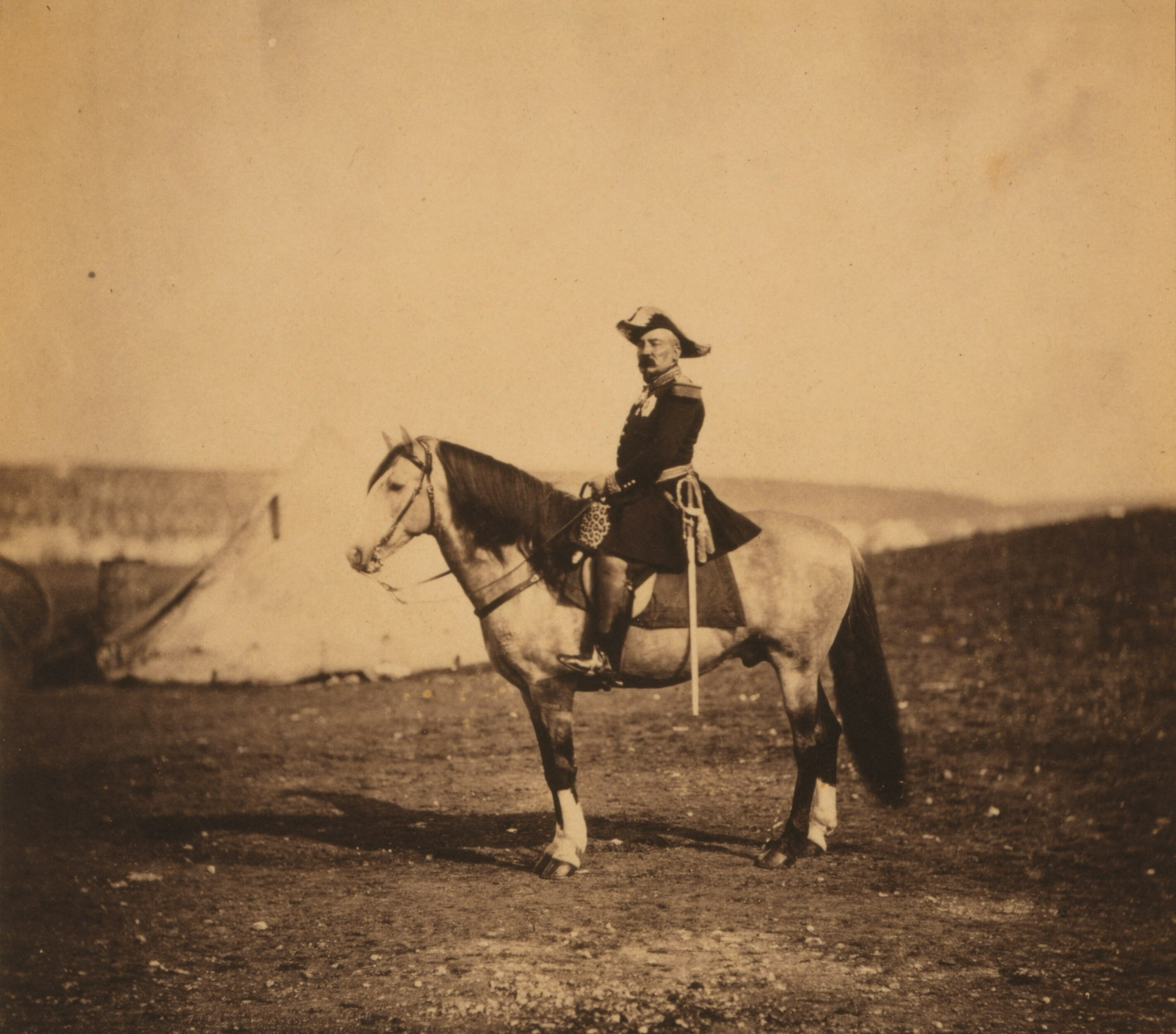
Général Bosquet on his horse, Bayard, Crimea, c. 1855

== Decorations ==
- Légion d'honneur
  - Knight (15 May 1838)
  - Officer (10 December 1849)
  - Commander (7 August 1851)
  - Grand Officer (21 October 1854)
  - Grand Cross (22 September 1855)
- Médaille militaire (1 November 1855)
- Honorary Knight Grand Cross of the Order of the Bath (UK) (3 January 1856)
- Crimea Medal (UK)
