= Samantha Besson =

Swiss-British legal academic (born 1973)

- Born: 30 March 1973 (age 53); Beirut, Lebanon
- Occupation: Law professor
- Known for: Chair of International Law of Institutions at the Collège de France (2019–present)

Samantha Besson (French pronunciation: [samɑ̃ta bɛsɔ̃]; born 30 March 1973) is a Swiss-British law professor specialising in public international law and European law. She holds the International Law of Institutions chair at the Collège de France in Paris and is a part-time professor at the University of Fribourg in Switzerland.

== Biography ==
Originally from the Vaud canton in Switzerland, Besson studied at the universities of Fribourg (Bachelor and Master's degree in 1996 and doctorate in 1999), Oxford (Magister Juris in 1998) and Bern (habilitation in Legal Theory and in Swiss, Comparative, European and International Constitutional Law in 2004). She then taught at Oxford University (2001–2003) and the University of Geneva (2001–2005), before becoming a professor at the University of Fribourg (since 2004). She has also been a visiting professor at the Universities of Zurich (2007–2010), Duke (2009), Lausanne (2010), Lisbon (2010–2019), Harvard (2014), Pennsylvania (2019) and Columbia Law School (2024).

From 2011 to 2012, she was a Research Fellow at the Wissenschaftskolleg zu Berlin. She has taught in various capacities at The Hague Academy of International Law (2009–2013; 2013; 2020). She was a member of the Scientific Council of the Nantes Institute for Advanced Study Foundation up until 2021, and is currently a member of the Board of the Swiss Academy of Human and Social Sciences, and was the first delegate for Human Rights at the Swiss Academies of Sciences. She is also the co-chair of the ILA Study Group on the International Law of Regional Institutions, and an associate member of the Institute of International Law since 2021. Samantha Besson has also been a member of the Board of the Swiss Society of International Law since 2022.

In 2019, she was elected at the Collège de France (only woman out of twelve nominations) as holder of the Chair "Droit international des institutions" (The International Law of Institutions). Her inaugural lecture took place on 3 December 2020, and was titled "Reconstruire l'ordre institutionnel international" (Reconstructing the International Institutional Order).

Besson's research interests lie at the intersection of general International Law and legal philosophy, and in particular: international and European human rights law; international and European law on sources and responsibility; comparative domestic, regional and European Union external relations law; international and European citizenship law and democratic theory.

In 2021, she was named Chevalière de l'Ordre national de la Légion d'honneur. In 2024, Besson was awarded an honorary doctorate by the Catholic University of Louvain.

In 2026, she was elected to the American Philosophical Society.

== Selected works ==
A full bibliography is regularly updated on the Collège de France website, and a certain number of articles are accessible online.

- Samantha Besson (ed) (2023). Consenting to International Law (in English). Cambridge, Cambridge University Press. p. 362. ISBN 9781009406444
- Samantha Besson (ed) (2022). Inventer l'Europe (in French). Paris, Odile Jacob. p. 288. ISBN 978-2-415-00325-8
- Samantha Besson (ed) (2022). Theories of International Responsibility Law (in English). Cambridge: Cambridge University Press. p. 400. ISBN 9781009208550
- Samantha Besson (2021). Reconstruire l'ordre institutionnel international: Leçons inaugurales du Collège de France (in French). Paris: Collège de France/Fayard. ISBN 9782213718040.
  - English version: Samantha Besson (2021). Reconstructing the International Institutional Order: Inaugural Lectures of the Collège de France. OpenEdition Books/Collège de France.
  - German version: Samantha Besson (2022). Zum Wiederaufbau der internationalen Institutionenordnung. Translation by O. Ammann and D. Wohlwend. Beiträge zum Völkerrecht. Basel: Helbing Lichtenhahn & Baden-Baden: Nomos.
- Samantha Besson (2020). La due diligence en droit international (in French). Leiden: Brill Nijhoff. p. 432. ISBN 978-90-04-44505-5.
  - English version: Samantha Besson (2023). Due Diligence in International Law. Translation by S. Knuchel. Special Collection of the Hague Academy of International Law, Leiden/Boston: Brill/Nijhoff 2023. p. 242 pages. ISBN 978-90-04-53865-8.
- Samantha Besson, Samuel Jubé (eds) (2020). Concerter les civilisations - Mélanges en l'honneur d'Alain Supiot (in French). Paris: Seuil. p. 496. ISBN 978-2021440577.
- Samantha Besson, Andreas R. Ziegler (2020). Traités internationaux (et droit des relations extérieures de la Suisse) (in French). Berne: Stämpfli. p. 1808. ISBN 978-3-7272-2612-0.
- Samantha Besson, Yves Mausen, Pascal Pichonnaz (eds) (2019). Le consentement en droit (in French). Paris: LGDJ. p. 374. ISBN 9783725587070
- Samantha Besson (2019). Droit international public (in French). Berne: Stämpfli. p. 827. ISBN 978-3-7272-1394-6.
- Samantha Besson (2019). Droit constitutionnel européen: Précis de droit et résumés de jurisprudence (in French). Berne: Stämpfli. p. 520. ISBN 978-3-7272-1395-3.
- Samantha Besson, Jean D'Aspremont (eds) (2018). The Oxford Handbook of the Sources of International Law (in English). Oxford: Oxford University Press. p. 1232. ISBN 978-0-1987-4536-5.
- Samantha Besson, Nicolas Levrat (eds) (2017). International Responsibility. Essays in Law, History and Philosophy (in English). Zürich: Schulthess. p. 258. ISBN 978-3-7255-8598-4.
- Samantha Besson, Nicolas Levrat, Pola Cebulak (eds) (2015). L'Union européenne et le droit international= The European Union and international law (in French). Genève; Zurich; Bâle / Paris: Schulthess / LGDJ. p. 248. ISBN 9783725585502.
- Samantha Besson, Andreas R. Ziegler (eds) (2014). Egalité et non-discrimination en droit international et européen (Multilingual). Zürich: Schulthess. p. 238. ISBN 978-3-7255-7053-9.
- Samantha Besson, Eva Maria Belser (eds) (2014). La Convention européenne des droits de l'homme et les cantons / Die Europäische Menschenrechtskonvention und die Kantone (in German). Zürich: Schulthess. p. 348. ISBN 978-3-7255-6792-8.CS1
- Samantha Besson, Stephan Breitenmoser, Marco Sassoli, Andreas R. Ziegler (2013). Völkerrecht - Droit international public. Aide-mémoire (in German). Zürich: Dike. p. 436. ISBN 978-3-03751-581-5.
- Samantha Besson, Andreas R. Ziegler (eds) (2013). Le juge en droit européen et international / The Judge in European and International Law (in French). Zürich: Schulthess. p. 343. ISBN 978-3-7255-6832-1.
- Samantha Besson, Nicola Levrat (eds) (2012). (Dés)ordres juridiques européens /European Legal (Dis)orders (in French). Zürich: Schulthess. p. 290. ISBN 978-3-7255-6613-6.
- Samantha Besson (ed) (2011). La Cour européenne des droits de l'homme après le Protocole 14 / The European Court of Human Rights after Protocol 14 (in French). Zürich: Schulthess. p. 248. ISBN 978-3-7255-6310-4.
- Samantha Besson, John Tasioulas (eds) (2010). The Philosophy of International Law (in English). Oxford: Oxford University Press. p. 626. ISBN 978-0-1992-0857-9.
- Samantha Besson, Jose Luis Marti (eds) (2009). Legal Republicanism: National and International Perspectives (in English). Oxford: Oxford University Press. ISBN 978-0-1995-5916-9.
- Samantha Besson, Jose Luis Marti (eds) (2006). Deliberative Democracy and its Discontents (in English). Routledge. p. 296. ISBN 978-1-1382-5714-6.
- Samantha Besson (2005). The Morality of Conflict: Reasonable Disagreement and the Law (in English). Oxford: Hart Publishing. p. 624. ISBN 978-1-84113-492-5.
- Samantha Besson (1999). L'égalité horizontale: l'égalité de traitement entre particuliers. Des fondements théoriques en droit privé suisse (in French). Fribourg: Editions Universitaires de Fribourg. p. 526. ISBN 978-2-8271-0848-0.
