= Marcel David =

French politician (1895–1979)

Marcel David (6 April 1895 – 19 December 1979) was a French politician.

== Biography ==
David was the son of an educator, born on 6 April 1895 in Le Meix-Saint-Epoing. After completing his studies in philosophy, David began working for a school in Mont-de-Marsan in 1940. That same year, he joined the French Resistance. In 1941, David became a member of a resistance group named Libération-Nord. After World War II had ended, David served as mayor of Mont-de-Marsan from 1945 to 1947, and thereafter was a member of the municipal council. He took office as a general councilor representing the canton of Mont-de-Marsan in September 1945, and was elected to the First and Second Constituent Assembly as a representative of the French Section of the Workers' International. David subsequently served on the first through third convocations of the National Assembly from 1946 to 1958. He died in Mont-de-Marsan on 19 December 1979.
