= Mont-de-Marsan =

Mont-de-Marsan Lo Mont de Marçan (Occitan)
- Prefecture and commune
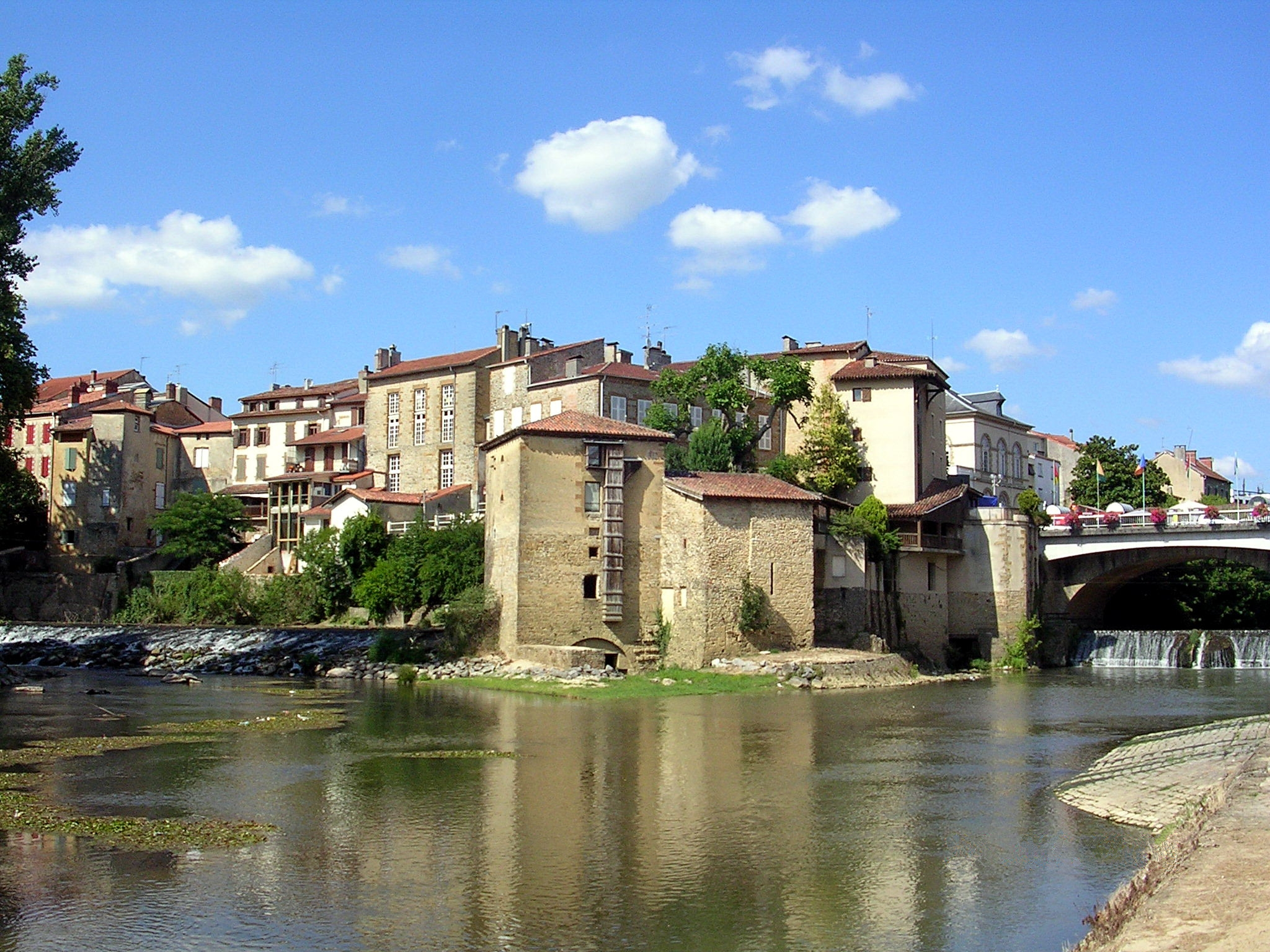
- Confluence of the Douze and Midou rivers

- Coat of arms
- Location of Mont-de-Marsan
- Location within France Location within Nouvelle-Aquitaine
- Coordinates: 43°53′N 0°30′W
- Country: France
- Region: Nouvelle-Aquitaine
- Department: Landes
- Arrondissement: Mont-de-Marsan
- Canton: Mont-de-Marsan-1 and 2
- Intercommunality: Mont-de-Marsan Agglomération

Government
  - Mayor (2020–2026): Charles Dayot
- Area^{1}: 36.88 km^{2} (14.24 sq mi)
- Elevation: 63 m (207 ft)
- Highest elevation: 97 m (318 ft)
- Lowest elevation: 23 m (75 ft)
- Population (2023): 31,592
  - Density: 856.6/km^{2} (2,219/sq mi)
- Demonym: Montois
- Time zone: UTC+01:00 (CET)
  - Summer (DST): UTC+02:00 (CEST)
- INSEE/Postal code: 40192 /40000
- Website: www.montdemarsan.fr
- ^{1} French Land Register data, which excludes lakes, ponds, glaciers > 1 km^{2} (0.386 sq mi or 247 acres) and river estuaries.

Mont-de-Marsan (French pronunciation: [mɔ̃ d(ə) maʁsɑ̃]; Occitan: Lo Mont de Marçan) is the prefecture of and a commune in the Landes department, Nouvelle-Aquitaine, Southwestern France.

== History ==
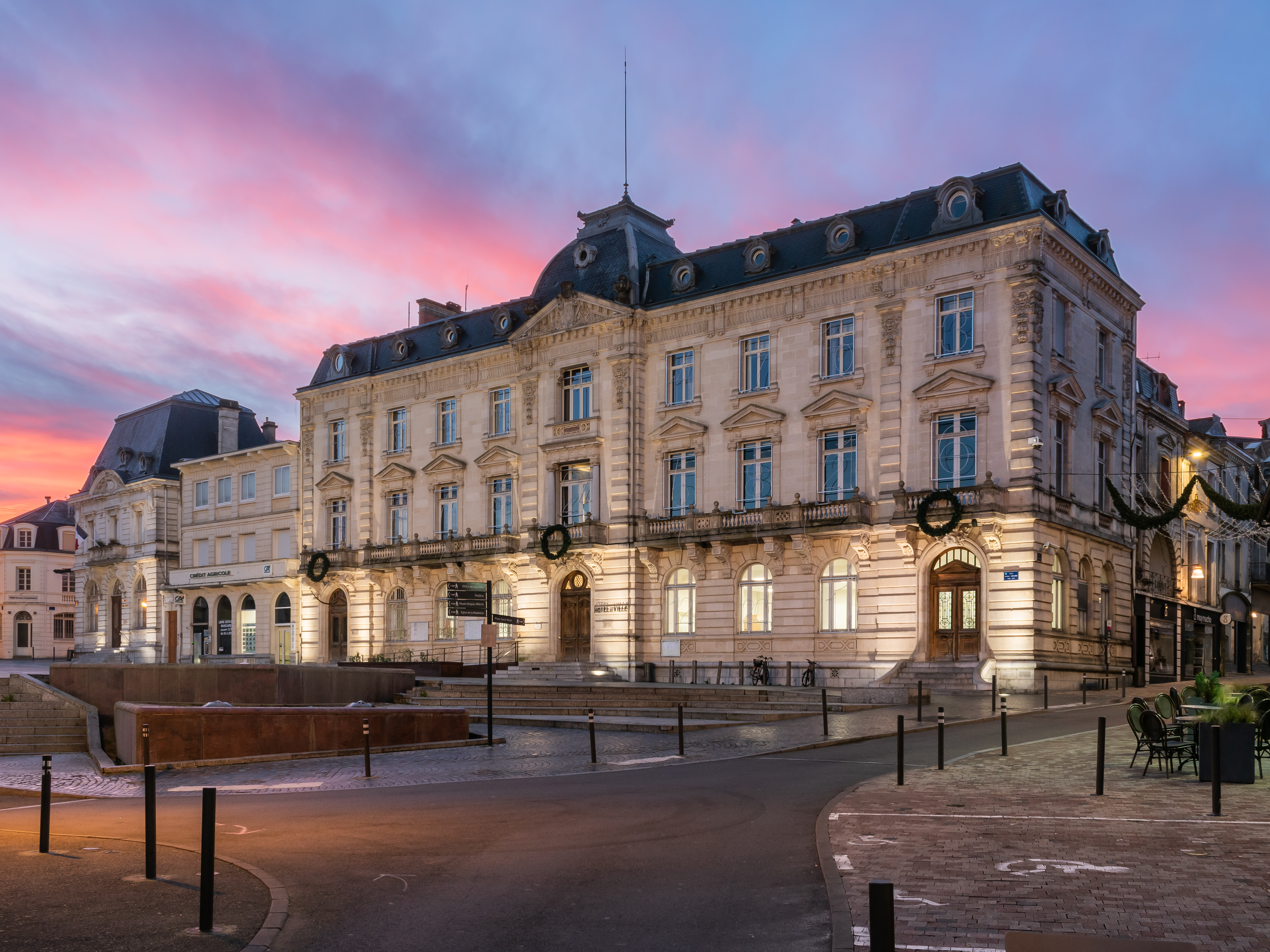
The Hôtel de Ville

The Hôtel de Ville was built as an officers' mess and completed in 1901.

== Population ==
Historical population

Year	Pop.	±% p.a.
1793	4,000	—
1800	2,866	−4.65%
1806	5,256	+10.64%
1821	3,065	−3.53%
1831	3,774	+2.10%
1836	4,082	+1.58%
1841	4,465	+1.81%
1846	4,684	+0.96%
1851	4,655	−0.12%
1856	5,210	+2.28%
1861	5,574	+1.36%
1866	8,455	+8.69%
1872	8,138	−0.63%
1876	9,310	+3.42%
1881	10,878	+3.16%
1886	11,760	+1.57%
1891	12,031	+0.46%
1896	11,274	−1.29%
1901	11,604	+0.58%

Year	Pop.	±% p.a.
1906	11,923	+0.54%
1911	12,091	+0.28%
1921	10,836	−1.09%
1926	12,134	+2.29%
1931	11,854	−0.47%
1936	13,009	+1.88%
1946	14,055	+0.78%
1954	17,120	+2.50%
1962	20,191	+2.08%
1968	24,444	+3.24%
1975	26,166	+0.98%
1982	27,326	+0.62%
1990	28,328	+0.45%
1999	29,489	+0.45%
2007	30,212	+0.30%
2012	31,018	+0.53%
2017	29,554	−0.96%
2023	31,592	+1.12%

Source: EHESS and INSEE (1968–2023)

== Military installations ==
The French Air and Space Force operates the Constantin Rozanoff Mont-de-Marsan Air Base about 2 kilometres north of the town. The base includes CEAM (the French air force military experimentation and trials organisation), an air defense radar command reporting centre and an air defence control training site. Mont-de-Marsan Air Base was formerly home to France's first operational squadron of nuclear bombers, the Dassault Mirage IVA.

== Sights ==
- The Donjon Lacataye is the keep of a 14th-century castle
- Despiau-Wlérick Museum (1930s sculpture by two local artists)
- Dubalen Museum
- Maréchal Foch's equestrian statue

== Culture ==
Stade Montois Club Omnisports is the city's main sports club: Stade Montois rugby and Stade Montois football are especially well-known. The city has around 9,000 sports licensees, which represents nearly 30% of its total population.

Two historic punk rock music festivals were held in Mont-de-Marsan's bullring in 1976 and 1977.

The Festival Arte Flamenco international festival was established 1989 in Mont-de-Marsan by the council of the Landes department and is the largest Flamenco festival outside of Spain.

== Economy ==
Overall, three sectors dominate the economic activity of Mont-de-Marsan:

- The agri-food sector: centered around poultry (duck, chicken, foie gras), and primarily corn, with major companies based here (Delpeyrat, Maïsadour...);
- The forestry sector: several companies contribute to the activities of the Industries and Future Maritime Pine competitiveness cluster;
- The Military Aeronautical Experimentation Center: the Mont-de-Marsan Air Base (BA 118) is one of the main operational bases for the French Air Force.

== Education ==
A campus of the University of Pau and the Adour Region is located in the town. It hosts research and teaching facilities of the College of Sciences and Technologies for Energy and the Environment.

== Personalities ==
- Joël Bats, association football goalkeeper (1957 – )
- Patrick Biancone, horse racing trainer, (1952 – )
- Pierre Bosquet, Marshal of France, (1810–1861)
- Thomas Castaignède, rugby union footballer, (1975 – )
- Charles Despiau, sculptor, (1874–1946)
- Pierre Gensous, trade unionist, (1925–2017)
- Alain Juppé, politician and former Prime Minister of France, (1945 – )
- Gaëtan Laborde, association football player, (1994 - )
- Romain Larrieu, association football goalkeeper (1976 – )
- Louis-Anselme Longa, painter, (1809–1869)
- Abdoulaye Loum, basketball player
- Jean van de Velde, golfer, (1966 – )
- Fabien Vehlmann, comics writer, (1972 – )
- Jeanne Viard, singer, (2003 – )
- Geneviève Darrieussecq, the mayor of Mont-de-Marsan (2008–2017) and since 2017 Secretary of State to the Minister of the Armed Forces, (1956 – )

== International relations ==
Mont-de-Marsan is twinned with:

- Tudela, Navarre, Spain
- Alingsås, Sweden

== Climate ==
Climate data for Mont-de-Marsan (1991–2020 normals, extremes 1945–present)
Month	Jan	Feb	Mar	Apr	May	Jun	Jul	Aug	Sep	Oct	Nov	Dec	Year
Record high °C (°F)	23.4 (74.1)	26.7 (80.1)	30.1 (86.2)	32.1 (89.8)	35.3 (95.5)	41.0 (105.8)	41.2 (106.2)	42.5 (108.5)	39.2 (102.6)	33.8 (92.8)	26.7 (80.1)	23.9 (75.0)	42.5 (108.5)
Mean daily maximum °C (°F)	10.9 (51.6)	12.7 (54.9)	16.4 (61.5)	18.7 (65.7)	22.3 (72.1)	25.5 (77.9)	27.8 (82.0)	28.2 (82.8)	25.0 (77.0)	20.4 (68.7)	14.4 (57.9)	11.4 (52.5)	19.5 (67.1)
Daily mean °C (°F)	6.5 (43.7)	7.2 (45.0)	10.3 (50.5)	12.7 (54.9)	16.3 (61.3)	19.6 (67.3)	21.6 (70.9)	21.8 (71.2)	18.5 (65.3)	14.8 (58.6)	9.7 (49.5)	7.0 (44.6)	13.8 (56.8)
Mean daily minimum °C (°F)	2.1 (35.8)	1.8 (35.2)	4.2 (39.6)	6.7 (44.1)	10.4 (50.7)	13.7 (56.7)	15.5 (59.9)	15.4 (59.7)	11.9 (53.4)	9.2 (48.6)	5.1 (41.2)	2.6 (36.7)	8.2 (46.8)
Record low °C (°F)	−19.8 (−3.6)	−16.8 (1.8)	−11.5 (11.3)	−5.4 (22.3)	−2.5 (27.5)	1.8 (35.2)	2.0 (35.6)	4.1 (39.4)	−0.5 (31.1)	−6.2 (20.8)	−10.4 (13.3)	−14.5 (5.9)	−19.8 (−3.6)
Average precipitation mm (inches)	82.2 (3.24)	61.8 (2.43)	68.6 (2.70)	87.7 (3.45)	79.1 (3.11)	73.0 (2.87)	55.4 (2.18)	59.7 (2.35)	72.6 (2.86)	85.4 (3.36)	105.1 (4.14)	87.5 (3.44)	918.1 (36.15)
Average precipitation days (≥ 1.0 mm)	11.4	9.6	10.2	11.8	10.9	9.1	6.9	7.3	8.8	9.8	11.9	11.0	118.7
Average snowy days	1.2	1.2	0.5	0.1	0.0	0.0	0.0	0.0	0.0	0.0	0.4	0.9	4.3
Average relative humidity (%)	88	84	77	76	75	75	73	76	78	85	88	89	80.3
Mean monthly sunshine hours	88.8	113.9	165.4	174.1	195.9	213.7	232.9	226.3	199.2	149.5	97.3	85.2	1,942
Source 1: Meteociel
Source 2: Infoclimat.fr (humidity and snowy days, 1961–1990)

== See also ==
- André Abbal
- Bull-leaping
