= Die Gleichheit =

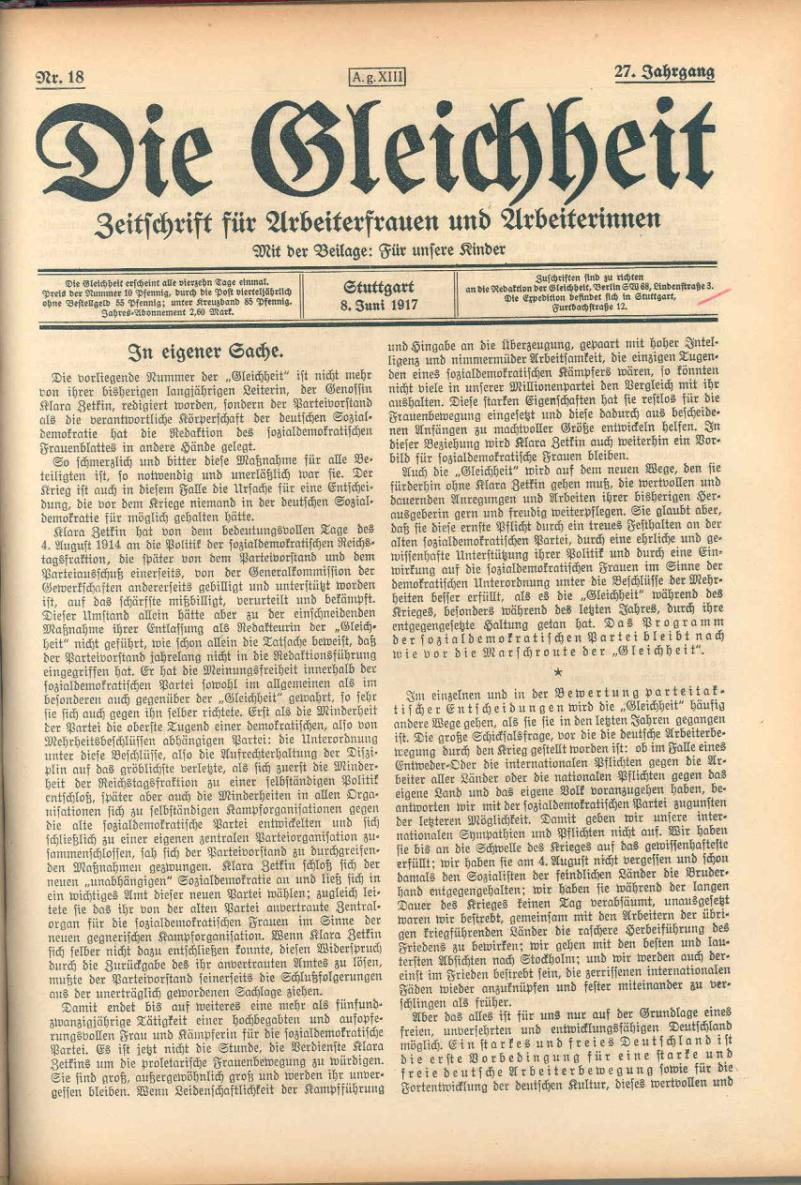
- Die Gleichheit 8 June 1917
- Discipline: Socialist
- Language: German
- Edited by: Clara Zetkin

Publication details
- Former name: Die Arbeiterin (The Worker),
- History: 1890–1923
- Frequency: Bi-monthly

Standard abbreviations
- ISO 4: Gleichheit

Die Gleichheit (Equality) was a Social Democratic bimonthly magazine issued by the women's proletarian movement in Germany from 1890 to 1923. For many years it was the official organ of the international women's socialist movement.

== Foundation ==
Die Gleichheit had appeared in early 1890 as Die Arbeiterin (The [female] Worker), a successor to the short-lived Die Staatsbürgerin (The Citizeness) founded by Gertrud Guillaume-Schack and banned in June 1886. Die Arbeiterin was published by the Social Democrat Emma Ihrer in Velten for more than a year from 1890 to 1891 with little success. In January 1892, with the magazine facing financial ruin, editorial direction was placed in the hands of Clara Zetkin (1857–1933) by Heinrich Dietz, the magazine's Social democrat-backing publisher. Zetkin renamed the paper Die Gleichheit when she took over.

== History ==
Zetkin edited Gleichheit until 1917. At the First International Conference of Socialist Women in Stuttgart, 1907 it was reported that the magazine had a distribution of 70,000 copies. The editorial board of Die Gleichheit was elected as the central organ of the Women's International Council of Socialist and Labour Organizations until the next international congress. By 1910 Die Gleichheit, the central socialist organ for women workers, had a circulation on 80,000. At the Second International Women's Conference in Copenhagen in 1910 Die Gleichheit was once again recognized as the official organ of the international women's socialist movement.

From 1919 to 1922 the paper was edited by Clara Bohm-Schuch. The paper ceased publication in 1923.

== Sources ==
- Kollontai, Alexandra (1984). "Selected Articles and Speeches". www.marxists.org. Progress Publishers.
- Mutert, Susanne (1996). "Femmes et syndicats en Bavière". Métiers, corporations, syndicalismes (in French). Presses Univ. du Mirail. ISBN 978-2-85816-289-5.
- Zelfel, Alexandra (2004). Erziehen - die Politik von Frauen: Erziehungsdiskurse im Spiegel von Frauenzeitschriften im ausgehenden 19. Jahrhundert. Julius Klinkhardt. ISBN 978-3-7815-1358-7.
