= Clara Tschudi =

Norwegian writer (1856–1945)

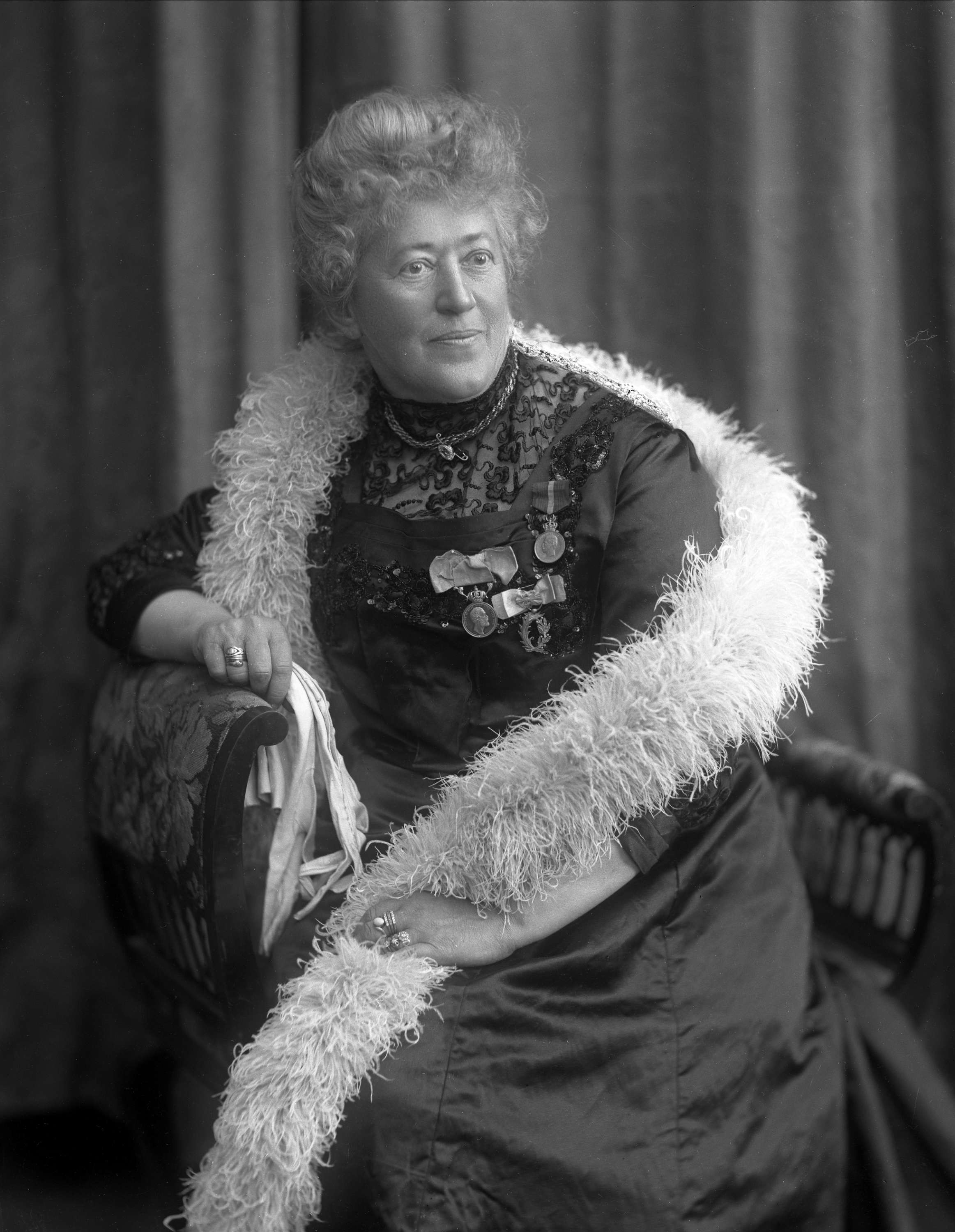
- Tschudi in 1911
- Born: 9 September 1856; Tønsberg, Norway
- Died: 10 November 1945 (aged 89)
- Occupation: Biographer

Clara Tschudi (9 September 1856 – 10 November 1945) was a Norwegian writer.

She was born in Tønsberg. She is best known for her biographies of contemporary and historical women. Among her publications are the book Kvindebevægelsen, dens Udvikling og nuværende Standpunkt from 1885, and Tre Nutidskvinder from 1887 about the women's rights activists Camilla Collett, Lina Morgenstern and Gertrude Guillaume-Schack. Her book Kejserinde Eugenie from 1889 was the first of a series of biographical portraits of central women in the European Royal families. A German translation of her book on Empress Elisabeth of Austria was subsequently forbidden in Austria. She resided in Gausdal, and died in November 1945.

== List of works translated into English ==
- Marie Antoinette (1898) translated by E. M. Cope
- Eugenie, Empress of the French. A Popular Sketch (1899) translated by E. M. Cope
- Napoleon's Mother (1900) translated by E. M. Cope
- Augusta, Empress of Germany (1900) translated by E. M. Cope
- Elizabeth, Empress of Austria and Queen of Hungary (1901) translated by E. M. Cope
- Maria Sophia, Queen of Naples (1905) translated by Ethel Harriet Hearn
- Ludwig the Second, King of Bavaria (1908) translated by Ethel Harriet Hearn
- Napoleon's Son (1912) translated by E. M. Cope
