= Gertrude Guillaume-Schack =

German activist (1845–1903)

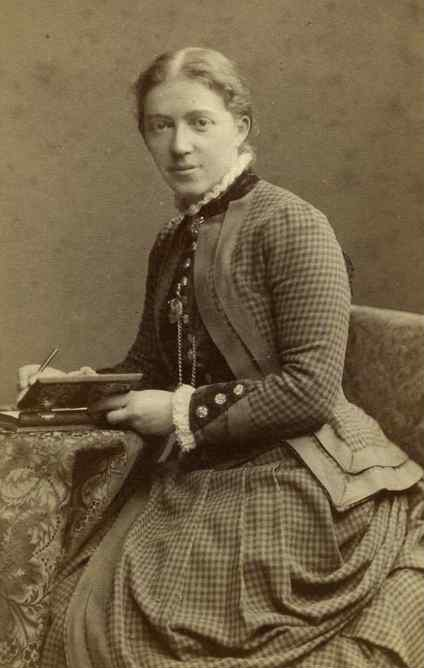
- Gertrude Guillaume-Schack in 1867
- Born: Gertrud Gräfin Schack von Wittenau; 9 November 1845; Uschütz, Province of Silesia, Kingdom of Prussia
- Died: 20 May 1903 (aged 57); Surbiton, United Kingdom
- Occupation: Activist

Gertrude Guillaume-Schack (9 November 1845 – 20 May 1903) was a German women's rights activist who pioneered the fight against state-regulated prostitution in Germany, where she was born. She met considerable resistance due to the prevailing belief that such matters should not be discussed by respectable people, especially women. She also became active in organizing workers associations for German women, and was linked to the Social Democratic Party (SPD). Her activities and political views caused her to be exiled by the German authorities. She moved to England in 1886, where she became involved in socialist organizations, but fell out with Friedrich Engels. After a period of activity in the Socialist League, she became involved in theosophy. Refusal to accept medical treatment may have contributed to her early death of untreated breast cancer.

== Early years ==
Gertrud Schack was born on 9 November 1845 in the village of Uschütz, Silesia, Kingdom of Prussia, near what is now Gorzów Śląski, Poland. Her parents were Count Alexander Schack von Wittenau and Elizabeth, Countess of Königsdorf. Her father's family belonged to the old nobility of Lower Silesia. Her father, Count Schack, was an open-minded and wise man who exercised great influence on his gifted daughter. In 1862, when Gertrud was seventeen years old, her parents left their estate and bought a villa in Beuthen an der Oder. Her father sent Gertrud to live with a sister, asking her to visit him often. In the autumn of 1873 she moved to Neufchatel, Switzerland. In 1876 she married a Swiss painter, and lived for a while with him in his parents' house. Her husband was Edouard Guillaume of Les Verrières, Neuchatel. Her brother-in-law was James Guillaume, an anarchist closely associated with Mikhail Bakunin. (Note: Some sources incorrectly say that the anarchist James Guillaume was her husband. He was her husband's brother.) The newlyweds moved to Paris, but it turned out that her husband was not willing to commit to marriage and abandon his bachelor habits, and Gertrude was constrained to demand a divorce. In the summer of 1878 she returned home from Paris.

== Abolitionist ==
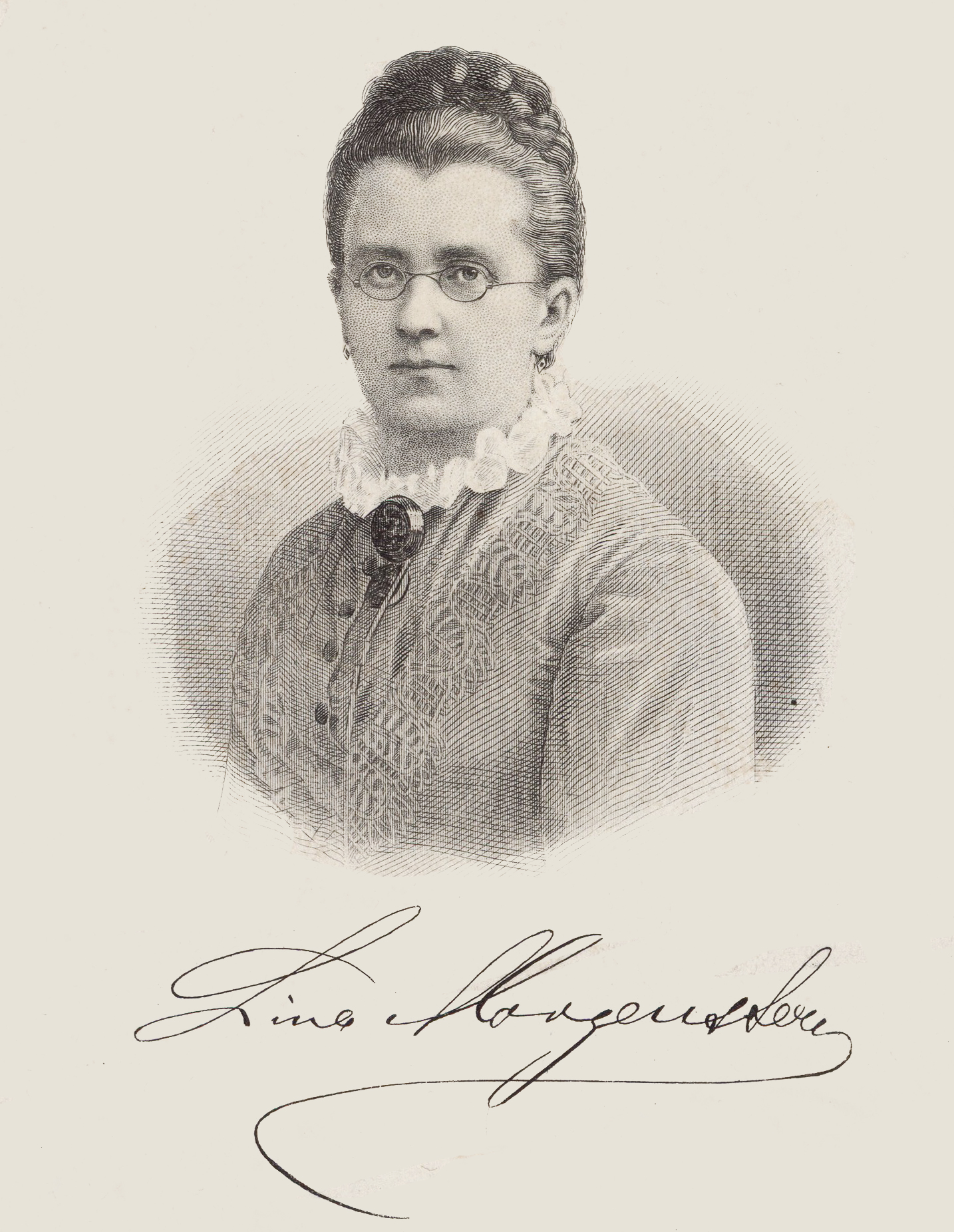
Lina Morgenstern, who helped Guillaume-Schack run a women's hostel in Berlin

While in Paris Guillaume-Schack became active in the abolitionist movement started by Josephine Butler of England to fight state-regulated prostitution. (Note: The reformers led by Josephine Butler used the term "Abolition" as a reference to the earlier movement to abolish slavery, since they considered that state-regulated prostitution was a form of slavery of women. Abolitionists were against the abuses inherent in state regulations and against restrictions on the basic freedoms of women in prostitution such as their right to freedom of movement and to voluntary medical examination. Butler asserted that regulation deprived women of the rights bestowed by Magna Carta and the writ of habeas corpus. The proceedings of the 1877 IAF congress in Geneva show that many members of the movement were also in favor of prohibiting prostitution. By the time the second congress was held in Genoa in 1880 the emphasis had shifted to guaranteeing the human rights of the prostitute by eliminating unjust regulations and police practices. Prohibition had been dropped from the official goals.) She began the campaign in Germany with the same goals. In her view, compulsory medical examinations and other regulations imposed on prostitutes penalized the women, but ignored their male clients. In January 1879 she went to Berlin to work for the cause, and in May 1879 gave her first lectures to very small audiences. She spoke publicly against state-regulated prostitution in the city hall of Berlin on 14 May 1880, but very few people turned up to hear her. On 7 March 1880 she founded the Deutscher Kulturbund (German Cultural Association) in Berlin. The Deutscher Kulturbund was, in effect, the first chapter of what would become the International Abolitionist Federation (IAF) in Germany. Technically, it was independent of the IAF, due to restrictions imposed by the laws of Prussia, and was based in Beuthen an der Oder, however, it followed the principles that Butler had defined.

Although she was supported by the leaders of the Berlin's women's movement, Lina Morgenstern and Franziska Tiburtius, progress was slow. Many respectable people thought that it was not proper for them to discuss prostitution publicly. Guillaume-Schack expressed this view when she opened a public talk in 1882 by saying, "perhaps it will have surprised you, that a matter so difficult to handle as the morality question should be discussed in public, and perhaps yet more that I, a woman, want to speak about it." (Note: Disapproval of public discussion of vice persisted. In 1895 the board of the BDF tried to prevent public discussion of a petition on prostitution it had presented to the national parliament because it addresses "very awkward matters". In 1896, when Hanna Bieber-Böhm started to speak at an international women's conference in Berlin on "The Morality Question – A Public Health Issue", some women among the attendees promptly rose and left the room. In 1904 Katharina Scheven said it "is still regarded in many educated circles as unbecoming to know about these things, much less to talk about them.) (Note: Liberal Protestant activists in Germany were in close contact with the IAF, and Ludwig Weber (1846–1922) was on the IAF executive commission until 1887. However, the conservative Protestants had difficulty with the dominant liberal view that an individual had the right to do whatever they wanted with their body as long as they did not harm or affect the rights of others. The liberals thought the state should defend the rights of citizens but should not impose any particular religious or moral values, while the conservatives thought "the state is the guardian of God's commandments." Conservatives were also unable to accept the outspoken role that women played in the IAF, feeling it was for men to take the initiative.) The Prussian Law of Association, which remained in force until 1908, also restricted the right of women to meet and talk about social and political issues in public.

Guillaume-Schack spoke at many events and meetings. The Bulletin Continental, the organ of the British, Continental and General Federation (the future IAF), reported that in January and February 1882 she had spoken in Breslau, Liegnitz, Berlin, Hanover, Bonn, Cologne, and Düsseldorf. In March she attended meetings in Elberfeld, Barmen, Wiesbaden, and then Darmstadt, where a large mixed meeting including women and girls was organized in the gymnasium. The audience had been told of the subject in advance, and listened quietly other than a few male hecklers at the front. She told them that the morality police were a source of difficulty for a young fallen woman who wanted to return to an honest life. At this, the police commissioner and his agents went up to her and demanded that she stop her speech, since it was immoral.

The following day Guillaume-Schack and another participant were charged for having disturbed the peace and caused grave disorders. Her trial was due to her effrontery in simply speaking openly about prostitution. At the trial it was confirmed that Guillaume-Schack had been dignified and serious. The trial turned into an inquiry into the vice squad, while the two defendants were acquitted. It emerged that children of thirteen or fourteen years of age could be registered as prostitutes and allowed to practice this trade as long as they followed police regulations, the only trade a minor could follow without the permission of their parents. In 1882 Guillaume-Schack published the polemical Über unsere sittlichen Verhältnisse ("About our moral relations") concerning prostitution and white slavery. The movement gradually came to life. The Berlin branch of the Cultural Association was allowed to hold meetings in a room at the Ministry of Religion and Justice, where they distributed a number of leaflets and brochures. Some of the worst excesses of the system were curtailed. Despite interference from the police the organization grew to twelve branches. Many of its members were feminists. They tried to help girls and women, and also to end regulated prostitution in Germany, a system that let these women "fall".

Guillaume-Schack met the Silesian activist Lina Morgenstern, and they founded the Verein zur Rettung und Erziehung minorenner strafentlassener Mädchen ("Association for the Rescue and Education of Girls Dismissed of Criminal Charges"), which ran a hostel for young women seeking work. It was located opposite the newly opened main Berlin railway station. In August 1885 Guillaume-Shack visited Berne and gave two public talks to audiences of women, leading to formation the next year of the Association of Berne Women to Improve Morality. The authorities banned Guillaume-Schack due to her public meetings on abolitionist issues, and her association with the banned Social Democratic Party (SPD).

== German socialist ==
In 1884 Guillaume-Schack founded the Central-Kranken- und Begräbniskasse für Frauen und Mädchen in Deutschland (Central Ambulance and Funeral Fund for Women and Girls in Germany). This was a front organization for unauthorized workers associations as well as a regional platform. It sparked activity among working women, and soon grew to 20,000 members. In 1885 Guillaume-Schack and Emma Ihrer founded the Verein zur Vertretung der Interessen der Arbeiterinnen (the Association to Promote the Interests of Working Women) in Berlin in collaboration with the SDP. Guillaume-Schack was elected honorary President of the Berlin workers association. It was banned after a year as a political organization.

Guillaume-Schack joined the SPD in 1885. She was strongly opposed to special regulations for women's work and organized protests against proposed protective legislation for women when it was debated in the Reichstag in 1885. Guillaume-Schack undertook a lecture tour of Germany during which, despite massive police intervention, she managed to found workers associations in many other cities on the Berlin model. Encouraged by Guillaume-Schack, other women ventured to speak out and make organizational tours. Guillaume-Schack spoke at meetings of German women workers associations, where she attacked militarism and advanced socialist ideas. Guillaume also attended many meetings in Switzerland where she spoke of the misery of working women. She supported creation of the first associations of working women and housewives.

In January 1886 Guillaume-Schack launched Die Staatsbürgerin (The Citizeness), a newspaper, in Offenbach am Main. The paper reported the meetings of working women's associations, gave statistics on working conditions and wages, and gave news and commentary on the wage struggles. Die Staatsbürgerin, the first German journal for working women, was prohibited and pulped after just six months of publication. By marrying a Swiss Guillaume-Schack was considered to have given up her German citizenship. She was barred from living in several cities in Germany, and then deported, allowed to return only for short family visits.

== England ==
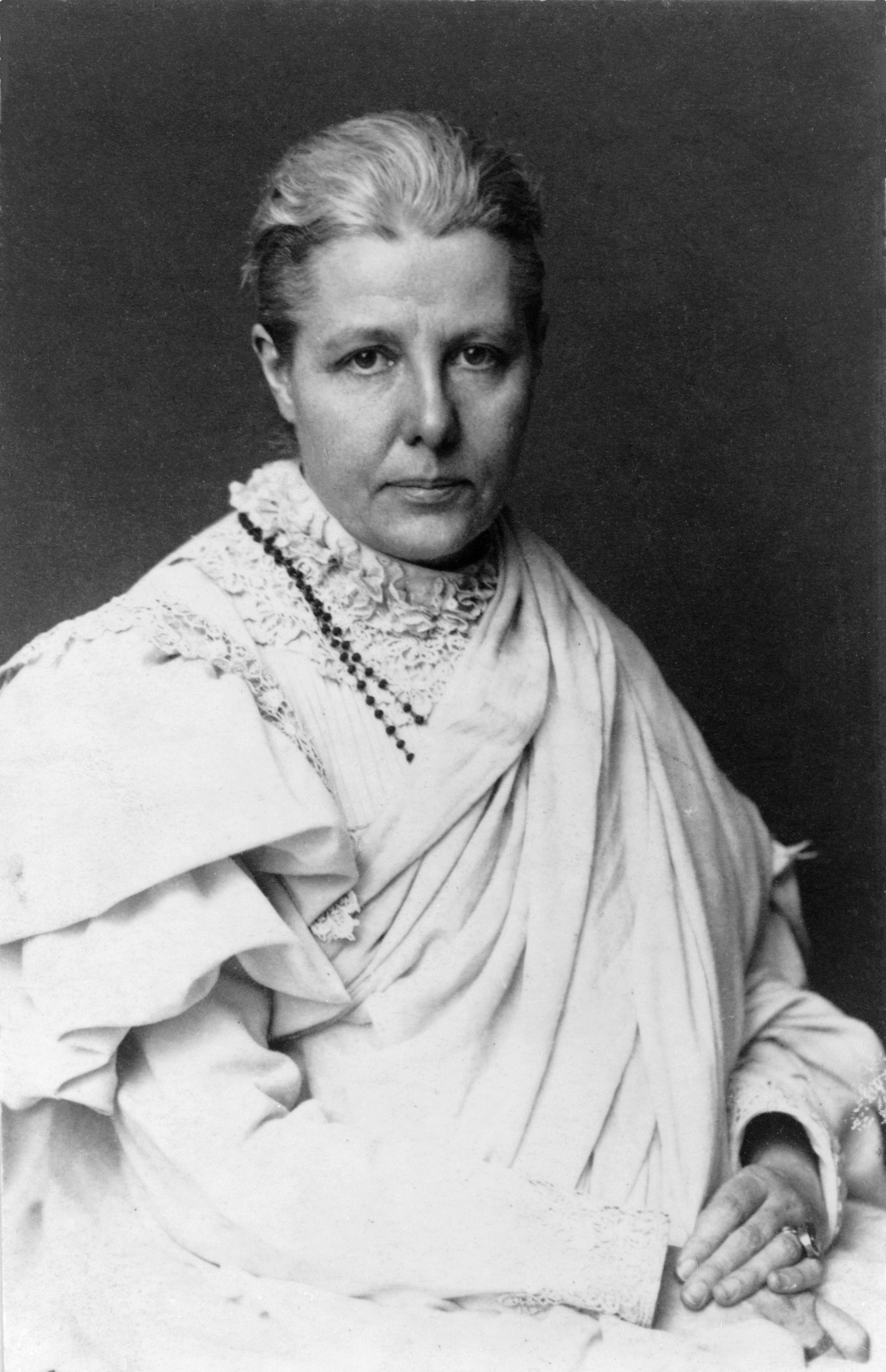
Annie Besant, socialist and theosophist

Guillaume-Schack arrived in England in 1886. She met Friedrich Engels, who found her pleasant, intelligent and amusing company, but was suspicious about the links she had made outside the socialist movement. He wrote of her earlier abolitionist activities, "in pursuing it she is in league with the religious bourgeois ladies of the Anti-Contagious-Disease Acts Agitation (Note: The Contagious Diseases Acts had extended British regulations of women in prostitution in military areas to cover the whole country. In the 1870s Josephine Butler, later founder of the International Abolitionist Federation helped organize the Ladies National Association for the Repeal of the Contagious Diseases Acts. Butler and the pastors and friends who joined her were at first campaigning for the "freedom and purity of our English Commonwealth". This meant the liberty of women and also morality and the family.) and with sundry anarchist elements in the Socialist League. (Note: The Socialist League was formed in 1884 by William Morris and others who left the Social Democratic Federation due to disillusionment with its doctrinaire leadership. The Socialist League was gradually taken over by anarchists.)" He also looked down on women, writing that as soon as they began to disagree with each other they would tell tales about party activities, and might go as far as denouncing their comrades to the police. In July 1885 Engels wrote to Guillaume-Schack "it is my conviction that real equality of women and men can come true only when the exploitation of either by capital has been abolished and private housework has been transformed into a public industry.

Engels was often highly critical of middle-aged female intellectuals such as the theosophist, Annie Besant, the journalist, Emily Crawford, and Gertrude Guillaume-Schack. Engels greeted the campaign for women's suffrage with scorn, writing of, "these presumptuous little women who make so much noise for the rights of women", saying their cause was a diversion behind which class rule would continue to thrive. Guillaume-Schack broke with Engels in 1887. A dispute over Edward Aveling was said to be the cause.

In 1887 Guillaume-Schack spoke in opposition to the official SDP position on protective legislation for women. She became sympathetic to the anarchists of the Socialist League. She was active in the Socialist League from 1887 to 1890 and participated in the International Socialist Workers Congress of Paris on 14 July 1889 as a representative of the International Working Men's Club.

In 1895 Guillaume-Schack attended the committee meeting of the Women's Franchise League in Aberystwyth together with Ursula Mellor Bright, Mrs Behrens, Esther Bright, Herbert Burrows, Dr Clark MP, Mrs Hunter of Matlock Bank, Jane Brownlow, Mrs E. James (who lived locally), H.N.Mozley, Alice Cliff Scatcherd, Jane Cobden Unwin and Dr and Mrs Pankhurst.

Guillaume-Schack became interested in theosophy around the end of the nineteenth century. She died on 20 May 1903 in Surbiton, aged 57. Gertrude Guillaume Schack was described in a coroner's inquest as a Theosophist, socialist lecturer, temperance advocate, and a strict vegetarian. About twelve months earlier she had fallen over a tin box in her bedroom and injured her breast. She had consulted a former doctor whose name had been removed from the register, but in whom she had great faith. He had urged her to see a specialist, but she had refused, saying as a theosophist she saw death as just a transition from one state to another, and would not have any interference with her body. A doctor was called in a few hours before her death, but her condition was too far advanced for him to be able to offer any treatment. The cause of death was recorded as cancer of the breast, accelerated by want of proper surgical dressing and food.

== Legacy ==
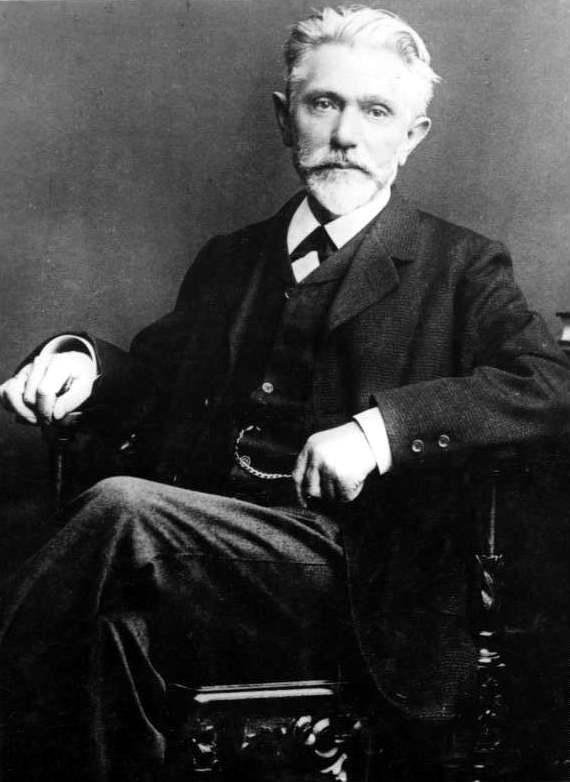
August Bebel influenced Guillaume-Schack, and he in turn learned from her

In her day Gertrud Guillaume-Schack was one of the most compelling voices in Germany. Max Kretzer (1854–1941) dedicated his 1882 novel Die Betrogenen (The Deceived) to Gertrude Guillaume, born Countess Schack. It told of a working girl who was seduced and later became a prostitute. Guillaume-Schack was a strong believer in the views of August Bebel. The famous work by Bebel entitled Die Frau und der Sozialismus (1879), with its description of the British campaign against the Contagious Diseases Acts and Guillaume Schack's campaign in Germany, reflected her influence.

Guillaume-Schack and Lily Braun were the only two aristocratic women to join the SDP. Braun wrote a history of the women worker's movement of Germany in which she gave Guillaume-Schack credit for developing the movement. This was unfair to women such as Clara Zetkin, who continued to work in Germany after Guillaume-Schack had left for England. After Guillaume-Schack's exile the cause of protecting women and girls in Germany was first taken up by more conservative men and women. The abolitionist movement that she had established became known as the Sittlichkeit ("purity") movement, and was led by antisemites such as Pastor Ludwig Weber, and Dr. Adolf Stoecker. Members could not be socialist and were required to be Christian. Within a decade, though, young and liberal women who had heard her speak in London took up the abolitionist cause in Germany, including Anna Pappritz, Anita Augspurg, Katharina Scheven, and Minna Cauer.

== Sources ==
- Adams, Carole Elizabeth (18 July 2002). Women Clerks in Wilhelmine Germany: Issues of Class and Gender. Cambridge University Press. ISBN 978-0-521-52684-5.
- Adler, Victor; Engels, Friedrich (14 December 2011). Victor Adler / Friedrich Engels, Briefwechsel. Walter de Gruyter. ISBN 978-3-05-004988-5.
- Atkinson, Dorothy; Dallin, Alexander; Lapidus, Gail Warshofsky (1 January 1977). Women in Russia. Stanford University Press. ISBN 978-0-8047-0910-1.
- Berkovitch, Nitza (29 April 1999). From Motherhood to Citizenship: Women's Rights and International Organizations. JHU Press. ISBN 978-0-8018-6028-7.
- Braukmann, Stephanie (2007). Die "jüdische Frage" in der sozialistischen Frauenbewegung 1890–1914. Campus Verlag. ISBN 978-3-593-38184-8.
- "Chronique Allemande". Bibliothèque universelle et revue suisse (in French). Bureau de la Bibliothèque universelle. 1882.
- Corbin, Alain (1 September 1996). Women for Hire: Prostitution and Sexuality in France After 1850. Harvard University Press. ISBN 978-0-674-95544-8.
- Custers, Peter (1 May 2012). Capital Accumulation and Women's Labor in Asian Economies. NYU Press. ISBN 978-1-58367-287-7.
- Dickinson, Edward Ross (17 February 2014). Sex, Freedom, and Power in Imperial Germany, 1880–1914. Cambridge University Press. ISBN 978-1-107-04071-7.
- Docherty, James C.; Lamb, Peter (2 October 2006). "Morris, William (1834–96)". Historical Dictionary of Socialism. Scarecrow Press. ISBN 978-0-8108-6477-1.
- Eigler, Friederike Ursula; Kord, Susanne (1 January 1997). The Feminist Encyclopedia of German Literature. Greenwood Publishing Group. ISBN 978-0-313-29313-9.
- Gaillard, Ursula; Mahaim, Annik (1983). Retards de règles: attitudes devant le contrôle des naissances et l'avortement en Suisse du début du siècle aux années vingt (in French). Editions d'en bas. ISBN 978-2-8290-0025-6.
- Gélieu, Claudia von (2008). Vom Politikverbot ins Kanzleramt: ein hürdenreicher Weg für Frauen. Lehmanns Media. ISBN 978-3-86541-265-2.
- Gerhard, Ute (2001). Debating Women's Equality: Toward a Feminist Theory of Law from a European Perspective. Rutgers University Press. ISBN 978-0-8135-2905-9.
- "Gertrud Guillaume-Schack Papers" (PDF). International Institute of Social History.
- Gigandet, Cyrille (12 December 2013). "Guillaume, James". Historischen Lexikon der Schweiz (in German).
- Goodwin, Barbara (6 December 2012). The Philosophy of Utopia. Routledge. ISBN 978-1-136-33763-5.
- Harris, Victoria (25 March 2010). Selling Sex in the Reich: Prostitutes in German Society, 1914–1945. Oxford University Press. ISBN 978-0-19-161468-2.
- Hofmann, Marie (1904). Helene Lange, Gertrud Bäumer (ed.). "Die Anfänge der Sittlichkeitsbewegung in Deutschland". Die Frau, Monatsschrift für das gesamte Frauenleben unserer Zeit (in German). Berlin.
- Hunt, Tristram (2010). La vita rivoluzionaria di Friedrich Engels (in Italian). Isbn Edizioni. ISBN 978-88-7638-189-8.
- Jenzer, Sabine (2014). Die "Dirne", der Bürger und der Staat: Private Erziehungsheime für junge Frauen und die Anfänge des Sozialstaates in der Deutschschweiz, 1870er bis 1940er Jahre (in German). Böhlau Verlag Köln Weimar. ISBN 978-3-412-22238-3.
- Kinna, Ruth (28 June 2012). The Bloomsbury Companion to Anarchism. Bloomsbury Publishing. ISBN 978-1-4411-4270-2.
- Kulturwerk Schlesien (1990). Schlesien (in German). Kulturwerk Schlesien.
- "Le procès de Mme Guillaume-Schack". Le Bulletin continental (in French). La Fédération. 1882.
- Limoncelli, Stephanie (23 February 2010). The Politics of Trafficking: The First International Movement to Combat the Sexual Exploitation of Women. Stanford University Press. ISBN 978-0-8047-6294-6.
- Limoncelli, Stephanie (2013). "Women's International Activism on Trafficking and Prostitution". Women and Social Movements, International— 1840 to Present. Thomas Dublin, Kathryn Kish Sklar and Alexander Street Press. Archived from the original on 6 December 2014.
- Lischke, Ute (1 January 2000). Lily Braun, 1865–1916: German Writer, Feminist, Socialist. Camden House. ISBN 978-1-57113-169-0.
- Marx, Karl; Engels, Friedrich; Lapides, Kenneth (1 June 1990). Marx and Engels on Trade Unions. International Publishers Co. ISBN 978-0-7178-0676-8.
- Mutert, Susanne (1996). "Femmes et syndicats en Bavière". Métiers, corporations, syndicalismes (in French). Presses Univ. du Mirail. ISBN 978-2-85816-289-5.
- Oliver, Hermia (1983). The International Anarchist Movement in Late Victorian London. Palgrave Macmillan. p. 176. ISBN 978-0-312-41958-5.
- "Practice by a Disregistered Person". The British Medical Journal. 2 (2218). 4 July 1903. JSTOR 20277028.
- Probst, Ernst (12 August 2006). "Gertrud Guillaume Schack". Kurzbiografien berühmter Feministinnen. Archived from the original on 2 November 2014.
- Schmackpfeffer, Petra (1999). Frauenbewegung und Prostitution : über das Verhältnis der alten und neuen deutschen Frauenbewegung zur Prostitution (PDF). BIS Verlag. ISBN 3-8142-0329-1.
- Schönfeld, Christiane (February 1997). "The Urbanization of the Body: Prostitutes, Dialectics, and Utopia in German Expressionism". German Studies Review. 20 (1). The Johns Hopkins University Press on behalf of the German Studies Association: 49–62. doi:10.2307/1432329. JSTOR 1432329.
- Sklar, Kathryn Kish; Schüler, Anja; Strasser, Susan (1998). Social Justice Feminists in the United States and Germany: A Dialogue in Documents, 1885–1933. Cornell University Press. ISBN 0-8014-8469-3.
- Smith, Jill Suzanne (28 February 2014). Berlin Coquette: Prostitution and the New German Woman, 1890–1933. Cornell University Press. ISBN 978-0-8014-6970-1.
- Studer, Brigitte (6 March 2007). "Guillaume [-Schack], Gertrud". Historisches Lexikon der Schweiz (in German).
- Summers, Anne (Autumn 2006). "Which Women? What Europe? Josephine Butler and the International Abolitionist Federation". History Workshop Journal. 62 (62). Oxford University Press: 214–231. doi:10.1093/hwj/dbl005. JSTOR 25472881.
- Tschudi, Clara (1887). Tre nutidskvinder: Camilla Collett, Lina Morgenstern, Gertrud Guillaume-Schack (in Danish). Schous.
- Wikander, Ulla; Kessler-Harris, Alice; Lewis, Jane E. (1 January 1995). Protecting Women: Labor Legislation in Europe, the United States, and Australia, 1880–1920. University of Illinois Press. ISBN 978-0-252-06464-7.
