= Robert Danneberg =

Austrian politician (1882–1942)

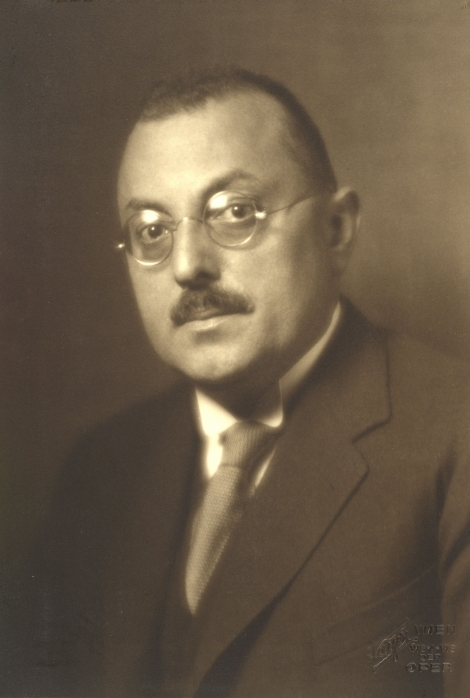
- Portrait of Danneberg by Georg Fayer

Personal details
- Born: 23 July 1882
- Died: c. December 12, 1942 (aged 60) Auschwitz concentration camp
- Party: Social Democratic Party of Austria
- Spouse: Gertrud Schröbler (m. 1918)
- Children: 2

Robert Danneberg (23 July 1882 – c. 12 December 1942) was an Austrian politician, a member of the Social Democratic Workers Party of Austria (SDAPÖ) and a prominent Austro-Marxist theoretician. Danneberg was one of the architects of Red Vienna and he was killed in the Auschwitz concentration camp in 1942.

== Life ==
Danneburg was born in Vienna on 23 July 1885 into an intellectual Jewish family. He joined SDAPÖ and the Workers Youth Association in 1903. Danneberg was active in the international youth movement, and became the Secretary of the International Federation of Socialist Young People's Organizations in 1908, however when the war broke out he withdrew from his position because he thought working for the Youth International was pointless during war time so the chairmanship was given to Willi Münzenberg. In the same year, he became responsible for the educational and cultural programmes of the party and took on the editorship of the SDAPÖ educational journal Die Bildungsarbeit. In 1909, Danneberg obtained a doctorate in Law.

During the First World War, Danneberg belonged to the 'Anti-War left' inside SDAPÖ. Nevertheless, he opposed division of the party and the launching of the Communist Party of Austria. Danneberg married Gertrud Schröbler in 1918. They had two children together.

Danneberg was a parliamentarian between 1919 and 1934. Moreover, he became the president of the Vienna Provincial Assembly. Danneberg was also influential in the municipal government of Vienna. As the author of the housing policy of the Vienna SDAPÖ and a co-author of its municipal and taxation policies, he played a pivotal role in shaping 'Red Vienna'. He represented the SDAPÖ in the Executive of the Labour and Socialist International between October 1931 and December 1935.

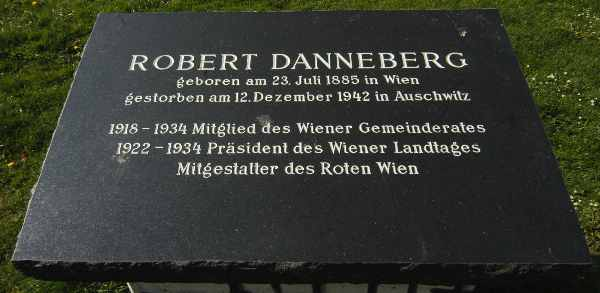
Danneberg's tombstone

Danneberg was arrested and jailed after the Austrian Civil War in 1934. He was, however, released the following year. After the Anschluss, Danneberg tried to flee to Prague by train, but was arrested again. He was interned in three different concentration camps; Dachau, Buchenwald and Auschwitz. He was killed in Auschwitz c. 12 December 1942. An empty urn at Feuerhalle Simmering serves as his cenotaph in Vienna.
