= International Federation of Socialist Young People's Organizations =

The International Federation of Socialist Young People's Organizations was a federation of youth organizations affiliated with the Socialist parties of the Second International.

== Background ==
Socialist youth groups had been appearing in Europe since the mid-1880s but there was only discussion of youth organizing on the international scale at the Socialist congress of 1900, in Paris. A resolution was passed on appealing to member parties to organize youth groups, and a meeting of youth representatives was supposedly held. Another meeting at the 1904 world congress in Amsterdam did take place, but without lasting consequences.

International cooperation on a more permanent basis began during the lead up to the Stuttgart International Socialist Congress of 1907. At the Mannheim conference of the German Social Democratic Youth in September 1906, Karl Leibknecht made a speech about the struggle against militarism, particularly with regard to youth organizations. It was decided there that an "internationale" of socialist youth should be attempted. Hendrik de Man, a member of the Belgian Workers Party youth group who was studying in Germany, was put in charge of the preparatory work. By December of that year he had begun publishing a Bulletin for the new group in French and a German version beginning in January 1907. By March 1907 a provisional bureau had been established with de Man as secretary and Liebknect and Ludwig Frank as assessors, with a headquarters in Leipzig. The project was endorsed by the International Socialist Bureau, which granted the youth bureau a subsidy.

By August 1907 the provisional bureau had already collected a number of written reports from a number of socialist youth organizations and published this in a small pamphlet making detailed reports on the situation in various countries unnecessary at the conference which assembled that month.

== Stuttgart 1907 ==
The first international socialist youth conference was held at Stuttgart August 24–26, 1907, in conjunction with that year's general international socialist congress. There were 20 delegates from 13 countries:

- Belgium: Léon Troclet and Arthur Jauniaux
- German Austria: Leopold Winarsky
- Hungary: Gyula Alpári
- Italy: Angelica Balabanoff
- Bohemia: Emanuele Skatula and Lustig (Note: The source gives the surname but not the given name. It may not be possible to identify who this was.)
- Switzerland: Bader and Kleinert
- Netherlands: Henriette Roland Holst
- Spain: Fabra Rivas
- Great Britain: Simpson
- Sweden and Denmark: Gustav Möller
- Australia: Victor Kroemer
- Germany: Hermann Remmele, Tente, Eichhorn and Lupnitz

The International Bureau itself was represented by de Man and Liebknecht. Yanko Sakazov of Bulgaria and a Mrs. L. Bruce Glasier (Katharine Glasier?) of Great Britain also attended as observers.

It was decided at this conference to move the seat of the International Federation to Vienna, and to replace the provisional bureau with a permanent one: Henriette Roland Holst, Leopold Winarsky, Gustav Möller and Karl Liebknecht (Emanuele Skatula was his substitute while he was incarcerated). Robert Danneberg was chosen to succeed de Man beginning January 1, 1908.

== Copenhagen 1910 ==
The Second International Conference of Socialist Youth was held September 4, 1910, in conjunction was the International Socialist Congress meeting that year. In attendance were:

- Belgium: Henri de Man and Arthur Jauniaux
- German Austria: Robert Danneberg
- Netherlands: David Wijnkoop
- Switzerland: Bock
- Bohemia: Emanuele Skatula (Regional Agitations Committee of Bohemia, Moravia, Silesia and Lower Austria) and Skala (Kladno District)
- Finland: Haskila
- Norway: Krogh
- Sweden: Höglund, Strom, Möller, Junberg and Stold
- Great Britain: Gossip and Bruce Glasier
- Bulgaria: Zańków and Rabatchiew
- Denmark: E. Larson, Halvoren, Hansea, Andresen, Knudsen, Jorgensen, Fledilius, Bergstrom, Jensen, Madsen, H. Jensen, K. Jensen, Th. Dansen, Christiansen and Nordstrom

Attending as guests:

- Germany: Friedrich Ebert, Carl Legien, Louise Zeitz, Emma Ihrer, Peters, Klara Rode, Korn for the central office of the SPD; Rudolf of Frankfurt; Adler of Kiel; Rosenfeld of Berlin; Hanisch of Dortmund
- France: Dormon
- Hungary: Weltner
- Serbia: Tuchowicz
- Romania: Zimand and Rakovsky

== Basel 1912 ==
An extraordinary conference of Socialist Youth was held in Basel in 1912. The participants in it were as follows:

- Austria: Robert Danneberg (German, Italian and Polish movement); Marie Majerva and Reiter (Czechoslovaks)
- Belgium: Hendrik de Man
- Bosnia: Jakšić
- Bulgaria: Kabackieff
- Denmark: Hoglund
- Finland: Manner
- France: Levy, Strago
- Netherlands: David Wijnkoop
- Italy: Vella
- Norway: Hoglund
- Sweden: Hoglund, Ture Nerman
- Switzerland: Bock, Münzenberg and Meyer
- Spain: Fabra Rivas, Corrales
- Hungary: Tesáre
- Romania: Grigorovich, Dobragean-Gerhea

Skatula and Krogh were also present as members of the international bureau.

== Berne 1915 ==
After the cancellation of the planned Socialist Youth Conference along with the rest of the International Socialist Congress at Vienna after the outbreak of the First World War the Swiss Socialist youth league began an active correspondence with the Italian and Scandinavian youth organizations with the goal of organizing a conference independently. They contacted Danneberg and the Vienna Bureau, but they were uninterested so the conference went ahead without the official backing of the Federation that had been established at Stuttgart in 1907.

On April 5–7, 1915 (Easter) a conference of the young socialists was held at the Volkshaus in Berne, Switzerland. This was done n spite of official disapproval of the pro-war parties, much like the Socialist Women's conference held earlier that year in the same city. The following 16 delegates from 10 countries participated:

- Germany: Notz, Dietrich and Strum
- Poland: Dombrowski
- Sweden and Norway: Ansgar Olaussen
- Italy: Angelica Balabanoff
- Denmark: Chr. Christensen
- Russia:Weiss (Menshevik), Inessa Armand and Jegorow (Bolsheviks)
- Netherlands: Lutaraan
- Bulgaria: S. Minev
- Switzerland: Willi Münzenberg and Trostel

Messages were received from groups of French, Greek, Dutch, German and Austrian youth who were unable to attend and even from the Vienna Bureau. Robert Grimm, Fritz Platten and Hans Vogel also attended on behalf of the Swiss Party and labor movement.

After hearing reports on the status of the socialist youth movements in participating counties, discussion turned to the mode of voting. It was decided by a majority that each country would have one vote, after which the Russian delegates withdrew in protest. After they left Grimm and Balabanoff introduced their draft resolution, which was adopted unanimously by all present. The next day the Russian delegation returned with each country given two votes and Poland counted as a country. The Russian and Polish delegates then offered their own resolution which was harsher and the revisionist socialists, state it was necessary to oppose not just this war, but any war of an imperialist character and explicitly stated the means of doing such. This resolution was rejected by a vote of 13 to 3, as were the Russians proposed amendments to the previous resolution.

A resolution introduced by the Scandinavian and Swiss delegates also caused dissension. The resolution invited all its affiliate members to bring pressure on their labor movements to achieve complete disarmament. This resolution was passed by a vote of 9 to 5 with all three Russian delegates voting against.

The Berne conference also took significant organizational steps. The conference created a new provision seat for the federation, at Zurich, with Munzenberg as secretary and Olaussen, Christiansen, Notz and Cantessi as a new bureau. They charged this new organization with publishing a regular periodical, keep in touch with the member socialist groups, direct co-ordinated propaganda and administer the "Leibknekt Fund" for victims of the war. On the initiative of the Lutaaren, it was decided to organize a "Jugendtag", a one protest against the war and militarism across national boundaries by the affiliated socialist youth leagues and co-ordinated the federation. The conference ended with a declaration of sympathy with Rosa Luxemburg and the other victims of wartime persecution.

=== Resolution ===
The resolution adopted by the conference confirmed its commitment to the previous resolutions made at Stuttgart, Copenhagen and Basel, and regretted that socialist youth leagues, like their parent organizations had not been guided by those decisions. The war was the result of the imperialist policy of all capitalist countries, even in those countries which claimed they were fighting a defensive war, and was incompatible with the interests of the laboring class. "Civil peace" was an abandonment of the class struggle and the interest of the proletariat. The Socialist gathered at Berne called on the young working masses to renew the proletarian class struggle in order to conclude peace. The resolution went on to condemn the use of socialist youth leagues "in the service of bourgeois militarist guards" and called on the youth leagues to concentrate on socialist education (which would show that war was an inevitable feature of capitalism) and the renewal of the struggle against capitalism and militarism.

== See also ==
- International Socialist Women's Conferences
