= International Socialist Women's Conferences =

Labour conferences, 1907–1915

During the period of the Second International several International Socialist Women's Conferences were held by the representatives of the women organizations of the affiliated Socialist parties. The first two were held in conjunction with the main International Congresses of the Second International, while the third was held in Bern in 1915. The Conferences were notable for popularizing International Women's Day and were forerunners of groups like the Socialist International Women and the Women's International Democratic Federation.

== Stuttgart 1907 ==
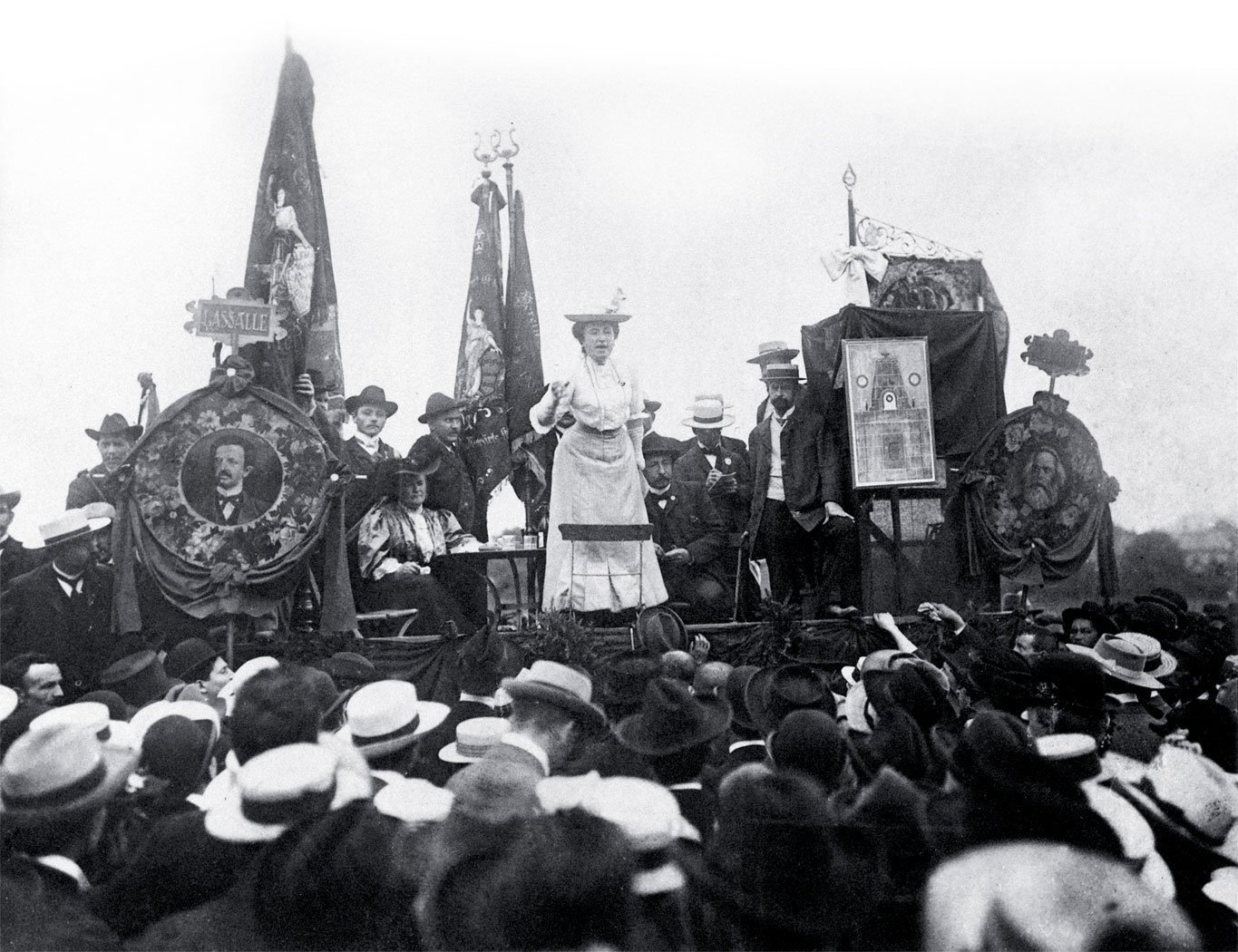
Rosa Luxemburg at the First International Socialist Women's Conference

The impetus for the first International Conference of Socialist Women came from a congress of German women in 1906, which suggested that a conference of Socialist women should be held in conjunction with the following year's International Socialist Congress at Stuttgart. On August 17, 1907, 58 delegates from 15 countries met at the Liederhalle in Stuttgart.

Representatives were present from the Social Democratic Women of Germany, the Executive Committee of the Women of the Empire of Austria, the National Federation of Women Socialists of Belgium, the Social Democratic Women's Clubs of the Netherlands, the Sewing Women's Union of Amsterdam, the Federation of Swiss Workwomen's Societies, the Socialist Women's Committee of Paris, the Social Democratic Party of Finland, the Federation of Swedish Women Workers, the Women's National Progressive League of United States, and Socialist Woman periodical in the United States. Britain sent representatives from the Independent Labour Party, the National Federation of Women Workers, the Women's Labour League, and the Women's Committee of the Social Democratic Federation.

The conference set up the secretariat of the Women's International Council of Socialist and Labour Organizations at Stuttgart and Klara Zetkin's newspaper Die Gleichheit was adopted as the organ for common publication of the affiliates. Zetkin was appointed Secretary of the permanent organization.

== Copenhagen 1910 ==
The Second International Socialist Women's Conference was held on August 26–27, 1910, in Copenhagen, in conjunction with the 1910 Socialist Copenhagen World Congress. One hundred delegates attended from seventeen countries. Among the groups represented were the Social Democratic women of Germany, the Women's Labour League, Federation of Socialist Women's Clubs from the Netherlands and many others. Though conference addressed a number of issues including social legislation, education, public health and the Czar's attempt to erode the sovereignty of Finland, its most animated discussions were on women's suffrage. A debate evolved between the English delegates who favored working with "bourgeois" feminists in order to secure piecemeal expansion of the franchise and the Germans and the "lefts" who felt it was best to merge the proletarian woman's movement into a larger working-class struggle to gain universal suffrage. The latter view predominated. This conference is also remembered for endorsing the idea of an international day of concerted action to protest for female suffrage, on the model of the annual May Day celebrations. This was eventually institutionalized as International Women's Day.

== Bern 1915 ==
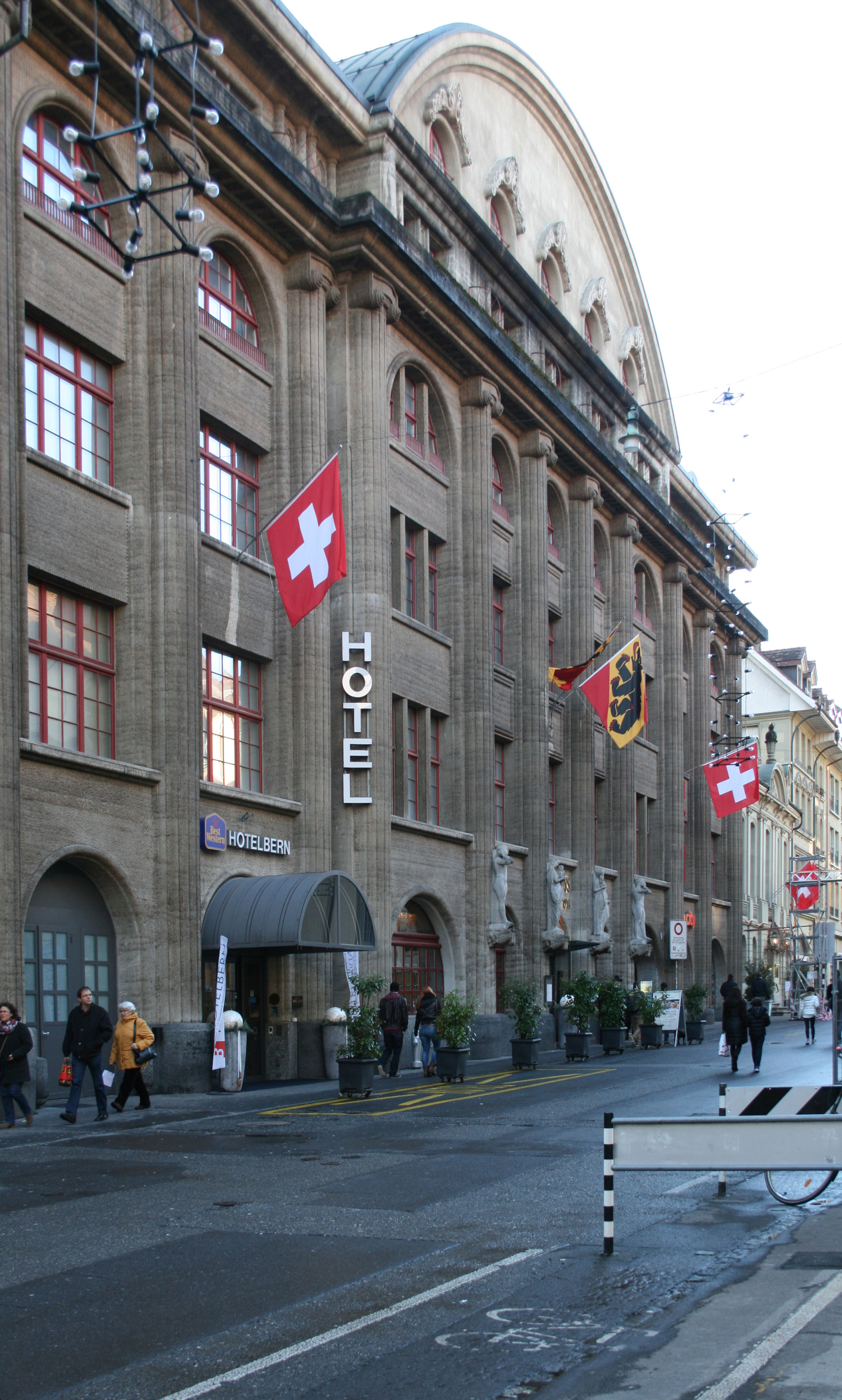
Volkhaus Bern, where the third conference was held

The Third International Socialist Women's Conference was scheduled to be held in Vienna in August 1914, concurrently with the Vienna International Socialist Congress. After the outbreak of the war both events were cancelled. In November 1914 the editors of the Bolshevik women's paper Rabotnitsa contacted the International Secretariat at Stuttgart, suggesting an unofficial conference of left socialist women. Further efforts by the women of the socialist movement led to the convening of the Third International Socialist Women's Conference at Bern March 26–28, 1915.

Wartime conditions limited the number of women able to get to Switzerland. In the end only about thirty delegates were able to attend the conference. Despite the fact that the SPD leadership had forbidden them to go, the German women were represented by a seven-member delegation led by Klara Zetkin, Secretary of the International Bureau of Socialist Women and including Toni Sender. The French Socialist leadership had likewise condemned the conference, but a French delegate, Louise Saumoneau managed to attend nevertheless. There were four delegates from the United Kingdom, representing the Independent Labour Party and the Women's International Council of Socialist and Labour Organizations (British Section) – Marion Phillips, Mary Longman, Margaret Bondfield and Ada Salter. From the neutral countries there came three from the Netherlands, two from Switzerland and one from Italy. Poland was represented by a delegate from Regional Social Democracy of the Kingdom of Poland and Lithuania, while the Main Presidium of the SDKPL and the Polish Socialist Party – Left sent greetings. Russia had two delegations: two from the Mensheviks – Angelica Balabanoff and Irina Izolskaia; and four Bolsheviks - Inessa Armand, Nadezhda Krupskaya, Elena Rozmirovich and Zlata Lilina. Communications were received from Therese Schlesinger of Austria, Alexandra Kollontai from Norway, and two Belgian delegates who were prevented from attending.

The debates at the Conference revealed some of the rifts that were appearing even among anti-war socialists. While resolutions on the high costs of living and against the persecution of Rosa Luxemburg and the Social Democratic Duma members were passed unanimously, the resolutions on the war and nationalism were more controversial. Lenin had taken a private room at the Volkhaus from which he manipulated the Bolshevik delegates. Karl Radek acted as his aid, conveying his wishes to the conference attendees. The Bolsheviks introduced a draft resolution that the Bolsheviks put forward advocated turning the imperialist war into a civil war, carrying out "revolutionary activity among the masses", a complete break and denunciation of the pro-war socialists and a Third International. This was defeated by a vote of 21 to 6. Klara Zetkin's draft resolution carried by the same number. The debate on combating chauvinism and nationalism was equally acrimonious. The Bolsheviks suggested joint revolutionary action between the workers of all countries, while the English put forward a resolution endorsing the International Women's Congress at the Hague. the latter was carried by a vote of all the delegates except the Bolsheviks and the Pole.

The resolution and manifesto that the conference did issue reiterated the hardships that working women had to endure because of the war, the "lie" that the war was one of national defense, blamed the war on capitalists and the armaments race and suggested that socialist women of the various countries unite for international peace action, but neglected to mention the official socialist parties support of the war, or offer any concrete methods to oppose it.

== Stockholm 1917 ==
An unofficial and informal conference was held in Stockholm September 14–15, 1917, by the female delegates from the Third Zimmerwald Conference. The Conference first reviewed the activity of the Bern conference and noted that the subsequent Zimmerwald manifestos and resolutions "emphasized and underscored the principle lines" first drawn up by the socialist women. The meeting also approved a resolutions of the All-German Women's Committee of the Independent Social Democratic Party of Germany and the demands of unnamed French female socialist and labor leaders on the effects of the war on women and children.

Messages of solidarity were received for Klara Zetkin and the suppression of Gleicheit condemned. The conference also noted that funds were being collected in various countries to start a new Gleicheit, particularly from the Italians. Written reports and letters were received from France, Britain, the United States and Finland, and oral reports were delivered on the situation of Socialist women in Germany, Austria, Bulgaria, Finland, Russia, Romania, Sweden and Switzerland. The conference ended with a renewed pledge for the women of the socialist movement to draw closer on the basis of the Berne and Zimmerwald resolutions.

No written list of attendees was published, but the following female delegates were known to have attended the Third Zimmerwald Conference: Therese Schlesinger, Rosa Bloch, Kathe Dunker, Elisabeth Luzzatto, Angelica Balabanoff

== See also ==
- International Congress of Women
- International Federation of Socialist Young People's Organizations
