= Die Staatsbürgerin =

- Discipline: Socialist
- Language: German
- Edited by: Hartwig Gebhardt, Ulla Wischermann

Publication details
- History: January – June 1886
- Publisher: Gertrud Guillaume-Schack (Germany)
- Frequency: Weekly

Standard abbreviations
- ISO 4: Staatsbürgerin

Die Staatsbürgerin (The Citizeness) was a short-lived journal for German working women's associations published for six months in 1886, the first workers' journal in Germany. It was closed by the censors after printing 24 issues.

== History ==
Die Staatsbürgerin was published by Gertrud Guillaume-Schack. It was the first journal published for German workers. It was edited by Hartwig Gebhardt and Ulla Wischermann. The first issue appeared on 3 January 1886, with a statement of purpose on the front page. (Note: Some sources incorrectly state the journal was founded or published in 1884. One source even says it was published from 1884–86.) The title banner declared that Die Staatsbürgerin was the "Organ for the interests of workers". It was published in Offenbach am Main in Hesse.

The journal was published for just six months before it was banned by the censor in June 1886. The reason given was "incitement to class hatred". Guillaume-Schack left Hesse and avoided further prosecution by emigrating to London. Her political ally Johanna Friederike Wecker was spared this fate. Remaining copies were pulped.

At the start of 1890 Die Staatsbürgerin reappeared under the title Die Arbeiterin (The Worker). Clara Zetkin took over direction and again changed its title to Die Gleichheit (Equality), which became one of the most important of the German workers' papers.

== Contents ==
Die Staatsbürgerin provided a means of communication between associations of working women. It was mainly devoted to reporting the meetings of the associations, and gave statistics on working conditions and wages, as well as news and commentary on the wage struggles. The correspondents were mainly from Munich and Zurich. It provides an excellent source of information on the suppression of women's workers associations at the time. The last number (#24) of Die Staatsbürgerin had a cheerfully ironic article about the ban on workers' meetings in Saxony. It said that if political meetings of women were banned, all clubs of female citizens should be closed.

== Sources ==
- Braukmann, Stephanie (2007). Die "jüdische Frage" in der sozialistischen Frauenbewegung 1890-1914. Campus Verlag. ISBN 978-3-593-38184-8.
- Downing, John Derek Hall (2011). Encyclopedia of Social Movement Media. SAGE Publications. ISBN 978-0-7619-2688-7.
- Gerhard, Ute (2001). Debating Women's Equality: Toward a Feminist Theory of Law from a European Perspective. Rutgers University Press. ISBN 978-0-8135-2905-9.
- Klausmann, Christina (1997-01-01). Politik und Kultur der Frauenbewegung im Kaiserreich: das Beispiel Frankfurt am Main (in German). Campus Verlag. ISBN 978-3-593-35758-4.
- Lopes, Anne; Roth, Gary (2000). Men's Feminism: August Bebel and the German Socialist Movement. Humanity Books. ISBN 978-1-57392-868-7.
- Mutert, Susanne (1996). "Femmes et syndicats en Bavière". Métiers, corporations, syndicalismes (in French). Presses Univ. du Mirail. ISBN 978-2-85816-289-5.
- Schönfeld, Christiane (2000). Commodities of Desire: The Prostitute in Modern German Literature. Camden House. ISBN 978-1-57113-198-0.
- Zelfel, Alexandra (2004). Erziehen - die Politik von Frauen: Erziehungsdiskurse im Spiegel von Frauenzeitschriften im ausgehenden 19. Jahrhundert. Julius Klinkhardt. ISBN 978-3-7815-1358-7.
