= Ludwig Weber (pastor) =

German theologian

Friedrich Wilhelm Karl Ludwig Weber
- Born: 2 April 1846; Schwelm, Germany
- Died: 29 January 1922 (aged 75); Bonn, Germany
- Occupations: Pastor, theologian
- Known for: Social reform

Friedrich Wilhelm Karl Ludwig Weber (2 April 1846 – 29 January 1922) was a German Protestant pastor and social reformer. He was a pastor in Mönchengladbach. He was one of the founders of the Evangelical Social Congress and was chairman of the Association of Protestant workers' associations in Germany.

== Life ==
Ludwig Weber was born in Schwelm in Westphalia on 2 April 1846, son of the magistrate Carl Weber and his wife Emilie. He grew up in Marienwerder, West Prussia. In 1863 Weber began to study theology in Bonn, Berlin and Erlangen, graduating in 1868. In Erlangen he was taught strictly orthodox Lutheranism.

He worked in Iserlohn and Dellwig in the Ruhr, then in 1881 was appointed to the newly created third pastorate in Mönchengladbach, where the congregation was growing rapidly due to the expanding textile industry. Weber was soon recognized as an outstanding preacher. He served as pastor at Mönchengladbach until his retirement in 1914.

Ludwig Weber died on 29 January 1922 in Bonn, aged 75. A street in Mönchengladbach is named in his honor.

== Social reformer ==
As early as 1878 Weber was in contact with the Berlin court preacher and social reformer Adolf Stoecker (1835–1909). Weber identified the problems caused by social dislocation, growing concentration of wealth in the hands of a few, and vulnerability of industry to fluctuating world markets. He concluded that Christianity could help alleviate the problems if it emphasized love rather than repentance. He was influenced by the ideas of Victor Aimé Huber (1800–69), who had argued for cooperative self-help and profit-sharing by workers. Weber undertook many initiatives to improve the living conditions of workers, and supported full freedom of association and the right of workers to organize. He was critical of the rigid attitude of the Protestant church on social issues.

=== Abolitionism ===
The first effective chapter of the International Abolitionist Federation (IAF) in Germany was organized in 1880 in Berlin, led by Gertrude Guillaume-Schack. It sought to abolish state regulation of prostitution. Liberal Protestant activists in Germany were in close contact with the IAF, and Ludwig Weber was on the IAF executive commission until 1887. However, the conservative Protestants had difficulty with the dominant liberal view that an individual had the right to do whatever they wanted with their body as long as they did not harm or affect the rights of others. The liberals thought the state should defend the rights of citizens but should not impose any particular religious or moral values, while the conservatives thought "the state is the guardian of God's commandments." Conservatives were also unable to accept the outspoken role that women played in the IAF, feeling it was for men to take the initiative.

=== Protestant workers' clubs ===
The first Protestant workers' club was formed in 1882 in Gelsenkirchen. Weber proved to be a strong supporter of these clubs and an effective organizer. For his social work, the leaders of the Evangelical Church held Weber up as an example to all pastors in 1890. At this time there were 50,000 members in the Protestant clubs.

From 1898 Weber headed the Association of Protestant workers' associations in Germany. He used this position to influence social policy and legislation, mainly concentrating on workplace safety and housing. The number of members of the Protestant associations was relatively low compared to other unions, by 1914 consisting of 1,105 workers' associations with about 140,000 members. Over a third were in Rhineland-Westphalia.

=== Evangelical Social Congress ===
In 1890 Kaiser Wilhelm II dismissed Chancellor Otto von Bismarck and proclaimed that the state would be sympathetic to the demands of workers. The Anti-Socialist Laws were repealed at the start of what proved to be only a brief period of openness. Weber and Stoecker founded the Evangelical Social Congress in 1890 with the goal, "to investigate social conditions in our nation, to measure them against the ethical and religious demands of the Gospel, and to make these demands more fruitful and effective in today's economic life." This ambitious program drew opposition from Lutheran theologians, following Adolf von Harnack in his view that Protestants "must adhere to the rule of Luther that the spiritual and the worldly are not to be mixed, and therefore that an economic program may not be proposed in the name of religion." Conservative agrarians and industrialists also opposed and weakened the Social Congress.

In 1895 Wilhelm II dropped his policy of worker conciliation. A campaign by members of the Congress in 1895–96 was directed at a number of pastors and professors who were accused of being too close to the Social Democrats. Stoecker resigned. Weber also left the congress in 1896.

== Publications ==
Publications include:

- Die sociale Organisation des römischen Katholicismus in Deutschland (The social organization of Roman Catholicism in Germany). Strien, Halle a. S.
- Die Behandlung der sozialen Frage auf evangelischer Seite. Ein Bitt- und Mahnwort (The treatment of the social question on the Protestant side) Halle 1888
- Soziales Handbuch (Social handbook). Agentur des Rauhen Hauses, Hamburg 1907.
- Kirchenideale der Gegenwart (Church ideals of the present). Deichert, Leipzig 1912.

== Sources ==
- Dickinson, Edward Ross (2014-02-17). Sex, Freedom, and Power in Imperial Germany, 1880–1914. Cambridge University Press. ISBN 978-1-107-04071-7.
- Flesch, Stefan (2013-03-20). "Ludwig Weber (1846-1922), Sozialreformer". Landschaftsverband Rheinland.
- Miegge, Mario (2001). Capitalisme. Labor et Fides. ISBN 978-2-8309-1005-6.
- Patch, William L. (1985). The Christian Trade Unions in the Weimar Republic, 1918-1933: The Failure of Corporate Pluralism. Yale University Press. ISBN 978-0-300-03328-1.
