= International Abolitionist Federation =

Organisation to abolish regulated prostitution and trafficking of women

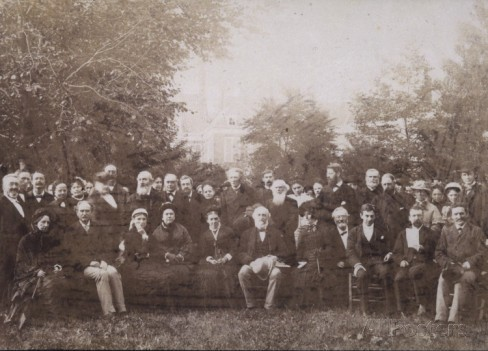
- Attendees at an IAF Conference in Geneva, c. 1900
- Formation: 1875
- Founder: Josephine Butler
- Purpose: Abolition of regulated prostitution
- Formerly called: British, Continental and General Federation for the Abolition of the Government Regulation of Vice

The International Abolitionist Federation (IAF; French: Fédération abolitioniste internationale), founded in Liverpool in 1875, aimed to abolish state regulation of prostitution and fought the international traffic in women in prostitution. It was originally called the British and Continental Federation for the Abolition of Prostitution. (Note: Sources disagree about the original name. One source says it was the "British, Continental and General Federation for the Abolition of the Government Regulation of Vice". Another calls it the "British, Continental and General Federation for the Abolition of Government Regulation of Prostitution". Others call it the "British and Continental (later International) Federation for the Abolition of Governmental (later State) Regulation of Vice".)

The federation was active in Europe, the Americas, and the European colonies and mandated territories. It felt that state regulations encouraged prostitution while having the effect of enslaving women in prostitution. It felt that the solution lay in moral education, empowerment of women through the right to acquire skills and work, and marriage. The federation experienced opposition from the authorities in Europe and the colonies, who were unwilling to relinquish control, and from reformers who wanted to suppress traffic of women but were less concerned with their welfare. After World War I (1914–18), the IAF was involved in discussions about League of Nations conventions on the issues, and after World War II (1939–45), about United Nations conventions. In later years, the main focus was on eliminating unjust regulations that violated women's rights.

== Background ==
The Regulation System of prostitution in the 19th century typically consisted of policing, brothel licenses, red light districts, registration and forced medical examination of women in prostitution, and forced hospitalization of women in prostitution suffering from sexually transmitted diseases. Abuses included police corruption, registration of underage girls, forced registration of vulnerable women, debt bondage and other ways in which women in brothels were exploited, as well as regulations and other practices that prevented women from leaving prostitution. In the colonies and mandated territories, the regulations were often related to military conquest and control.

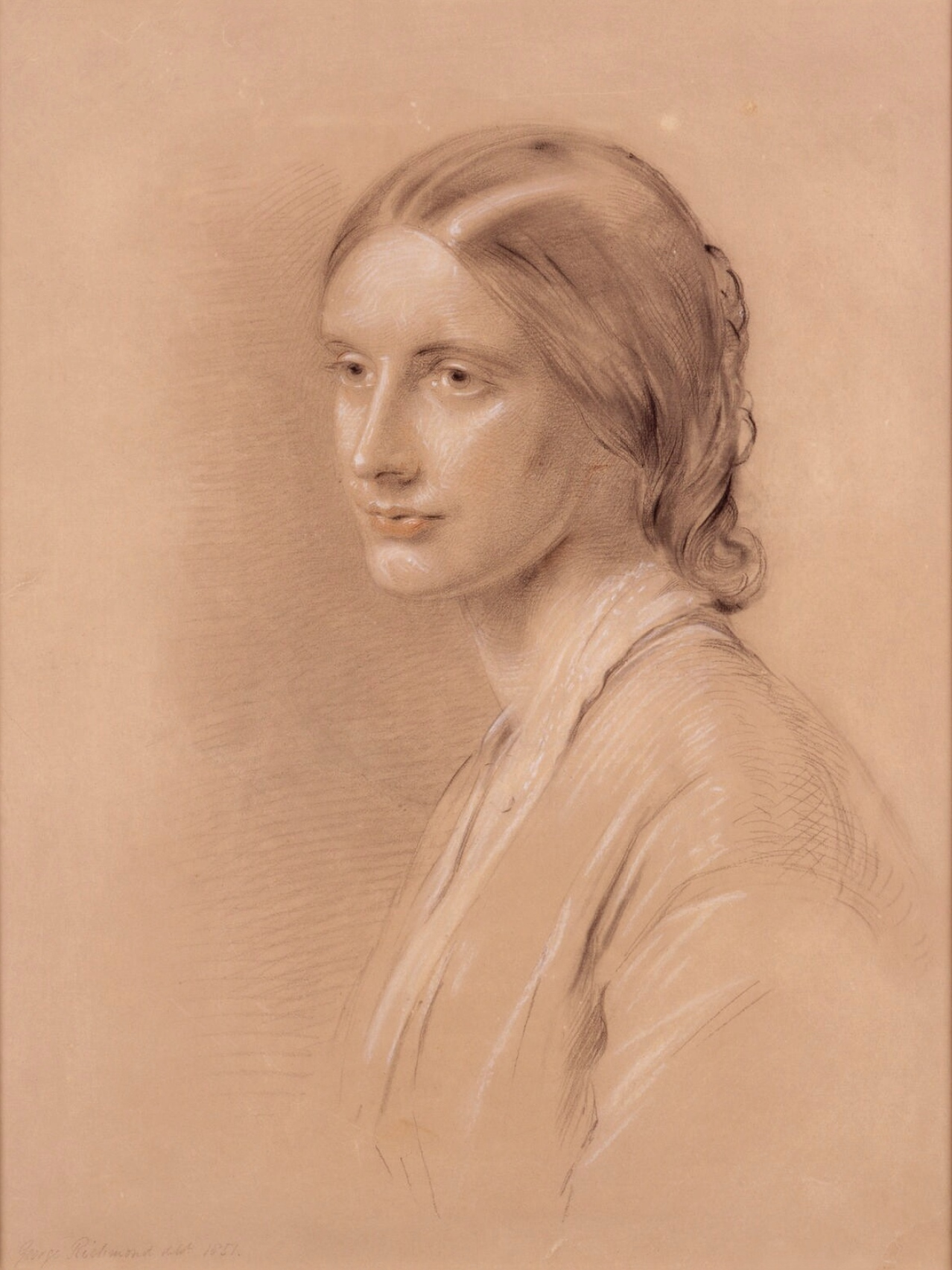
Josephine Butler, founder of the IAF

The English feminist Josephine Butler (1828–1906), who came from a family involved in the abolition of slavery, believed that forced vaginal examination of women suspected of prostitution violated their basic legal rights. She argued that women lacked sexual autonomy because they were excluded from higher education, professional training, and paid employment and therefore had to choose between marriage or prostitution. Either way, their condition was no different from that of a slave. Butler published many articles on the subject. She toured Europe in 1874 and 1875 to raise support for an international abolitionist movement. In Italy she was able to talk with Giuseppe Mazzini and Giuseppe Garibaldi.

== Beliefs ==
Butler and the pastors and friends who joined her at first campaigned for the "freedom and purity of our English Commonwealth", with which they alluded to the liberty of women and to morality and the family. They were against extra-marital sex but also against celibacy, which they felt leads to depravity. The solution was marriage. In 1882, Butler said, "The best of the restrictions imposed by law is that which encourages and, if necessary, forces citizens of both sexes to practice self-respect."

The abolition campaign rested on two main arguments. The first was "scientific evidence" that state regulation was ineffective and even harmful. The second was that regulation was unacceptable even it were effective in terms of administration and health because it violated human liberty. The abolitionists supported the civil rights of women in prostitution and denied that the state had the right to organize prostitution. Abolitionists were against the abuses inherent in state regulations and against restrictions on the basic freedoms of women in prostitution, such as their right to freedom of movement and to voluntary medical examination. Butler asserted that regulation deprived women of the rights bestowed by Magna Carta and the writ of habeas corpus.

The abolitionists pointed out the double standard of contemporary sexual morality due to which women's bodies were policed and controlled but their male customers were not regulated. They pointed out that this resulted in a double injustice "because it is unjust to punish the sex who are the victims of a vice, and leave unpunished the sex who are the main cause both of its vice and its dreaded consequences". Men both caused prostitution and enforced the system that shamed and punished the women who were its victims. The IAF said, "The social rehabilitation of prostitutes cannot solve the problem of prostitution unless other factors influence the causes of prostitution ... Too often prostitutes are subjected to a disguised form of imprisonment, on the pretext of rehabilitation, in spite of laws which do not state prostitution to be an offence." The IAF felt that treating prostitution as a legal or tolerated institution was "a hygienic mistake, a social injustice, a moral outrage, and a judicial crime".

The abolitionists also thought the trafficking of women would be reduced by the abolition of state-regulated prostitution. They were uneasy about cooperating on measures against the white slave traffic with governments that regulated prostitution because they saw the governments as hypocritical in maintaining a system that created demand for the trafficked women.

In the late 19th century, most IAF activists did not have the right to vote because women's suffrage only existed in very few countries. They faced disapproval of open discussion of sexual matters by women. Their efforts to organize were sometimes countered by police repression. The movement struggled to maintain coherence despite the different priorities and beliefs of its members and despite the continued expansion of the colonial and imperial system. The IAF tried to be independent of any particular political, philosophical, religious, or ethnic ties but was in practice dominated by Europeans. The federation often looked to socialists for support, stressing the economic causes of prostitution among women unable to find other employment.

== International meetings ==
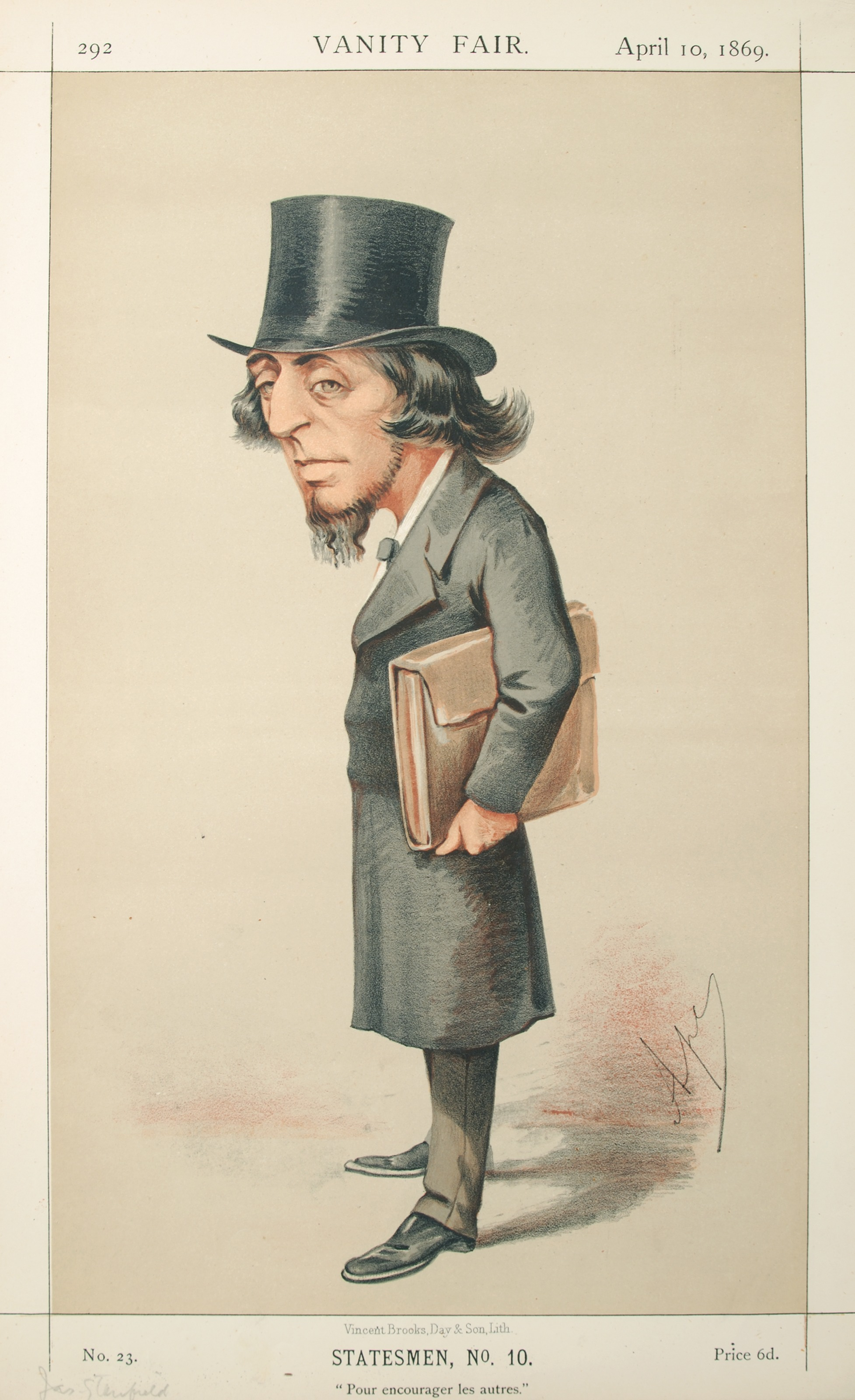
James Stansfeld, general secretary of the federation

Various groups in different countries agitated against sexual slavery in the 1870s. They formed an international federation thanks to the activity of Josephine Butler and a few other feminist leaders. The first meeting of the British branch was held in Liverpool in March 1875 and was attended by Italian representatives. The movement soon spread to other European countries, to European colonies or client states (India, Egypt, and the Dutch East Indies), and to the Americas. A pan-European international congress with six or seven hundred attendees was held in Geneva from 17 to 22 September 1877. The British, Continental, and General Federation for the Abolition of the Government Regulation of Vice was established at this meeting.

The supporters of the federation included a range of women including doctors, religious reformers, and feminists who were also active in organizations such as the International Council of Women and the International Woman Suffrage Alliance. The federation was also supported by liberal or socialist men. It was one of the first unofficial international societies for social and legal reform. The resolutions stressed the importance of self-control, denied that debauchery was inevitable, decried impurity in both men and women, and called for the police to ensure that decency be respected in the street. They also said that "[c]ompulsory registration is an affront to liberty and to common law". There was thus tension between the disapproval of extramarital relations and the demand for women's liberty. The International Union of Friends of Young Women was founded at this congress. This was a Protestant association that gave assistance to emigrating girls and women in an effort to prevent their sexual exploitation.

The federation helped the national abolitionist organizations to communicate and make connections, but activity at the international level was difficult due to the profound differences between the different countries. These included "[t]he differences of language, of national and social traditions, of the state of public opinion and of the laws—and above all, the differences in the status of women". At the international level, the focus had to be strictly on the repeal of state laws and regulations regarding prostitution.

The first annual conference of the federation was held in Paris from 24 to 25 September 1878 in a mood of optimism. James Stansfeld (1820–1898), the general secretary, had been received by Émile Deshayes de Marcère, the French minister of the interior. The second congress of the federation, held in Genoa from 27 September to 4 October 1880, was attended by Yves Guyot and Emilie and Auguste de Morsier. The resolutions of this congress show that the liberal position had triumphed. There was no mention of repression of illicit sexuality, only demands for guarantees of individual liberty, the rule of law, and the abolition of the regulation of prostitution. The British, Continental, and General Federation for the Abolition of Regulated Prostitution held its fifth conference in Geneva in 1889, where it solemnly denounced the international white slave trade. (Note: The term "white slave trade" was generally used before World War I and implied a primary concern with European women in prostitution. The more general term "traffic in women" only came into widespread use in the inter-war period.) The federation moved its headquarters to Geneva in 1898. It became the International Abolitionist Federation in 1902.

== Local abolitionist movements ==
=== Britain ===
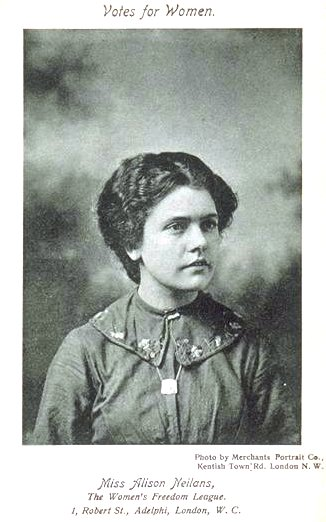
Alison Neilans was the Association for Moral and Social Hygiene (AMSH) general secretary in the 1920s.

In the 1870s Butler helped organize the Ladies National Association for the Repeal of the Contagious Diseases Acts. The Contagious Diseases Acts had extended British regulations of women in prostitution in military areas to cover the whole country. The British, Continental and General Federation for the Abolition of Government Regulation of Prostitution: British Branch was formed in Liverpool on 19 March 1875. The reformers used the name "abolition" as a reference to the earlier movement to abolish slavery, since they considered that state-regulated prostitution was a form of slavery of women. The British branch was based in Liverpool and had an office in Westminster, London. James Stansfeld was president, Josephine Butler secretary and Henry Wilson corresponding secretary. Later William Crosfield was made treasurer and James Stuart replaced Wilson.

The British association saw prostitution as part of the larger issue of social morality and the position of women. Butler was also active in the suffrage movement. The concept that regulation was acceptable in the colonies but not in Europe was completely rejected since the arguments against regulation were considered to be based on universal principles. British reformers also worked in Australia, Ceylon, Gibraltar, Hong Kong, India, Malta, Singapore and South Africa. In 1886 the British Contagious Diseases Act was repealed, a victory for the abolitionists. This was followed by a large meeting to which delegates came from Europe and America to "consolidate the attack on regulation throughout the world".

After the Contagious Diseases Acts were repealed the branch concentrated on eliminating regulation of prostitution in the British Empire, and in India in particular. In 1890 it changed its name to the British Committee for the Abolition of the State Regulation of Vice in India and throughout the British Dominions. In 1897 the branch re-launched the Shield, a periodical that had supported repeal of the Contagious Diseases Act, after this act was re-enacted in India. In 1915 the branch merged with the Ladies National Association for the Repeal of the Contagious Diseases Acts to form the Association for Moral and Social Hygiene (AMSH). The international abolitionist Alison Neilans (1884–1942) was the AMSH general secretary in the 1920s. The AMSH was a member of the IAF.

=== Netherlands ===
Protestant reformers in the Dutch Réveil movement were concerned about the spread of municipal regulation between 1852 and 1877. They published translations of Butler's writings, and ran asylums for women in prostitution. Their main leader was the Reverend Hendrik Pierson. He met Butler at the 1877 congress in Geneva and was persuaded to join the IAF despite his misgivings about the secular nature of the organization and the influence of socialist feminists. In 1889 the Dutch Women's Union, which considered itself an offshoot of the IAF, had 3,000 members working for abolition of regulation and trying to prevent prostitution by assisting young women who were traveling. By the end of the 19th century the Dutch Women's Union had 5,000 members. The feminist and physician Aletta Jacobs signed up to the cause of abolition. Later she was one of the founders of the International Women's Suffrage Alliance, Pierson became president of the IAF in 1898.

=== France ===
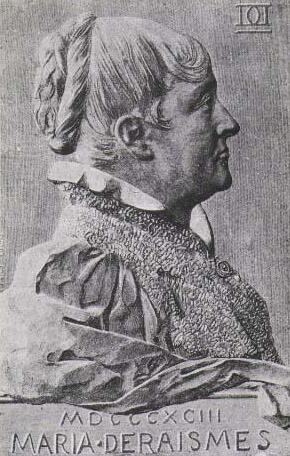
Maria Deraismes (1828–1894) was an early Abolitionist leader in France.

On 15 November 1876 Albert Caise, a founder of the Journal des femmes, launched a petition that called for brothels to be closed, the vice squad abolished, laws passed against provocation on public streets, more dispensaries and the return of women in prostitution to the rule of common law. The petition also called for free, compulsory education and new regulation of women's work. Butler saw Paris as "the great Babylon". In January 1877 Butler traveled to Paris with the main IAF representatives to launch a campaign against the actions of the vice squad, and spoke at various meetings. In her view the French Contagious Diseases Act, and the resulting "French system", caused enslavement of women and encouraged male immorality. She was against the "fetishism of socialist State worship" as well as "medical domination and legislative tyranny."

In an ordinance of 16 June 1879 the police authorized establishment of a French section of the British and Continental Federation, called the Association pour l'abolition de la prostitution réglementée, with Victor Schœlcher (1804–1893) as president. The association included feminists, radicals and abolitionists. The most active organizers of the French Association for the Abolition of Official Prostitution were the feminist leaders Maria Deraismes, Emilie de Morsier and Caroline de Barrau. Josephine Butler visited Paris in April 1880. A meeting on 10 April 1880 was attended by about 2,000 people, mostly of the lower classes, including leaders of the extreme left in Paris. The speeches reflected the growing influence of the feminist movement.

By the end of 1896 the abolitionist movement on France was moribund. Some of the members left the British and Continental Federation and formed a new Ligue pour le relèvement de la moralité publique. The new league called for abolition of the vice squad and the regulations that dishonored the police, compromised the magistrates and established inequality between men and women. The league was also concerned with fighting alcoholism, the white slave trade, immoral literature and license on the streets.

In 1897 Butler visited France, and a group led by Auguste de Morsier initiated re-foundation of a French branch of the IAF. The new organization was represented officially at the international abolitionist conference in London in 1898. Between 1898 and 1907 the abolitionist movement in France revived, led first by Auguste de Morsier and then by Ghénia Avril de Sainte-Croix (1855–1939). (Note: Ghénia Avril de Sainte-Croix, a secular feminist and journalist, remained active in the movement until the mid-1930s. She had met Butler at the 1898 IAF congress in London. She became secretary-general of the French branch of the IAF in 1900. She later became chairperson of the committee on trafficking of the International Council of Women.) In this period the IAF gained fresh support from periodicals. The Revue de morale sociale was dedicated to abolition. A major conference was held in Lyons in 1901 at the height of the campaign.

=== Germany ===
The first effective chapter of the IAF in Germany was organized in 1880 in Berlin, led by Gertrude Guillaume-Schack. Liberal Protestant activists in Germany were in close contact with the IAF, and Ludwig Weber (1846–1922) was on the IAF executive commission until 1887. However, the conservative Protestants had difficulty with the dominant liberal view that an individual had the right to do whatever they wanted with their body as long as they did not harm or affect the rights of others. The liberals thought the state should defend the rights of citizens but should not impose any particular religious or moral values, while the conservatives thought "the state is the guardian of God's commandments." Conservatives were also unable to accept the outspoken role that women played in the IAF, feeling it was for men to take the initiative.

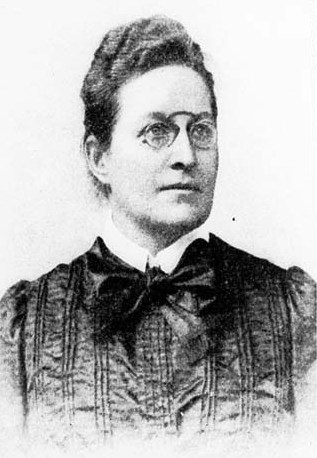
Anna Pappritz of Germany in 1904

In 1898 local associations of the IAF were formed by German women in several cities to fight against brothels and police control over women in prostitution. In 1899 Anna Pappritz (1861–1939) of Berlin met Butler at the International Women's Congress in London. That year she founded and became chairperson of the Berlin branch of the IAF. Anna Pappritz and Katharina Scheven became the two most influential leaders of the German branch of the IAF (DZIAF). From 1902 to 1914 Pappritz and Scheven edited the DZIAF magazine Der Abolitionist.

The pre-war campaign of the DZIAF was largely ineffective. Attempts to revise the laws related to prostitution were abandoned with the outbreak of World War I (1914–18). Eventually the Weimar Republic (1919–33) passed the 1927 Law to Combat Venereal Disease, which abolished state regulation of prostitution. The Berlin chapter of the IAF, later called the League for Protection of Women and Youth (Bund für Frauen- und Jugendschutz), was dissolved in 1933.

=== Colonies and mandated territories ===
By the mid 1920s Australia had in practice been regulating prostitution in Queensland and Western Australia for decades, and was under growing international pressure to abolish these regulations. The IAF significantly affected Australian policy and policing, although the country would resist signing the United Nations abolitionist conventions until the 1970s. The question of trafficking was raised in Australia in 1927, with foreigners blamed. The Attorney General's Department recommended deporting any foreign women in prostitution. However, although the IAF would not object to measures against men involved in trafficking, their position on excluding or repatriating foreign women in prostitution was less clear cut. Repressive measures meant "The prostitute was being considered as a special class which could be driven from place to place." The effect of forced repatriation was to cause considerable economic loss to the women, who arguably would have to work longer in prostitution as a result.

In some areas under the control of the European powers there were high levels of foreign women among the women in prostitution, but after World War I the number of European women declined in areas such as Indochina and the Levant. When the IAF secretary visited Beirut in 1931 she reported that 14% of registered women in prostitution were foreign. The British branch of the IAF showed the clear connection between regulation and trafficking when it quoted the governor of Somaliland saying in 1936, "It will be necessary to regulate in all centers of the Italian African colonies a sufficiently large and often renewed supply of white women of another quality than honest women. They must be white women but not Italian—Italian women of that class should never be allowed to pass the frontiers of our Empire: it is an elementary question of prestige in relation to the natives."

== After World War II ==
After World War II (1939–45) anti-slavery organizations such as the IAF continued to document the traffic in women and girls for the purpose of prostitution or marriage, but operated at the "bottom of the UN human rights hierarchy". In December 1947 representatives of the IAF were among those who provided input into drafting the Universal Declaration of Human Rights. The United Nations' 1949 Convention for the Suppression of the Traffic in Persons and of the Exploitation of the Prostitution of Others was only ratified by a few states since most would have had to first change their laws related to prostitution.

In 1954, the British put forward a draft convention on slavery for the United Nations, which formed the basis for the 1956 Supplementary Convention on the Abolition of Slavery, the Slave Trade, and Institutions and Practices Similar to Slavery. The IAF was involved in discussions of the wording, as were other NGOs such as the Women's International Organization and the Anti-Slavery Society. The IAF was generally opposed to efforts that might weaken the language, which called for abolition of slavery as soon as possible. In 1974, the UN Commission of Human Rights set up the Working Group on Slavery, in which the IAF participated. The working group discussed female genital mutilation, which the IAF argued fitted the definition of slavery since the women affected had lost control of their bodies. Since the main support for the practice came from the mothers of the women, who were certainly not slaves, the working group eventually dropped the issue. In 1985, the IAF provided information to the United Nations Special Rapporteur on Torture and Other Cruel, Inhuman or Degrading Treatment or Punishment.

The federation held its 29th international congress in September 1987 in Vienna, Austria. In France it was associated with organizations that gave shelter and retraining to women in prostitution so they could enter a new occupation. The IAF was involved in the formulation of the United Nations 2000 protocol on trafficking in persons, joining with organizations such as the US-based Coalition Against Trafficking in Persons and the European Women's Lobby. A compromise had to be made with anti-abolitionist NGOs and supporters of sex workers' rights, and the agreed formula therefore restricted the definition to cases involving coercion or deception. It was extended to cover trafficking for other purposes, marking a shift from women's sexuality and morality to a focus on crime and working conditions.

== Opposing views ==
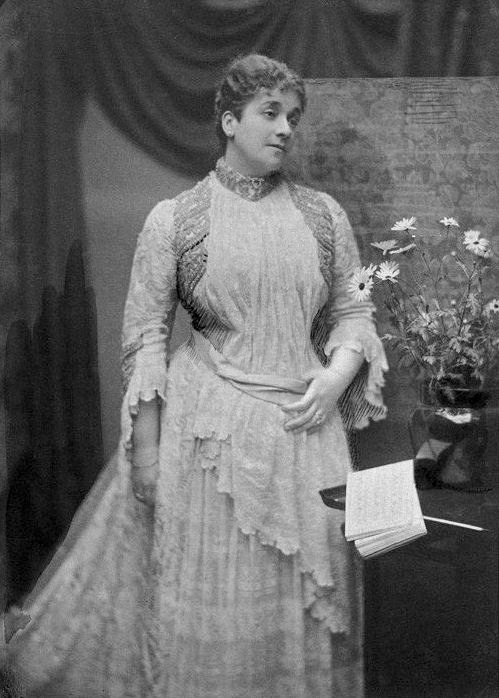
Lady Henry Somerset of the WCTU favored regulation in India.

Authorities in the European countries and their colonial territories often saw abolition of regulations as a threat to their authority. Male-led "purity reformers" also saw no need to protect the rights of women in prostitution. In 1899 the purity reformers founded the International Bureau for the Suppression of the White Slave Traffic (later Traffic in Women and Children, then Traffic in Persons). These later changes in name reflected shifts in focus to include non-white women and boys being trafficked for prostitution. The International Bureau felt the state should have control over the sexual activities of which they disapproved, but avoided the question of regulation. Each national committee of the Bureau wanted to protect the women of their own country from export to foreign brothels, and to criminalize women imported from other countries. The state authorities preferred to work with the International Bureau, which did not challenge their authority to prosecute unregistered women in prostitution and brothels, to import voluntary prostitutes and to deport foreign women in prostitution.

The movement also had to address women who thought regulations should be reformed rather than abolished. These women, often from the upper classes, thought greater control of prostitution would reduce the health risks from sexually transmitted diseases, both for the men buying sex and for their wives, and reduced the risk of women being attacked by men unable to find an outlet for their sexual urges. Thus Lady Henry Somerset, first vice-president of the World's Woman's Christian Temperance Union, advocated reforming regulations in India rather than abolishing them. IAF activists in all countries were consistently opposed to such a position. Supporters of regulation were able to show statements from women in prostitution that they felt safer in brothels than on the streets, health checks let them gain business by showing clients they had a clean bill of health, and government regulation removed the stigma of their occupation. Abolitionists said these were exceptional cases. Interviews by IAF and Women's Christian Temperance Union reformers in India in the late 19th century showed that women in prostitution serving the troops detested the compulsory medical checks.

== Sources ==
- Allain, Jean (2008). The Slavery Conventions: The Travaux Préparatoires of the 1926 League of Nations Convention and the 1956 United Nations Convention. Martinus Nijhoff Publishers. ISBN 978-90-04-15861-0.
- Barry, Kathleen L. (1 July 1996). The Prostitution of Sexuality. NYU Press. ISBN 978-0-8147-2336-4.
- Berkovitch, Nitza (29 April 1999). From Motherhood to Citizenship: Women's Rights and International Organizations. JHU Press. ISBN 978-0-8018-6028-7.
- Boris, Eileen; Janssens, Angelique (1999). Complicating Categories: Gender, Class, Race and Ethnicity. Cambridge University Press. ISBN 978-0-521-78641-6.
- Corbin, Alain (1 September 1996). Women for Hire: Prostitution and Sexuality in France After 1850. Harvard University Press. ISBN 978-0-674-95544-8.
- Dickinson, Edward Ross (17 February 2014). Sex, Freedom, and Power in Imperial Germany, 1880–1914. Cambridge University Press. ISBN 978-1-107-04071-7.
- Doughan, David; Gordon, Peter (3 June 2014). Dictionary of British Women's Organisations, 1825-1960. Routledge. ISBN 978-1-136-89770-2.
- Fauré, Christine (2 June 2004). Political and Historical Encyclopaedia of Women. Routledge. ISBN 978-1-135-45691-7.
- Gorman, Daniel (20 August 2012). The Emergence of International Society in the 1920s. Cambridge University Press. ISBN 978-1-139-53668-4.
- Harrington, Carol (28 March 2013). Politicization of Sexual Violence: From Abolitionism to Peacekeeping. Ashgate Publishing, Ltd. ISBN 978-1-4094-9963-3.
- Janz, Oliver; Schonpflug, Daniel (15 April 2014). Gender History in a Transnational Perspective: Networks, Biographies, Gender Orders. Berghahn Books. ISBN 978-1-78238-275-1.
- Limoncelli, Stephanie (23 February 2010). The Politics of Trafficking: The First International Movement to Combat the Sexual Exploitation of Women. Stanford University Press. ISBN 978-0-8047-6294-6.
- Limoncelli, Stephanie (2013). "Women's International Activism on Trafficking and Prostitution". Women and Social Movements, International— 1840 to Present. Thomas Dublin, Kathryn Kish Sklar and Alexander Street Press. Archived from the original on 6 December 2014.
- Miers, Suzanne (11 June 2003). Slavery in the Twentieth Century: The Evolution of a Global Problem. Rowman Altamira. ISBN 978-0-7591-1616-0.
- Morsink, Johannes (1 January 2011). The Universal Declaration of Human Rights: Origins, Drafting, and Intent. University of Pennsylvania Press. ISBN 978-0-8122-0041-6.
- Pappritz, Anna (1984). "Wie ich zu meiner Arbeit kam (How I came to my work)". In Peters, Dietlinde (ed.). Bürgerlichen Frauenbild des Kaiserreichs. (unpublished manuscript from 1908). Bielefeld.
- Picarelli, John T. (2008). The "modern Day" Trade in Human Beings: How Historical Experience Influences the Contemporary Trafficking in Persons. ISBN 978-0-549-52554-7.
- Ramcharan, B. G. (1989). The Concept and Present Status of the International Protection of Human Rights: Forty Years After the Universal Declaration. Martinus Nijhoff Publishers. ISBN 90-247-3759-1.
- Reinert, Kirsten (2001). "Pappritz, Anna". Neue Deutsche Biographie. Vol. 20.
- Roth, Venla (9 December 2011). Defining Human Trafficking and Identifying Its Victims: A Study on the Impact and Future Challenges of International, European and Finnish Legal Responses to Prostitution-Related Trafficking in Human Beings. Martinus Nijhoff Publishers. ISBN 978-90-04-20924-4.
- Smith, Jill Suzanne (28 February 2014). Berlin Coquette: Prostitution and the New German Woman, 1890–1933. Cornell University Press. ISBN 978-0-8014-6970-1.
- Territo, Leonard; Kirkham, George (2010). International Sex Trafficking of Women & Children: Understanding the Global Epidemic. Looseleaf Law Publications. ISBN 978-1-932777-86-4.
