= Uszyce =

- Village
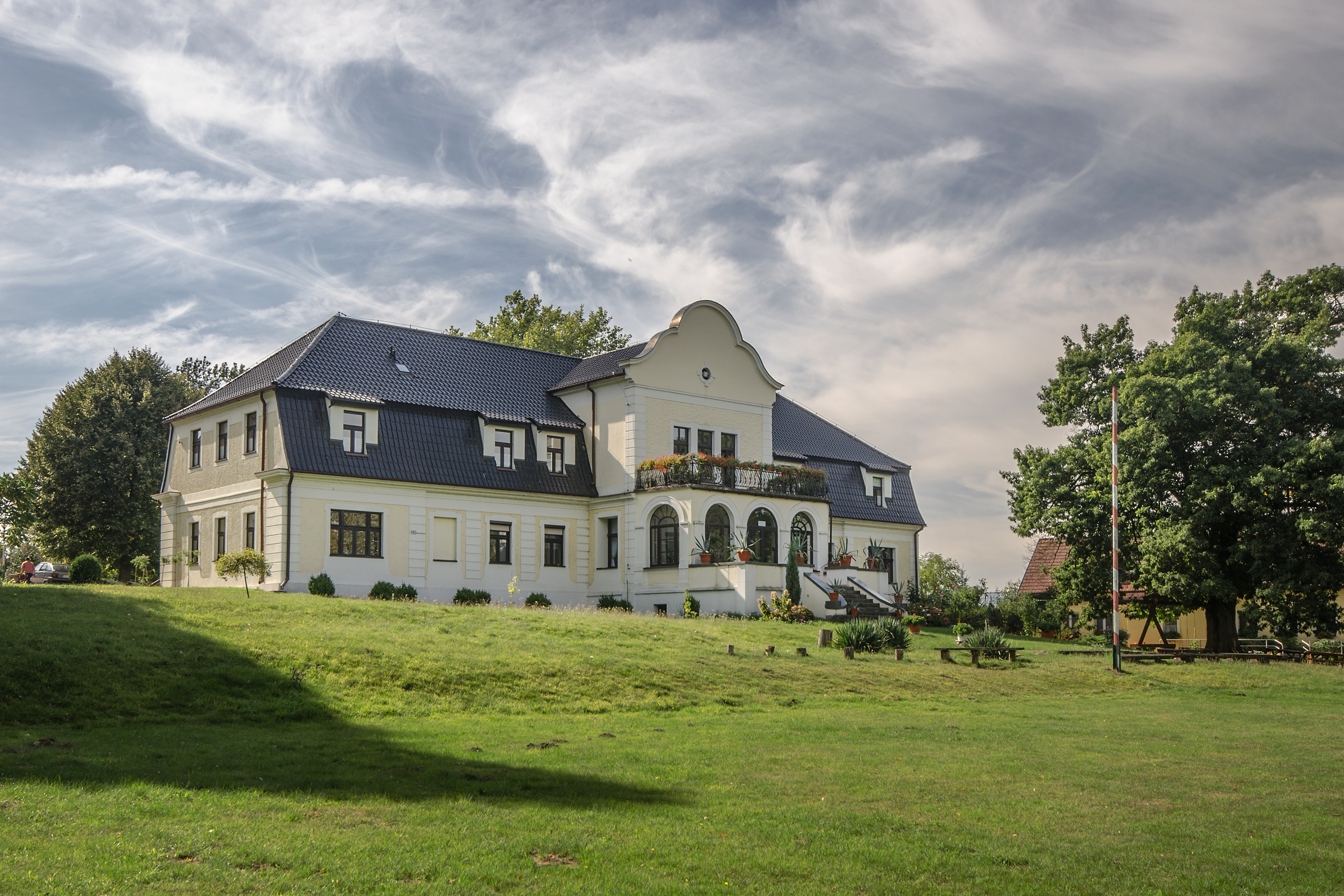
- Palace

- Location within Poland
- Coordinates: 51°7′N 18°21′E
- Country: Poland
- Voivodeship: Opole
- County: Olesno
- Gmina: Gorzów Śląski
- Time zone: UTC+1 (CET)
  - Summer (DST): UTC+2 (CEST)
- Vehicle registration: OOL

Uszyce [uˈʂɨt͡sɛ] (German Uschütz) is a village in the administrative district of Gmina Gorzów Śląski, within Olesno County, Opole Voivodeship, in south-western Poland.

== Notable residents ==
- Emanuel Kania (1827-1887), Polish composer born in Uszyce
- Gertrude Guillaume-Schack (1845–1903), German women's rights activist
