= Emanuel Kania =

Polish composer

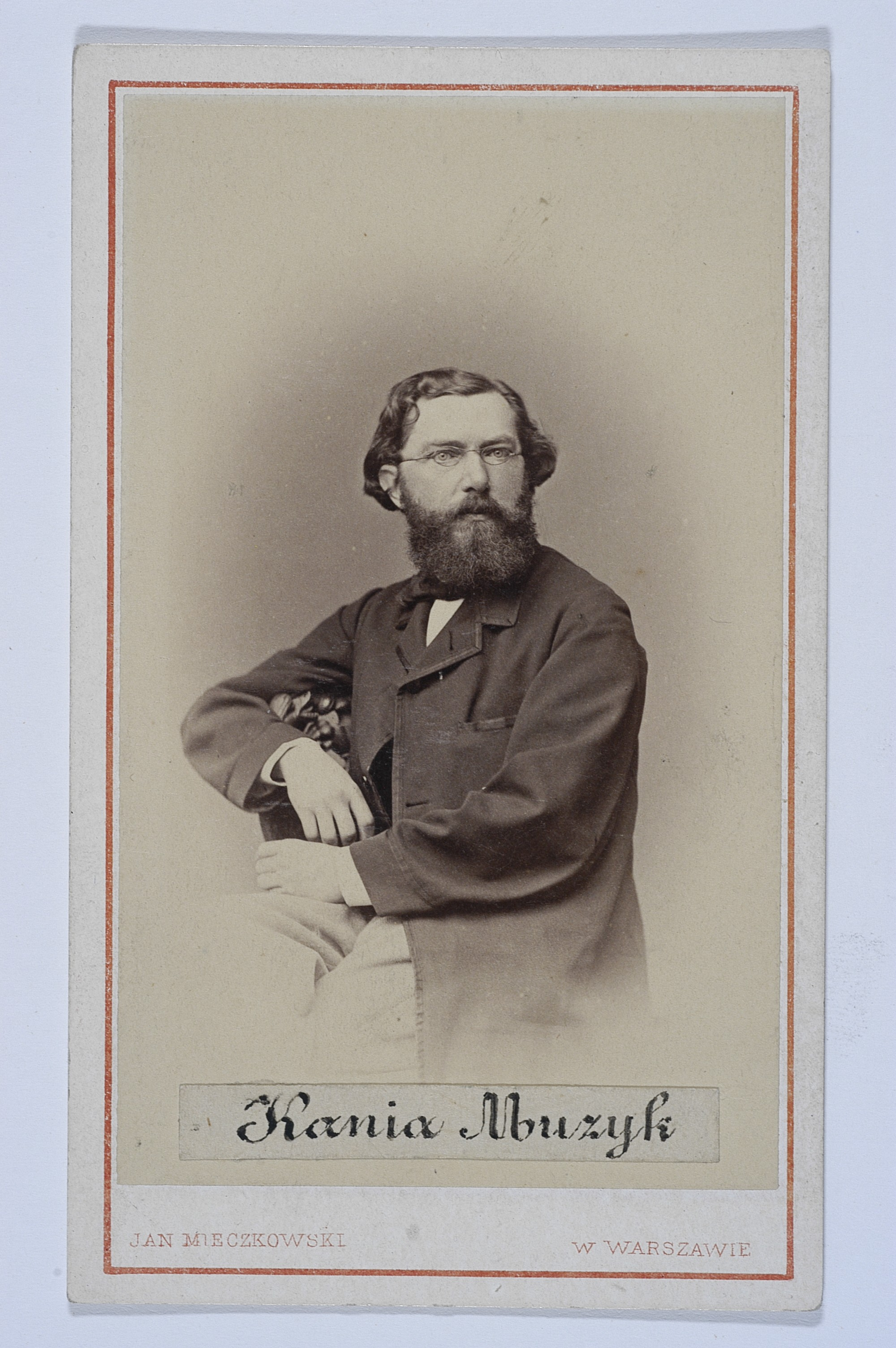
Emanuel Kania circa 1870

Emanuel Kania (Uszyce in Opole, Silesia, 26 March 1827 — Warsaw 16 March 1887) was a Polish composer. He studied in Wrocław, Paris and Berlin, then settled in Warsaw in 1853, where he worked for the rest of his life.

== Recordings ==
Emanuel Kania: Songs Dawid Biwo (bass-baritone), Dominika Peszko (piano) June 2020 DUX7603
