= Women's International Council of Socialist and Labour Organizations =

The Women's International Council of Socialist and Labour Organizations was a body established within the Second International to enable special conferences of the socialist and labour movements to be held. It was founded at the First International Conference of Socialist Women in Stuttgart, 1907.

== National sections ==
The Council organised the Second International Women's Conference in Copenhagen in 1910, at which it was resolved to form national sections.

=== British Section ===
The British Section was formed with Margaret Bondfield as chair, with Margaret McDonald as secretary. Both these women came from the Women's Labour League (WLL). Ethel Bentham, another prominent member of the WLL participated as the representative of the Fabian Society.
