= Max Kretzer =

German writer (1854–1941)

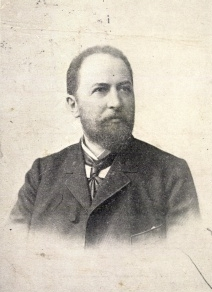
- Max Kretzer from an 1897 postcard by Bart und Jacke
- Born: 7 July 1854; Posen, Prussia
- Died: 15 July 1941 (aged 87); Berlin. Germany
- Occupation: Author
- Known for: Social realism

Max Kretzer (7 June 1854 – 15 July 1941) was a German writer. He left school at the age of thirteen and worked in a factory for twelve years. He became a prolific and successful novelist in the social realist style, depicting common working people.

== Life ==
Max Kretzer was born on 7 June 1854 in Posen, then in Prussia. His father was the main tenant of the Odeum, an establishment in which the provincial bourgeoisie held cultural events. His father attempted to establish himself as an innkeeper, but failed. With the family impoverished, at the age of 13 Max Kretzer had to leave school. He moved to Berlin, where his father worked as a craftsman, and for twelve years worked in a factory.

Although poorly educated, Kretzer began a career as a self-taught writer after an accident at work in 1879. He joined the Social Democrats the same year. At first he published short sketches, then a long series of novels, which sold about one million copies in his lifetime. At that period this was a large number. Despite this success, Kretzer was often poverty-stricken. After 1933 Kretzer sympathized with Nazism. He died on 15 July 1941 in Berlin.

== Work ==
Kretzer's work shows an ethical and increasingly Christian socialism, e.g. in "Das Gesicht Christi" (i.e. The Face of Christ), in which Jesus appears and fights "modern" degeneracy. He was one of the first naturalist writers, and the first to describe crafts and industrial workers. He was seen by his contemporaries as "the pioneer of the Berlin novel". Works include:

- Die beiden Genossen (The Two Comrades), Berlin 1880
- Strange Enthusiast, Berlin, 2 volumes (1881)
- Die Betrogenen (The Deceived), Berlin, 2 volumes (1882)
- Schwarzkittel oder die Geheimnisse des Lichthofes (Black Coat or the Secrets of the Atrium), Leipzig [u. a.] 1882
- Berliner Novellen und Sittenbilder, Jena
  - Vol. 1. Polizeiberichte, 1883
  - Vol. 2. Die Zweiseelenmenschen, 1883
- Gesammelte Berliner Skizzen, Berlin [u. a.] 1883
- Die Verkommenen, Berlin, 2 volumes, 1883
- Im Sturmwind des Socialismus, Berlin 1884
- Drei Weiber, Jena, 2 volumes, 1886
- Im Riesennest, Leipzig 1886
- Im Sündenbabel, Leipzig 1886
- Bürgerlicher Tod, Dresden [u. a.] 1888
- Meister Timpe, Berlin 1888
- Ein verschlossener Mensch, Leipzig, 2 volumes. (1888)
- Das bunte Buch, Dresden [u. a.] 1889
- Die Bergpredigt, Dresden [u. a.], 2 volumes, 1890
- Onkel Fifi, Berlin 1890
- Gefärbtes Haar, Dresden [u. a.] 1891
- Der Millionenbauer, Leipzig [Roman]; historischer Hintergrund siehe: Millionenbauern, 2 volumes, 1891
- Der Millionenbauer, Leipzig 1891 [Theaterstück]
- Irrlichter und Gespenster, Weimar, 3 volumes, 1892–93
- Der Baßgeiger. Das verhexte Buch, Leipzig 1894
- Die Buchhalterin, Dresden 1894
- Die gute Tochter, Dresden 1895
- Ein Unberühmter und andere Geschichten, Dresden [u. a.] 1895
- Der Blinde. Maler Ulrich, Dresden [u. a.] 1896
- Das Gesicht Christi, Leipzig [u. a.] 1896
- Frau von Mitleid und andere Novellen, Berlin 1896
- Furcht vor dem Heim und andere Novellen, Leipzig 1897
- Berliner Skizzen, Berlin 1898
- Der Sohn der Frau, Dresden [u. a.] 1899
- Verbundene Augen, Berlin, 2 volumes, 1899
- Großstadtmenschen, Berlin 1900
- Der Holzhändler, Berlin, 2 volumes, 1900
- Die Kunst zu heirathen, Berlin 1900
- Die Verderberin, Berlin 1900
- Warum?, Leipzig 1900
- Die Madonna vom Grunewald, Leipzig 1901
- Das Räthsel des Todes und andere Geschichten, Dresden 1901
- Der wandernde Thaler, Leipzig 1902
- Magd und Knecht, Berlin 1903
- Die Sphinx in Trauer, Berlin 1903
- Treibende Kräfte, Berlin-Charlottenburg 1903
- Familiensklaven, Berlin 1904
- Das Armband, Berlin 1905
- Der Mann ohne Gewissen, Berlin 1905
- Was ist Ruhm?, Berlin-Charlottenburg, 1905
- Herbststurm, Berlin-Charlottenburg 1906
- Das Kabarettferkel und andere neue Berliner Geschichten, Berlin 1907
- Leo Lasso, Jauer [u. a.] 1907
- Söhne ihrer Väter, Jauer [u. a.] 1907
- Das Hinterzimmer, Jauer [u. a.] 1908
- Mut zur Sünde, Glogau [u. a.] 1909
- Reue, Leipzig 1910
- Waldemar Tempel, Leipzig 1911
- Die blanken Knöpfe, Leipzig 1912
- Lebensbilder, Leipzig 1912
- Das Mädchen aus der Fremde, Leipzig 1913
- Steh auf und wandle, Leipzig 1913
- Gedichte, Dresden 1914
- Der irrende Richter, Dresden 1914
- Die alten Kämpen, Berlin 1916
- Berliner Geschichten, Berlin 1916
- Ignaz Serbynski, Berlin [u. a.] 1918
- Der Nachtmensch, Berlin [u. a.] 1918
- Kreuz und Geißel, Leipzig 1919
- Was das Leben spinnt, Berlin 1919
- Wilder Champagner, Leipzig 1919
- Assessor Lankens Verlobung, Berlin 1920
- Fidus Deutschling, Germanias Bastard, Dessau 1921
- Die Locke, Berlin 1922
- Der Rückfall des Doktor Horatius, Leipzig 1935
- Meister Timpe, Berlin: Das Neue Berlin, 1949

== Sources ==
- "Max Kretzer". Projekt Gutenberg-DE. Der Spiegel. Archived from the original on November 4, 2014.
