= Lina Morgenstern =

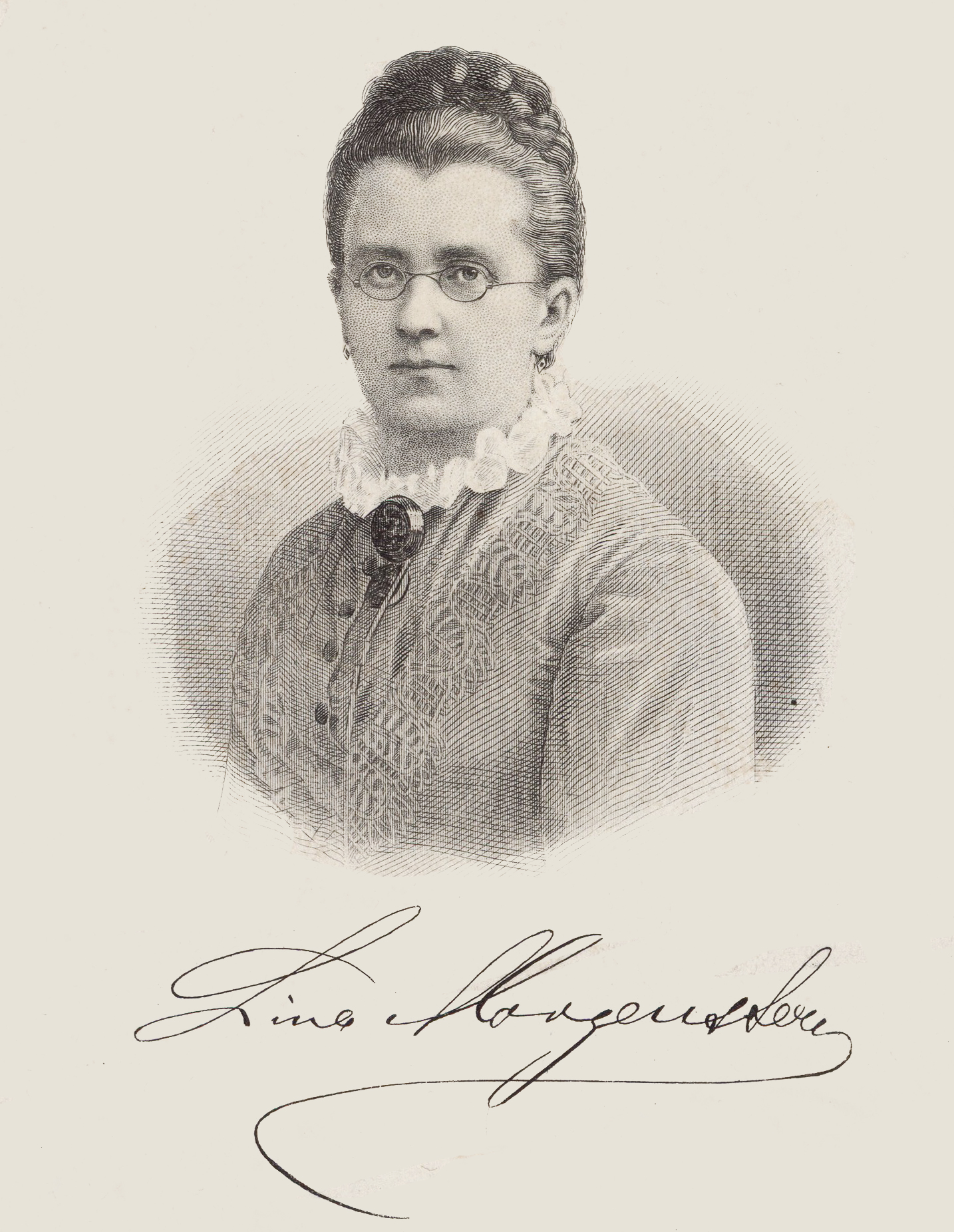
- Lina Morgenstern
- Born: November 25, 1830; Breslau, German Empire
- Died: December 16, 1909 (aged 79); Berlin, German Empire
- Burial place: Weißensee cemetery, Berlin

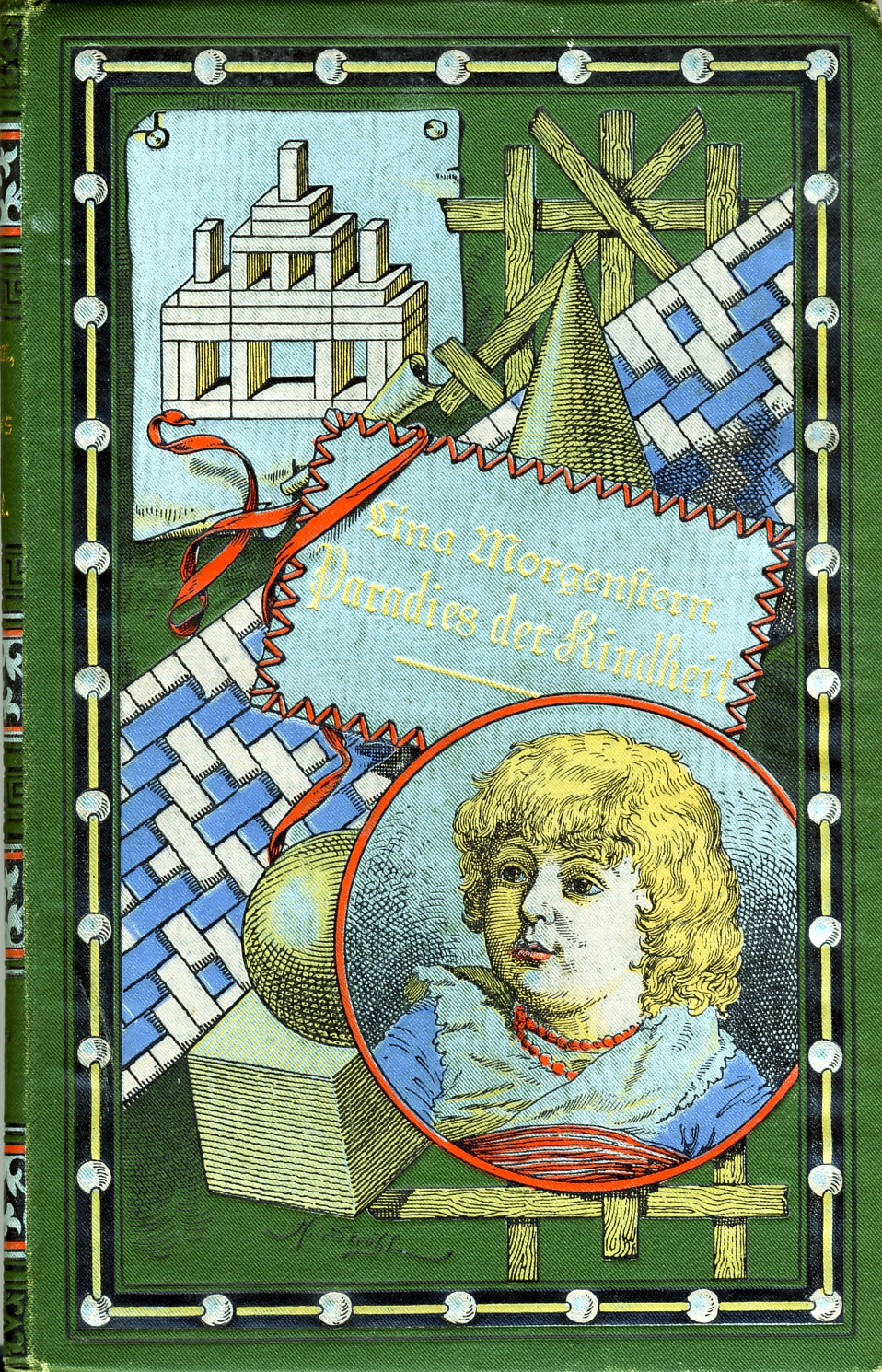
Paradies der Kindheit, 1900

Lina Morgenstern (25 November 1830 – 16 December 1909) was a German writer, educator, feminist and pacifist.

== Biography ==
She was born 25 November 1830 in Wrocław (German Breslau) to a Jewish family committed to social causes. In 1854, she married Theodor Morgenstern (1827–1910), and they moved to Berlin. The couple had five children – three daughters (Clara, Olga, and Martha) and two sons (Michael and Alfred).

Morgenstern started writing articles about education and children's care in order to contribute to the family's income, when her husband had financial problems. In 1859, the same year that her third child, Olga, was born, she and Adolf Lette founded the Berliner Frauen-Verein zur Beförderung der Fröbel’schen Kindergärten (Berlin women's association for the advancement of Fröbelian kindergartens), which advocated for the establishment in Berlin of kindergartens, a form of preschool education conceived of by the pedagogue Friedrich Fröbel. Morgenstern served as chair from 1862 to 1866, by which time the society had established eight kindergartens in the city, as well as a school for the education of kindergarten teachers.

In 1866, during the Austro-Prussian War, she founded Berlin's first Volksküche ('public kitchen,' or soup kitchen), an organization that offered nutritional meals at very low prices (reflecting at most the cost of preparation), based on a philosophy of helping needy people without putting them in the position of accepting outright charity.

In 1896, she organised the Internationaler Kongress für Frauenwerke und Frauenbestrebungen in Berlin and she entered in the directive committee of the German Peace Society (DFG) in 1897.

She died 16 December 1909, in Berlin. She was buried in Weißensee cemetery.

== Works ==
- Das Bienenkätchen (Breslau, 1859)
- Das Paradies der Kindheit durch Spiel, Gesang und Beschäftigung (Leipzig, 1861)
- Ernährungslehre (1880)
- Die Frauen des 19. Jahrhunderts (1888–91)
- Der häusliche Beruf (1890)
- Illustriertes Universal-Kochbuch für Gesunde und Kranke (Berlin, 1905)
