= Lore Maria Peschel-Gutzeit =

German judge and politician (1932–2023)

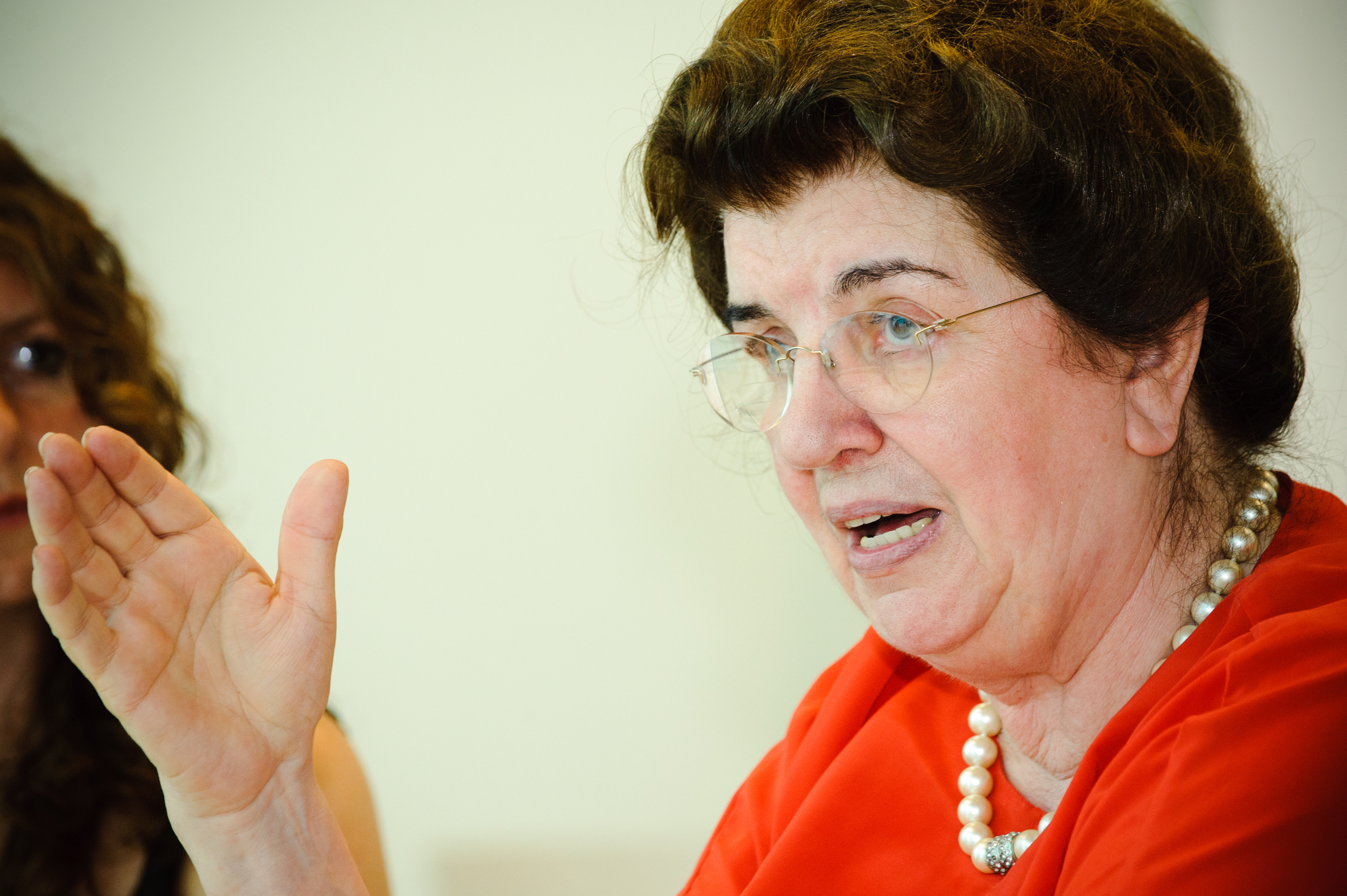
- Lore Maria Peschel-Gutzeit in 2010

Senator for Justice of Hamburg
- In office 1991–1993
- Nominated by: SPD

Senator for Justice of Berlin
- In office 1994–1997
- Nominated by: SPD
- Preceded by: Jutta Limbach
- Succeeded by: Michael Müller

Senator for Justice of Hamburg
- In office 2001–2001
- Nominated by: SPD

Personal details
- Born: 26 October 1932 Hamburg, Germany
- Died: September 2, 2023 (aged 90) Berlin, Germany
- Party: Social Democratic Party (SPD)
- Spouses: Terminally ill colleague (first marriage, ended due to his death in 1958); Horst Peschel (m. 1961; div. 1973)
- Children: 3
- Education: University of Hamburg; Albert-Ludwigs University (Freiburg)
- Occupation: Jurist, Politician

Lore Maria Peschel-Gutzeit (26 October 1932 – 2 September 2023) was a German judge and politician. Born in Hamburg, she became an advocate for family law, children's rights, and gender equality. As the first female president of a family senate, (Note: The term Senat (senate) can refer to the bench in higher courts of appeal or to the executive branch in Bundesländer which form a City State (Berlin, Bremen and Hamburg).) she served as Senator for Justice in Hamburg and Berlin. She implemented key legislation promoting gender equality. Recognized with the Marie Juchacz Women's Prize in 2019, she continued her legal career until her death in Berlin on 2 September 2023, at the age of 90.

== Early life ==
Peschel-Gutzeit was born in Hamburg as the daughter of a teacher and a major general. Her mother's family, which suffered during World War I, also hailed from Hamburg. Peschel-Gutzeit's biological father didn't play a significant role in her life. In her autobiography, she referred to her adoptive father, former Nazi General Hans Gutzeit, as her biological father. However, he formally adopted her only after she reached adulthood. Until then, she bore her mother's name, Brüggmann. She had a half-sister who was four years older from her mother's first marriage. After the bombing of Hamburg and being sent away as part of the children's evacuation, she returned to Hamburg in 1946 with her half-sister.

== Career ==
Peschel-Gutzeit studied law from 1951 at the University of Hamburg and the Albert-Ludwigs University in Freiburg, completing her legal education in 1959 with the Second State Examination in Law. Following this, she briefly practiced as a lawyer before assuming the role of a judge at the Regional Court of Hamburg. Early in her career, Peschel-Gutzeit focused on family law, children's rights, and gender equality. She served as the chairwoman of the German Association of Women Lawyers (Deutscher Juristinnenbund) from 1977 to 1981 and joined the Social Democratic Party (SPD) in 1988.

Starting in 1972, she served as a family judge at the Hanseatic Higher Regional Court in Hamburg. In 1984, following some internal conflicts, she became the first woman appointed as the chair of a family senate. In 1990, she earned her Doctor of Juridical Science (Dr. jur.) from the University of Freiburg with her thesis titled 'The Right to Access to One's Own Child: A Systematic Presentation.'

In 1988, as part of Emma magazine's PorNO campaign, a legislative proposal aiming to establish a German law against pornography, developed in collaboration with Peschel-Gutzeit, was published; however, it did not get implemented.

In 1991, she was elected by the Hamburg Parliament to the Senate (government) and became the Senator for Justice. She held this position until the end of 1993, when the SPD lost the absolute majority and formed a coalition with the STATT Party (Voscherau III Senate).

In 1994, she succeeded Jutta Limbach as the Senator for Justice in Berlin under the Eberhard Diepgen Senate (Diepgen III Senate).

She left this office in 1997 to once again assume the position of Senator for Justice in Hamburg, this time under Ortwin Runde (SPD) in a coalition with the Alliance 90/The Greens. After the government lost its majority in the parliamentary election on 23 September 2001, Peschel-Gutzeit left office and retired from politics. She implemented corresponding legislative proposals, such as the 'Lex Peschel' (§ 92 BBG), which stipulated that civil servants could work part-time for family reasons. She also advocated for the 'right to vote from birth,' allowing parents to exercise this right on behalf of their children until they reached adulthood, as discussed in the Neue Juristische Wochenschrift.

She advocated for joint parental custody and children's rights. In 2019, she founded the family and inheritance law firm Peschel-Gutzeit, Fahrenbach & Breuer on Berlin's Kurfürstendamm, where she continued practicing law until her death at the age of 90.

In 2019, she was honored with the Marie Juchacz Women's Prize of the State of Rhineland-Palatinate for her pioneering work in the field of women's rights.

== Personal life ==
Her first marriage, to a terminally ill colleague, ended in 1958 due to his death and they remained childless. She remarried and had three children with her second husband. Peschel-Gutzeit published her autobiography, 'Naturally Equal', in 2012. She died on 2 September 2023, in Berlin.

== Awards and recognitions ==
Awards and recognitions
Year	Award	References
2004	Senior citizen of Berlin	
2004	Order of Merit 1st Class of the Federal Republic of Germany	
2014	Hammonia Prize of the State Women's Council Hamburg	
2019	Marie Juchacz Women's Prize of the State of Rhineland-Palatinate	

== Publications ==
- Verfahren und Rechtsmittel in Familiensachen [Procedures and Remedies in Family Matters]. Seminarschriften der Deutschen Anwaltsakademie (in German). München: Beck. 1988. ISBN 978-3-406-33070-4. OCLC 22555081.
- Das Recht zum Umgang mit dem eigenen Kinde: Eine systematische Darstellung. Kommentar [The Right to Access to One's Own Child: A Systematic Presentation] (in German). Berlin: De Gruyter. 1989. ISBN 978-3-11-241891-8. OCLC 1238210028.
- As editor: Das Nürnberger Juristen-Urteil von 1947: historischer Zusammenhang und aktuelle Bezüge [The Nuremberg Jurists' Trial of 1947: Historical Context and Current References] (in German) (1st ed.). Baden-Baden: Nomos. 1996. ISBN 978-3-7890-4528-8. OCLC 38598869.
- Aufarbeitung von Systemunrecht durch die Justiz [Dealing with Systemic Injustice through the Judiciary] (in German). Presse- und Informationsstelle der Freien Universität. 1996. ISBN 978-3-930208-07-4. OCLC 44737830.
- Unterhaltsrecht aktuell: die Auswirkungen der Unterhaltsreform auf die Beratungspraxis [Current Maintenance Law: The Effects of Maintenance Reform on Advisory Practice] (in German). Nomos. 2008. ISBN 978-3-8329-2220-7. OCLC 239519222.
- Autobiography written with Brüdgam, Nele-Marie (2013). Selbstverständlich gleichberechtigt: eine autobiographische Zeitgeschichte [Naturally Equal: Hoffmann and Campe] (in German) (2nd ed.). Hamburg: Hoffmann und Campe. ISBN 978-3-455-50248-0. OCLC 864593889.
