= Europäische Zeitschrift für Wirtschaftsrecht =

The Europäische Zeitschrift für Wirtschaftsrecht (European Journal of Business Law. Revue Européenne de Droit Économique, ISSN 0937-7204) is an academic journal which specialises in European law with a special focus on business law. It was established in 1990 and is published by C. H. Beck. The editions are released bimonthly.
