= Emma Ihrer =

German feminist and trade unionist

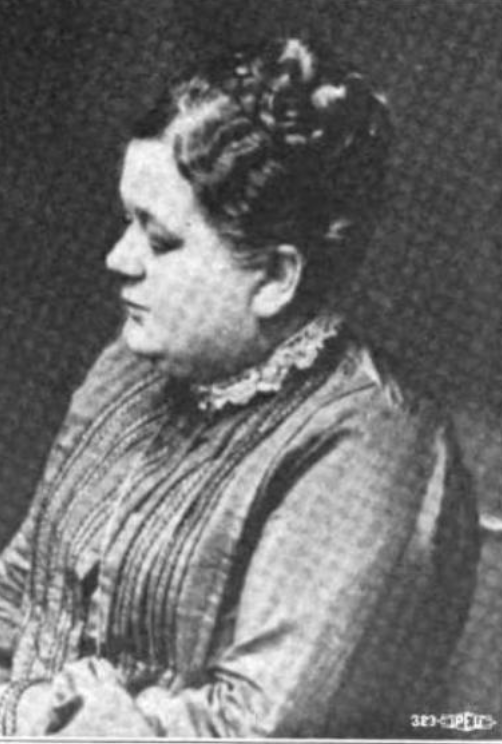
- Ihrer, from a 1914 publication
- Born: Emma Rother; 3 January 1857; Glatz, Lower Silesia, Germany
- Died: 8 January 1911 (aged 54); Berlin, Germany
- Occupations: Feminist, socialist

Emma Ihrer (3 January 1857 – 8 January 1911) was a German feminist and trade unionist who was active in founding societies to defend the rights of women workers.

== Background ==
Emma Ihrer was born at a time when women were disenfranchised, and under the reactionary Prussian Association law of 1850 were forbidden participation in political associations. The authorities could define "political" as they chose. In October 1878 the first of the Anti-Socialist Laws arbitrarily deprived members of the Social Democratic Party and those associated with it of the right of association. It was not until the Association Act of 15 May 1908 that women were allowed to take part in political activities and organizations. Working women faced opposition from working men, who saw them as unwelcome competition, as well as from the authoritarian state which denied them basic civil rights.

== Early years ==
Emma Rother was born on 3 January 1857 in Glatz, Lower Silesia, the daughter of a shoemaker. She was given a strict Roman Catholic upbringing. At an early age she was married to Emmanuel Ihrer, an apothecary twenty-two years her senior. They moved to Berlin in 1881. Emma Ihrer found work as a milliner.

Emma Ihrer first spoke in public at a meeting on "How to raise the morality of the workers". She expressed the view that prostitution is just part of the misery of the workers, and called for the elimination of the vice squad, which was part of the problem. On 13 November 1883 Emma Ihrer founded the socialist and feminist Frauen-Hilfsverein für Handarbeiterinnen ("Aid Society for Women Manual Workers"). The goal was to encourage its members materially and spiritually, to represent the interests of its members in the workplace, to grant loans in emergencies and to pay disability benefits. Further plans to establish work places for some types of women's work, set up a reading room and a dining house did not materialise. Emma's enthusiasm declined as she saw the association engaged only in minor reforms.

On 26 February 1885, Emma Ihrer, Marie Hofmann, Pauline Staegemann and Gertrude Guillaume-Schack founded the Verein zur Wahrung der Interessen der Arbeiterinnen ("Society for the Protection of Women Workers' Interests"). The society functioned primarily as a support group in which doctors and lawyers offered their services free of charge. Ihrer was secretary of the board. A Berlin branch was founded, and similar organisations were founded by women across the Reich. The garment workers were particularly active, and it was through their influence that the Reichstag decided in favour of an official survey of wages in the lingerie and clothing industry. The association also ensured that the industrial code included provisions against usury with work materials. In April 1886 the association was banned on the grounds that it was political. Hofmann, Staegemann, Ihrer and Johanna Jagert were tried in court. When the police forcibly disbanded the club it had over a thousand members.

== Union leader ==
In 1889 Ihrer and Clara Zetkin (1857–1933) went as SPD delegates to the International Socialist Congress in Paris. This was the founding congress of the Second International. They presented a motion against discrimination against female employment that ensured that women had equal rights in the trade union movement. In the fall of 1890 the Prussian government abolished the Anti-Socialist laws, making it possible to conduct union work with relatively little interference. On 16–17 November 1890 the historic first conference of German trade unions was held, at which a Generalkommission der Gewerkschaften Deutschlands ("General Commission of German Trade Unions") was established. Ihrer insisted that the statutes allowed for female membership, (Note: The SPD regulation that required election of women was preserved until 1894. Paradoxically it had the effect of causing over-representation of women in the senior levels, since there were relatively few women in the rank and file. This changed when the number of women members surged after restrictions on women's political association were lifted in 1908, but the merger of women's organizations into the mainstream had the effect of diluting their influence.) and was elected the sole women in the seven-person board of the General Commission. She was widely recognized in the press as "the soul of all agitation among socialist women".

Ihrer found that decades after the SPD had been formed there was still no mass movement of proletarian women, a result due to male supremacist assumptions within the party as well as to legal barriers. Ihrer founded the weekly newspaper Die Arbeiterin (The Woman Worker), whose first number appeared in January 1891, but it had little success. This was a successor to the short-lived Die Staatsbürgerin (The Citizeness) founded by Gertrude Guillaume-Schack and banned in June 1886. By January 1892 the sheet was facing financial ruin and was placed in the hands of Clara Zetkin by the SPD-affiliated Dietz-Verlag. Zetkin renamed the paper Die Gleichheit (Equality) when she took over. As the titles suggest, The Citizeness was aimed at women seeking political rights, The Woman Worker at proletarian women and Equality at women seeking full equal rights. By 1900 Ihrer's name had disappeared from the newspaper.

Ihrer founded other feminist societies, which were generally socialist in nature, which resulted in almost constant trouble with the police. In 1893 Ihrer published a brochure on the origin and development of workers' organizations in Germany, and in 1898 published an influential paper on workers in the class struggle. At the 1900 SPD conference Ihrer demanded that the Social Democratic principle of equality should not remain theoretical but should be put into practice. In 1903 Ihrer was made chairperson of an association of female industrial workers. In 1904 a trade union women's committee was constituted with Ihrer as chair, with the goal of advancing women's work and helping implement appropriate decisions in the Congress. She helped found the servants' organization, the Union of Domestic Workers of Germany, and spent a period as president of the Union of Flower, Feather and Leaf Workers.

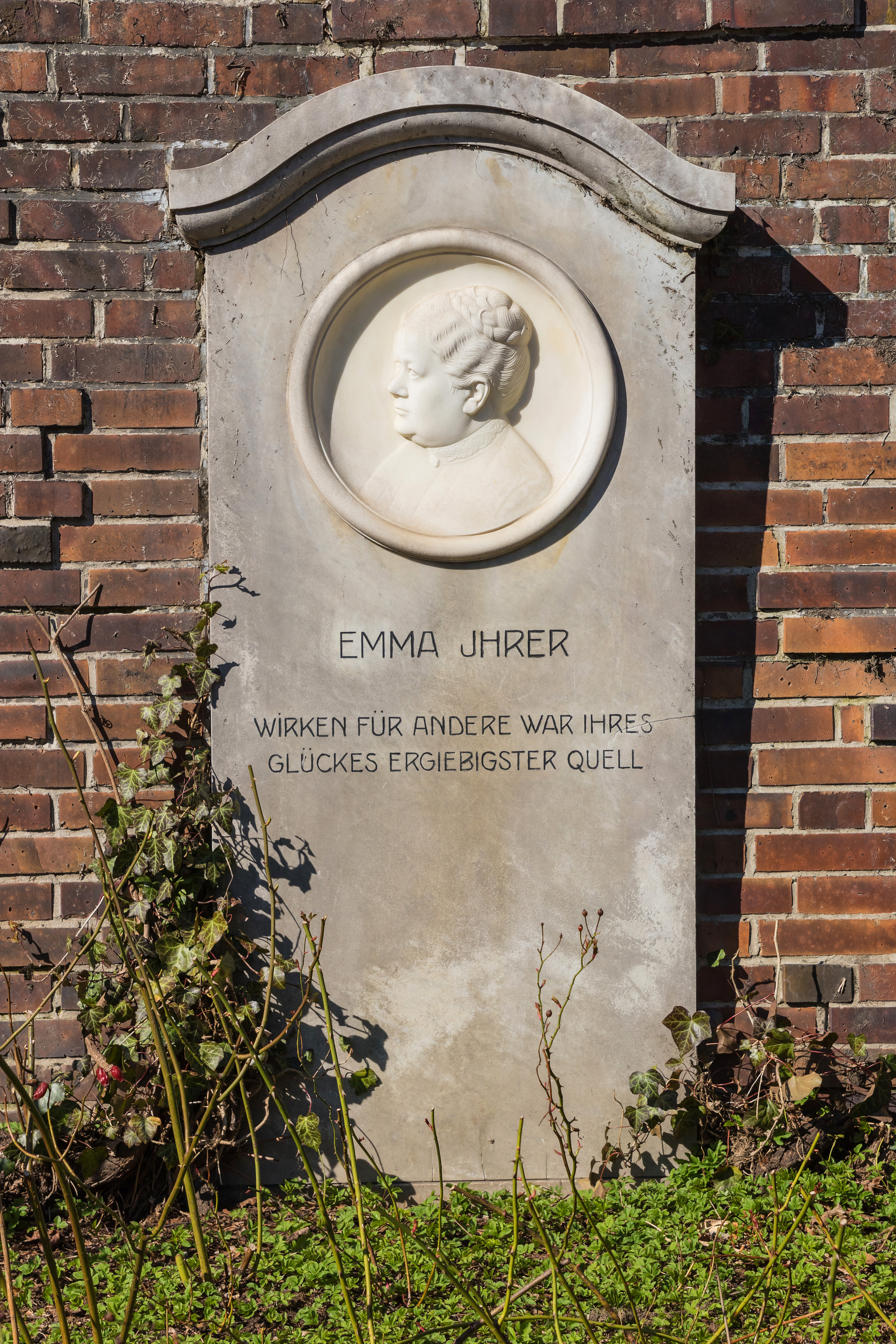
Emma Ihrer's grave on the Zentralfriedhof Friedrichsfelde in Berlin

Emma Ihrer died on 8 January 1911 in Berlin. Her grave is located in Berlin-Lichtenberg in the Friedrichsfelde Central Cemetery (Memorial of Socialists), Gudrunstraße. The Emma-Ihrer-Straße ("Emma Ihrer Street") in Berlin and Velten was named after her. The German postal service issued a stamp depicting her.

== Views ==
The first German pacifist association was founded by Julius Rupp of the Königsberg Free Congregation in 1850. Emma Ihrer was active in the Free Religious Congregation in the 1870s and 1880s, as were other founders of early socialist women's organization in Berlin such as Ottilie Baader and Agnes Wabnitz. Towards the end of 1892 Ihrer publicly declared that in a war the proletariat would suffer far more than the sons of the bourgeoisie.

Ihrer did not agree with Zetkin's hard line of non-cooperation with bourgeois feminists. She supported Lily Braun in 1897 when she proposed a rival reformist SPD women's organization that would cooperate with the bourgeois organizations in the struggle for women's suffrage. Gertrud David, Helma Steinbach, Henriette Fürth and other socialist feminist leaders also supported Braun's position.

In 1905 the SPD Reichstag deputy Edmund Fischer wrote an article in which he stated that employment of women in factories was "socially unhealthy, harmful ... an ill of capitalism that will disappear when capitalism is abolished." Ihrer attacked the article, strongly disagreeing with Fischer's characterization of women as primarily wives and mothers. She wrote, "Motherhood is just as little a life goal as fatherhood is." In her view Fischer's ideal of a stable family life could be achieved not by "the woman's renunciation of her job and the devotion of her mental and physical energy to the household alone ... but rather the cooperation of all elements, including above all the man, especially in raising the children." She questioned why women should place value on duties such as housework that men despised.

According to Luise Zietz she had a strong character, with great strength of will combined with a dignified and affectionate nature. Clara Zetkin saw in her "the implacable hater of all prejudice, the ruthless advocate of full equality of the female sex, the courageous fighter against all enslaving powers".

== Recognition ==
Ihrer was depicted on a 5 pfennig postage stamp in 1989, as part of the Women in German history series.

== Bibliography ==
- Badia, Gilbert (1993). Clara Zetkin, féministe sans frontières (in French). Editions de l'Atelier. ISBN 978-2-7082-3008-8.
- Canning, Kathleen (2002). Languages of Labor and Gender: Female Factory Work in Germany, 1850-1914. University of Michigan Press. ISBN 0-472-08766-5.
- Evans, Richard J. (1990). Proletarians and Politics: Socialism, Protest and the Working Class in Germany Before the First World War. Palgrave Macmillan. ISBN 978-0-312-05652-0.
- Marik, Soma (2008). Reinterrogating the Classical Marxist Discourses of Revolutionary Democracy. Aakar Books. ISBN 978-81-89833-34-3.
- Müller, Karin (2007). "Emma Ihrer". SPD. Archived from the original on 2014-11-05.
- Mutert, Susanne (1996). "Femmes et syndicats en Bavière". Métiers, corporations, syndicalismes (in French). Presses Univ. du Mirail. ISBN 978-2-85816-289-5.
- Steenson, Gary P. (1981-07-15). Not One Man Not One Penny. University of Pittsburgh Pre. ISBN 978-0-8229-7424-6.
- von Gélieu, Claudia (2007). "Sie kannte nicht den Ehrgeiz, der an erster Stelle stehen will. Emma Ihrer (1857–1911) zum 150. Geburtstag". Jahrbuch für Forschungen zur Geschichte der Arbeiterbewegung (in German) (III). NDZ Neue Zeitungsverwaltung. ISSN 1610-093X.
- Weir, Todd H. (2014-04-21). Secularism and Religion in Nineteenth-Century Germany: The Rise of the Fourth Confession. Cambridge University Press. ISBN 978-1-107-04156-1.
- Zelfel, Alexandra (2004). Erziehen - die Politik von Frauen: Erziehungsdiskurse im Spiegel von Frauenzeitschriften im ausgehenden 19. Jahrhundert. Julius Klinkhardt. ISBN 978-3-7815-1358-7.
