= Elfriede Ryneck =

German politician (1872–1951)

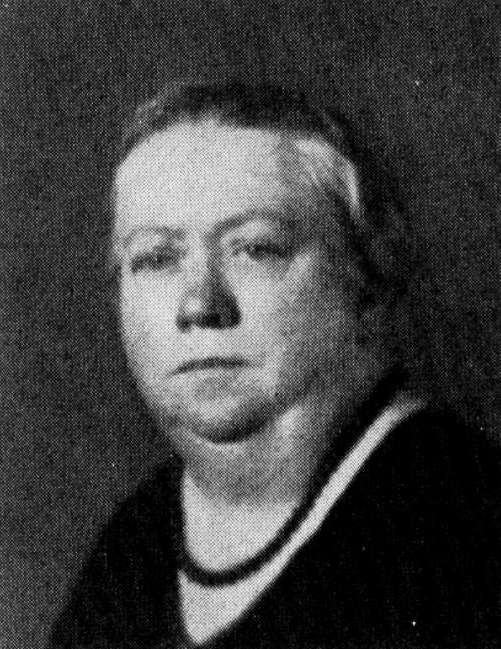
- Ryneck c. 1932

Member of the Reichstag
- In office 1920–1924
- Constituency: Potsdam II

Member of the Weimar National Assembly
- In office 1919–1920
- Constituency: Potsdam 10

Member of the Landtag of Prussia
- In office 1924–1933

Personal details
- Born: 14 December 1872 Berlin, Germany
- Died: 19 January 1951 (aged 78) East Berlin, East Germany

Elfriede Ryneck (14 December 1872 – 18 January 1951) was a German politician. In 1919, she was one of the 36 women elected to the Weimar National Assembly, the first female parliamentarians in Germany. She remained a member of parliament until 1924 and was then a member of the Landtag of Prussia until 1933.

== Biography ==
Ryneck was born in Berlin in 14 December 1872, the daughter of a bricklayer and the well-known social democrat and women's rights activist Pauline Staegemann. She attended Volksschule (elementary school) in Berlin between 1879 and 1886, after which she was educated at an advanced training school and a workers' training school. She subsequently worked as a seamstress until marrying proofreader Emil Ryneck in 1898. The couple had one son, Erich Ryneck, who was the father of Jutta Limbach, the first female member of the Federal Constitutional Court.

Having joined the Social Democratic Party (SPD) in 1890, Ryneck became a representative of the SPD Women in the district executive of the SPD electoral association for Teltow-Beestow in 1912. In 1919, she was one of the first women elected to the SPD party executive, and in the same year was elected to the Weimar National Assembly as a representative of the SPD. She was re-elected in the 1920 Reichstag elections, remaining a member of parliament until 1924.

Later in 1924, she was elected to the Landtag of Prussia. She was re-elected in 1928 and 1932, remaining a member until 1933. She chaired the Social Policy Committee from 1930 to 1933. After the Nazis came to power, Ryneck and her husband lost their jobs and withdrew from public life, relying on money from their son.

After World War II she was involved in the re-establishment of the SPD in Berlin. Living in an area that became part of East Berlin, she was among the party officials that approved the merger of the SPD and the Communist Party to form the Socialist Unity Party. She died in Treptow on 19 January 1951, aged 78.
