= Women in German history series =

Women in German history (Frauen der deutschen Geschichte) is a definitive stamp series issued in the Federal Republic of Germany (FRG) and West Berlin from 1986 to 1990, and in reunited Germany 1990 to 2003. The series was replaced by the current definitive series Blumen (flowers) from 3 January 2005.

== Description ==
The stamps were designed by Gerd and Oliver Aretz.

Each stamp represents a portrait of a famous German woman. Two are Austrian: Lise Meitner and Bertha von Suttner. The color of the portrait is different from the color of the country name and denomination.

The name of the country on the stamps changed according to German history :

- "Deutsche Bundespost" (Federal German Post), 1986–1990 in Western Germany and 1990–1995 in reunited Germany,
- "Deutsche Bundespost – Berlin", 1986–1990 for a use in West Berlin,
- "Deutschland" (Germany) since 1995.

The currency of the denomination changed too with the introduction of the euro:

- 1986 to 2000, expressed in pfennig and without a unit. For example: "100" for 100 pfennig (or 1 deutsche Mark).
- in 2000 and 2001, the denomination is in pfennig and in euro (with use of € symbol).
- since 2002, only euro is used with the € symbol.

Even if it was a definitive stamp series, because of the Reunification of Germany some issues for Westberlin were used only a short time and stamps with postmarks from real post services (not the collectors postmarks like most of Berlin 12) are rare.

== List of the stamps ==
=== Women in German history (FRG and West Berlin) ===
Denomination in Pfennig	Woman	Michel catalog 2nd line for West Berlin	Date of issue	Known as
5	Emma Ihrer	1405; 833	9 February 1989	trade unionist
10	Paula Modersohn-Becker	1359; 806	14 April 1988	painter
20	Cilly Aussem	1365; 811	5 May 1988	tennis player
40	Maria Sibylla Merian	1331; 788	17 September 1987	painter
50	Christine Teusch	1304; 770	13 November 1986	politician
60	Dorothea Erxleben	1332; 824	17 September 1987; Berlin: 10 November 1988	first woman doctor in Germany
80	Clara Schumann	1305; 771	13 November 1986	pianist and composer
100	Therese Giehse	1390; 825	10 November 1988	actress
120	Elisabeth Selbert	1338 –	6 November 1987	influential on West German constitution
130	Lise Meitner	1366; 812	5 May 1988	physicist
140	Cécile Vogt	1432; 848	10 August 1989	neuropathologist
170	Hannah Arendt	1391; 826	10 November 1988	philosopher, author
180	Lotte Lehmann	1427; 844	13 July 1989	singer
240	Mathilde Franziska Anneke	1392; 827	10 November 1988	feminist writer
250	Luise von Preußen	1428; 845	13 July 1989	queen of Prussia
300	Fanny Hensel née Mendelssohn	1433; 849	10 August 1989	composer
350	Hedwig Dransfeld	1393; 828	10 November 1988	politician
500	Alice Salomon	1397; 830	12 January 1989	feminist activist

=== Women in German history (after German reunification) ===
Denomination in Pfennig	Woman	Michel catalog	Date of issue	Known as
30	Käthe Kollwitz	1488	8 January 1991	artist
70	Elisabet Boehm	1489	8 January 1991	feminist organizer
80	Rahel Varnhagen von Ense	1755	13 October 1994	author
100	Luise Henriette von Oranien	1756	13 October 1994	princess of Brandenburg
150	Sophie Scholl	1497	14 February 1991	resistance activist
200	Bertha von Suttner	1498	14 February 1991	pacifist and writer
400	Charlotte von Stein	1582	9 January 1992	literary
450	Hedwig Courths-Mahler	1614	11 June 1992	writer
Country name: Deutschland
100	Elisabeth Schwarzhaupt	1955	16 October 1997	government minister
110	Marlene Dietrich	1939	14 August 1997	actress
220	Marie Elisabeth Lüders	1940	28 August 1997	member of parliament
300	Maria Probst	1956	16 October 1997	politician
440	Gret Palucca	2014	8 October 1998	ballerina

=== Women in German history (in euro) ===
Denomination in Pfennig and euro	Woman	Michel catalog	Date of issue	Known as
Denomination in Pfennig and euro
100 / 0,51 €	Grethe Weiser	2149	9 November 2000	actress
110 / 0,56 €	Käte Strobel	2150	9 November 2000	government minister
220 / 1,12 €	Marieluise Fleißer	2158	11 January 2001	writer
300 / 1,53 €	Nelly Sachs	2159	11 January 2001	Nobel Prize–winning author
Denomination in euro only
0,45 €	Annette von Droste-Hülshoff	2295	27 December 2002	poet
0,55 €	Hildegard Knef	2296	27 December 2002	actress, singer, and writer
1,00 €	Marie Juchacz	2305	16 January 2003	political activist
1,44 €	Esther von Kirchbach	2297	27 December 2002	writer
