= Gerd Aretz =

German artist

Gerd Aretz (18 February 1930 – 5 July 2009) was a German artist. From 1960 until his death he designed postage stamp for the Deutsche Bundespost including the Women in German history series portraits.

Born in Wuppertal, North Rhine-Westphalia, he used to teach art in the local university. In 1982, the "presidential souvenir sheet" designed by Aretz appeared, featuring the German presidents Theodor Heuss, Heinrich Lübke, Gustav Heinemann, Walter Scheel and Karl Carstens. Their successors Richard von Weizsäcker, Roman Herzog and Johannes Rau had refused to appear on stamps during their lifetimes. After Rau's death, the Federal Ministry of Finance issued an urgent order to submit a design for a commemorative stamp within 72 hours; together with his son, Aretz succeeded in fulfilling this order on time. In the same year, he also designed the stamp for Stamp Day. Among other things, it shows a letter holder with letters addressed to him, franked with stamps designed by him.

His son, Oliver Aretz, is a designer in Berlin and has worked with him on some stamps.
