= Oderberg =

- Town
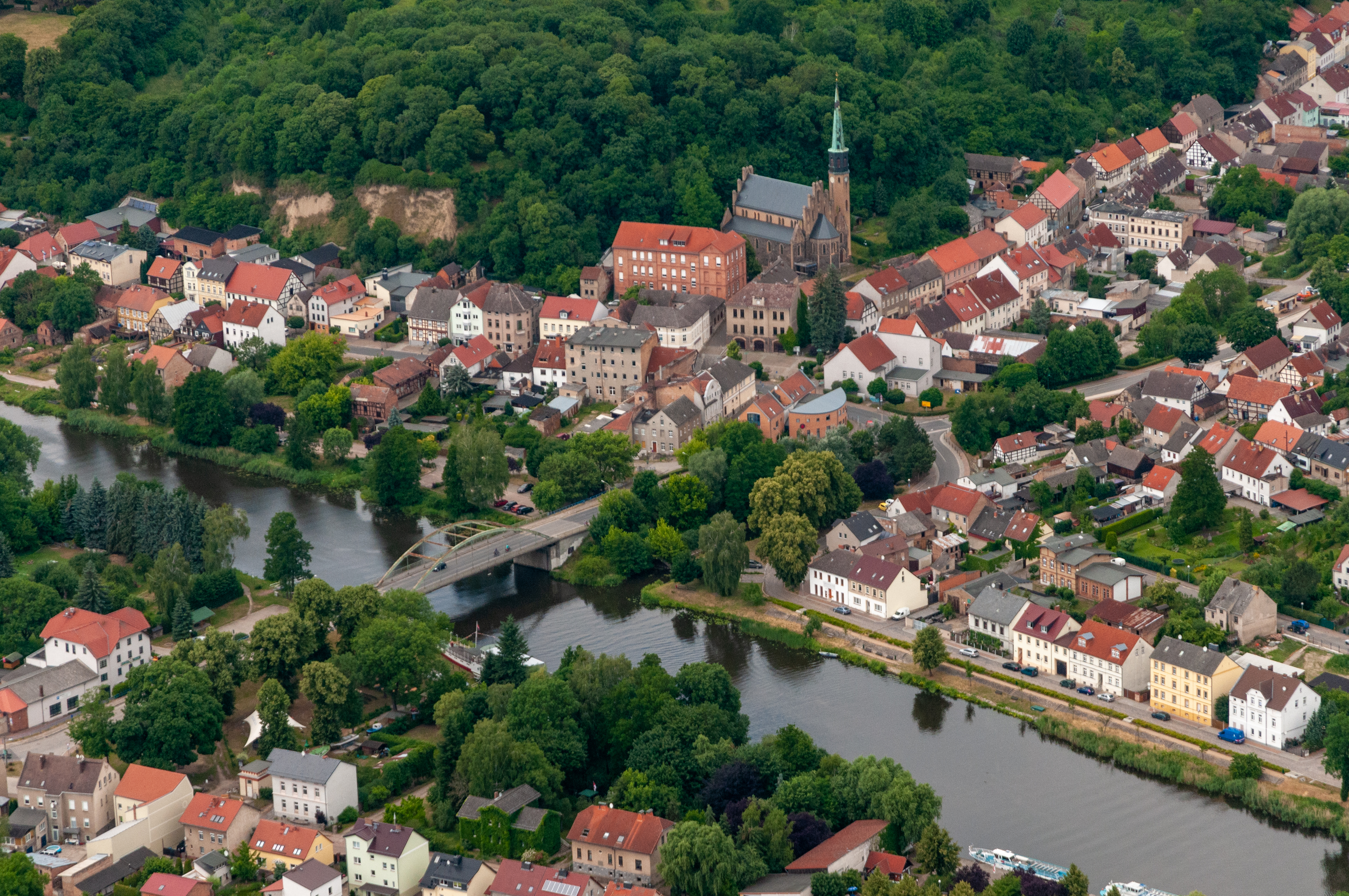
- Aerial view of the town center

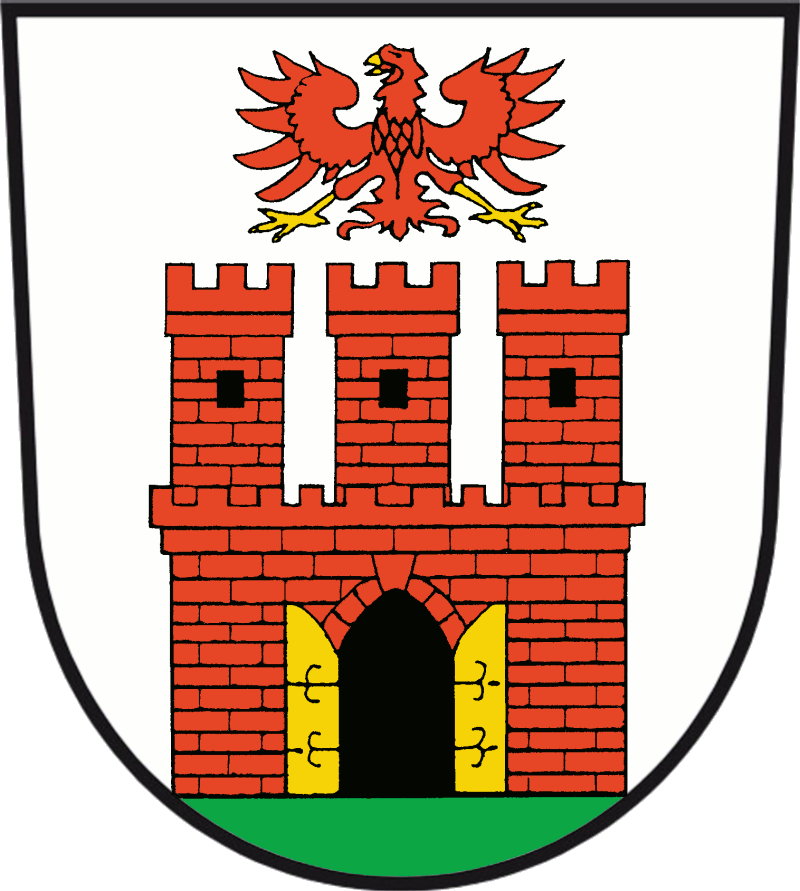
- Coat of arms

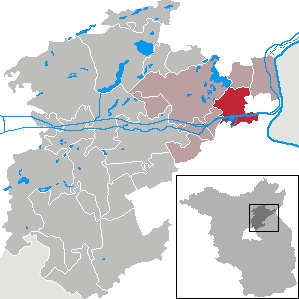
- Location of Oderberg within Barnim district
- Interactive map of Oderberg
- Location within Germany Location within Brandenburg
- Coordinates: 52°52′00″N 14°03′00″E
- Country: Germany
- State: Brandenburg
- District: Barnim
- Municipal assoc.: Britz-Chorin-Oderberg

Government
  - Mayor (2024–29): Martina Hähnel

Area
  - Total: 36.12 km^{2} (13.95 sq mi)
- Elevation: 5 m (16 ft)

Population (2025-12-31)
  - Total: 1,948
  - Density: 53.93/km^{2} (139.7/sq mi)
- Time zone: UTC+01:00 (CET)
  - Summer (DST): UTC+02:00 (CEST)
- Postal codes: 16248
- Dialling codes: 033369
- Vehicle registration: BAR
- Website: www.amt-oderberg.de

Oderberg (German: [ˈoːdɐbɛʁk]) is a town in the district of Barnim, in Brandenburg in northeastern Germany. It is situated 16 km east of Eberswalde, and 27 km southwest of Schwedt, close to the border with Poland, and in close vicinity of Berlin.

== Overview ==
The territory has many lakes, remnants from the ice age. The area is widely used for outdoor recreation, such as biking, walking and boating. As Biosphere region it is home to many species of wildlife. Oderberg is closest to the Oder river crossing leading directly to Cedynia, Poland.

== History ==
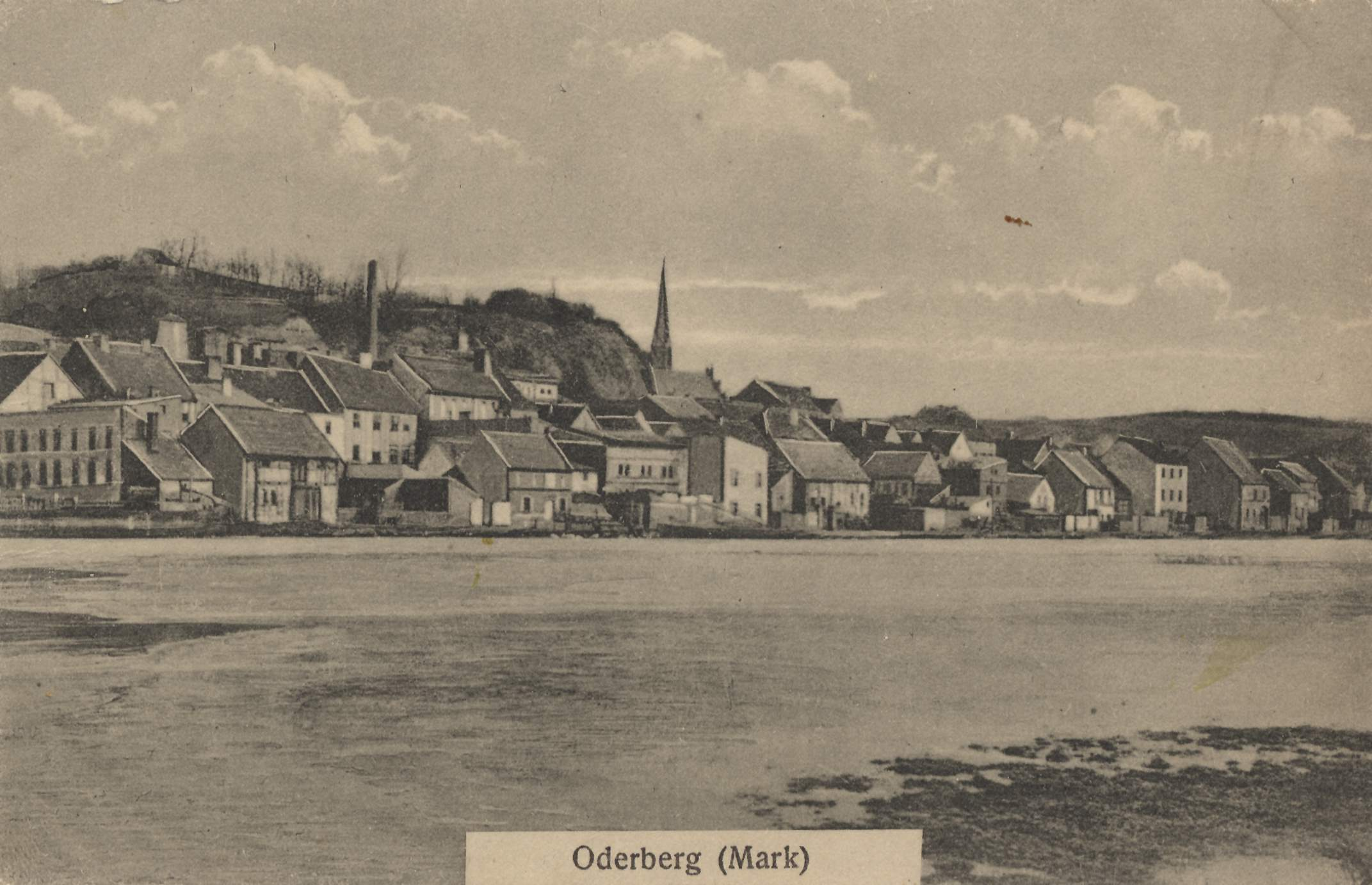
Postcard from ca. 1900

A Slavic tribal territory in the early medieval period, it was conquered by Henry the Fowler in c. 929–934. The Slavs regained independence from the Saxons during the Slavic revolt of 983. Afterwards the area was conquered by Polish rulers Bolesław I the Brave and Bolesław III Wrymouth.

In 1319, the town was captured by Henry II, Lord of Mecklenburg. In 1320, it was captured by the Duchy of Pomerania, however, it was eventually lost by Pomerania in September 1321. Afterwards it passed to the Margraviate of Brandenburg, and from 1373 to 1415 it was part of the Bohemian (Czech) Crown.

From 1701, Oderberg was part of the Kingdom of Prussia, and from 1871 also the German Empire. From 1815 to 1947, it was administratively located in the Province of Brandenburg. During World War II, there were three forced labour subcamps of the Stalag III-C prisoner-of-war camp in the town. After World War II, it was part of East Germany until 1990, administratively located within the State of Brandenburg from 1947 to 1952, Bezirk Frankfurt from 1952 to 1990 and since 1990 again of Brandenburg.

== Demography ==
Development of population since 1875 within the current boundaries (Blue line: Population; Dotted line: Comparison to population development of Brandenburg state; Grey background: Time of Nazi rule; Red background: Time of communist rule)

Oderberg: Population development
within the current boundaries (2020)

Year	Pop.	±% p.a.
1875	4,200	—
1890	4,466	+0.41%
1910	3,924	−0.64%
1925	3,398	−0.95%
1933	3,418	+0.07%
1939	3,710	+1.38%
1946	3,974	+0.99%
1950	4,424	+2.72%
1964	4,101	−0.54%
1971	3,977	−0.44%
1981	3,323	−1.78%
1985	3,147	−1.35%
1989	3,123	−0.19%
1990	3,078	−1.44%
1991	3,010	−2.21%

Year	Pop.	±% p.a.
1992	2,928	−2.72%
1993	2,897	−1.06%
1994	2,898	+0.03%
1995	2,884	−0.48%
1996	2,880	−0.14%
1997	2,822	−2.01%
1998	2,798	−0.85%
1999	2,760	−1.36%
2000	2,738	−0.80%
2001	2,647	−3.32%
2002	2,632	−0.57%
2003	2,589	−1.63%
2004	2,552	−1.43%
2005	2,491	−2.39%
2006	2,410	−3.25%

Year	Pop.	±% p.a.
2007	2,348	−2.57%
2008	2,267	−3.45%
2009	2,229	−1.68%
2010	2,160	−3.10%
2011	2,190	+1.39%
2012	2,172	−0.82%
2013	2,143	−1.34%
2014	2,165	+1.03%
2015	2,199	+1.57%
2016	2,185	−0.64%
2017	2,171	−0.64%
2018	2,166	−0.23%
2019	2,170	+0.18%
2020	2,134	−1.66%

== Gallery ==
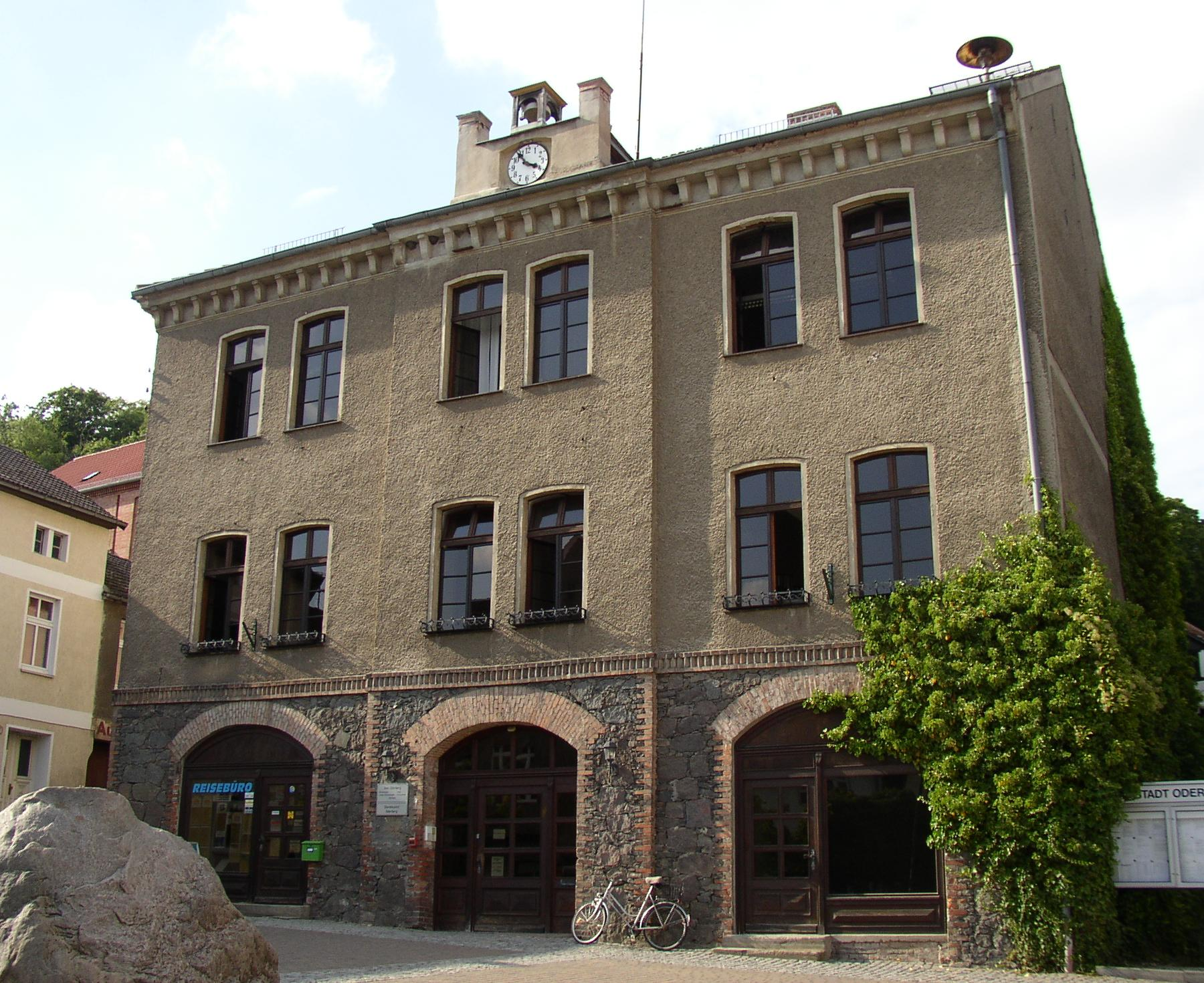
Town hall

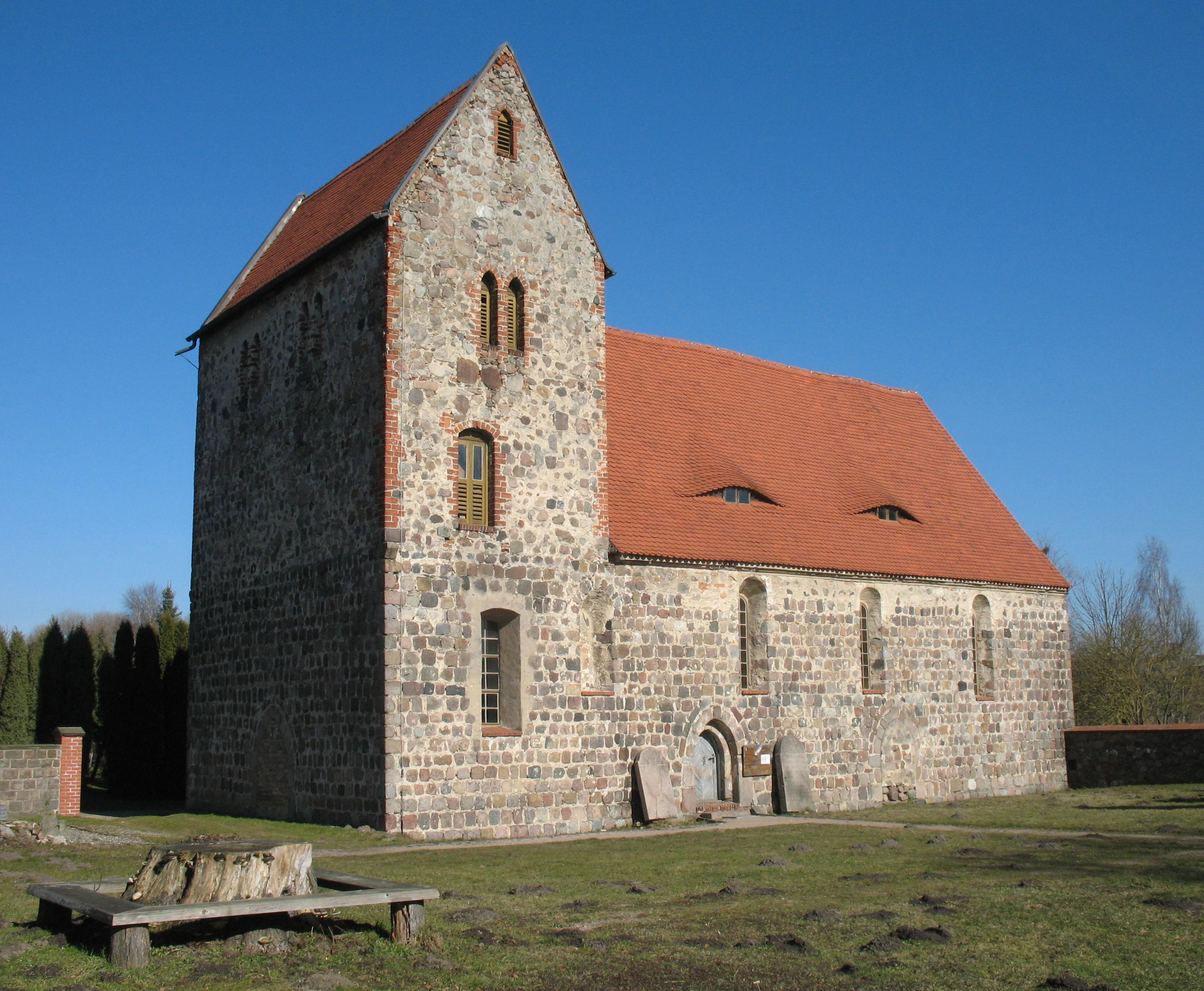
Church in Neuendorf

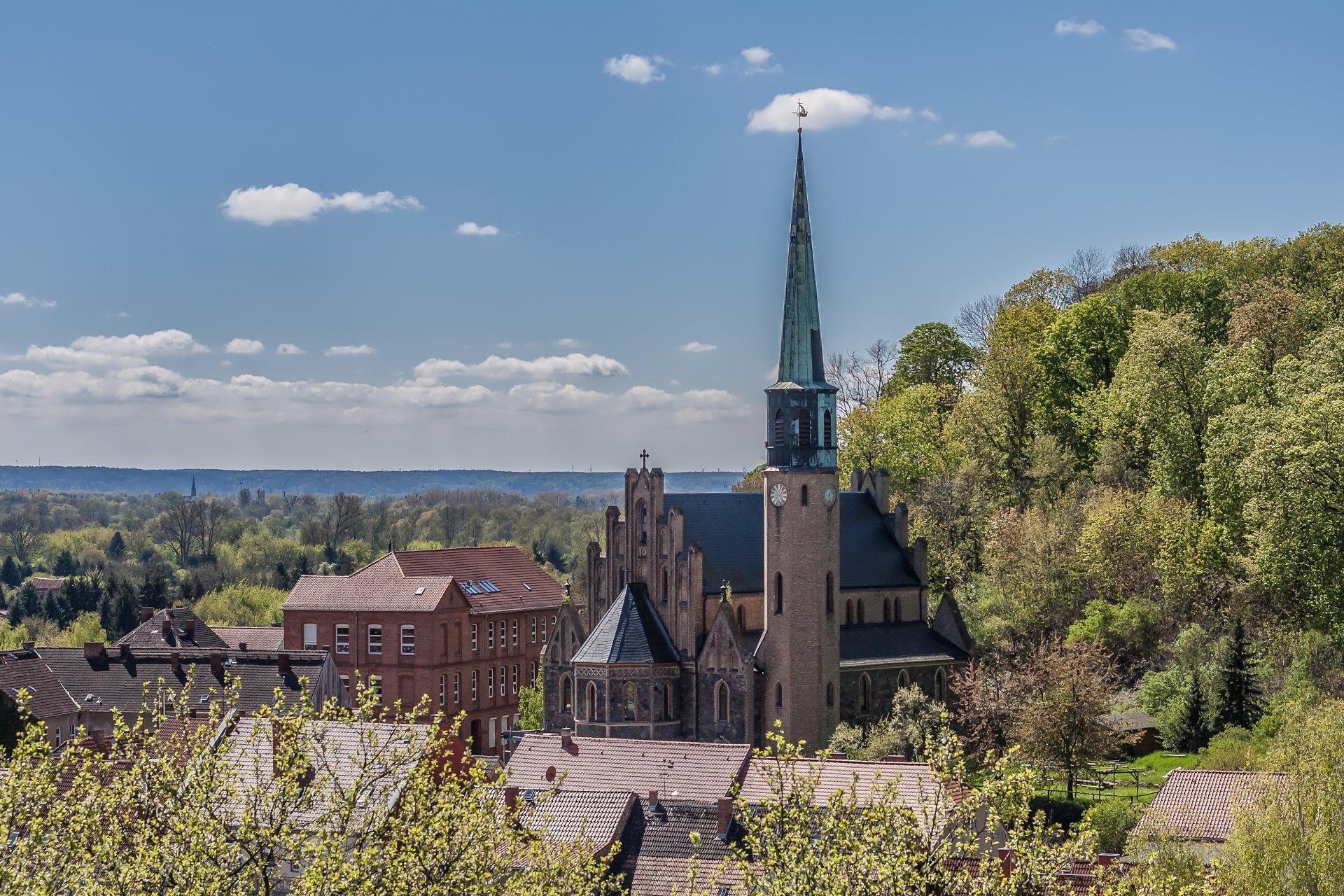
Saint Nicholas Church

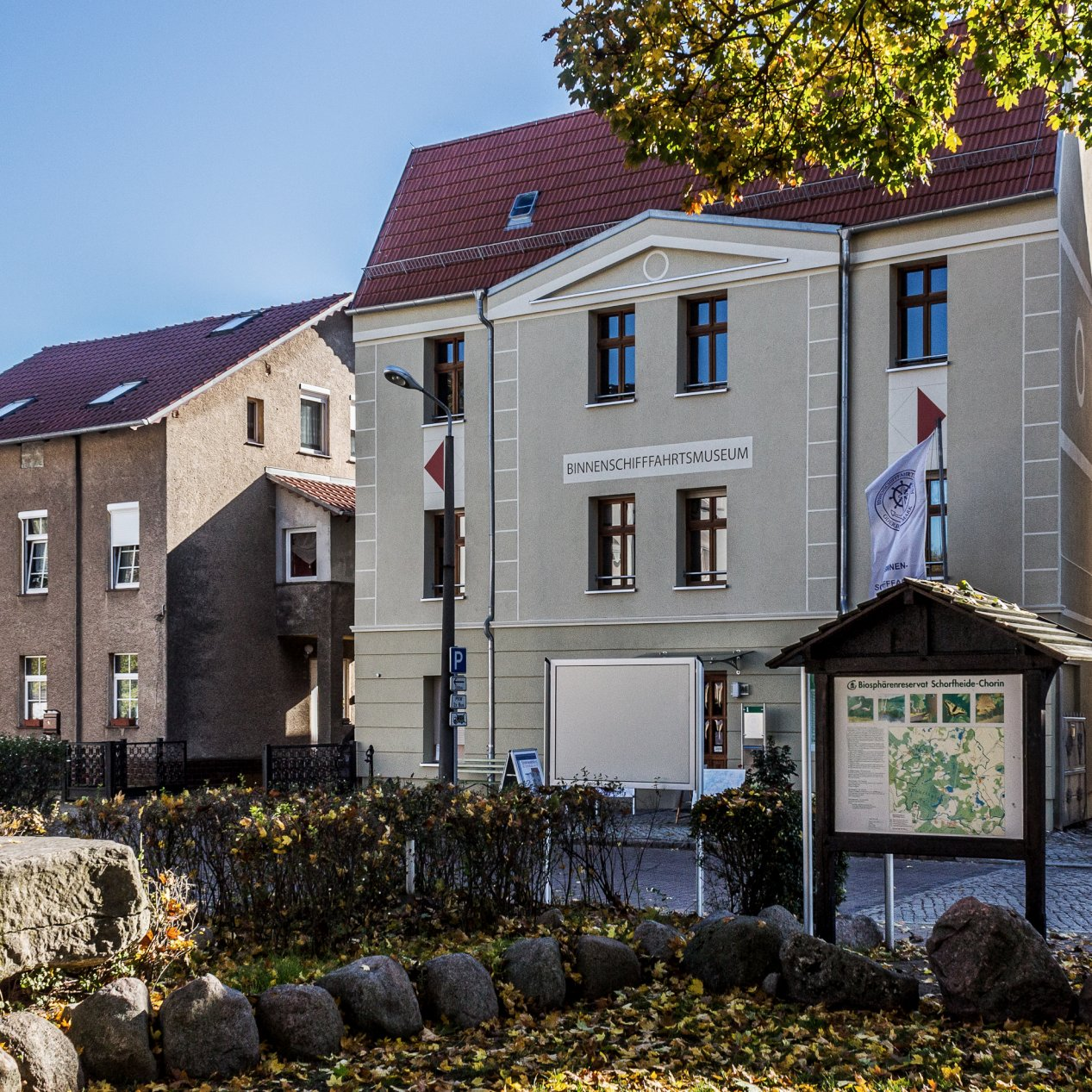
Museum

== Notable people ==
- Pauline Staegemann (1838–1909), socialist, feminist and trade unionist.
