= Jutta Limbach =

German judge and politician (1934–2016)

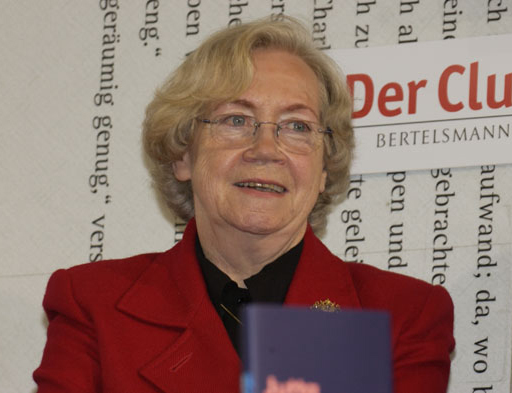
- Limbach in 2003

President of the Federal Constitutional Court of Germany
- In office 14 September 1994 – 10 April 2002
- Vice-President: Johann Friedrich Henschel; Otto Seidl; Hans-Jürgen Papier
- Nominated by: SPD
- Appointed by: Bundestag
- Preceded by: Roman Herzog
- Succeeded by: Hans-Jürgen Papier

Vice-President of the Federal Constitutional Court of Germany
- In office 24 March 1994 – 14 September 1994
- President: Roman Herzog
- Nominated by: SPD
- Appointed by: Bundestag
- Preceded by: Ernst Mahrenholz
- Succeeded by: Johann Friedrich Henschel

Judge of the Federal Constitutional Court of Germany for the Second Senate
- In office 24 March 1994 – 10 April 2002
- Nominated by: SPD
- Appointed by: Bundestag
- Preceded by: Ernst Gottfried Mahrenholz
- Succeeded by: Gertrude Lübbe-Wolff

Senator for Justice of Berlin
- In office 16 March 1989 – 24 March 1994
- Governing Mayor: Walter Momper; Eberhard Diepgen
- Preceded by: Rupert Scholz
- Succeeded by: Lore Maria Peschel-Gutzeit

Personal details
- Born: Jutta Ryneck; 27 March 1934 Berlin-Neukölln, Berlin, Nazi Germany (now Germany)
- Died: 10 September 2016 (aged 82) Berlin, Germany
- Party: Social Democratic Party
- Children: Benjamin Limbach
- Education: Free University of Berlin
- Occupation: Politician; Judge; Academic

Jutta Limbach (27 March 1934 – 10 September 2016) was a German jurist and politician. She was a member of the Social Democratic Party of Germany (SPD) and served as President of the Federal Constitutional Court of Germany from 1994 to 2002, the first woman in this office.

== Early life and education ==
Born as Jutta Ryneck, Limbach grew up in Berlin. Her grandmother Elfriede Ryneck was a member of the Weimar National Assembly and the Reichstag, and her father Ernst Ryneck served as mayor of Pankow after 1945. Her great-grandmother Pauline Staegemann lead the Prussian women's organisations Berlin Workers' Wives' and Girls' Association and the Association for the Protection of Female Workers' Interests.

Limbach studied law in Berlin and Freiburg. She passed the first and the second state law examination in 1958 and 1962. From 1963 to 1966 she worked as a research assistant at the law school of the Free University of Berlin and received her doctorate in law in 1966, with a thesis in legal sociology.

== Career ==
Limbach fulfilled the requirements to be appointed professor by the German educational system in 1971. In 1972, she was appointed professor for civil law, commercial law and legal sociology at the Free University. From 1987 to 1989, she was member of an academic advisory council at the Federal Ministry for Family Affairs, Senior Citizens, Women and Youth.

Under Walter Momper as mayor, Limbach was the senator for Justice in Berlin from 1989 to 1994. During her time in office, German prosecutors issued a warrant for the arrest of Erich Honecker after discovering written orders by the former East German leader for guards at the Berlin wall to shoot to kill people who were seeking to flee the country.

=== Judge at the Federal Constitutional Court of Germany ===
In 1994, Limbach was appointed to the position of vice-president of the Federal Constitutional Court of Germany, the same year she became president, succeeding Roman Herzog. She was the first female president of the court and served in this role until she reached the age limit of 68 in 2002. During her leadership, the 2nd Senate of the Court issued numerous important rulings, including decisions on the criminal prosecution of former Stasi spies (BVerfGE 92, 277), on Germany's accession to the Economic and Monetary Union of the European Union (BVerfGE 97, 350) and on the German system of equalization payments (BVerfGE 101, 158).

=== Later role ===
Limbach then became president of the German non-profit organization Goethe-Institut. In 2004, she was repeatedly named as a possible candidate to succeed Johannes Rau as President of Germany in that year's election. Limbach was a member of the committee of the Peace Prize of the German Book Trade.

In 2005 and 2006 Limbach was a member of the Group of Wise Persons who was tasked by the Council of Europe to develop strategies how to manage the workload of the European Court of Human Rights. In 2007, she was a member of the Group of Intellectuals for Intercultural Dialogue set up at the initiative of the European Commission.

In 2010, Limbach in an interview proposed that liberal human rights activist Sabine Leutheusser-Schnarrenberger be made a judge at the court, praising her "intellectual honesty"; instead, Andreas Voßkuhle was nominated by the SPD.

In 2013 Limbach was awarded the Mercator Visiting Professorship for Political Management at the University of Duisburg-Essen's NRW School of Governance. During the winter semester of 2014 she gave both lectures and seminars at the university.

== Limbach Commission on Nazi art ==
From 2003, Limbach headed the so-called Limbach Commission (Advisory Commission on the return of cultural property seized as a result of Nazi persecution, especially Jewish property), a panel convened by the German government to give recommendations on restitution claims regarding art works stolen or purchased under duress by the Nazis; the panel's decisions are not legally binding but are intended as a form of mediation in disputes over provenance. The eight members of the commission are charged by Germany's federal, state and local governments with helping to return art looted by the Nazis to its rightful owners gathered for the first time. By 2014, the Limbach Commission had been called upon to advise on about a dozen restitution cases.

== Awards and recognitions ==
Limbach held honorary degrees from the Masaryk University (1997), University of Basel (1999), Erasmus University Rotterdam (2002), University College London (2002), York University (2003) and University of Bremen (2008). In 1999, she was named Honorary Bencher of the Gray's Inn. She has also received numerous awards, including the Grand Decoration of Honour in Gold of the Republic of Austria (1998) and the Louise-Schroeder-Medal (2005).

== Personal life ==
Limbach died on 10 September 2016, aged 82, in Berlin.

Educational offices
Preceded by Hilmar Hoffmann	President of the Goethe-Institut; 2001–2008	Succeeded by Klaus-Dieter Lehmann
