= Dorothea Erxleben =

German physician (1715–1762)

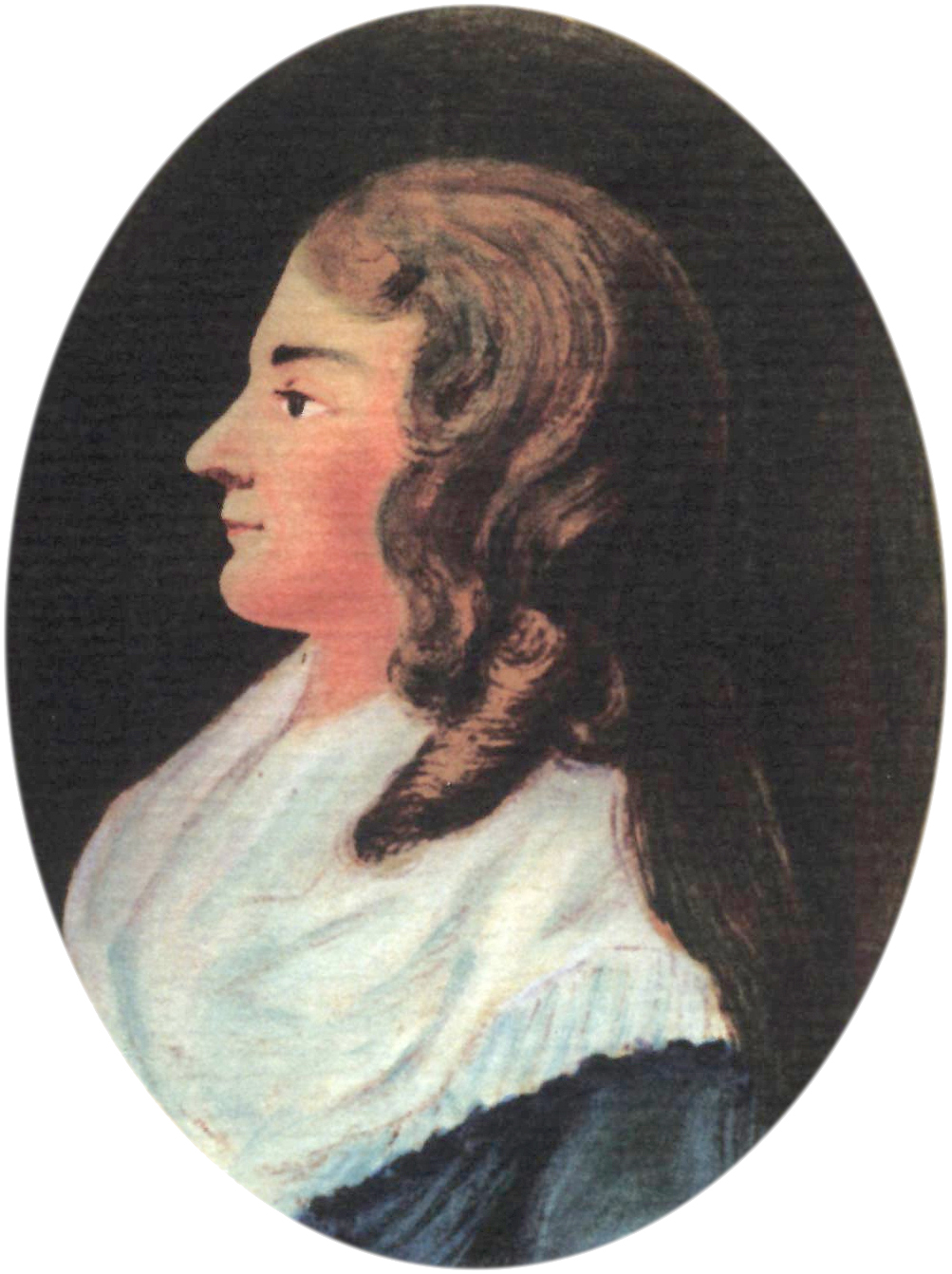
- Born: Dorothea Christiane Leporin; 13 November 1715; Quedlinburg, Kingdom of Prussia, Holy Roman Empire
- Died: 13 June 1762 (aged 46); Quedlinburg, Kingdom of Prussia, Holy Roman Empire
- Education: University of Halle
- Scientific career
- Fields: Medicine

Dorothea Christiane Erxleben (13 November 1715 – 13 June 1762) was a German medical doctor who became the first woman doctor of medicine in Germany.

Educated by her progressive physician father and rector of her school, she desired to attend medical school and study medicine like her brother. She eventually petitioned Frederick the Great of Prussia to allow her entry into the University of Halle. Despite a Royal permission to attend, Erxleben never entered University. When her cousin died, leaving five children, she decided in 1741, at the age of 26, to look after them, married widower Johann Christian Erxleben and went on to have four children with him.

In 1747, due to economic constraints, the mother of nine children began to practice medicine in Quedlinburg without a degree, and became highly respected by the towns people. However, local physicians who felt their monopoly on medical services was threatened filed a lawsuit, charging her with medical quackery. In January 1754, the king ruled that Erxleben would have to pass an examination and submit a dissertation at the University of Halle. Her inaugural dissertation was titled Concerning the Swift and Pleasant but for that Reason less than Full Cure of Illnesses, in which she argued against the prophylactic use of strong laxative, purgatives and perspiratory agents as it was practiced at that time. She pointed out that doctors were too quick to prescribe unnecessary cures like opiates for illnesses that did not require them and made suggestions regarding their correct usage and dosage, as well as best interventions to promote menstruation and urination. She spent another 8 years practicing medicine in her hometown of Quedlinburg until she died of breast cancer.

== Early life ==
Dorothea Erxleben was born Dorothea Christiane Polycarp Leporin on 13 November 1715, in the small town of Quedlinburg, Germany to the town's progressive doctor, physician Christian Polycarp Leporin Sr. and his wife Anna Sophia, née Meinecke Dorothea was very sickly as a child and thus was home schooled rather than in a classroom most of her childhood. Dorothea often spent her days as a child reading her father’s medical notes as a way to pass the time, and by four years old she was reading these papers with ease. Her father home schooled his children and noticed her excelling at her schoolwork early on in life, as well as her general brightness. He arranged for her to be tutored in Latin, math and the sciences alongside her brother Christian Polycarp Leporin Jr. When her brother began going to physical schooling in Quedlinburg, Dorothea was unable to follow him. Her father waited until she turned nine before requesting the headmaster of Christian’s school send Latin lessons home with the boy so Dorothea could learn lessons by correspondence. Dorothea would later get more assistance from another teacher at the school, Herr Prillwitz, with her history and French. Her father also introduced her to medical theory, and allowed Dorothea to visit patients alongside him. When asked about his daughter's studies, Christian Polycarp Leporin was noted as saying that gifted women's talents are being wasted in the kitchen. The Leporin family embraced the new ideas of the Age of Enlightenment, such as the values of Germany's Bürgertum, which led to Christian's belief that both of his children should receive the best education possible.

Later she attended the Gymnasium (Germany) where the rector gave her writings by Anna Maria van Schurman and Olympia Fulvia Morata. Through him she also heard that Laura Bassi, an Italian physicist and academic had become doctor of philosophy at the University of Bologna. Bassi was the first woman in the world to be a professor at a university.

Both siblings were introduced into medicine by their father. Her brother Christian planned to study medicine at the University of Halle, and his sister wanted to follow him.

She petitioned King Frederick the Great of Prussia to allow her entry into the University of Halle. Frederick the Great approved this request in April 1741.

== University application, admission and marriage ==
Erxleben's admission into university was both criticized and admired. Critics like Johann Rhetius, a pamphleteer, argued that women were by law forbidden to practice medicine and therefore earning a degree in such a field would be a waste of time. During her studies in university, Dorothea found the ideas of Pietism and philosophies of the medical kind through the studies of Georg Ernst Stahl, which eventually led to her works over medicine and women's education. Although Erxleben never publicly remarked on the controversy behind women's education, she began to write down her arguments and opinions on the topic, which were published in 1742 as a book titled A Thorough Inquiry into the Causes Preventing the Female Sex from Studying. Her protofeminist book argued for Germany to take advantage of the talents of half of its population, while her father wrote a foreword that described the need for reform in Germany's universities and how the admittance of women would spur this long-needed change. In this particular piece, she also admonishes the women who turn away from learning as it helps reinforce the perspective of men. It was common in her writing for her to support the idea of women taking their education into their own hands and break away from the preset traditions men had placed. She argued that women were held back by their home obligations but not incapable of learning just as men did so long as they put their minds to it. She also argued about the rational soul and the Enlightenment's push for new open-mindedness, saying that while the Enlightenment brought about the idea that the body was ruled by the spirit, it was also ruled by social experience and sensation.

Despite her University admission, Erxleben did not enter University immediately. Erxleben's brother and father were conscripted in 1740 to serve in the Silesian Wars. Erxleben was uncomfortable with the prospect of attending Halle alone. At the same time, she also had to take charge of her father's practice, as he was away due to the war. Instead of attending Halle, she remained at home. In 1742, at the age of 26, she married auxiliary priest Johann Christian Erxleben, the husband of her recently deceased cousin, who already had five children. Their marriage was a generally happy one, and she went on to have four children with Johann over the next few years. Despite being busy at home for years managing her nine children, she was able to continue her medical studies at a slower pace.

== Career ==
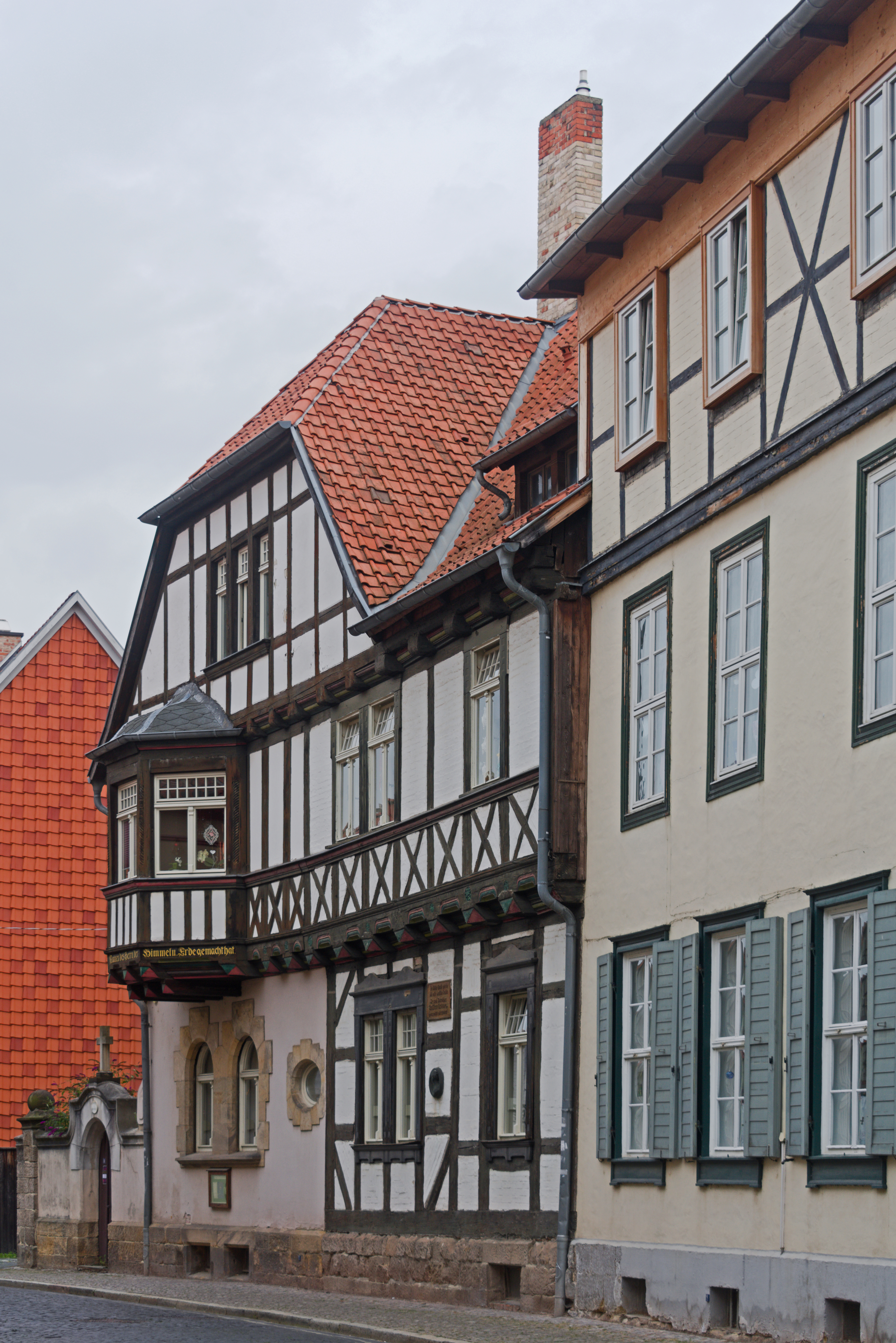
House in Quedlinburg where Dorothea Erxleben lived and worked

In 1747, her father died and her husband's health began to deteriorate, leaving the Leporin family with serious debts. To pay off these debts, Erxleben took over her father's practice in Quedlinburg. At this time, she still had not received her doctorate. Despite this, she still practiced medicine, and became highly respected by the town. During her 4th pregnancy in 1753 one of her patients died. This death led to three local physicians accusing Erxleben of medical quackery and called upon the government of Quedlinburg to put an end to the quackery, especially Erxleben's practice. The doctors, Johann Herweg, Henricus Grasshoff, and Andreas Zeitz, felt their monopoly on medicine was threatened, and felt that the "quackery" performed by Erxleben, such as allowing patients to address her with medical titles, diminished the image of the medical field. In response to the doctors' complaints of malpractice, a new ordinance was enacted that only allowed medical treatment from licensed doctors. As Erxleben did not have a degree and was not licensed to practice medicine, this new ordinance prevented her from practicing medicine.

After receiving the charges brought against her, Erxleben fought back against the claims, arguing that she was qualified to perform medical treatment, which came from the training given to her by her father. While she successfully defended herself from any criminal charges of malpractice, city officials informed Erxleben that she would still have to pass final exams at university to practice medicine. The case rose through the courts and was brought before Frederick the Great in January 1754. The king allowed Erxleben to take the final exams and submit a dissertation at the University of Halle, and with the support of the university's rector Johann Junker, she did just that in 1754. Her medical inaugural dissertation was titled Concerning the Swift and Pleasant but for that Reason less than Full Cure of Illnesses, in which she argued that doctors were too quick to prescribe unnecessary cures. She stated that doctors intervened too quickly to prescribe medicines like opiates for illnesses that did not require them and made several suggestions regarding the proper use of purgatives, best interventions to promote menstruation and urination, as well as the correct usage and dosage of opiates. Erxleben's dissertation quickly spread throughout Germany, particularly among women with health problems, and Erxleben even translated the dissertation from Latin into German to make it more accessible to the poor. On 12 June 1754, Dorothea Erxleben received her M.D. degree, becoming the first woman in Germany to do so.

She spent the next 8 years practicing medicine in her hometown of Quedlinburg and died of breast cancer on 13 June 1762.

== Legacy ==
For nearly 150 years, German medical history did not see another woman. Only in the early 20th century would women once again become admitted into German medical schools.

She is often considered a pioneer in this field for women and for her ideas about opiates and the proper use of medicines.

At the University of Halle Medical School a learning centre is named in her honor. Clinics and foundations have been named after her.

On 17 September 1987, the German Federal Post Office issued a 60 pfennig postage stamp for the purpose of honoring Dorothea as part of its stamp series "The Women of German History".

On 13 November 2015, Google celebrated her 300th birthday with a Google Doodle.
