= Benjamin Limbach =

German politician (born 1969)

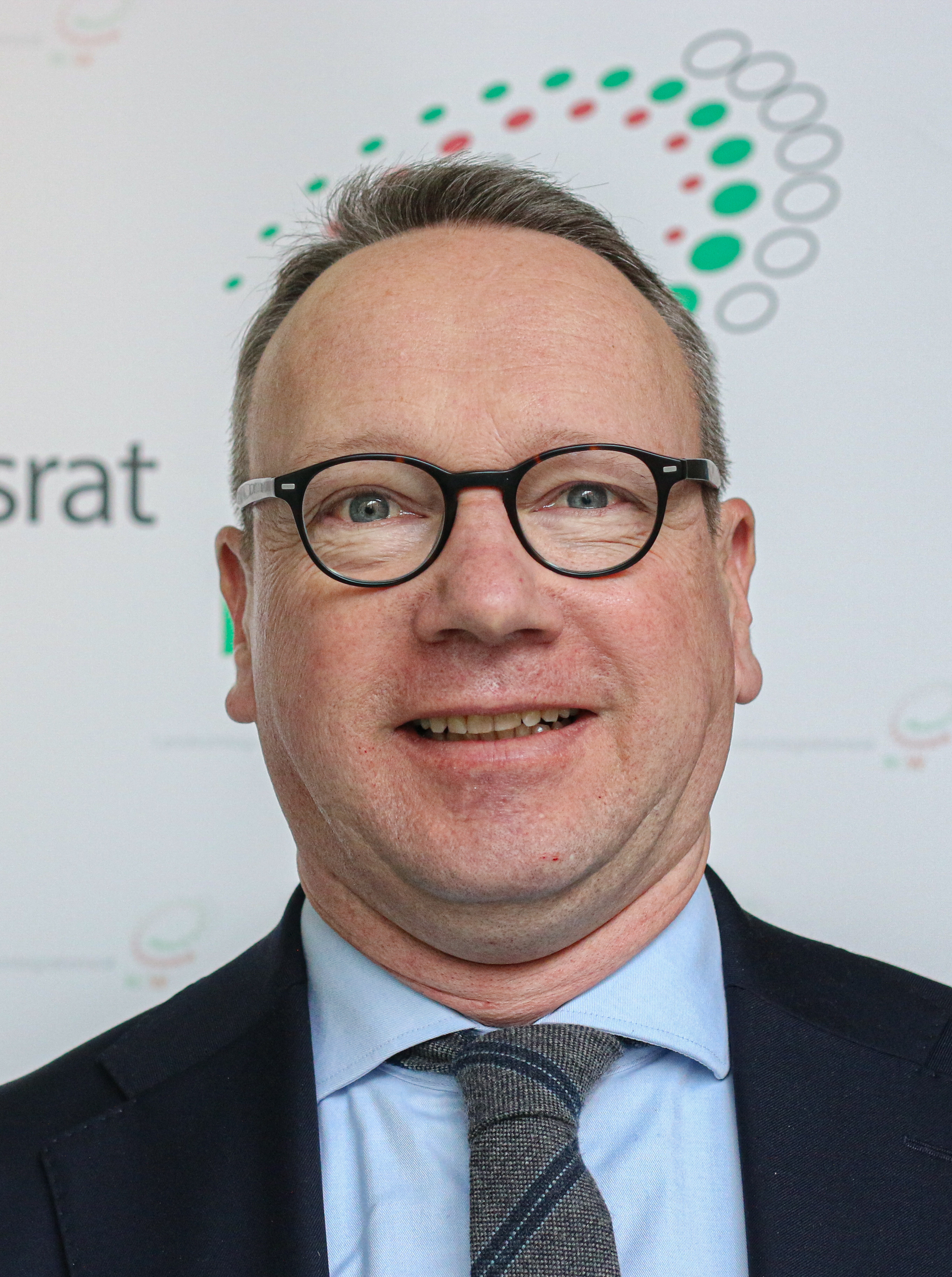
- Limbach in 2025

Minister of Justice of North Rhine-Westphalia
- Incumbent
- Assumed office 29 June 2022
- Minister-President: Hendrik Wüst
- Preceded by: Peter Biesenbach

Personal details
- Born: 25 September 1969 (age 56) Bonn
- Party: Alliance 90/The Greens (since 2018)
- Parent: Jutta Limbach (mother)

Benjamin Limbach (born 25 September 1969 in Bonn) is a German politician serving as minister of justice of North Rhine-Westphalia since 2022. From 2020 to 2022, he served as president of the Federal University of Applied Administrative Sciences. He is the son of Jutta Limbach.
