= Velten =

- Town
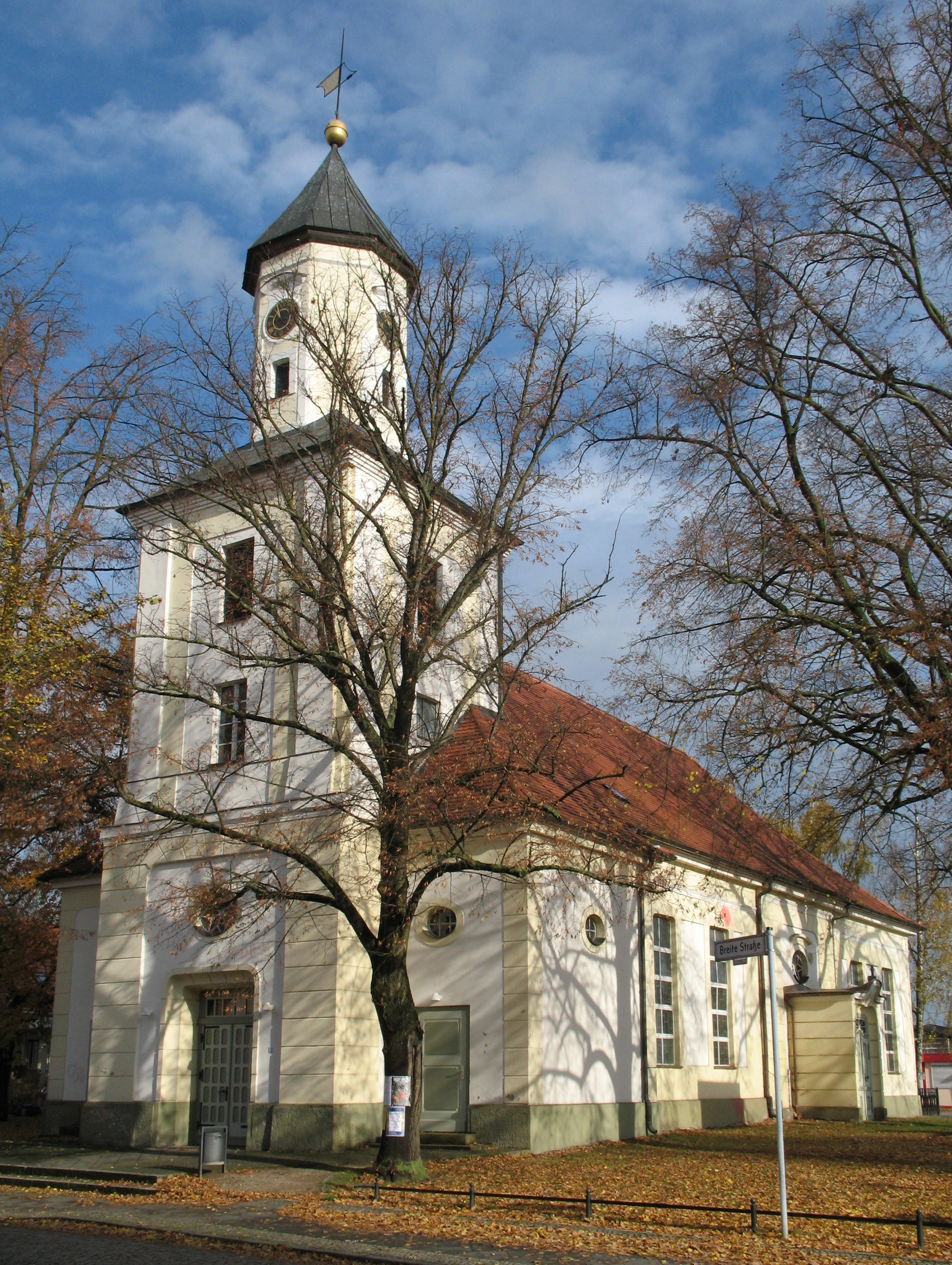

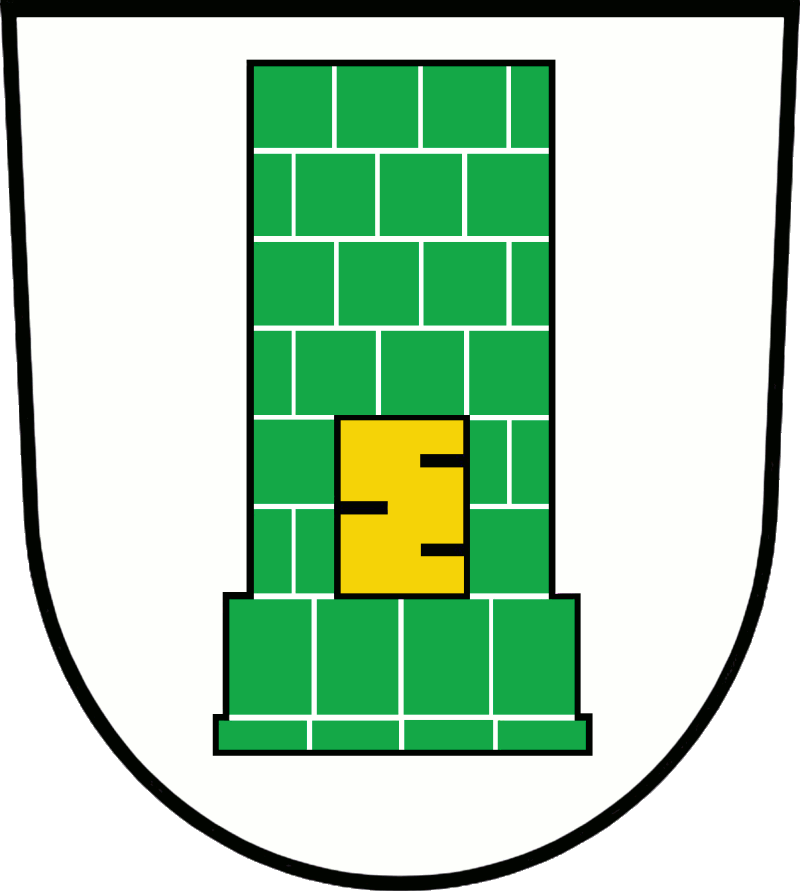
- Coat of arms

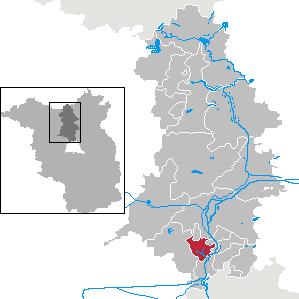
- Location of Velten within Oberhavel district
- Interactive map of Velten
- Location within Germany Location within Brandenburg
- Coordinates: 52°41′N 13°11′E
- Country: Germany
- State: Brandenburg
- District: Oberhavel

Government
  - Mayor (2017–25): Ines Hübner (SPD)

Area
  - Total: 23.36 km^{2} (9.02 sq mi)
- Elevation: 33 m (108 ft)

Population (2025-12-31)
  - Total: 12,674
  - Density: 542.6/km^{2} (1,405/sq mi)
- Time zone: UTC+01:00 (CET)
  - Summer (DST): UTC+02:00 (CEST)
- Postal codes: 16727
- Dialling codes: 03304
- Vehicle registration: OHV
- Website: www.Velten.de

Velten (German pronunciation: [ˈfɛltn̩]) is a town in the Oberhavel district of Brandenburg, Germany. It is situated 10 km southwest of Oranienburg, and 24 km northwest of Berlin.

== History ==
In 1905 Velten had 38 stove factories that delivered 100,000 tiled stoves to Berlin, making Velten Germany's biggest stove manufacturer.

== Demography ==
Development of Population since 1875 within the Current Boundaries (Blue Line: Population; Dotted Line: Comparison to Population Development of Brandenburg state; Grey background: Time of Nazi rule; Red background: Time of communist rule)

Recent Population Development and Projections (Population Development before Census 2011 (blue line); Recent Population Development according to the Census in Germany in 2011 (blue bordered line); Official projections for 2005-2030 (yellow line); for 2020-2030 (green line); for 2017-2030 (scarlet line)

Velten: Population development
within the current boundaries (2013)

Year	Pop.	±% p.a.
1875	2,712	—
1890	6,017	+5.46%
1910	7,483	+1.10%
1925	7,646	+0.14%
1933	7,974	+0.53%
1939	9,753	+3.41%
1946	10,301	+0.78%
1950	10,546	+0.59%
1964	9,826	−0.50%
1971	8,959	−1.31%
1981	7,967	−1.17%
1985	7,727	−0.76%
1989	10,848	+8.85%
1990	10,496	−3.24%
1991	10,455	−0.39%

Year	Pop.	±% p.a.
1992	10,385	−0.67%
1993	10,423	+0.37%
1994	10,624	+1.93%
1995	11,136	+4.82%
1996	11,820	+6.14%
1997	12,161	+2.88%
1998	12,013	−1.22%
1999	11,971	−0.35%
2000	12,118	+1.23%
2001	12,044	−0.61%
2002	11,930	−0.95%
2003	11,713	−1.82%
2004	11,475	−2.03%
2005	11,446	−0.25%
2006	11,419	−0.24%

Year	Pop.	±% p.a.
2007	11,502	+0.73%
2008	11,640	+1.20%
2009	11,789	+1.28%
2010	11,858	+0.59%
2011	11,527	−2.79%
2012	11,569	+0.36%
2013	11,569	+0.00%
2014	11,718	+1.29%
2015	11,766	+0.41%
2016	11,815	+0.42%
2017	11,838	+0.19%
2018	11,965	+1.07%
2019	12,179	+1.79%
2020	12,296	+0.96%

== Personality ==
- Erna Gersinski (1896–1964), resistance fighter against Nazism, lived in Velten.
- Martin Männel (born 1988), soccer goalkeeper, played between his eighth and fourteenth year at SC Oberhavel Velten.
- Emma Ihrer (1857–1911), trade unionist, lived from 1887 to 1894 in Velten
