= C. H. Beck =

German publisher

Verlag C. H. Beck
- Founded: 9 September 1763
- Founder: Carl Gottlob Beck
- Country of origin: Germany
- Publication types: Books, journals
- Imprints: Nomos
- Official website: beck.de

Verlag C. H. BECK oHG, established in 1763 by Carl Gottlob Beck, is one of Germany's oldest publishing houses. Historically, the company's headquarters were in Nördlingen. The initials of the founder's son and successor, Carl Heinrich Beck, survive in the company's current name.

It operates in two main divisions: Legal – Tax – Business (professional publishing) and Literature – Nonfiction – Science (trade publishing). It has an annual production of up to 1,500 titles including many electronic publications, about 70 professional journals and more than 9,000 titles in print. Its headquarters are in Munich, with a branch office in Frankfurt. Six hundred and fifty employees work in the Munich headquarters. The 120 scientific editors combined work at the Munich and Frankfurt offices, supporting over 14,000 authors. The Frankfurt office houses the editorial departments of most of C.H. Beck's publications in his own field and the editorial departments in the same department as his own publications law journals. Since 1999 the Nomos publishing house has belonged to the C.H. Beck group, which also has subsidiaries in Switzerland, Poland, the Czech Republic and Romania. As a group of publishing houses, in turnover C.H.Beck ranks among the 10 largest groups in Germany and the 50 largest worldwide.

== See also ==
- Books in Germany
