= Nomos Publishing =

German publisher

Nomos Publishiing
- Parent company: C.H. Beck
- Founded: 1964
- Country of origin: Germany
- Headquarters location: Baden-Baden
- Official website: www.nomos.de

Nomos Publishing (Nomos Verlagsgesellschaft in German) is an academic publisher focusing on law, the humanities, and social sciences. It is one of the prominent publishers of books and journals in those fields in German speaking world and is based in Baden-Baden. Nomos publishes over 60 journals which range from magazines for practitioners to also highly specialized scientific ones of which several are the leaders in their respective fields.

== History ==
The publishing house was founded in 1936 by August Lutzeyer under his name in Berlin. In 1964 the company was renamed into Nomos Verlagsgesellschaft, and belonged to the Suhrkamp Verlag until December 1998. Since July 1999 the Nomos Verlagsgesellschaft belongs to the German C.H. Beck group and in 2002 a new General Director was appointed. Nomos has kept an independence in regard to its own development and was able to incorporate several other publishers. In 2015, Nomos purchased Edition Sigma, an academic published founded by Rainer Bohn in 1984. By 2017 the Tectum Publishing house and in 2018 also the Ergon as well as Academia Publishing followed. In 2021 the publisher Richard Hampp was incorporated into Nomos.
