= Pauline Staegemann =

Prussian socialist and trade unionist (1838–1909)

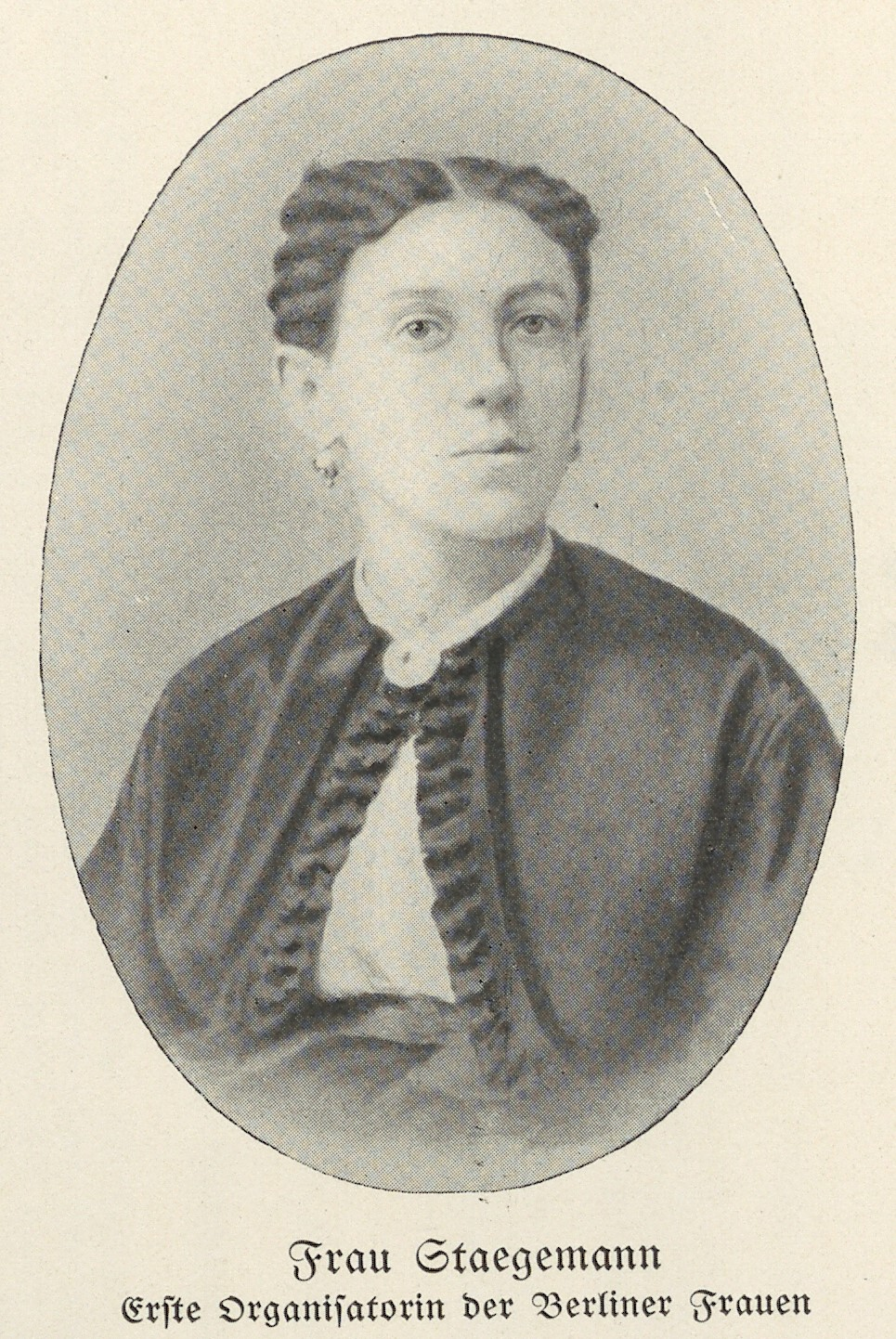
- Born: Pauline Schuck; 18 March 1838; Oderberg, Prussia
- Died: 5 September 1909 (aged 71); Berlin, Prussia
- Occupations: Socialist and trade unionist
- Organization(s): Berlin Workers' Wives' and Girls' Association, Association for the Representation of Female Workers' Interests
- Political party: Social Democratic Party of Germany (SPD)
- Children: 4

Pauline Staegemann (née Schuck, 18 March 1838 – 5 September 1909) was a Prussian socialist, feminist and trade unionist. She was a member of the Social Democratic Party of Germany (SPD) and lead the women's organisations Berlin Workers' Wives' and Girls' Association and the Association for the Protection of Female Workers' Interests.

== Early life ==
Staegemann was born to a working class family in 1838 in Oderberg, Brandenburg, Prussia. She moved to Berlin and worked as a maid when she was 18 years old.

Staegemann married bricklayer Karl-Ludwig Staegemann in 1865. They had four children. After her husband died at an early age, Staegemann ran a greengrocer's shop in a working-class neighbourhood of Berlin to support her family.

== Activism ==
Staegemann's shop became an informal and secret meeting place for members of the early labour movement, but under the Prussian Association Act this political activity was banned until 1908. Staegemann also joined the Sozialdemokratische Partei Deutschlands (Social Democratic Party of Germany) (SPD) and her children helped to distribute leaflets for the party.

Staegemann co-founded the Berliner Arbeiterfrauen und Mädchenverein (Berlin Workers' Wives' and Girls' Association), with Berta Hahn, Johanna Schackow and Ida Cantius, on 28 February 1873. It was the first women's social democratic organisation in Berlin and Staegemann was chair until its dissolution. The Association addressed a resolution to the Chancellor on behalf of female workers in lingerie and clothing factories who were required to buy their sewing thread from their employers at inflated prices.

In early 1874, when a pastor refused to bury a worker killed in a traffic accident free of charge, Staegemann criticised the clergy and the Association raised funds for the funeral costs to give to his young widow. She also called a public meeting where she raised the "strongest protest against the highly unchristian coldness and intolerance" with which a clergyman in Rixdorf had buried a person who died by suicide. In June 1874, the Association was considered "dangerous to the state" and was provisionally banned and prosecuted. Staegemann and Cantius were arrested and imprisoned for nine months in Barnim women's prison in Friedrichshain.

After the complete banning of the Berlin Workers' Wives' and Girls' Association in 1877, Staegemann co-founded the Women's Aid Association for Handworkers in 1881, which was banned shortly after its founding. Staegemann then joined the Verein zur Wahrung der Intersessen von Arbeiterinnen (Association for the Protection of Female Workers' Interests) when it was established in February 1885. She led this organisation with Emma Ihrer and Marie Hofmann, until this organisation was also banned in December 1886.

Staegemann nevertheless continued campaigning for the rights of women workers and reducing social inequality, fighting for statutory working hours, the abolition of night and Sunday work and regular wage payments. She was particularly focused on low-level female homeworkers like laundresses and coat seamstresses and their exploitative working conditions. When she felt it necessary, Staegemann disguised herself as a man to campaign, wearing one of her son's suits and using his name, Paul Staegemann.

Staegemann served as a delegate to the International Workers Congress of Paris 1889 with Clara Zetkin. In 1893, the Association for the Protection of the Interests of Women Workers was re-established and Staegemann delivered the founding speech to approximately 500 women.

== Death ==
Shortly before Staegemann's death, the new Reich Association Law was passed in 1908, giving women workers the right to engage in political activity. She died on 5 September 1909 in Berlin, Prussia.

== Legacy ==
Pauline-Staegemann-Straße in Berlin was named in her honour.

From August 2004, the Pauline Staegemann Prize has been awarded by the Albert-Schweitzer Familienwerks Brandenburg (ASF). The inaugural award was presented to Gesine Schwan, President of the European University Viadrina, for her commitment to social democracy and women's politics.

Staegemann's great-granddaughter Jutta Limbach is the former President of the Federal Constitutional Court.
