= Ottilie Baader =

German women's right activist and socialist

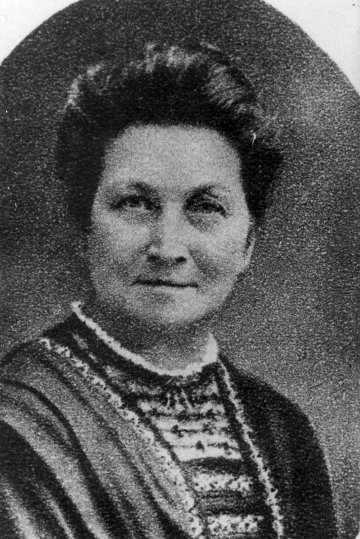
- Born: 30 May 1847; Raków, Poland
- Died: 24 July 1925 (aged 78); Berlin, Germany
- Occupations: women's rights activist and socialist
- Notable work: Ein Steiniger Weg

Ottilie Baader (30 May 1847 – 24 July 1925) was a German women's rights activist and socialist. In 1900–1908, she was a central agent (German: Zentralvertrauensperson) of the comrades of Germany (Social Democratic Party). Baader was one of the founders of the first trade union organization for women in Germany.

== Early life ==
Ottilie Baader was born on 30 May 1847 in Raake (today Raków, Poland). She was the oldest daughter of four children in the family. Her mother died in 1855 and she was raised by her father. She attended school in Frankfurt/Oder for four years. Nevertheless, Baader managed to get a relatively good education, as her father gave her evening lessons at home. At the age of 13, Baader moved with her family to Berlin and was employed at a factory working for 12 hours a day as a manual worker, later a seamstress.

In 1879, Baader gave her first speech in a gathering of shift workers that made the breakthrough in public. Under the impression of Karl Marx's Das Kapital and Bebel's Woman Under Socialism, she came to social democracy and joined Lina Morgenstern's middle-class workers' association. The association offered free courses in reading, writing and German.

== Activism ==
In 1885, Ottilie Baader was one of the founders of the "Association of Berlin Mantle Sewers", the first trade union organization for women in Germany; for this activity, she received her first sentence in prison, which she avoided after Friedrich III issued a general amnesty on his accession to the throne in 1888.

In early 1890s, Baader left work at Sternberg cuff and collar factory in Berlin and started to work from home as she had to care for her disabled father. Living with her father, Baader established her own independence and identity through participation in socialist politics. Through socialism, she found the means of self-assertion against gender and class inequalities.

In 1891, Baader was a member of the board of the workers' education school, opened on the initiative of Wilhelm Liebknecht. The same year Baader was elected as one of the delegates of the Berlin Social Democrats to the 2nd International Workers’ Congress in Brussels, where together with other women she imposed a resolution on equal rights of men and women in the Social Democratic parties.

Baader actively participated in agitation tours of the Social Democratic Party. From 1892 to 1894, she performed in 75 meetings, including meeting in other cities such as in Wroclaw, Stralsund, Dresden, Potsdam, Cottbus and Spremberg. In 1896 she made six agitation tours in Elbingen, Königsberg, Memel and Danzig.

According to the Prussian Laws of Association women were not allowed to be members of political organizations until 1908, but the Social Democratic Party circumvented it through a structure of contact persons or agents (Vertrauenspersonen) and agitation committees (Agitationskommissionen). In September 1900, Baader was chosen as the central agent of the comrades (Zentralvertrauensperson) in Germany. She held this position in Social Democratic Party of Germany voluntary for four years and later the party paid her salary. On this position, Baader was leading the socialist women's movement in Germany. As a central agent of the women's movement, she had a strong influence on local agents.

In 1908, women were allowed to join the Social Democratic Party and the system of female agents had become superfluous. Baader joined the party as its member and stayed in the Social Democratic Women's Office until its dissolution in 1917.

In 1921, Baader published her autobiography Ein Steiniger Weg in which she told how she had become a socialist and what her accomplishments in the movement were. Her book became one of the dozens of German working-class life narratives that appeared during the growth of socialism from the early 1890s through the 1920s.

Ottilie Baader died on 24 July 1925 in Berlin and was buried in the Gerichtsstrasse cemetery.

== Works ==
1921 – Ein Steiniger Weg. (autobiography)
