= Raków, Opole Voivodeship =

Raków
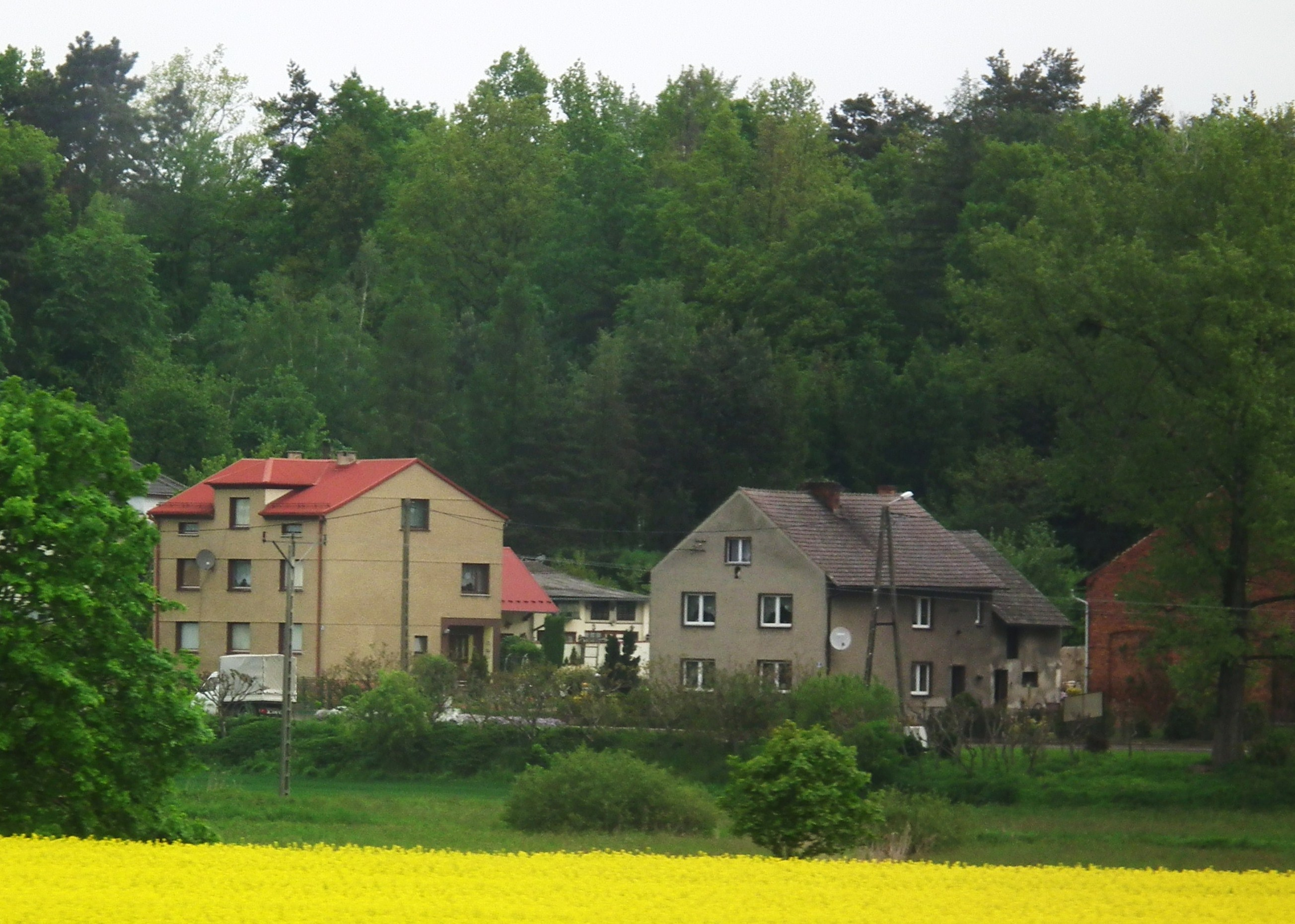

- Location within Poland
- Coordinates: 50°7′49″N 18°1′17″E
- Country: Poland
- Voivodeship: Opole
- County: Głubczyce
- Gmina: Baborów
- Time zone: UTC+1 (CET)
  - Summer (DST): UTC+2 (CEST)
- Postal code: 48-120
- Area code: +48 77
- Car plates: OGL

Raków [ˈrakuf] is a village in Gmina Baborów, Głubczyce County, Opole Voivodeship, in south-western Poland. It is situated on the Psina River.

The name of the village is of Polish origin and comes from the word rak, which means "crayfish".

As of 1861, the village had a population of 548, Poles and Moravians by ethnicity, Catholics by confession.
