= Zundel =

Zundel is both a given name and a surname. Notable people with the name include:

- Zundel Kroizer (1924-2014), Israeli rabbi and author
- Zundel Salant (1786–1866), Ashkenazi rabbi
- Claus Zundel, German composer
- Enoch Zundel ben Joseph (died 1867), Russian Talmudist
- Ernst Zündel (1939–2017), German publisher and Holocaust denier, the subject of the Canadian legal case, R. v. Zundel
- Georg Zundel (1931–2007), German chemist, for whom the Zundel cation is named
- Georg Friedrich Zundel (1875–1948), German painter
- George Lorenzo Zundel (1885–1950), American mycologist
- Irene Zundel (born 1958), Mexican sculptor, painter, and photographer
- John Zundel (1815–1882), American composer
- Maurice Zundel (1887–1975), Swiss theologian
- Thomas Zündel (born 1987), Austrian footballer
- Zebi Hirsch Zundel (fl. 16th century), Polish Jewish scholar
