= Portrait of Mr. X (Pierre Loti) =

Painting by Henri Rousseau

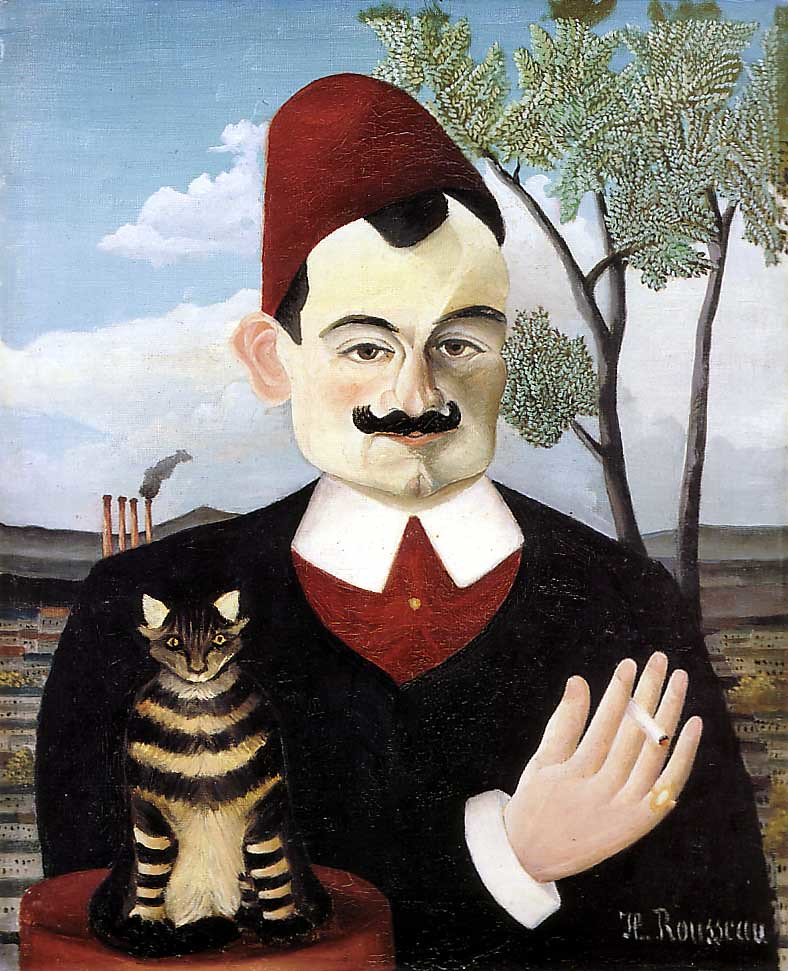
- Artist: Henri Rousseau
- Year: 1906
- Medium: oil on canvas
- Dimensions: 61 cm × 50 cm (24 in × 20 in)
- Location: Kunsthaus Zürich; Zürich, Switzerland

Portrait of Mr. X (Pierre Loti) is a painting by the French artist Henri Rousseau. Rendered in simplified forms, it depicts a half-length figure of a man with a cat set against a landscape background. Painted in oil on canvas, the work is 61 cm high and 50 cm wide. It is part of the collection of the Kunsthaus Zürich.

The identity of the man portrayed has not been definitively established. Some authors have suggested that the figure represents the writer Pierre Loti. There is also disagreement regarding the dating of the painting; more recent assessments propose 1906 as the year of its creation. The portrait was a model for various other paintings.

== Description ==
The painting is the portrait of a man shown half-length. With his head turned slightly to the left, he gazes directly at the viewer. His face has a light complexion; the prominently protruding right ear shows a rosy flesh tone. While the right cheek also displays a slight flush, a dark shadow falls on the left of the face. A striking feature is a dark mustache with upturned ends. Above the eyes, the eyebrows appear as narrow black arches.

Above the exposed forehead, the man wears a red head covering, presumably an oriental fez. Beneath it, well-groomed dark hair is visible at the sides and in the center. The man’s clothing includes a red shirt with a golden button at chest height and a closed, broad white collar. Over the shirt he wears a black garment, which may be an Arab cloak; possibly a burnous.

The right arm is bent across the left side of the chest. The hand emerges from a white shirt cuff, with the fingers extended upward. Between the index and middle fingers, the man holds a lit cigarette; the little finger is adorned with a gold ring. In front of the man, on the left side of the composition, sits a tabby cat on a round, pedestal-like cushion. Like the man, it is depicted frontally, and its posture appears statuesque.

In the background, a hilly landscape unfolds, above which stretches a blue sky with white clouds. On both sides of the man, at some distance, stand uniform rows of houses arranged one behind the other. In the left half of the painting, four factory chimneys rise side by side above the man’s shoulder, the one on the right emitting dark smoke. On the opposite side, an acacia tree grows behind the shoulder up to the upper edge of the canvas. For the art historian Michel Hoog, the tree and the chimneys symbolically represent the contrast between wild nature and urban industry. Other oppositions appear in the pairings of human and animal as well as Orient and Occident.

Connections within the composition emerge between the chimneys in the background and the lit cigarette in the foreground, between the horizontal lines of the cat’s fur and those of the rows of houses, or between the red circular forms of the man’s headgear and the cat’s seat. Overall, black, white, red, and ochre dominate, with the colors applied with little modulation. Striking features include the disproportionately large head and the strong simplification of forms, particularly in the “almost cubistically faceted face”. The man’s frontal pose and the collage-like arrangement of the hand bear similarities to depictions on playing cards, as various authors have noted.

The author Cornelia Stabenow emphasized the “dandy-like figure” of the sitter, with which Rousseau staged “the eccentric role of the poet par excellence”. The painting is signed “H. Rousseau” at the lower right, but is not dated.

== Reception ==
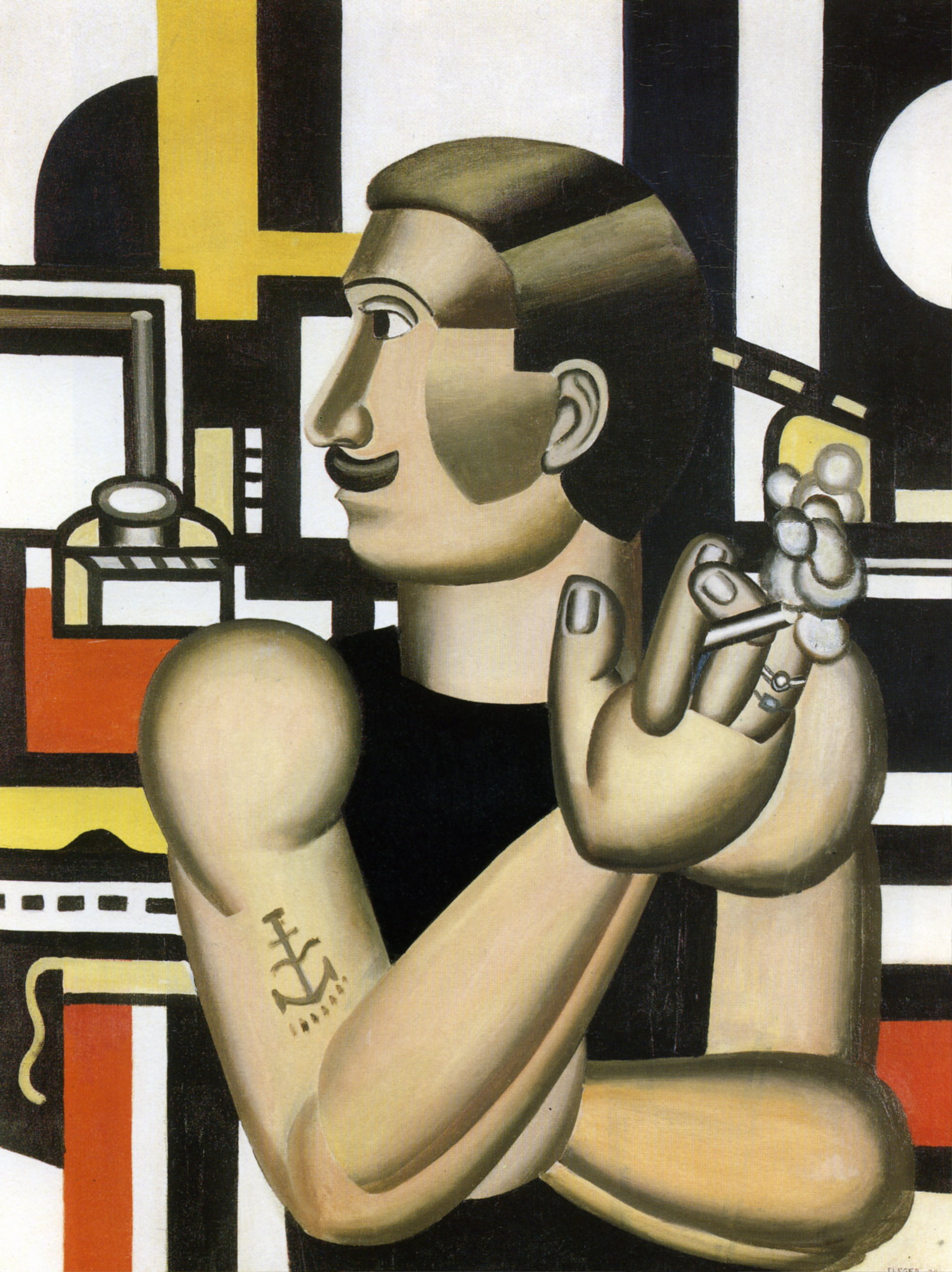
Fernand Léger, Le Mécanicien

The work of Henri Rousseau exerted a strong influence on several modern painters. Pablo Picasso, in particular, greatly admired his work and owned various of his paintings in his private collection. Although the impact of an individual painting by Rousseau on the work of another artist can rarely be traced with certainty, for Portrait of Mr. X the situation is different. In the work of numerous artists, the influence of Rousseau’s painting is clearly evident.

Thus, in the painting Le Mécanicien (1918) by Fernand Léger numerous parallels can be identified with Rousseau’s Portrait of Mr. X. Particularly striking is the similarity in the pose of the hand holding a lit cigarette. Overall, Léger-like Rousseau-employed simplified forms, a palette restricted to pure colors, and a pronounced frontal composition.

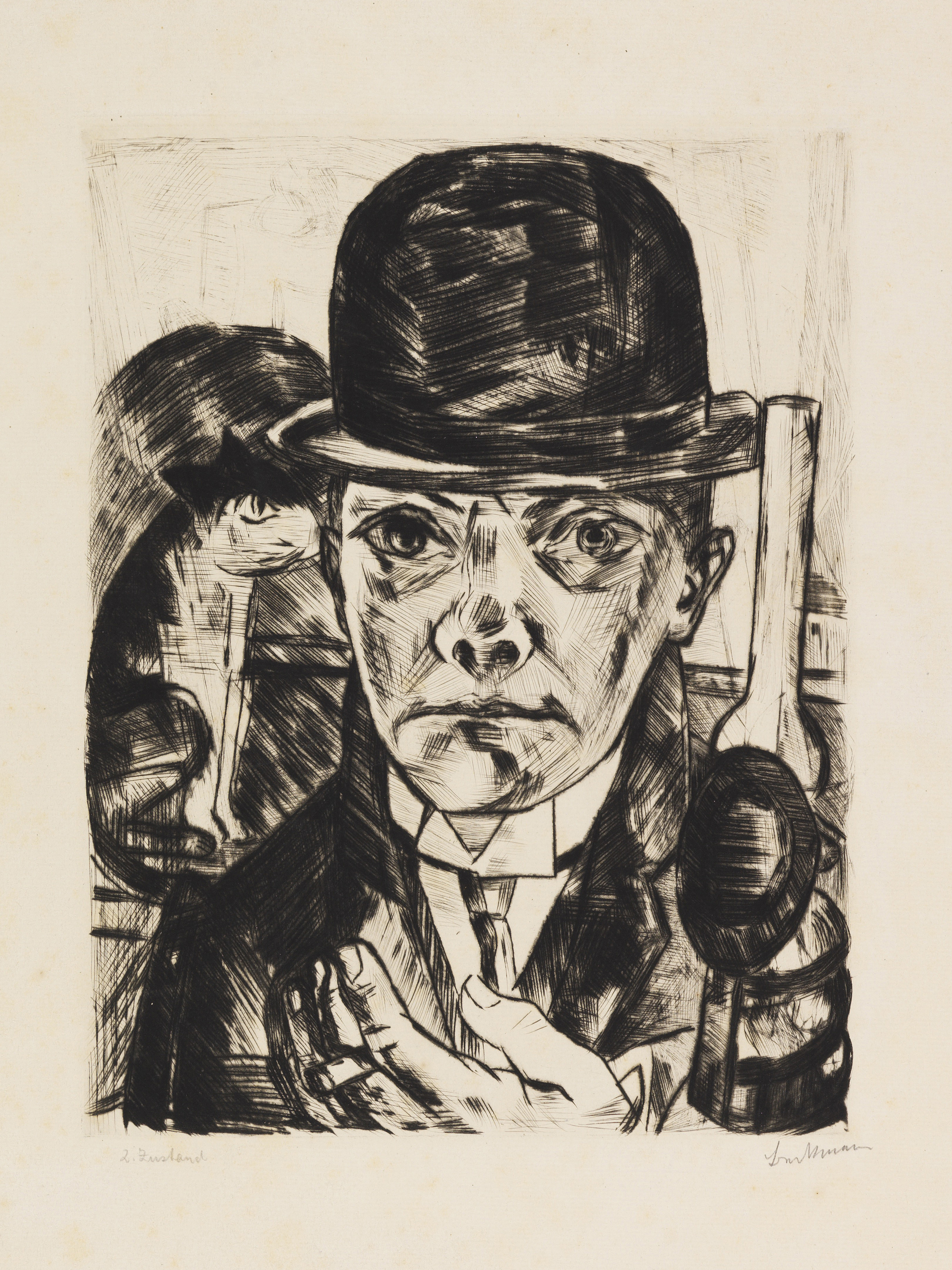
Max Beckmann, Self-Portrait with Stiff Hat

In Germany, Portrait of Mr. X became known through Wilhelm Uhde's Rousseau biography of 1914. In the years that followed, German artists also engaged with Rousseau’s painting. In 1921, Max Beckmann produced the etching Self-Portrait with Stiff Hat, which likewise features a conspicuously raised hand holding a cigarette. Beckmann, like Rousseau, also included a cat in the image.

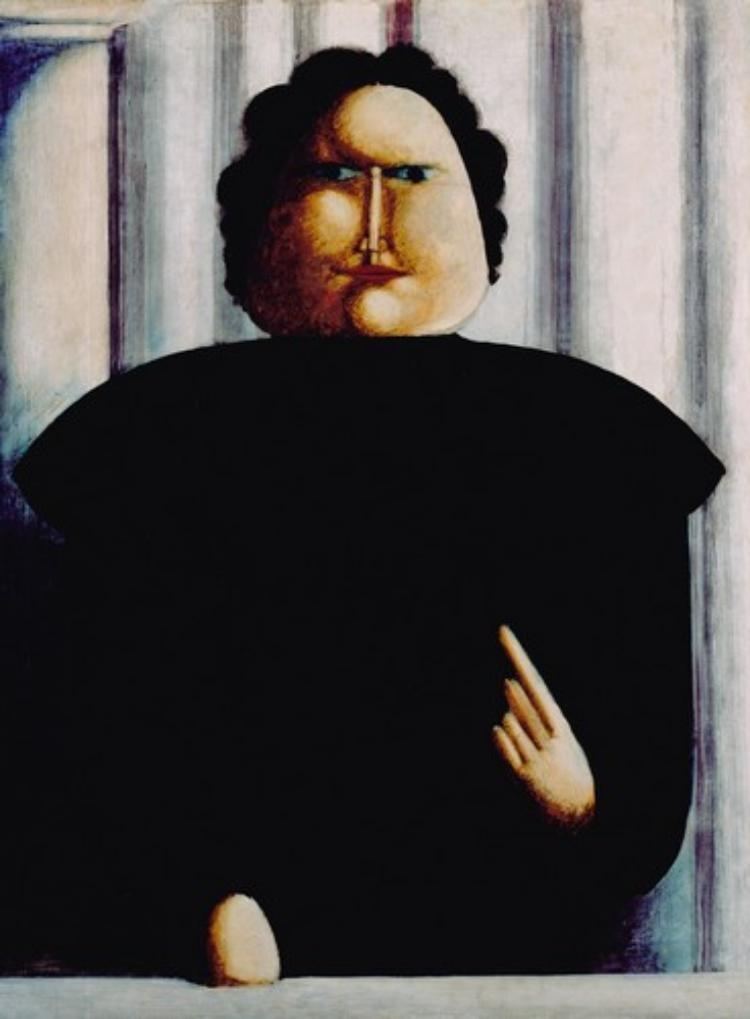
Oskar Schlemmer, Paracelsus (The Lawgiver)

Another great admirer of Rousseau’s art was Oskar Schlemmer. In 1915 he wrote in his diary, “I am back with Henri Rousseau.” He further praised the “folk painter” for his “colorful Cubism” and expressed his wish to paint, “in the spirit of Rousseau”, “a strangely beautiful portrait”. In Schlemmer’s painting Paracelsus (The Lawgiver) of 1923 (Staatsgalerie Stuttgart), the connection to Rousseau’s Portrait of Mr. X becomes particularly apparent. The art historian Götz Adriani emphasized the “uncompromisingly forceful frontality” of Schlemmer’s portrait of Paracelsus while also identifying references to Rousseau’s Portrait of Mr. X in the gesture of the hand and the “mask-like” facial features.
