= Georg Zundel =

German scientist (1931–2007)

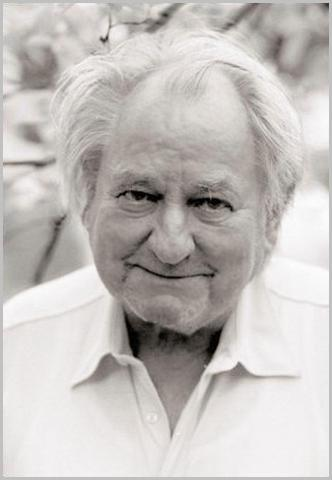
- Georg Zundel
- Born: 17 May 1931; Tübingen, Germany
- Died: 11 March 2007 (aged 75); Salzburg, Austria
- Education: LMU Munich
- Known for: Zundel cation Berghof Foundation
- Relatives: Georg Friedrich Zundel (father); Robert Bosch (grandfather)
- Scientific career
- Fields: physical chemistry
- Workplaces: LMU Munich

Georg Zundel (17 May 1931 – 11 March 2007) was a German physicist, entrepreneur, and peace politics committed philanthropist. He was notable for his scientific work on hydrogen bonding and as a founder of the Berghof Foundation, for which he was awarded the Great Cross of Merit of the Federal Republic of Germany in 2003.

== Childhood and youth ==
Georg Zundel was born in 1931 as the only son of Georg Friedrich Zundel and Paula Zundel. He spent his childhood and youth on his parents' estate, the Berghof near Tübingen, and on the family farm in Haisterkirch, Bad Waldsee. His appreciation of agriculture stemmed from this experience in times of food shortages. At the same time, Zundel was confronted at a young age by an environment marked by political and economic tensions through his parental home. His mother Paula Zundel was the daughter of the entrepreneur Robert Bosch. His father Georg Friedrich Zundel was married in his first marriage to the women's rights activist Clara Zetkin. As a painter of large-scale workers' portraits, he had caused a sensation at the turn of the 20th century. Due to the war, Georg Zundel was not able to graduate from high school until 1952, whereupon he began studies in physics at LMU Munich. Before and during his studies, he traveled through Italy and Greece by motorcycle in 1951 and 1952. In 1955, he and a friend conducted a nine-month journey in a converted Unimog from Stuttgart via Afghanistan to India and back.

== Scientific career ==
After interrupting his physics studies at LMU Munich in 1955/56 for a study visit to Goethe University Frankfurt, Zundel received his doctorate from LMU Munich in 1961. There he was also habilitated in 1967 and appointed university lecturer in 1972. From 1974 to 2006, he was an associate professor of biophysical chemistry at LMU Munich. During this time, he supervised 39 doctoral students.

As a scientist, he contributed to hydrogen bonding research, with the "Zundel cation" H_{5}O_{2}^{+} being one of his most famous discoveries. His scientific work includes over 300 publications in international journals on topics of physical chemistry and biophysics.

The focus is on hydrogen bonds and their investigation using the infrared spectroscopy method. Depending on the bond strength of the acceptor and donor side, such bridges show up in the infrared spectrum over several hundred wavenumbers (3500 to under 650 cm^{−1}) or between wavelengths of 2.7 and over 10 micrometers a continuous absorption. It is attributed to the fact that the bridging protons, caused by the easy polarizability of the charge between the donor and acceptor side, cover a broad spectrum of absorption frequencies in the fluctuating environment in the infrared wavelength range. The absorption is observed both in aqueous acidic solutions, whereby the H_{5}O_{2}^{+} ions that are formed are the basic unit, and in alkaline solutions, where it is the charge fluctuations in the H_{3}O_{2}^{−} structure. Furthermore, continuously absorbing bridges are also observed in biological systems, where proton donor and acceptor can exist in different forms, for example between the nitrogen atom of an amine group and the oxygen atom of a phosphate group.

Transcending the boundaries of the Cold War, Zundel always understood science as a universal task. In the early 1960s, he was one of the first exchange researchers at a natural science institute in Moscow. Soon after, his postdoctoral thesis "Hydration and Intermolecular Interaction. Infrared Investigations with Polyelectrolyte Membranes" in both English and Russian. At the beginning of the 1970s, he intensified his cooperation, especially with Polish colleagues, for which he was appointed honorary member of the "Polish Chemical Society" in 1985.

== Entrepreneurial activity ==
Zundel became involved as an entrepreneur by founding the "Physikalisch-Technisches Laboratorium Berghof GmbH" in 1966. Its goal was to commercially exploit research results in the fields of electrochemistry, membrane filtration and plastics technology. The company became the nucleus of the Berghof group of companies. Many years of innovation and development resulted in a wide range of products in the fields of automation, filtration, photonics, laboratory technology and environmental technology. Today, the Berghof group of companies comprises six subsidiaries with locations in Eningen, Tübingen, Ravensburg, Mühlhausen, Türkenfeld as well as Leeuwarden in the Netherlands.

Zundel also broke new ground in agriculture and forestry. In the Malta Valley of Carinthia, he acquired a forestry operation covering about 3,000 hectares. The development and intensive reforestation of this high mountain forest represented a new challenge for him. Experiments were carried out with the introduction of North American Douglas firs, which also produce growth at altitudes above the existing tree line.

Zundel modernized the "St. Georgshof" in Haisterkirch near Bad Waldsee, an arable and dairy farm that had now been in the family for over eighty years. He recognized the importance of alternative energy early on and set up a first biogas plant on the farm as early as 1981; in the meantime, an output of 50 kilowatts of electricity is generated. In this sense, Zundel was also involved in the field of solar energy in many ways very early on.

== Philanthropic activities ==
His family background enabled Zundel to produce charitable projects.

In the mid-1960s, against massive opposition, he had a student dormitory built in Tübingen to remedy the then acute housing shortage among students.

He was also concerned with the donation of the Kunsthalle Tübingen, opened in 1971, by his mother Paula and his aunt Margarete Fischer-Bosch.

Zundel's most significant philanthropic contribution, however, was his commitment to peace and conflict research. In his childhood and youth, he had been directly confronted with the horrors of war and the National Socialist dictatorship, which instilled in him the search for ways to resolve conflicts without violence. Politically, Zundel became involved in 1949 against the Rearmament of the Federal Republic. In 1958-1961 he participated in protests against the discussed arming of the Bundeswehr with nuclear weapons.

The decisive milestone of his commitment, however, was the establishment and sustained support of the Berghof Foundation for Conflict Research in 1971, which was chaired by Dieter Senghaas for thirty years. Through his foundation, Zundel became the most important private sponsor of this then still young branch of research to this day. Among the most important projects of the foundation include the Berghof Research Center for Constructive Conflict Transformation, founded in 1993 in Berlin as a branch of the Munich foundation, and the Institute for Peace Education (Institut für Friedenspädagogik) in Tübingen (founded 1976, since 2002 in the Georg-Zundel-Haus), which has received increasingly sustained funding since 1977. Both institutions have been able to acquire a nationwide and international reputation thanks to Zundel's continuous and flexible support.

In 1966, he was involved in the founding of the Society for Responsibility in Science.

His commitment to peace was recognized in 2003 under Johannes Rau with the award of the Great Cross of Merit of the Federal Republic of Germany.

== Personal life and death ==
Zundel was married and had three children. He lived with his family in Salzburg until his death in 2007. His grave is located in Haisterkirch near Bad Waldsee.
