= Andrew Gilmour (UN official) =

British UN official and peer

Andrew Gilmour CMG

UN Assistant Secretary-General for Human Rights
- In office 2016–2019
- Appointed by: Ban Ki-moon

UN Director for Political, Peacekeeping, Humanitarian and Human Rights
- In office 2012–2016

Personal details
- Born: March 1964 (age 62)
- Spouse: Emma Williams
- Parent: Ian Gilmour (father)
- Relatives: Oliver Gilmour (brother); David Gilmour (brother); Walter Montagu-Douglas-Scott (grandfather)
- Education: Balliol College, Oxford; London School of Economics

Andrew James Gilmour CMG (born March 1964) was formerly United Nations Assistant Secretary-General for Human Rights, until 2019. He was Director for Political, Peacekeeping, Humanitarian and Human Rights affairs in the Executive Office of the Secretary-General, from 2012 to 2016.

He is the author of the 2024 book The Burning Question: Climate and Conflict - Why Does It Matter?. An environmentalist since joining the WWF at the age of 10, he has published articles on the links between climate change, environmental degradation, human rights and conflict for the Economist, the Financial Times, Bloomberg and Frankfurter Allgememeine Zeitung.

From 2020-2025 he was CEO of the Berghof Foundation in Berlin.

Since 2025 he has been Chair of United Staff for Gaza, and a Trustee of the Edinburgh International Festival, the Kennedy Human Rights Center, and the Reckoning Project. He is an Honorary Patron of the Council for Arab-British Understanding and an Ambassador for the WWF.

== Family ==
Andrew Gilmour is the youngest son of the British cabinet minister and political thinker Lord (Ian) Gilmour of Craigmillar and Lady Caroline Montagu Douglas Scott (daughter of the 8th Duke of Buccleuch). He is the brother of the historian Sir David Gilmour.

He is married to medical doctor and author Emma Williams.

== Education ==
Gilmour was educated at Eton and Balliol College, Oxford, where he read Modern History and won the Gladstone Memorial Prize (1986) for his thesis on The Changing Reactions of the British press to Mussolini, 1935–40. He undertook a master's degree at the London School of Economics in Government and International Relations in 1986–87. He is a Senior Fellow of SOAS University of London and a Visiting Fellow of All Souls College, Oxford.

== UN career ==
Gilmour joined the United Nations in 1989 and worked in Afghanistan, Iraq, South Sudan, the Middle East, West Africa, and the Balkans. In 2016, Secretary-General Ban Ki-moon appointed him UN Assistant Secretary-General for Human Rights, a post he held for over three years until the end of 2019, when he left the UN aged 55. During this period he was assigned the role of UN system-wide focal point for dealing with reprisals and intimidation that are carried out, usually by Governments, against individuals or NGOs who have cooperated with or seek to cooperate with the UN on human rights issues. He was a vocal defender of human rights activists who are under growing threats and pressure for their work.

He has spoken out against human rights violations carried out against the Rohingya people of Myanmar, the Palestinians, the Syrian people and victims in many other countries including China, Egypt, Libya and the Philippines. These followed in particular after his visits to Yemen, Democratic Republic of Congo, South Sudan, Kenya, Liberia, Mali, Burkina Faso, Central African Republic, Afghanistan, Kyrgyzstan, Tajikistan, Honduras, and Colombia.

He has also been an advocate in favour of LGBT rights, victims of torture, rape survivors especially among the Yazidis and Rohingya, and indigenous peoples' rights.

In 2019, Gilmour received the Sir Brian Urquhart Award for distinguished service to the UN. He was appointed Companion of the Order of St Michael and St George (CMG) in the 2020 Birthday Honours for services to human rights.

== Publications ==
Gilmour published a short history of the UN's involvement in the Middle East from 1945 to 2015. He has also published in the Financial Times, the New York Times, the Guardian, Bloomberg, The Economist, The Scotsman, The Nation, and other world publications, including in Africa and Latin America.

He also published "The future of human rights: A view from the UN", in the Journal of Ethics and International Affairs.
