= Berghof Foundation =

German NGO

The Berghof Foundation
- Berghof Foundation Operations gGmbH
- Named after: Zundel's family home
- Established: 1971; 55 years ago
- Founder: Georg Zundel
- Founded at: Tübingen, Germany
- Type: Nonprofit, NGO
- VAT ID no.: DE239451952
- Registration no.: HRB 95319
- Legal status: Foundation
- Locations: Berlin, Germany; Tübingen, Germany
- Coordinates: 52.5062°N 13.3981°E
- Region served: Global
- Executive Director: Andrew Gilmour
- Chair of the Board of Trustees: Johannes Zundel
- Publication: National Dialogue Handbook, Berghof Glossary
- Employees: 10–19 (2024)
- Website: berghof-foundation.org
- Formerly called: Berghof Foundation for Conflict Studies

The Berghof Foundation is a German independent, non-governmental and non-profit organisation that supports efforts to prevent political and social violence, and achieve sustainable peace through conflict transformation.

Originally established by Professor Dr. Georg Zundel in 1971, the organisation’s development is currently run by members of the Zundel family in their roles as shareholders and trustees. Based in Berlin, Germany, the Foundation also maintains a branch office in Tübingen, Germany, as well as project offices in a number of regions including Africa, the Middle East & North Africa (MENA), Latin America and Caucasus. The organisation is a recognised player in global Track II diplomacy efforts.

The Berghof Foundation strives to support processes that seek to transform violent and destructive conflicts into nonviolent social and political exchanges. The operational approach of the Berghof Foundation involves three fields: practice, learning and research.

Andrew Gilmour is the Executive Director of the Berghof Foundation since May 2020. The Chair of the Board of Trustees is Johannes Zundel, Chief Executive Officer (CEO) of the Berghof Foundation Trust. Professor Hans J. Giessmann has been the Executive Director of the Berghof Foundation between 2008 and 2020.

== History ==
Established in 1971 by Professor Dr. Georg Zundel, the Berghof Foundation, formerly known as the Berghof Foundation for Conflict Studies was a private limited company that supported critical analyses on the arms race during the height of the Cold War. By 1977, the foundation began its support for the Association for Peace Education Tübingen. In 1989, the foundation established a research facility in Berlin known as the Research Institute of the Berghof Foundation and by 1993, it became the Berghof Research Center for Constructive Conflict Management.

At this time, Berghof shifted its focus from the altering dynamics of the arms race towards the resolution of ethno-political conflicts. Globally-oriented support for peace processes was implemented in 2004. In 2005, project work was extended to include resistance and liberation movements and former non-state armed groups.

When founder Georg Zundel died, his family resolved to carry on the organisation’s work in 2007. In 2012, the three areas that had been operating independently — conflict research, peace support and peace education — integrated into one new entity: Berghof Foundation.

== Organisation ==
The Berghof Foundation describes its mission as bringing people in conflict together and states, "To create space for conflict transformation."

On an operational level, the Berghof Foundation works in three fields of activity: Supporting peace building efforts on the ground activities, promoting peace education and conducting research on both the drivers of conflict and the solutions for sustainable peace.

According to the organisation, the Berghof Foundation has worked in over 50 countries over the last five years. Currently, there are projects in the following regions: Asia, Sub-Saharan Africa, Middle East and North Africa, Latin America and Europe:

=== Asia ===
Current projects include Berghof's support towards Afghan-driven efforts to resolve the protracted conflict and to restore resilient and sustainable peace in close cooperation with the German Federal Foreign Office. In July 2019, the Berghof Foundation co-organised and moderated a series of closed-door sessions at the Intra-Afghan Conference for Peace.

There are, additionally, three research and learning projects in this region covering topics ranging from gender to resistance liberation movements. These projects include “From female combatants to post-war democratic leaders”, “Security doctrines in a changing world” and “Supporting women in RLMs (Resistance Liberation Movements) in peace processes and transitions”.

=== Europe ===
In Europe, the Berghof Foundation creates spaces for transformative dialogues in Turkey and engages in memory, history and dialogue in Georgia and Abkhazia, Azerbaijan and Karabakh and as well in Bosnia.

In Germany, the organisation has a long history of involvement with peace education through helping young people recognise peace and non-violence as important values in their lives. Two projects of the Berghof Foundation in this field are frieden-fragen.org as well as the Service Center Peace Education in Baden-Wuerttemberg. In 2019, the Streitkultur 3.0 project was awarded the “Wirkt-Siegel” seal by the German non-profit PHINEO for its work on addressing how young people can identity hate speech and fake news on the internet. In 2020, the organisation started a project on conspiracy theories and peace education.

=== (Sub-Saharan) Africa ===
The organisation is currently active in Ethiopia, Somalia and in cross-regional initiatives, and works closely with the German Federal Foreign Office and the African Union. Furthermore, the Berghof Foundation is involved in a project funded by the EU and implemented by Search for common ground and Interpeace to support national efforts for peace and stability in Burundi, Zimbabwe, and Niger. Formerly, the organisation offered its support in Sudan.

=== Middle East & North Africa ===
Berghof's projects aim at supporting the actors and institutions of the region, as well as the efforts to overcome political and societal divisions through inclusive dialogue processes and consensus-building. Berghof is currently implementing these practices in Syria, Lebanon and Yemen

=== Latin America ===
The Berghof Foundation has applied their understanding of systemic analysis and expertise in mediation and dialogue processes, particularly in the fields of process facilitation and joint learning in Colombia.

== Publications ==
The organisation is widely known for its National Dialogue Handbook and the Berghof Glossary, which presents the 20 main principles of conflict transformation.

== Funding ==
Berghof receives funding from private and public donors. On its website, it features a list of all its funders and partners.
