= Kostja Zetkin =

German physician and activist (1885–1980)

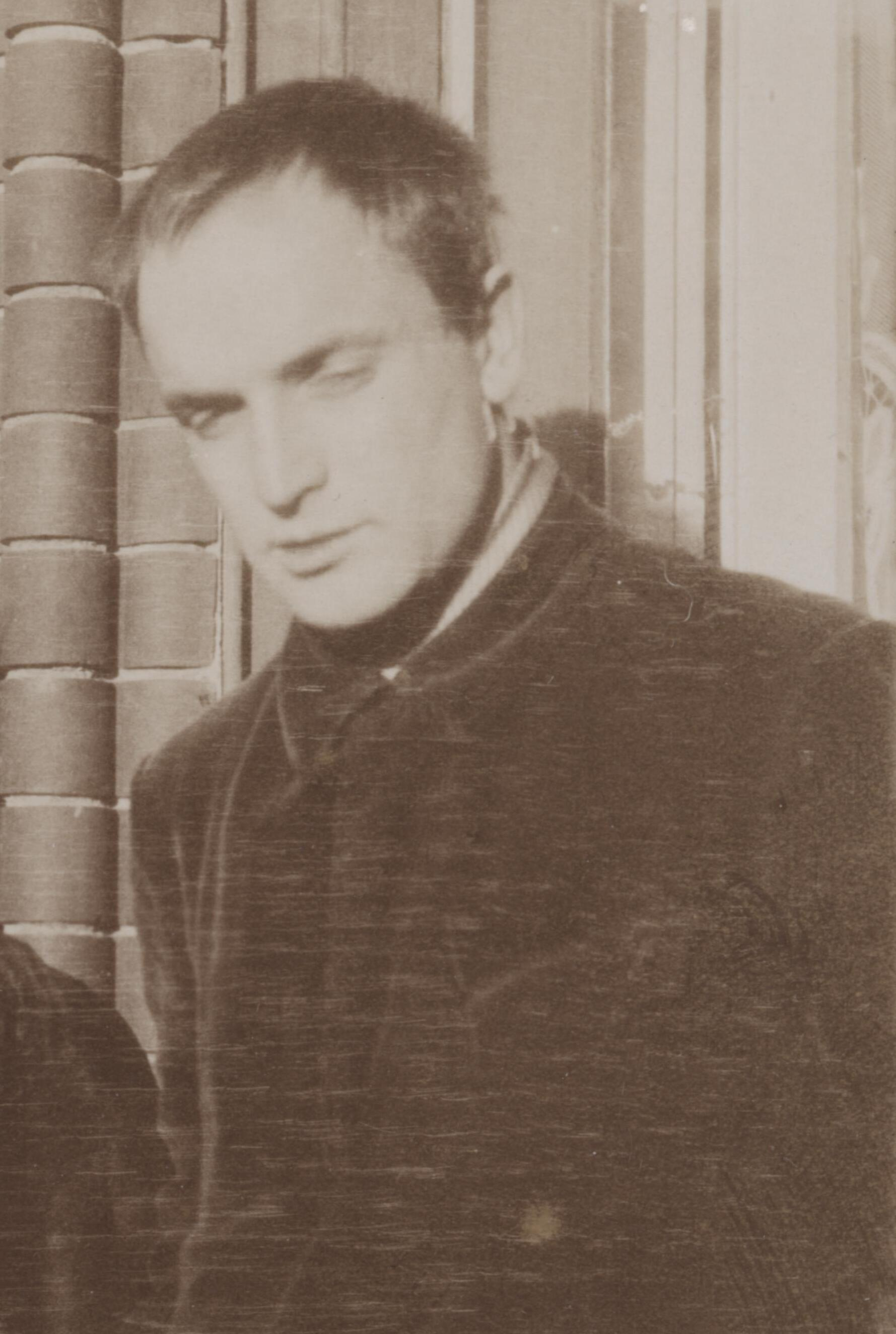
- Zetkin in 1909
- Born: Konstantin Zetkin; 14 April 1885; Paris, France
- Died: September 1980 (aged 95); Halfmoon Bay, British Columbia, Canada
- Occupations: Physician, political activist
- Spouse: Gertrude Bardenhewer (1893–1980)
- Children: Lucas Bennett (step-son)
- Parent(s): Ossip Zetkin (1850–1889); Clara Eißner (1857–1933)
- Relatives: Maxim Zetkin (brother)

Konstantin "Kostja" Zetkin (14 April 1885 – September 1980) was a German physician, social economist and political activist.

He was the son of Clara Zetkin, an iconic pioneer of the political left in Germany. For a time, he became the lover of another, Rosa Luxemburg.

== Life ==
=== Provenance and early years ===
Konstantin Zetkin, always identified as "Kostja" in family correspondence and in almost all other sources, was born in Paris. Kostja's father, Ossip Zetkin (1850–1889), was a Russian revolutionary and socialist who had suffered persecution on account of his involvement in the Narodniks movement and fled to Leipzig where, as a young man, he had supported himself as a carpenter and become active in student politics. That was how he met the trainee teacher, Clara Eißner (1857–1933). In the context of the recently enacted Anti-Socialist Laws Ossip Zetkin was arrested at a political meeting in 1880, identified as a "burdensome foreigner" ("lästiger Ausländer") and deprived of his Leipzig residence permit. He moved to Paris where, two years later, he was joined by Clara Eißner. The two had probably become lovers in Leipzig, and now they resumed their partnership. Clara adopted his family name, but the two of them never formally married.

According to one source they could not marry because Ossip was unable to obtain the necessary papers from Russia: another version indicates that Clara was reluctant to enter into a marriage which would have caused her to lose her German citizenship. Their two sons, Maxim and Kostja, were born in 1883 and 1885.

Ossip Zetkin died from tuberculosis at the start of 1889. In 1891 Clara Zetkin moved with her two boys back to Germany. Instead of returning to Saxony, where she had been born and grown up, she took her family to live in the west of the country, in Stuttgart, where she remained till the mid-1920s, and where Kostja and his elder brother grew up. At first the boys had difficulties with the German language, but they overcame any initial educational handicaps by the time they were old enough for secondary school. They both attended the well-regarded Karls-Gymnasium (secondary school) in Stuttgart, while their mother energetically pursued a political and journalistic career as an activist member of the Social Democratic Party (SPD) and as editor of Gleichheit, a bimonthly women's newspaper committed to gender equality.

=== Rosa Luxemburg and student years ===
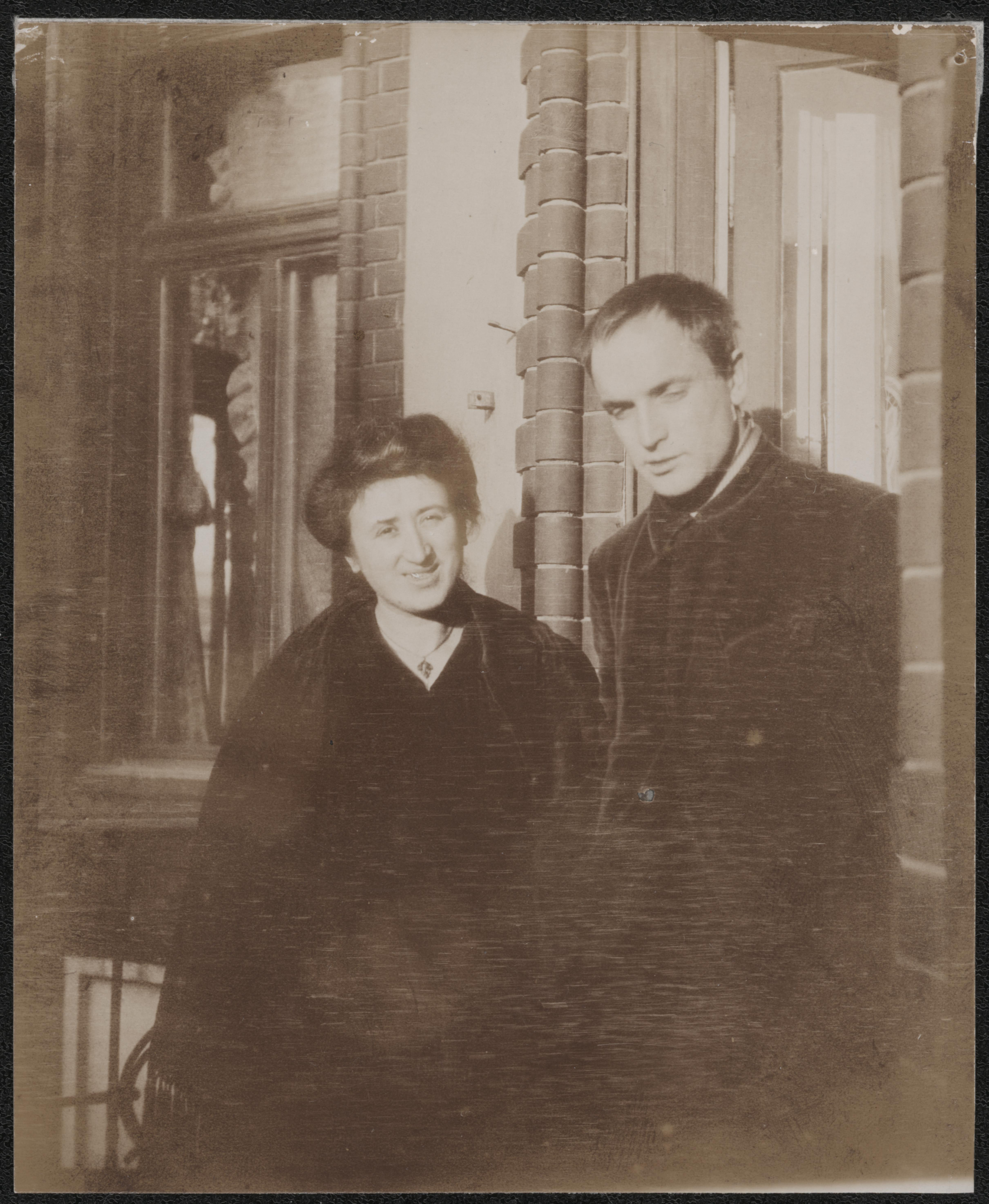
Zetkin with Rosa Luxemburg

It was presumably as a result of his mother's political activism that Kostja Zetkin met Rosa Luxemburg. He became the lover of his mother's friend in 1907, and this aspect of the relationship with Rosa Luxemburg lasted till his conscription in 1915, although they would remain lifelong friends.

It was also at least partly on Luxemburg's recommendation that he studied social economics, while lodging with her in Berlin. Social economics was the subject on which Luxemburg herself lectured at the SPD Party Academy. However, at some stage Kostja Zetkin switched to the study of Medicine (which was also the subject that his brother studied between 1902 and 1908).

=== War ===
War was declared in July 1914 and on 5 March 1915, before he had been able to complete his medical studies, Kostja Zetkin was conscripted into the army. He served as a medical officer on the Western Front, participating in the Battle of the Somme, at Verdun and, later, at Rheims. He continued as a medical officer through several promotions, and was awarded the Iron Cross (Class II) on 10 November 1916. After war ended in 1918 he resumed his medical studies, passing his state medical exams in 1923 with a distinction.

=== Mother and politics ===
During the years after 1923 his mother's health deteriorated progressively and he devoted a substantial part of his energy to looking after her and to supporting her political work. At one stage he described himself wryly as his mother's "technical worker" ("technischer Mitarbeiter"). His mother remained a prolific writer, and her letters disclose that, during the 1920s and early 1930s, Kostja Zetkin was living for a time with Nadja von Massov. (Rosa Luxemburg had been assassinated early in 1919.)

In 1923, Kostja Zetkin was a co-instigator, together with Karl Korsch, György Lukács and Richard Sorge, in founding the Institute for Social Research ("Institut für Sozialforschung" / IFS) at Frankfurt University. In connection with the IFS, he was also one of those who took part in the "First Marxist Work Week" conference held near Arnstadt for eight days towards the end of May 1923.

=== Nazi Germany ===
After the decline of the Weimar Republic, the Nazis took power in January 1933 and lost little time in transforming Germany into a one- party dictatorship. Jews and Communists were marked out as targets for state persecution, especially after the Reichstag fire in February 1933. Clara Zetkin was a high-profile communist and Ossip Zetkin had been Jewish. Kostja Zetkin moved to the Soviet Union, where Kostja's elder brother Maxim had been working as a physician since 1920. Clara Zetkin had already lived in Moscow and been looked after there by her elder son between 1924 and 1929.

=== Moscow ===
Clara Zetkin died on 20 June 1933 at Arkhangelskoye, a short distance outside Moscow. As a high-profile communist, friend of Rosa Luxemburg and feminist activist over many decades, Clara Zetkin enjoyed a quasi-iconic status with Moscow power brokers, which now proved to be something of a mixed blessing. Kostja Zetkin found himself in disagreement with government representatives, apparently because of differing opinions concerning the selective publication of some of his late mother's large collection of articles, essays, letters and other politically relevant papers. Zetkin evidently appreciated that disagreements with the authorities were unwinnable and that he himself was in danger as long as the situation persisted. He applied for permission to emigrate again, this time to Prague to work as a physician. The application was granted, not without some "bureaucratic reluctance", and in 1935 Kostja Zetkin moved to Czechoslovakia where he remained till 1938.

=== Gertrude Bardenhewer ===
In Czechoslovakia, Kostya Zetkin and Gertrude Bardenhewer became lovers in 1935. Later they married. They were both qualified medical practitioners and there is speculation that they may originally have met as politically active medical students in Berlin.

By 1935, Gertrude Bardenhewer had been a single mother for more than a decade. Keen to give birth to a child with artistic gifts she had teamed up with the artist-polymath Otto Tetjus Tügel, given birth to their son Lukas, and then gone on her way, taking the baby with her. By the late 1930s the boy was virtually grown up, and finding himself in London when war broke out in 1939 he joined the British army. A few years later he emigrated to the United States of America. German invasion of Czechoslovakia during 1938 and 1939 enforced further flight. Kostja and Gertrude, now together, made their way to Paris. Sources differ over whether they left Czechoslovakia shortly before or shortly after German troops occupied the whole country. They travelled via Switzerland where they spent some time and may have contemplated settling. But they also perceived a risk that even in Switzerland the authorities could not protect them from assassination by a gunman-agent sent from the Soviet Union or Germany. The Zetkin name carried its own politically charged legacy.

=== France ===
Kostja Zetkin arrived in France in April 1939. He had already written in a letter to a friend, acknowledging that restrictive employment regulations made it harder for German-qualified physicians to find professional employment in France than in Czechoslovakia. Nevertheless, the Zetkins had friends in France who, in the words of one source, "hid them in the French countryside". Zetkin was able to work as a nurse and as a masseur-physiotherapist. He also took work as a farm labourer.

War returned in September 1939, but it was only in May 1940 that German forces invaded France. The authorities responded by identifying as enemy aliens thousands of German refugees who had been forced to seek refuge in France for reasons of politics and / or race. Zetkin was detained in a camp for four months, almost certainly in the southern part of the country. His comments from the time indicate that conditions in France became so intolerable that he was already looking for ways to move on to another country. He might already have applied – at this stage unsuccessfully – for permission to leave France and enter the United States of America. References in his letters to relatives already in the United States – most likely the family of Gertrude's sister, Inge – certainly hint at that possibility. By the time Zetkin left his internment camp in France, the southern part of the country was governed from Vichy by a puppet government. Security in the camps was at this stage frequently lax, but according to one source Gertrude secured release for the Kostja using the highly unconventional device of disclosing their true identities to a camp guard whom she judged, correctly, to be politically aware, and no friend to the Nazis. The guard responded quietly but pointedly. "We cannot have the son of Clara Zetkin in a prison cell." Even if the story has been embroidered in the telling, it is beyond dispute that Kostja and Gertrude succeeded, with difficulty, in escaping via Spain (and probably Portugal) to the United States, where they arrived in or before 1945. By the time the French authorities had issued them with travel permits, their French travel-identity papers indicate that Kostja and Gertrude were married to one another.

=== North America ===
The Zetkins always felt that they were viewed with mistrust by the authorities in the USA. Initially, the only work they could find as qualified physicians was at a dairy farm. They later found work as "medical orderlies" in a succession of psychiatric institutions, described in one source as "hell holes". War having ended in 1945, by 1949 the Zetkins were trying to find work as physicians back in Germany, but without success. As McCarthyism became mainstream in the political establishment, the fact that Kostja's elder brother, having survived in Moscow the Stalinist purges of the later 1930s, was now back in Germany working as a hospital director and senior professor of medicine at the principal university in Soviet administered East Berlin, will have done nothing to enhance Kostja's own career prospects in the US. Nevertheless, he had work of sorts and was accruing pension entitlement, which he was reluctant to place at risk. Despite becoming increasingly depressed, he continued to work in the US medical system till 1957, when he retired. The Zetkins now relocated one last time, settling in a cottage owned by one of Gertrude's sisters on the Canadian west coast at Halfmoon Bay. By this time Kostja Zetkin's health was failing, and in 1963 he had to undergo a major operation, which involved the removal of most of his stomach, on account of a perforated ulcer. He nevertheless survived the operation and indeed lived on for more than another seventeen years, dying in 1980. Gertrude died a few months later, in January 1981.

== Significance ==
Die Zeit characterised the literary and political importance of Kostja Zetkin in the following terms:

"The most important publication presents the letters of Rosa Luxemburg to Kostja Zetkin. Unfortunately the compilers of the collection of more than 600 letters left out around 70 on account of their "primarily private-intimate character". The restraint is hard to understand when the reader considers the way in which the published letters frequently display a "private-intimate character"".

"Die wichtigste Erstveröffentlichung stellen dabei die Briefe Rosa Luxemburgs an Kostja Zetkin (1885–1980) dar. Leider haben die Herausgeber von den über 600 erhaltenen Briefen wegen ihres "vorwiegend privat-intimen Charakters" rund 70 nicht aufgenommen und gelegentlich "geringe Auslassungen" vorgenommen. Diese Zurückhaltung ist wenig verständlich, zumal wenn man feststellt, daß auch die veröffentlichten Briefe häufig durchaus "privat-intimen" Charakters sind."

Rosa Luxemburg continues to fascinate, and despite her powerful political intellect and activism, her love life also attracts attention. In 2008, to the bewilderment of some scholars, Rosa Luxemburg's life formed the basis for a stage-musical at the Grips-Theater (youth theatre) in Berlin. One commentator wrote:

"Rosa Luxemburg never married: almost always she had younger lovers. According to the actress Regine Seidler (who took the title role in the musical), her happiest time was spent with Kostja Zetkin, the son of her best friend, Clara Zetkin. That was a deep and complete love affair. In East Germany they played down this aspect. The preferred to imply that that Rosa Luxemburg had a motherly relationship with her tenant. A singular rewrite."

"Rosa Luxemburg war zeitlebens unverheiratet, sie hatte fast immer jüngere Liebhaber. Ihre glücklichste Zeit verbrachte sie mit Kostja Zetkin, dem Sohn ihrer besten Freundin Clara Zetkin, erzählt Regine Seidler. Das war eine ganz innige Liebesbeziehung. In der DDR sei dieser Aspekt nicht vorgekommen. Da hieß es dann, dass Rosa Luxemburg ein mütterliches Verhältnis zu ihrem Untermieter hatte. Eine interessante Umschreibung"
