= Maxim Zetkin =

German politician and surgeon (1883–1965)

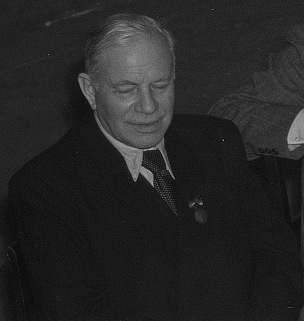
Maxim Zetkin in 1953

Maxim Zetkin (1 August 1883, Paris – 19 August 1965, East Berlin) was a German politician and surgeon.

== Biography ==
Maxim Zetkin was born in Paris in 1883 to Ossip and Clara Zetkin. Two years later his younger brother Kostja was born. After attending a high school in Stuttgart, Zetkin studied medicine in Munich from 1902 to 1908. He received his doctorate there in 1909. In 1902 Zetkin joined the SPD; in 1917 he joined USPD and in 1919 the KPD. In 1919, while still in Stuttgart, he married his mother's employee Marie Johanna Buchheim, with whom he had their son Wolfgang in 1922 (who died in the Second World War in Russia as a Wehrmacht soldier).

From 1920 Zetkin worked as a surgeon in Moscow and was also politically active in Russia. From 1924 onwards he belonged to the Soviet Communist Party. In 1935 he became a lecturer at the Medical Institute in Moscow. In 1936 and 1937 he took part in the Spanish Civil War as a doctor in the ranks of the Republican Army.

After his return to the Soviet Union, he worked in Moscow from 1939 to 1941 as chief physician and then in the Caucasus until the end of the war. In 1942 he married the widowed Emilia Milowidova (1894–1965).

Zetkin returned to Germany after the end of the war in 1945 and was involved in rebuilding the health system in the Soviet occupation zone. He joined the Socialist Unity Party in 1946. From 1947 to 1960 he was a professor at Berlin's Humboldt University. At the same time, he became medical director of the Charité in 1949 and, from 1950, a senior staff member in the Ministry of Health.

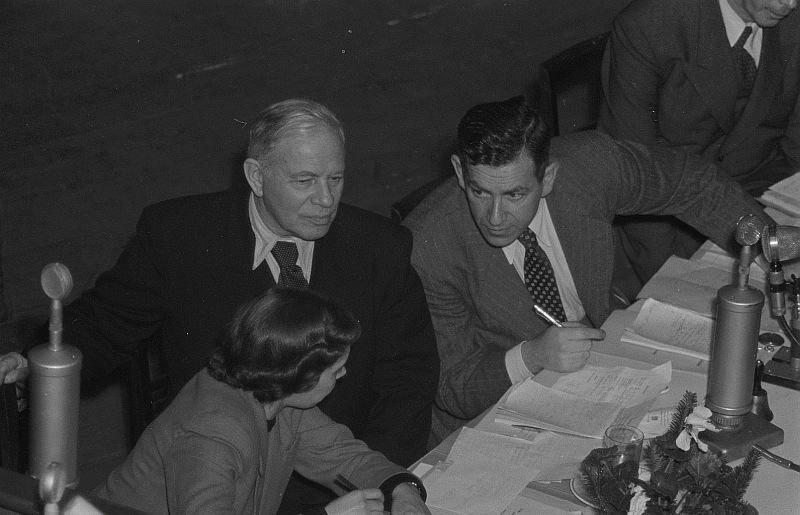
Prof. Dr. Maxim Zetkin with Prof. Dr. Samuel Mitja Rapoport

Maxim Zetkin was a co-founder of the publishing house People and Health and published, among other things, the Dictionary of Medicine (WdM) together with Herbert Schaldach.

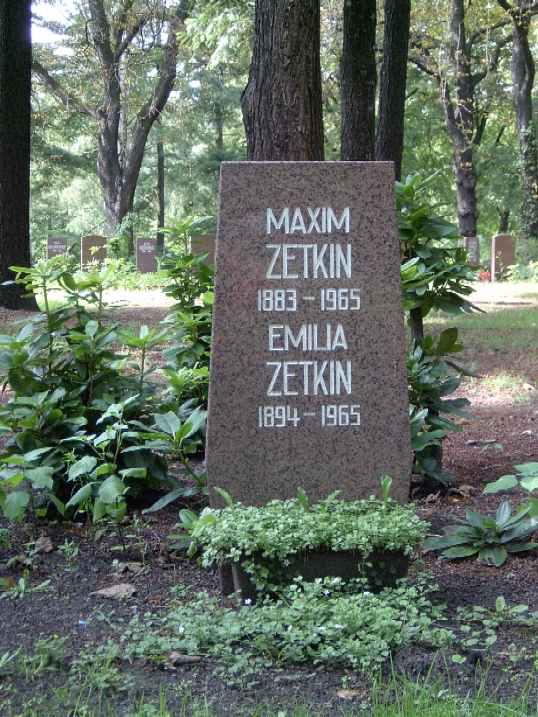
Grave of Maxim Zetkin in Zentralfriedhof Friedrichsfelde in Berlin

In 1955 he became a corresponding member of the German Academy of Sciences in Berlin. He was buried in the "Pergolenweg" grave complex of the Socialist Memorial at the Friedrichsfelde Central Cemetery in Berlin-Lichtenberg. The hospital in Nordhausen was opened in 1983 and the Military Medical Section at the University of Greifswald named after him in 1987.

== Awards and honors ==
- Merited Doctor of the People in (1950)
- Patriotic Order of Merit in bronze in 1955 and silver and gold (1958)
- Hans-Beimler Medal and honorary title of Outstanding People's Scientist (1963).

The hospital in Nordhausen was named after him in 1983 and the military medical section at the University of Greifswald in 1987.
