= Georg Friedrich Zundel =

German painter, farmer and art patron

Georg Friedrich Zundel (13 October 1875 in Iptingen, Wiernsheim – 7 June 1948 in Stuttgart) was a German painter, farmer and art patron.

At the age of fourteen, he went to Pforzheim, where he successfully finished an apprenticeship as a painter in 1891. He then worked as a scene painter at a Frankfurt theatre for six years, before deciding to study art in Karlsruhe, later in Stuttgart, in 1897/98. He was, however, expelled from the State Academy of Fine Arts Stuttgart, after organising a student protest (strike).

His rebellious behaviour was mainly sparked by socialist ideas, that he had taken up in the previous years; in this context, he wanted to fight exploitation and repression of workers. Around the same time, he began a relationship with the much older socialist and feminist editor, politician and translator Clara Zetkin. They married in 1899. From 1903 until their separation in 1928, they lived at a house in Sillenbuch, outside of Stuttgart, where many socialist leaders visited them (most famously Vladimir Lenin in 1907).

In his early years, Zundel painted in the style of realism, mostly choosing socialist motives, often very detailed portrayals of working-class people. He also designed posters and interiors of homes for workers. Later, in the 1910s, he began to focus more on religious and mythological motives. This led to increasing estrangement between Clara Zetkin and him; they split and divorced in 1927.

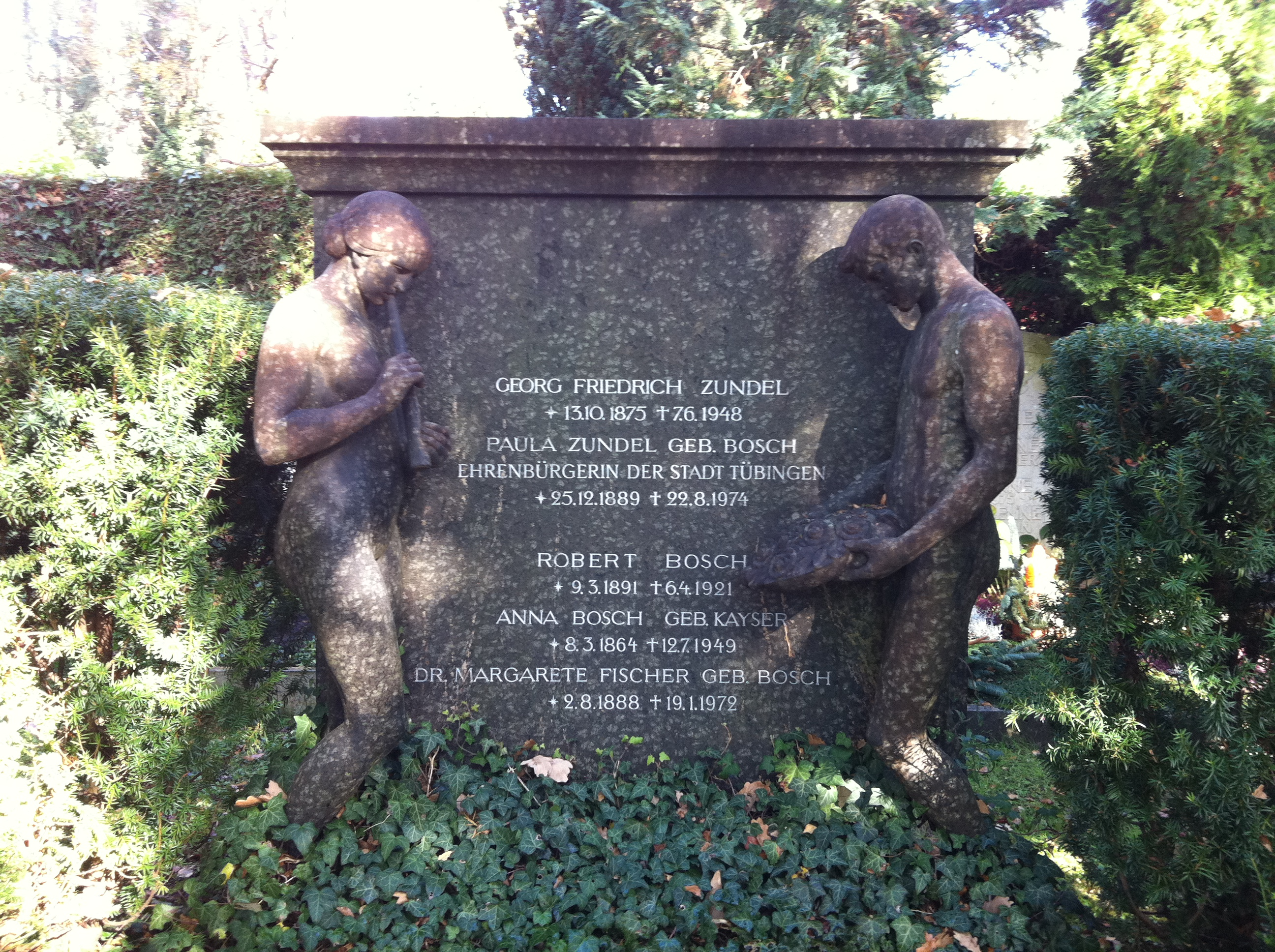
Grave of Georg Friedrich and Paula Zundel at Tübingen

The following year, Zundel married the much younger Paula Bosch, daughter of the industrialist Robert Bosch, whom he had known (and once portrayed) since she had been a child. The couple moved into a farmhouse on a hill, the so-called "Berghof", near Tübingen, which Zundel himself had designed in 1921, and which had been financed by Robert Bosch for his daughters. He started to work as a farmer, painting occasionally, with the focus on idealistic and Christian motives. Paula's and his son Georg (later a famous physical chemist and philanthropist) was born in 1931.

Zundel died in Stuttgart in 1948 and was buried at Tübingen's Stadtfriedhof (site of the graves of Friedrich Hölderlin and Ludwig Uhland).

His widow Paula and her sister Margarete Fischer-Bosch founded Tübingen's now most famous museum, the Kunsthalle Tübingen, in honour of Zundel, in 1971.
