= Clara Zetkin =

German politician (1857–1933)

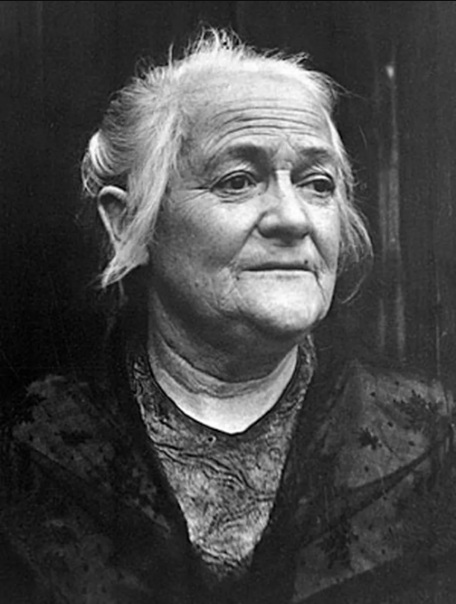
- Zetkin c. 1920

Elder President of the Reichstag
- In office 30 August 1932 – 6 December 1932
- Preceded by: Carl Herold
- Succeeded by: Karl Litzmann

Member of the Reichstag for Chemnitz–Zwickau
- In office 24 June 1920 – 28 February 1933
- Preceded by: Office established
- Succeeded by: Office abolished

Personal details
- Born: Clara Josephine Eißner; 5 July 1857 Wiederau, Kingdom of Saxony, German Confederation
- Died: 20 June 1933 (aged 75) Arkhangelskoye, near Moscow, Russian SFSR, Soviet Union
- Resting place: Kremlin Wall Necropolis, Moscow
- Party: SPD (1875–1917); USPD (1917–1918); KPD (1918–1933)
- Other political affiliations: Spartacus League (1914–1918)
- Spouse: Georg Friedrich Zundel (m. 1899; div. 1928)
- Domestic partner: Ossip Zetkin (died 1889)
- Children: Maxim; Konstantin
- Occupation: Politician; Peace Activist; Women's Rights Activist
- Central institution membership: 1920–1924: Full member, KPD Politburo; 1927–1929: Full member, KPD Central Committee; 1919–1924: Full member, KPD Zentrale; Other offices held: 1925–1933: Chairwoman, Rote Hilfe Deutschlands

Clara Zetkin (/ˈzɛtkɪn/; German: [ˈtsɛtkiːn]; née Eißner [ˈaɪsnɐ]; 5 July 1857 – 20 June 1933) was a German Marxist theorist, communist activist, and advocate for women's rights.

Until 1917, she was active in the Social Democratic Party of Germany. She then joined the Independent Social Democratic Party of Germany (USPD) and its far-left wing, the Spartacist League, which later became the Communist Party of Germany (KPD). She represented that party in the Reichstag during the Weimar Republic from 1920 to 1933.

== Biography ==
=== Background and education ===
In July 1857, Clara Josephine Eißner (Eissner) was born the eldest of three children in Wiederau, a peasant village in Saxony that is now part of the municipality of Königshain-Wiederau. Her father, Gottfried Eissner, was a schoolmaster, church organist and a devout Protestant. Her mother, Josephine Vitale, who had French roots, came from a middle-class family from Leipzig and was highly educated. In 1872, her family moved to Leipzig, where she was educated at the Leipzig Teachers' College for Women. There, she established contacts with the infant Sozialdemokratische Partei Deutschlands (SPD; Social Democratic Party).

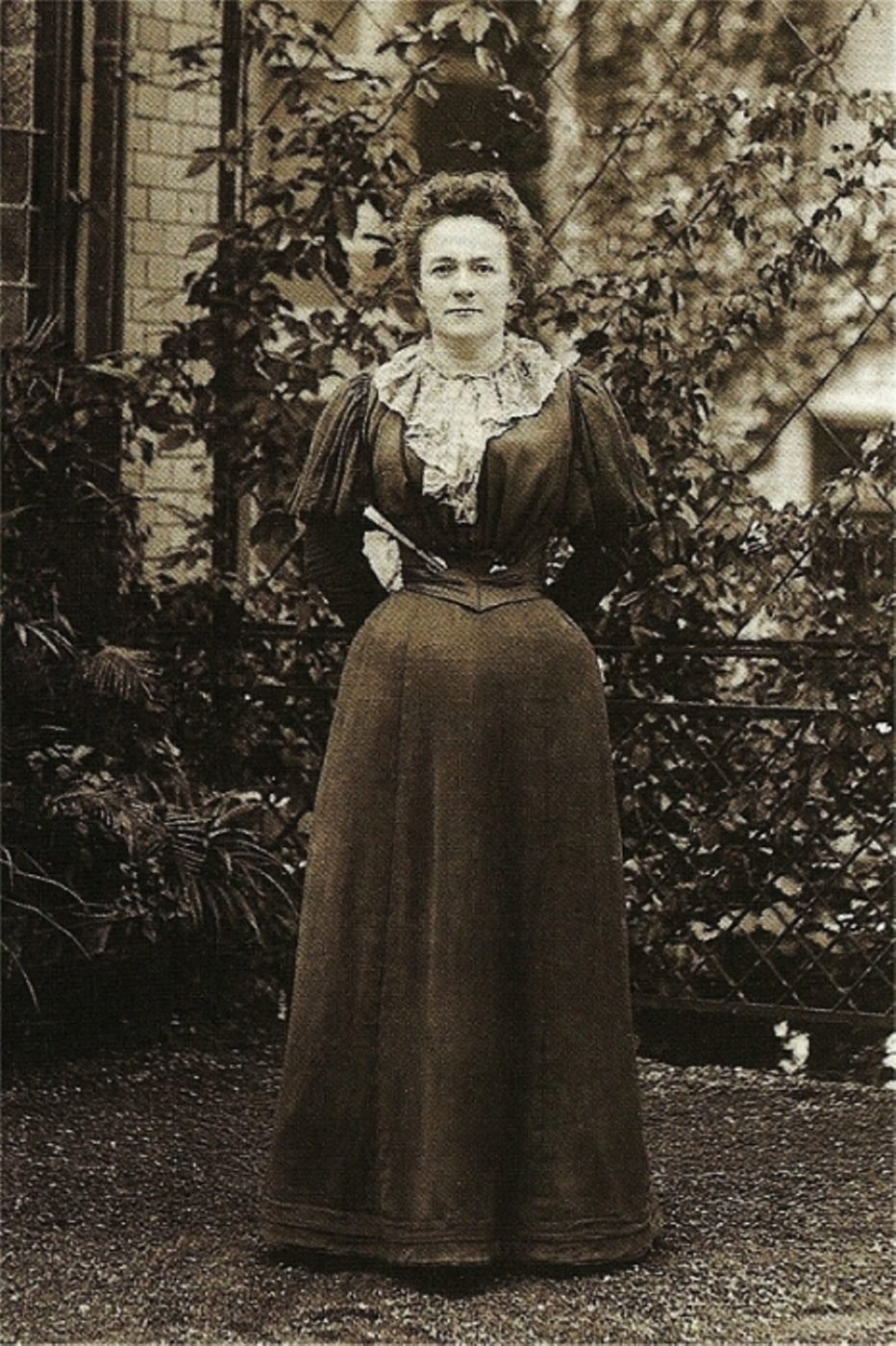
Zetkin during a congress in Zürich in 1897

Because of the ban placed on socialist activity in Germany by Otto von Bismarck in 1878, Zetkin left for Zürich in 1882 and then went into exile in Paris, where she studied to be a journalist and a translator. During her time in Paris, she played an important role in the foundation of the Socialist International group. She also adopted the name of her lover, the Russian Jewish Ossip Zetkin, a devoted Marxist, with whom she had two sons, Maxim and Konstantin (known as Kostja). Ossip Zetkin became severely ill in early 1889 and died in June of that year. After the loss of her lover, Zetkin moved to Stuttgart with her children. She married artist Georg Friedrich Zundel, who was eighteen years her junior, from 1899 to 1928.

=== Early engagement in the Social Democratic Party ===
Her political career began after being introduced to Zetkin. Within a few months of attending and taking part in socialist meetings, Zetkin became entirely committed to the party, which offered a Marxist approach to the demand for women's liberation. Around the time of 1880, due to the political climate in Germany, Zetkin went into exile in Switzerland and later in France. Upon her return to Germany, nearly a decade later, she became the editor of the Social Democratic Party of Germany's newspaper for women, Die Gleichheit (Equality), a post that she occupied for 25 years.

Having studied to become a teacher, Zetkin developed connections with the women's movement and the labour movement in Germany from 1874. In 1878 she joined the Socialist Workers' Party (Sozialistische Arbeiterpartei, SAP). This party had been founded in 1875 by merging two previous parties: the ADAV formed by Ferdinand Lassalle and the SDAP of August Bebel and Wilhelm Liebknecht. In 1890, its name was changed to its modern version Social Democratic Party of Germany (SPD).

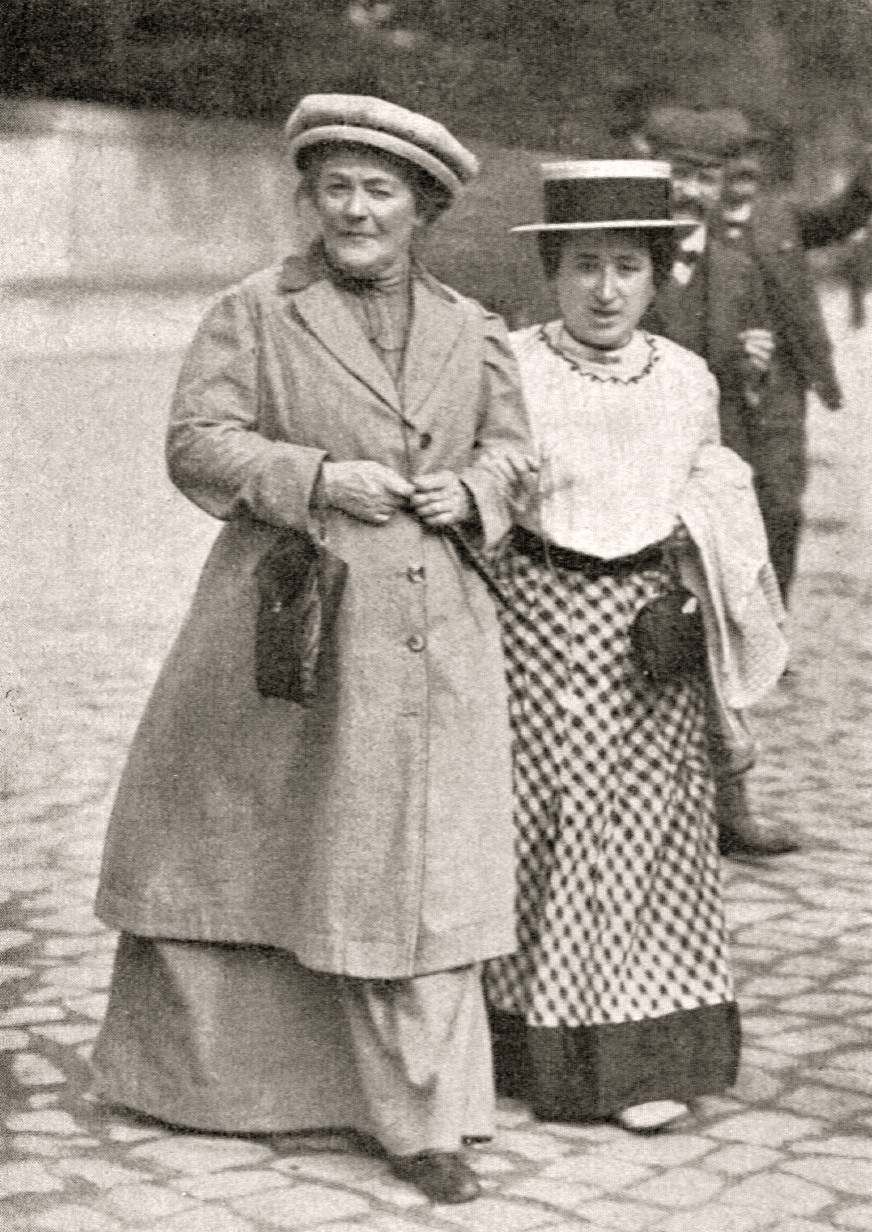
Zetkin and Rosa Luxemburg on their way to the SPD Congress in 1910

Around 1898, Zetkin formed a friendship with the younger Rosa Luxemburg that lasted 20 years. Despite Luxemburg's indifference to the women's movement, which absorbed so much of Zetkin's energies, they became firm political allies on the far left of the SPD. Luxemburg once suggested that their joint epitaph would be "Here lie the last two men of German Social Democracy". In the debate on Revisionism at the turn of the 20th century, they jointly attacked the reformist theses of Eduard Bernstein, who had rejected the ideology of a revolutionary change in favour of "evolutionary socialism".

=== Fight for women's rights ===
Zetkin was very interested in women's politics, including the fight for equal opportunities and women's suffrage, through socialism. She helped to develop the social-democratic women's movement in Germany. From 1891 to 1917, she edited the SPD women's newspaper Die Gleichheit (Note: Die Gleichheit had appeared in early 1890 as Die Arbeiterin (The Worker), a successor to the short-lived Die Staatsbürgerin (The Citizenestatic.guim.co.uk/sys-images/Guardian/Pix/pictures/2012/7/31/1343750637045/Zetkin-profile-001.jpgss) founded by Gertrud Guillaume-Schack and banned in June 1886. Zetkin renamed the paper Die Gleichheit when she took over.) (Equality). In 1907 she became the leader of the newly founded "Women's Office" at the SPD. She also contributed to International Women's Day (IWD). In August 1910, an International Women's Conference was organised to precede the general meeting of the Socialist Second International in Copenhagen, Denmark. Inspired in part by American socialists' actions, Zetkin, Käte Duncker and others proposed that "a special Women's Day" be organized annually, but no date was specified at that conference. Delegates (100 women from 17 countries) agreed with the idea as a strategy to promote suffrage for women. The following year on 19 March 1911, IWD was marked for the first time, by over a million people in Austria, Denmark, Germany, and Switzerland.

However, Zetkin was deeply opposed to the concept of "bourgeois feminism," which she claimed was a tool to divide the unity of the working classes. In a speech that she delivered to the Second International in 1889, she stated:

The working women, who aspire to social equality, expect nothing for their emancipation from the bourgeois women's movement, which allegedly fights for the rights of women. That edifice is built on sand and has no real basis. Working women are absolutely convinced that the question of the emancipation of women is not an isolated question which exists in itself, but part of the great social question. They realize perfectly clear that this question can never be solved in contemporary society, but only after a complete social transformation.

She viewed the feminist movement as being primarily composed of upper-class and middle-class women who had their own class interests in mind, which were incompatible with the interests of working-class women. Thus, feminism and the socialist fight for women's rights were incompatible. In her mind, socialism was the only way to truly end the oppression of women. One of her primary goals was to get women out of the house and into work so that they could participate in trade unions and other workers rights organizations to improve conditions for themselves. While she argued that the socialist movement should fight to achieve reforms that would lessen female oppression, she was convinced that such reforms could only prevail if they were embedded into a general move towards socialism; otherwise, they could easily be eradicated by future legislation.

She interviewed Vladimir Lenin on "The Women's Question" in 1920.

From Zetkin's perspective, the women's movement was a key component to the whole of women's rights. Not only was the movement essential to the women's rights movement, but it was also essential to building the Communist state. Lenin made it a point to mention that everyone who has been exploited or oppressed under the capitalist system should be included in the women's rights movement, further pushing the movement in Communist ideals.

Lenin and Zetkin's work as colleagues in the work of pushing the Communist and women's rights agendas progressed the liberation of women in the Soviet Union. By associating the movement with the larger proletarian revolution, they advanced the cause of women's liberation. Their combined efforts pushed for systematic changes such as labor protections, childcare facilities, women's suffrage, and dismantling the bourgeois societal norms. All of this would eventually become for naught as Stalin assumed political power in the Soviet Union, as women's reproductive health and personal liberties began to be stripped away.

=== Opposition to the First World War ===
During the period of the First World War, at the international women's peace conference in Switzerland, activists, revolutionaries, and supporters gathered to confront the concern for unity among workers across the battle lines. There, Zetkin spoke:

Who profits from this war? Only a tiny minority in each nation: The manufacturers of rifles and cannons, of armor-plate and torpedo boats, the shipyard owners and the suppliers of the armed forces' needs. In the interests of their profits, they have fanned the hatred among the people, thus contributing to the outbreak of the war. The workers have nothing to gain from this war, but they stand to lose everything that is dear to them.

Zetkin, along with Karl Liebknecht, Rosa Luxemburg, Luise Kähler and other influential SPD politicians, rejected the party's policy of Burgfrieden (a truce between political parties the government and a promise to refrain from strikes during the war). Among other anti-war activities, Zetkin organized an international socialist women's anti-war conference in Berlin in 1915. Because of her anti-war opinions, she was arrested several times during the war and was in 1916 taken into "protective custody" from which she was later released on account of illness.

=== Joining the Communist Party ===
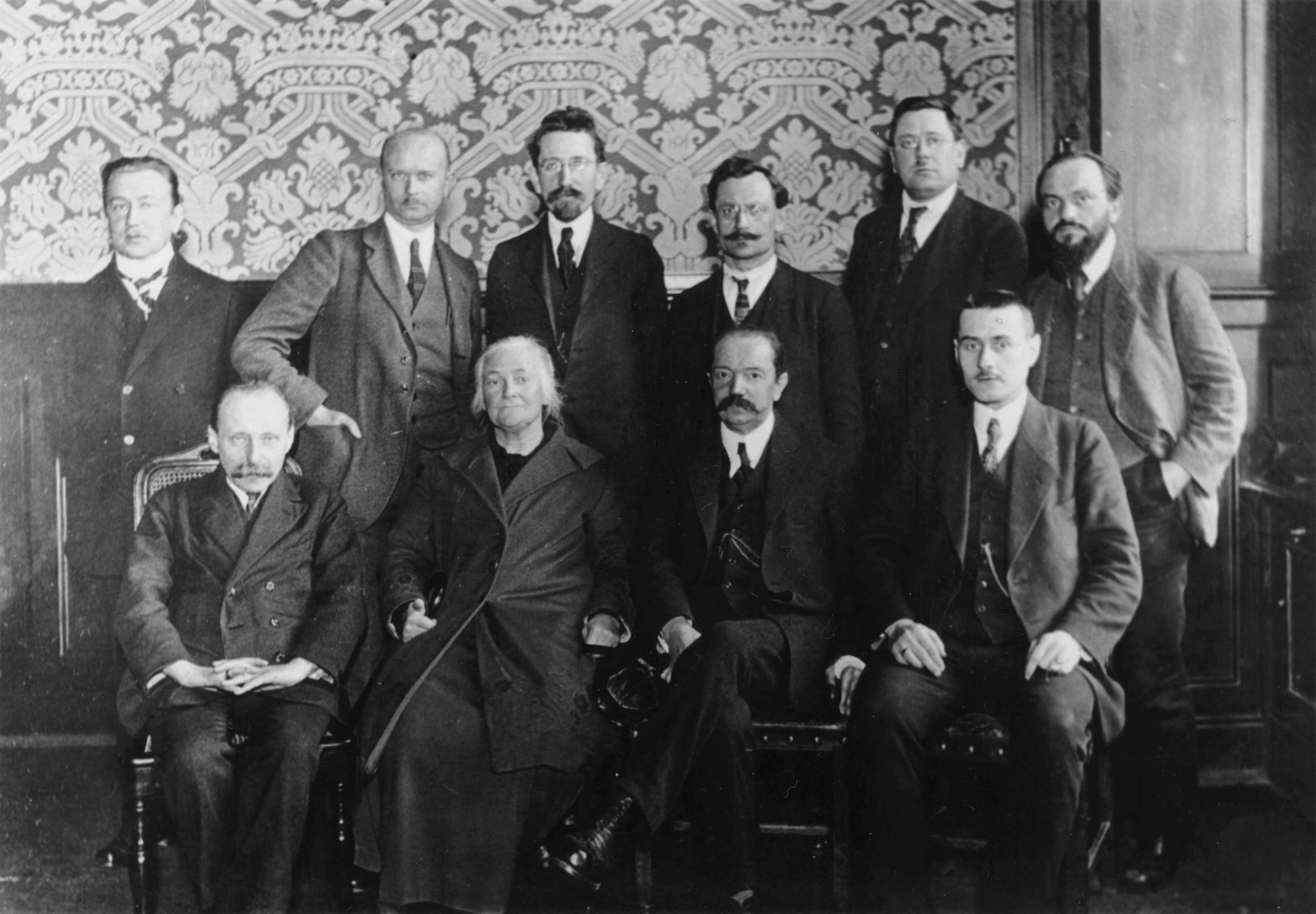
Members of the Reichstag faction of the KPD c. 1921. Sitting from left to right: Joseph Herzfeld, Clara Zetkin, Emil Eichhorn, Georg Berthelé. Standing from left to right: Max Heydemann, Walter Stoecker, Wilhelm Koenen, Wilhelm Bartz, Heinrich Malzahn, Paul Frölich.

In 1916 Zetkin was one of the co-founders of the Spartacist League and the Independent Social Democratic Party of Germany (USPD) which had split off in 1917 from its mother party, the SPD, in protest at its pro-war stance.

In January 1919, after the German Revolution in November of the previous year, the KPD (Communist Party of Germany) was founded. Zetkin also joined it and represented the party from 1920 to 1933 in the Reichstag.

Zetkin became further enveloped in the Communist movement through her interactions and fellowship with Vladimir Lenin. The relationship between Zetkin and Lenin first began in 1920 when she conducted and recorded interviews with him. In her journal entries outlining their conversations, she discussed her admiration for his leadership as he used his position of power to give a voice to the oppressed people. Three separate lifetime editions of Zetkin's memoirs about Lenin (Clara Zetkin. Memories of Lenin; Clara Zetkin. From a Notebook; Clara Zetkin. Lenin and the Masses) were included in the 5th volume of "Memories of Lenin," published by the Institute of Marxism-Leninism under the Central Committee, and became canonical for citation in the USSR. Included in speaking for the voices of the oppressed, Lenin discussed with Zetkin the need to establish an international women's movement.

From the outline of the conversations, it is apparent that Lenin respected Zetkin as a colleague who could help him implement his political strategy, not as an inferior. In addition to the conversation's rhetoric, Lenin's respect for Zetkin is evident as he employed her to establish the women's movement based on the principles of Marxist theory. Zetkin was allocated a position to provide support to the women's rights committee drafting a resolution, theses, and directives to move along the progression of the movement. Because of its previous success in bringing women's emancipation in both theory and practice, Zetkin subscribed to the socialist movement in the early 1920s.

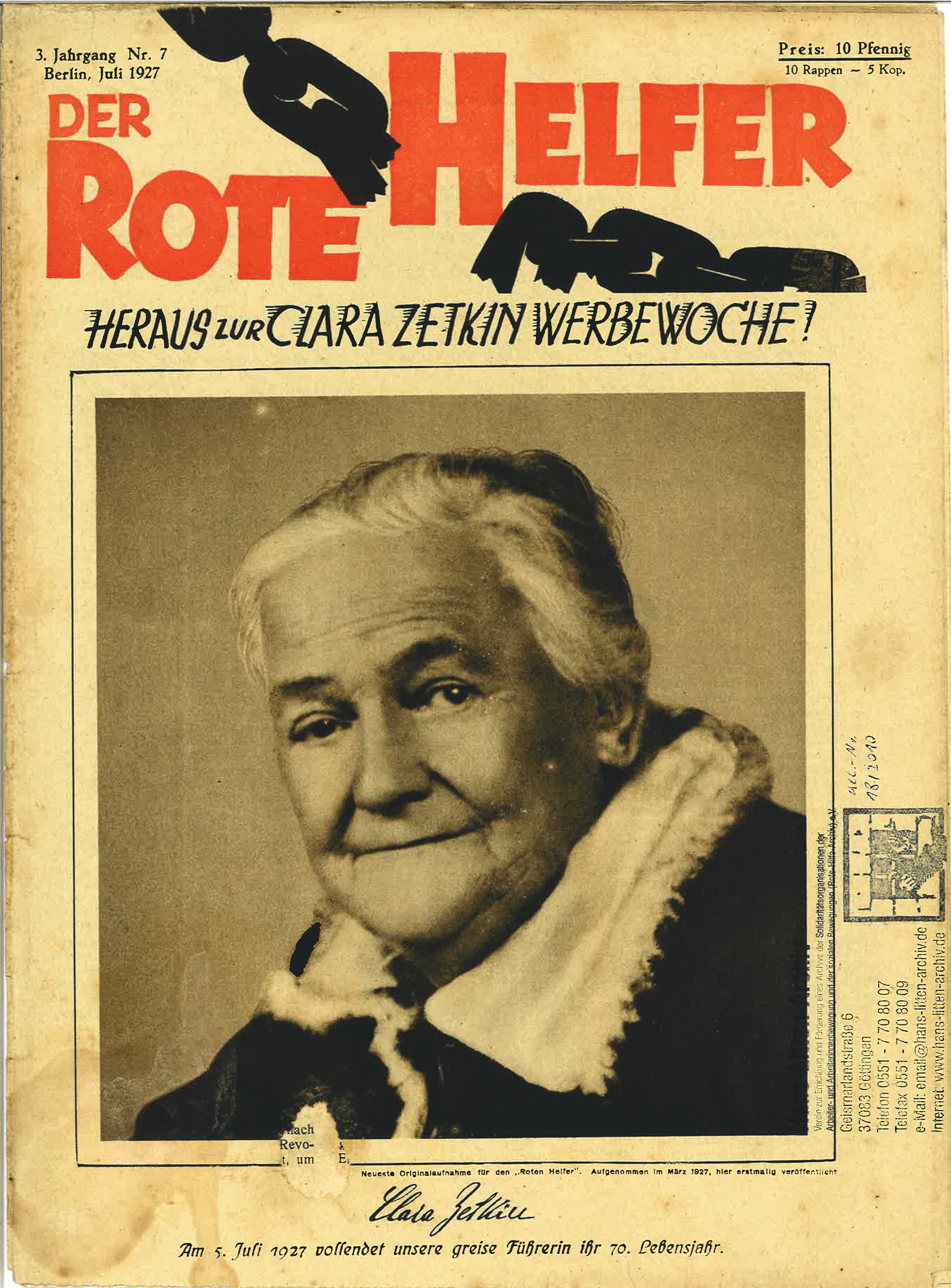
Zetkin on the cover of Der Roter Helfer, July 1927

Until 1924, Zetkin was a member of the KPD's central office. From 1927 to 1929, she was a member of the party's central committee. She was also a member of the executive committee of the Communist International (Comintern) from 1921 to 1933. She also presided over an international secretariat for women, which was created by the Communist International in October 1920. In June 1921, the Second International Conference of Communist Women, which was held in Moscow and was chaired by her, changed the date of the International Women's Day to 8 March. That has remained the date of the IWD.

In summer 1922, Zetkin was part of the prosecution team during the politically motivated propaganda Trial of the Socialist Revolutionaries in Moscow, but at other times, she was critical of Moscow's influence over the German Communist Party within which she was part of the right wing. She was removed from the Central Committee of the KPD when the left, led by Ruth Fischer, took control. She opposed a policy decision made in Moscow in 1928 to get communist trade unions in Germany to split from the main socialist-dominated federation and form the rival Rote Gewerkschaftsbund. When Joseph Stalin put this to the executive of Comintern, in December 1928, Zetkin was one of only three members of the executive to vote against.

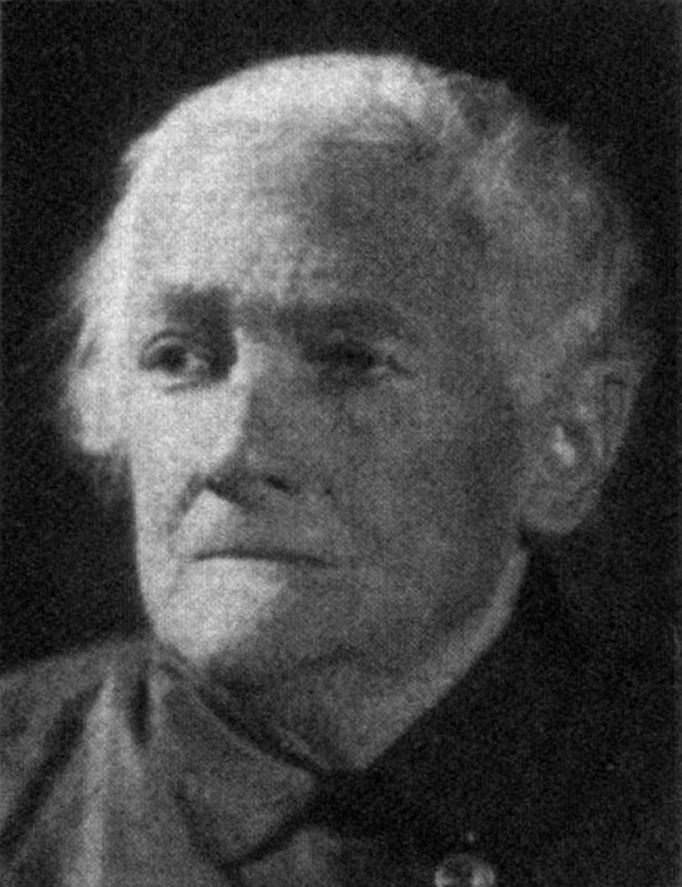
Zetkin's official Reichstag portrait, 1930

In August 1932, despite having recently fallen gravely ill in Moscow, she returned to Berlin to preside over the opening of the newly elected Reichstag, as its oldest deputy. She used her opening address to call for workers to unite in the struggle against fascism:

The most important immediate task is the formation of a United Front of all workers in order to turn back fascism [..] in order to preserve for the enslaved and exploited, the force and power of their organization as well as to maintain their own physical existence. Before this compelling historical necessity, all inhibiting and dividing political, trade union, religious and ideological opinions must take a back seat. All those who feel themselves threatened, all those who suffer and all those who long for liberation must belong to the United Front against fascism and its representatives in government.

She was a recipient of the Order of Lenin (1932) and the Order of the Red Banner (1927).

=== Publications ===
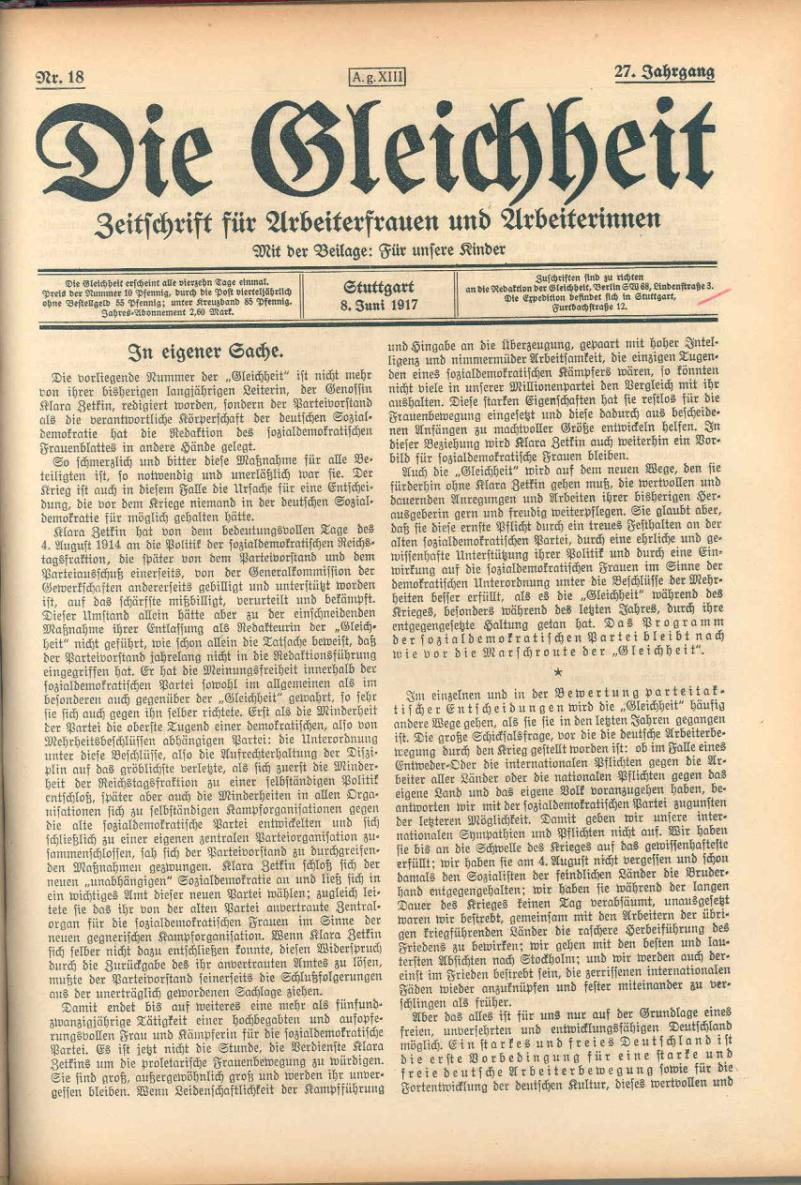
An example of a cover page of Die Gleichheit edited by Clara Zetkin from 1892 to 1917.

Zetkin's literary involvement began in 1892 when she started editing and writing for the SDP women's newspaper, Die Gleichheit, which translates to Equality. Originally, the newspaper was titled Die Arbeiterin (The Woman Worker), however, its publications received little success. She edited this newspaper until 1917. Her publications aimed at mobilizing the female working class, which included workers and mothers, to adopt socialism and feminism. Which might seem contrary to Zetkin's adamant protest of being called a feminist. The topics covered ranged from female worker strikes in Germany, women's suffrage, and child labor. Under Zetkin's leadership, the newspaper grew forty-fold by 1910.

In 1921, Clara Zetkin began to write for the communist periodical, Die Kommunistische Fraueninternationale. Her purpose in writing for the periodical was to convince women of the effectiveness of socialist reform thinking over capitalist thought. The published periodicals expanded globally and became a forum for communist women to hear about the lives of other communists. The periodical focused on the lives of women in Russia, which had experienced a successful communist revolution. As Zetkin subscribed to the communist model of reform, her writings continued to outline and advocate for women to join her in her adherence. Of the periodicals Zetkin produced and edited for, Die Kommunistische Fraueninternationale most accurately portrayed her actual worldviews. The periodical rejected "bourgeois feminism" (a position consistent with Zetkin's views) and advocated for women to become workers in the proletarian state.

Zetkin's published works began to be stalled during the rise of the Stalinist government in the early 1920s. Stalin's politics stunted and regressed much of the progress of the women's movement in the Soviet Union, returning the country to be based in conservative ideals. The May-June 1925 issue of Die Kommunistische Fraueninternationale was the last issue to ever be published. This was an appendage to the decision to move the International Women's Secretariat from Berlin back to Moscow. By April 1926, the International Women's Secretariat lost its independence and became absorbed into the Women's Section of the Comintern Executive. The rise of Stalin's bureaucracy in the Soviet Union dissolved the relationship the women's movement established with the government under the leadership of Lenin.

=== Exile and death ===
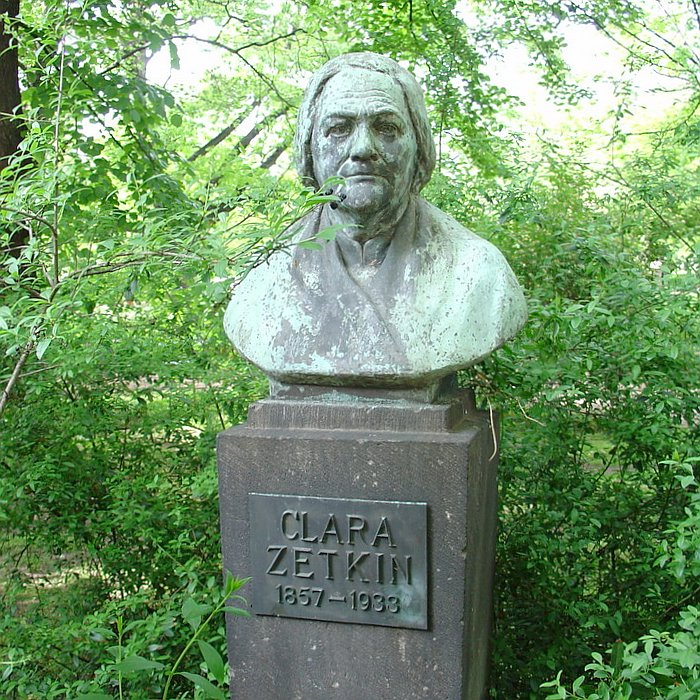
Memorial bust of Clara Zetkin in Dresden

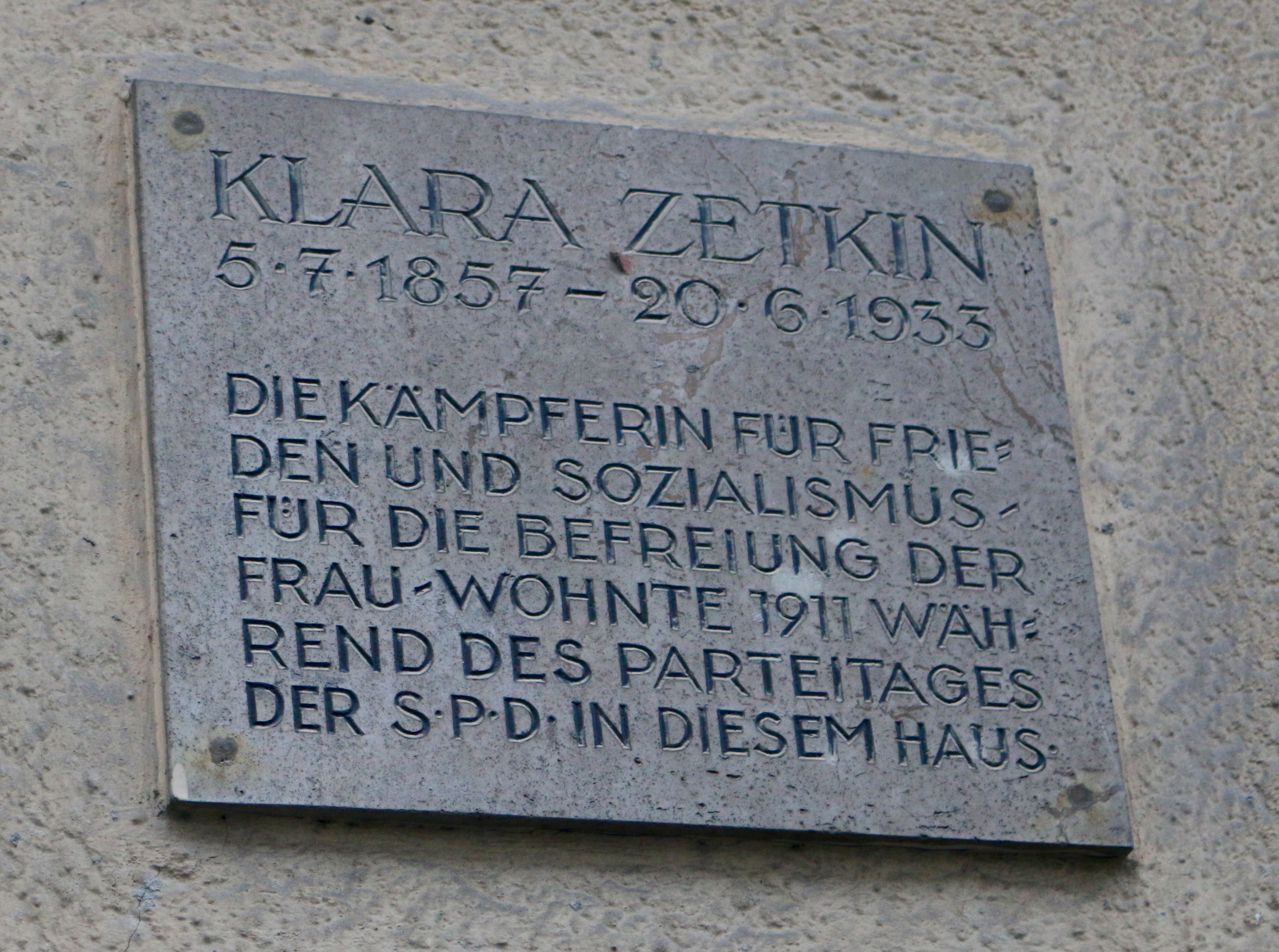
A plaque commemorating where Clara Zetkin once lived in Jena

Soon after Adolf Hitler and his Nazi Party took power in 1933, the Reichstag fire gave the Nazi government opportunity to outright ban the KPD and other dissenting political parties. Zetkin went into exile for the last time, this time to the Soviet Union. She died there, at Arkhangelskoye, near Moscow, in 1933, aged nearly 76. Her ashes were placed in the Kremlin Wall Necropolis, by the Moscow Kremlin Wall, near the Red Square. The funeral was attended by leading communists from all over Europe, including Joseph Stalin and Nadezhda Krupskaya (Lenin's widow).

=== Legacy ===
In the decade following her exile and death, Zetkin's legacy had been largely forgotten. There appeared to be a negative connotation associated with her name as political figures, even Stalin, labeled her as an ‘old witch.’ Attempts had been made to renounce International Women's Day in post-war West Germany, one of the highlights of Zetkin's political career. The demonstration on March 8th was heralded as 'an event of the devil' by some.

After 1949, Zetkin became a much-celebrated person in the German Democratic Republic (East Germany), and every major city had a street named after her. A street in Tula, Russia, named for Zetkin (ул. Клары Цеткин) as well as a street in Belgrade, Serbia (ul. Klare Cetkin).

In 1994, Christian Democrat Chancellor Helmut Kohl, argued against continuing to name a street near the Reichstag in Berlin after Zetkin because he regarded her as a leading representative of an anti-constitutional movement which sought to replace the Weimar parliamentary system with a communist state.

Her legacy was further tarnished because her works were unpalatable to the feminist movements of the 60s and 70s. In 1960s and 70s Europe, Western Europe began its transition into second-wave feminist ideologies. As second-wave feminist ideologies took hold, a direct consequence was the exclusion of men from participation in women's movements. This is contrary to Zetkin's philosophy of the need for men and women within the working class to work together to achieve women's liberation.

Today, many authors attempt to attribute Zetkin's work under the categories of "socialist feminism" or "Marxist feminism." However, during her lifespan, the term "socialist feminism" did not exist. In analyzing her published works, the term "Frauenrechtlerei" has been mistakenly translated as "feminist" or "feminism." In its truest translations, however, the term was used in demeaning rhetoric to separate Zetkin's political efforts from the bourgeois feminists.

Her son, Maxim Zetkin, a medical doctor, continued her legacy of Communist leadership. In the 1920s, Maxim joined Clara in attending several Comintern congresses and worked for a number of Comintern missions. Maxim eventually joined the Soviet Communist Party after being commissioned to practice surgery in Moscow.

== Posthumous honors ==
- Zetkin was memorialized on the ten mark banknote and twenty mark coin of the German Democratic Republic (GDR) (East Germany).
- After 1949, every major city in the GDR had a street named after her.
- In 1954, the GDR established the Clara Zetkin Medal (Clara-Zetkin-Medaille).
- In 1955, the city council of Leipzig established a new recreation area near the city center called "Clara-Zetkin-Park"
- In 1967, a statue of Clara Zetkin, sculpted by GDR artist Walter Arnold, was erected in Johannapark, Leipzig in commemoration of her 110th birthday.
- In 1987, the GDR issued a stamp with her picture.
- Since 2011, the German party Die Linke issues an annual "Clara-Zetkin-Frauenpreis".
- There is also a street named after Clara Zetkin in the city of Tula, Russia, which is located near the intersection of Leyteyzena Street and Red Army Prospect. (Red Army Prospect is a major thoroughfare In Tula which leads to the main train station.)

== See also ==
- List of peace activists
- Alexandra Kollontai
- Nadezhda Krupskaya
- Rosa Luxemburg
- Alexander Deubner

== Sources ==
- Mutert, Susanne (1996). "Femmes et syndicats en Bavière". Métiers, corporations, syndicalismes (in French). Presses Univ. du Mirail. ISBN 978-2-85816-289-5.
