= Kunsthalle Tübingen =

Coordinates: 48°32′31″N 9°02′52″E

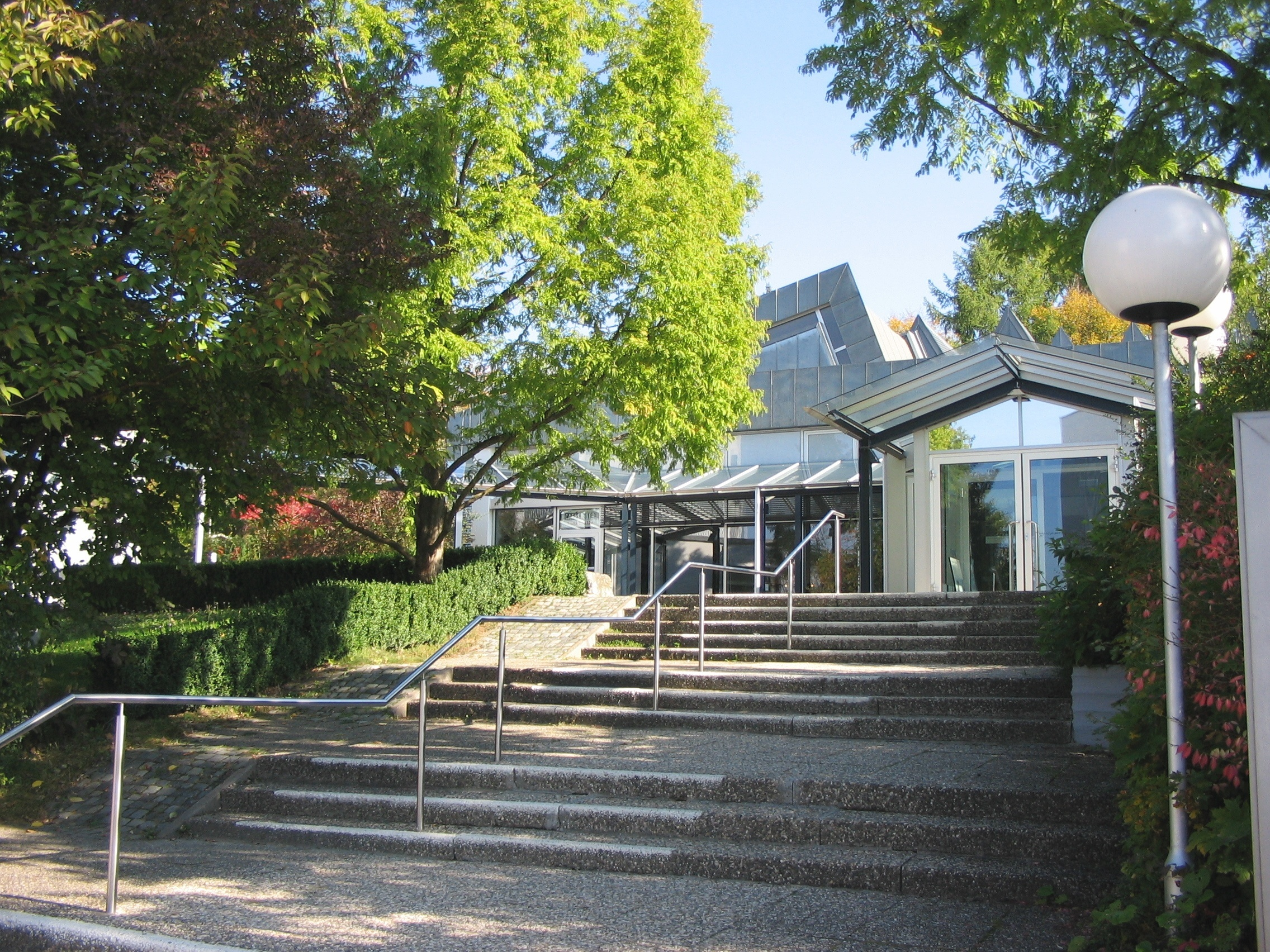
- Established: 1971
- Location: Tübingen, Baden-Württemberg, Germany
- Type: Art museum

Kunsthalle Tübingen is an art museum in the university town of Tübingen, Baden-Württemberg, Germany.

It was founded (and the erection of its building financed) in 1971 by Paula Zundel and Dr. Margarethe Fischer-Bosch, daughters of the industrialist Robert Bosch (founder of Robert Bosch GmbH) in memory of painter Georg Friedrich Zundel, Paula Zundel's late husband.

The building was erected during the big northern expansion of Tübingen in the 1960s and early 1970s, when the Wanne district (a.o.) was built almost from scratch as a residential area on the town's (formerly) rural northern hills.

For the first eleven years of its existence, it hosted mainly exhibitions of modern art and contemporary art. From 1982, it also frequently presented the works of painters of the classical modernity, e.g. Cézanne, Degas, Picasso, Renoir, Toulouse-Lautrec or Henri Rousseau, while keeping up the focus on modern art and contemporary art.

The first director of the Kunsthalle and, so far, for most of its existence, was Götz Adriani, from 1971 to 2005. His main theme was the leading role of the 19th century and early 20th-century French art for international modernity. Adriani managed to organize the first exhibitions in Germany of the works many of the French painters of the period of the late 19th and early 20th centuries at the Kunsthalle Tübingen. As for contemporary art, he was helpful in promoting the careers of artists such as George Segal (1972), Richard Hamilton (1974), and Claes Oldenburg (1975).

From 2006 to 2009, Martin Hellmond was the director at Kunsthalle. The current director (curator) is Dr. Nicole Fritz.

Since 2003, the museum is financed by a charitable non-profit foundation (before, it had been an institution of the city of Tübingen), consisting of private donations and the money of the Zundel family.
