= Götz Adriani =

German art historian, museum director (b. 1940)

Götz Adriani (born 21 November 1940) is a German art historian, art conservator, and art museum director. He worked at Kunsthalle Tübingen, and directed the Museum of Contemporary Art at the ZKM Center for Art and Media Karlsruhe.

== Biography ==
Götz Adriani was born on 21 November 1940 in Stuttgart, the son of an art historian (Gert Adriani). He studied history of art, archaeology and history at LMU Munich, the University of Vienna, and the University of Tübingen, earning a doctorate in 1964 on the topic of the design of medieval places of sermon. After working for some years as a conservator in Darmstadt, Adriani became the director of the newly founded Kunsthalle in Tübingen, the town of his last alma mater, in 1971.

In his more than 30 years at the Kunsthalle (1971 to 2005), he made it one of the most prestigious museums, especially for modern and contemporary art, in Germany.

== Honours ==
Since 1985, Adriani holds the title of an honorary professor at the State Academy of Fine Arts in Karlsruhe.

Adriani received some of the highest French orders of merit in the field of arts: the Ordre des Palmes Académiques in 1985 and the Ordre des Arts et des Lettres in the late 1990s.

In 2001, he received the highest Order of Merit of the State of Baden-Württemberg, in 2008 the Order of Merit of the Federal Republic of Germany (Officer's Cross).

In 2012, he became honorary citizen of Tübingen.

== Published works ==
He published books on Joseph Beuys (1994), Paul Cézanne (1982 and 2006), Auguste Renoir (1988), Henri de Toulouse-Lautrec (1987) and Junge Wilde (2003).
