= List of biographers =

Biographers are authors who write an account of another person's life, while autobiographers are authors who write their own biography.

== Biographers ==
Countries of working life: Ab=Arabia, AG=Ancient Greece, Al=Australia, Alb= Albania, Am=Armenia, AR=Ancient Rome, Au=Austria, AH=Austria/Hungary, Ca=Canada, Eg=Egypt, En=England, Fl=Finland, Fr=France, Ge=Germany, Gr=Greece, Id=Indonesia, In=India, Ir=Ireland, Is=Israel, It=Italy, Jp=Japan, Nw=Norway, Ru=Russia, SA=South Africa, Sc=Scotland, SL=Sierra Leone, So=Somalia, Sp=Spain, Sw=Sweden, TT=Trinidad & Tobago, US=United States, Ve=Venezuela, Wl=Wales

=== A–C ===
- Hermann Abert (Ge, 1871–1927) – Niccolò Jommelli, Wolfgang Amadeus Mozart and Robert Schumann
- Gino Agnese (It, 1936–2026) – Umberto Boccioni and Filippo Tommaso Marinetti
- Alfred Ainger (En, 1837–1904) – Charles Lamb
- Gëzim Alpion (Alb/En) – Mother Teresa
- Ellis Amburn (US, 1933–2018) – Warren Beatty, Buddy Holly, Janis Joplin, Jack Kerouac, Roy Orbison and Elizabeth Taylor
- Rudolph Angermüller (Ge, 1940–2021) – Antonio Salieri and Wolfgang Amadeus Mozart
- Núria Añó (Sp, born 1973) – Salka Viertel
- Marie Célestine Amélie d'Armaillé (Fr, 1830–1918) – Catherine de Bourbon, Élisabeth of France, Marie Leszczyńska, Marie Antoinette, Marie-Thérèse, Duchess of Angoulême, Septimanie d'Egmont, Désirée Clary
- Margaret Aston (En, 1932–2014) – Thomas Arundel
- Rosemary Ashton (Sc/En, born 1947) – George Eliot
- Aaron Badgley (Ca, living) – George Harrison and Ringo Starr
- Anne Baker (En, 1914–2025) – Florence Baker, Valentine Baker and Geoffrey Salmond
- Deborah Baker (US, living) – Allen Ginsberg and Laura Riding
- Jean-Claude Baker (Fr/US, 1943–2015) and Chris Chase (US, 1924–2013) – Josephine Baker
- David Baldwin (En, 1946– 2016) – Katherine Brandon, Duchess of Suffolk, Richard III of England, Elizabeth Woodville and Richard of Shrewsbury, Duke of York
- Lady Frances Balfour (En, 1858–1931) – Elsie Inglis and Lady Victoria Campbell
- Lois Banner (US, born 1939) – Ruth Benedict, Greta Garbo, Marilyn Monroe and Elizabeth Cady Stanton
- Angelica Bäumer (Au, 1932–2025) – Soshana Afroyim, Gustav Klimt and Erich Lessing
- Mary Benson (SA, 1919–2000) – Tshekedi Khama, Albert Luthuli and Nelson Mandela
- Mary Matilda Betham (En, 1776–1852) – Caroline of Brunswick
- Elizabeth Biddulph, Baroness Biddulph (En, 1834–1916) – Charles Yorke, 4th Earl of Hardwicke
- Jennie M. Bingham (US, 1859–1933) – Anthony Ashley-Cooper, 7th Earl of Shaftesbury, Charlotte Brontë, Margaret Fuller, Charles Lamb and Briton Rivière
- Evangeline Wilbour Blashfield (US, 1858–1918) – Aphra Behn, Charlotte Aïssé, Rosalba Carriera, Gerberga II, Abbess of Gandersheim and Hrotsvitha
- Lucie Boissonnas (Fr, 1839–1877) – Robert E. Lee
- Martin Bommas (Ge/Eg, born 1967) – Tutankhamun
- Charlotte Booth (En/Eg, born 1975) – Horemheb, Hypatia and Tutankhamun
- James Boswell (Sc, 1740–1795) – Samuel Johnson
- Peter Bourne (En, born 1939) – Jimmy Carter and Fidel Castro
- Catherine Drinker Bowen (US, 1897–1973) – Edward Coke, Benjamin Franklin and Oliver Wendell Holmes Jr.
- Paula Broadwell (US, born 1972) – David Petraeus
- Sarah Bradford (En, born 1938) – Cesare Borgia, Lucrezia Borgia, Diana, Princess of Wales, Elizabeth II, George VI, Grace Kelly, Jacqueline Kennedy Onassis and Sacheverell Sitwell
- David W. Blight (US, born 1949) – Frederick Douglass
- Max Brod (AH/Is, 1884–1968) – Franz Kafka
- Leslie Brody (US, born 1952) – Jessica Mitford
- Vincent Brome (En, 1910–2004) – Clement Attlee, Aneurin Bevan, Frank Harris and H. G. Wells
- Brigid Brophy (1929–1995) – Aubrey Beardsley, Ronald Firbank, Grigory Gagarin and Wolfgang Amadeus Mozart
- Andrea Cagan (US, living) – Diana Ross
- Thomas Carlyle (Sc, 1795–1881) – Frederick the Great and John Sterling
- Robert A. Caro (US, born 1935) – Robert Moses and Lyndon B. Johnson
- Humphrey Carpenter (En, 1946–2005) – W. H. Auden, Benjamin Britten, Spike Milligan, Ezra Pound, Robert Runcie, J. R. R. Tolkien and Evelyn Waugh
- Virginia Spencer Carr (US, 1929–2012) – Paul Bowles, Carson McCullers and John Dos Passos
- David C. Cassidy (US, born 1945) – Albert Einstein, Mileva Marić and J. Robert Oppenheimer
- Charles Castle (En, 1939–2013) – Noël Coward, Joan Crawford, Oliver Messel, Margaret, Duchess of Argyll, La Belle Otero and Richard Tauber
- George Cavendish (En, 1494 – c. 1562) – Thomas Wolsey
- Nirad C. Chaudhuri (In, 1897–1999) – Clive of India and Max Müller
- Ron Chernow (US, born 1949) – Alexander Hamilton
- Pasquale Chessa (It, born 1947) – Benito Mussolini
- Na Chokkan (In, born 1977) – Sachin Tendulkar, Dhirubhai Ambani, Charlie Chaplin, Rahul Dravid, Azim Premji, Lakshmi Mittal, Walt Disney etc. in Tamil
- Heather Clark (US, living) – Ted Hughes and Sylvia Plath
- John Henrik Clarke (US, 1915–1998) – Ahmad Baba al-Timbukti, Marcus Garvey and Malcolm X
- Claude Clegg (US, living) – Elijah Muhammad
- Vincent Cronin (En, 1924–2011) – Napoleon, Louis XVI, Marie Antoinette and Catherine the Great
- Anne de Courcy (En, born 1927) – Antony Armstrong-Jones, 1st Earl of Snowdon, Margot Asquith, Coco Chanel, Nancy Cunard, Irene Curzon, 2nd Baroness Ravensdale, Lady Alexandra Metcalfe, Lady Cynthia Mosley, Diana Mosley and Edith Vane-Tempest-Stewart, Marchioness of Londonderry
- Maud Cruttwell (En, 1859 – 1939) – Donatello, Andrea Mantegna and Luca Signorelli

=== D–G ===
- Douglas Day (US, 1932–2004) – Malcolm Lowry
- Mahasweta Devi (In, 1926–2016) – Rani of Jhansi
- Thomas DiLorenzo (US, born 1954) – Abraham Lincoln
- Damon DiMarco (US, born 1971) – Roy Simmons
- Rebecca Donner (US) – Mildred Harnack
- Helen Dukas (Ge, 1896–1982) – Albert Einstein
- Erica Armstrong Dunbar (US) – Harriet Tubman
- Jonathan Eig (US, 1964) – Muhammad Ali, Martin Luther King Jr. and Jackie Robinson
- Richard Ellmann (US, 1918–1987) – James Joyce, Oscar Wilde and W. B. Yeats
- Marthe Emmanuel (France, 1901–1997) – Jean-Baptiste Charcot and Robert Falcon Scott
- Hélène Carrère d'Encausse (Fr, 1929–2023) – Vladimir Lenin and Alexandra Kollontai
- Alberthiene Endah (Id, living) – Chrisye, Krisdayanti and Raam Punjabi
- Ivar Eskeland (Nw, 1927–2005) – Gisle Straume and Snorri Sturluson
- Wayne Federman (US, born 1959) – Pete Maravich
- Elaine Feinstein (En, 1930–2019) – Marina Tsvetaeva, Alexander Pushkin and Ted Hughes
- Mary Fels (US, 1863–1953) – Joseph Fels
- Kitty Ferguson (US, born 1941) – Stephen Hawking
- William Fitzstephen (En, died 1190) – Thomas Becket
- Sarah Foot (En, born 1961) – Æthelstan
- Amanda Foreman (En/US, born 1968) – Georgiana Cavendish, Duchess of Devonshire
- Esther G. Frame (US, 1840–1920) – Esther G. Frame
- Antonia Fraser (En, born 1932) – Marie Antoinette, Oliver Cromwell, Caroline Lamb, Caroline Norton and Mary, Queen of Scots
- Russell Freedman (US, 1929–2018) – Abraham Lincoln
- Douglas Southall Freeman (US, 1886–1953) – Robert E. Lee and George Washington
- Leonie Frieda (Sw/En, born 1956) – Catherine de' Medici
- Gabriele Fritsch-Vivié (Gr, born 1968) – Kurt Singer and Mary Wigman
- Paul Frölich (Ge, 1884–1953) – Rosa Luxemburg
- Jean Overton Fuller (En, 1915–2009) – Sir Francis Bacon, Noor-un-nisa Inayat Khan, Percy Bysshe Shelley and Algernon Charles Swinburne
- Elizabeth Gaskell (En, 1810–1865) – Charlotte Brontë
- Peter Gay (US, 1923–2015) – Sigmund Freud and Wolfgang Amadeus Mozart
- Gary Giddins (US, born 1948) – Louis Armstrong, Bing Crosby and Charlie Parker
- Martin Gilbert (En, 1936–2015) – Winston Churchill
- Annie Somers Gilchrist (US, 1841–1912) – Some representative women of Tennessee
- Marcia Ann Gillespie (US, born 1944) – Maya Angelou
- Josef Greiner (Au, c. 1886–1947) – Adolf Hitler
- Adrian Greenwood (En, 1973–2016) – Colin Campbell, 1st Baron Clyde
- Germaine Greer (En, born 1939) – Anne Hathaway
- Teresa, Contessa Guiccioli (It, 1800–1873) – Lord Byron
- Peter Guralnick (US, born 1943) – Elvis Presley and Sam Phillips
- Ramachandra Guha (In, born 1958) – Verrier Elwin and Mahatma Gandhi

=== H–M ===
- Syeda Hameed (In, born 1943) – Khwaja Ahmad Abbas, Maulana Azad and Zakir Husain
- Jane Sherron De Hart (US, born 1936) – Ruth Bader Ginsburg
- James Haskins (US) – Lena Horne, Scott Joplin, Rosa Parks, Pelé, Bill Robinson, Stevie Wonder and James Van Der Zee
- Zahi Hawass (Eg, born 1947) – Cleopatra, Ramesses II and Tutankhamun
- Seppo Heikinheimo (Fl, 1938–1997) – Aarre Merikanto, Oskar Merikanto and Martti Talvela
- Carolyn Gold Heilbrun (US, 1926–2003) – Lady Ottoline Morrell and Gloria Steinem
- Robert Hemenway (US, 1941–2015) – Zora Neale Hurston
- Hayden Herrera (US, born 1940) – Frida Kahlo
- Charles Higham (En/US, 1931–2012) – Errol Flynn, Howard Hughes and Katharine Hepburn
- Laura Hillenbrand (US, born 1967) – Louis Zamperini
- Thomas Jefferson Hogg (En, 1792–1862) – Percy Bysshe Shelley
- Richard Holmes (En, born 1945) – Mary Shelley and Samuel Taylor Coleridge
- Michael Holroyd (En, born 1935) – Lytton Strachey
- Imogen Holst (En, 1907–1984) – Gustav Holst
- Erik Hornung (Ge/Eg, 1933–2022) – Akhenaten and Seti I
- Louise Seymour Houghton (1838–1920) – David Livingstone
- Marilla Baker Ingalls (US, 1828–1902) – Mah Po
- Walter Isaacson (US, born 1952) – Benjamin Franklin, Steve Jobs and Henry Kissinger
- Edward Jablonski (US, 1922–2004) – George Gershwin and Irving Berlin
- Elizabeth Jenkins (En, 1905–2010) – Jane Austen, Henry Fielding, Lady Caroline Lamb Joseph Lister and Elizabeth I
- Samuel Johnson (En, 1709–1784) – Lives of the Most Eminent English Poets
- Ernest Jones (Wl, 1879–1958) – Sigmund Freud
- Kathleen Jones (En/Al, born 1946) – Katherine Mansfield
- Landon Jones (US, living) – William Clark
- Alicia Jurado (Arg, 1922–2011) – William Henry Hudson, Cunninghame Graham, Jorge Luis Borges
- Yvonne Kapp (En, 1903–1999) – Eleanor Marx
- Shakuntala Karandikar (In, 1931–2018) – Chandrashekhar Agashe
- Lutis Abd Al Karim (Eg) – Farida of Egypt, Ihsan Abdel Quddous and Mohammed Abdel Wahab
- Kitty Kelley (US, born 1942) – Frank Sinatra, Elizabeth Taylor and Nancy Reagan
- Jacqueline Kent (Al, born 1947) – Kenneth Cook, Beatrice Davis, Julia Gillard and Hephzibah Menuhin
- Harriette A. Keyser (US, 1841–1936) – Henry C. Potter
- Jennie Ellis Keysor (US, 1860–1945) – Raphael
- Marvin Kitman (US, 1929–2023) – George Washington and Bill O'Reilly
- Edward Klein (US, born 1937) – Hillary Clinton
- Vera Krasovskaya (Ru, 1915–1999) – Vakhtang Chabukiani, Nikita Dolgushin, Natalia Dudinskaya, Michel Fokine, Irina Kolpakova, Vaslav Nijinsky and Anna Pavlova
- Brooke Kroeger (US, living) – Nellie Bly and Fannie Hurst
- Robert Lacey (En, born 1944) – Elizabeth II, Princess Grace, Henry VIII, Henry Ford and Robert Devereux, 2nd Earl of Essex
- Jane Lane (En, 1905–1978) – Titus Oates
- Joseph P. Lash (US, 1909–1987) – Helen Keller and Eleanor Roosevelt
- Linda Lear (US, born 1940) – Beatrix Potter
- David Leavitt (US, born 1961) – Alan Turing
- Hermione Lee (En, born 1948) – Edith Wharton, Virginia Woolf
- Sidney Lee (En, 1856–1926) – Dictionary of National Biography, William Shakespeare and Queen Victoria
- J. Michael Lennon (US, born 1942) – Norman Mailer
- Gerda Lerner (US, 1920–2013) – Angelina Grimké and Sarah Moore Grimké
- Santeri Levas (Fl, 1899–1987) – Clara & Robert Schumann, Jean Sibelius
- Barbara Levick (En, 1931–2023) – specialising in Roman emperors
- Gail Levin (US, born 1948) – Edward Hopper, Judy Chicago and Lee Krasner
- Roger Lewis (Wl, born 1960) – Anthony Burgess
- Martha D. Lincoln (US, 1838–1911) – John Wesley Powell
- Emil Ludwig (Ge, 1881–1948) – Otto von Bismarck, Johann Wolfgang von Goethe, William Lyon Mackenzie King, Napoleon and Wilhelm II
- Kenneth S. Lynn (US, 1923–2001) – Mark Twain, Charlie Chaplin and Ernest Hemingway
- Brenda Maddox (US/E, 1932–2019) – Elizabeth Taylor, D. H. Lawrence, Nora Joyce, W. B. Yeats and Rosalind Franklin
- Norman Mailer (US, 1923–2007) – Marilyn Monroe, Lee Harvey Oswald and Gary Gilmore
- Koryun (Am, 5th century) – Mesrop Mashtots
- William Manchester (US, 1922–2004) – Winston Churchill, Douglas MacArthur and John F. Kennedy
- Cristina Marcano (Ve, born 1960) – Hugo Chávez
- Bruce Marshall (Sc, 1899–1987) – Wing Commander F. F. E. Yeo-Thomas
- Georgina Masson (1912–1980) – Frederick II, Holy Roman Emperor and Christina, Queen of Sweden
- John Matteson (US, born 1961) – Amos Bronson Alcott, Louisa May Alcott and Margaret Fuller
- Rosaline Masson (En, 1867–1949) – William Edmondstoune Aytoun, Robert Pollok, Robert Louis Stevenson and William Wordsworth
- André Maurois (Fr, 1885–1967) – Percy Bysshe Shelley, Lord Byron, Benjamin Disraeli, Victor Hugo, Balzac and Sir Alexander Fleming
- Dorothy Moulton Mayer (En, 1886–1974) – Marie Antoinette, Angelica Kauffman, Louise of Savoy and Louis Spohr
- David McCullough (US, 1933–2022) – Harry S. Truman, John Adams and Theodore Roosevelt
- Jimmy McDonough (US, born 1959) – Neil Young, Andy Milligan, Russ Meyer, Tammy Wynette
- Martin Meredith (En, born 1942) – Bram Fischer, Nelson Mandela and Robert Mugabe
- Marguerite Merington (US, 1857–1951) – Edwin Booth and George Armstrong Custer
- Merle Miller (US, 1919–1986) – Harry S. Truman and Lyndon B. Johnson
- James McGrath Morris (US, born 1954) – Joseph Pulitzer, Charles Chapin, Ethel Payne, Ernest Hemingway, John Dos Passos
- Miyoshi Kiyotsura (Jp, 847–918) – Japanese scholar-statesman
- Ibn al-Qaisarani (Ab, 1056–1113) – medieval Arab biographer of previous medieval biographers
- Ingeborg Møller (Nw, 1878–1964) – Henrik Steffens
- Simon Sebag Montefiore (En, born 1965) – Catherine the Great, Grigory Potemkin and Joseph Stalin
- Thomas Moore (Ir, 1779–1852) – Richard Brinsley Sheridan, Lord Byron and Lord Edward FitzGerald
- Jeffrey Morgan (Ca, living) – Alice Cooper and The Stooges
- Ted Morgan (US, 1932–2023) – William S. Burroughs, W. Somerset Maugham and Franklin D. Roosevelt
- Muriel Earhart Morrissey (US, 1899–1998) – Amelia Earhart
- Andrew Morton (En, born 1953) – Princess Diana, Monica Lewinsky and Tom Cruise
- Malcolm Muggeridge (En, 1903–1990) – Samuel Butler, Mother Teresa and Sydney Smith

=== N–R ===
- Ira Nadel (Ca, born 1943) – Leon Uris, David Mamet, Tom Stoppard and Leonard Cohen
- Nakane Kōtei (Jp, 1839–1913)
- Alanna Nash (US, born 1950) – Colonel Tom Parker, Dolly Parton, Elvis Presley and Jessica Savitch
- Hoda Gamal Abdel Nasser (Eg, born 1944) – Gamal Abdel Nasser
- Philip Nel (US, born 1969) – Crockett Johnson and Ruth Krauss
- Cornelius Nepos (AR, 100–24 BC)
- Nizamuddin Asir Adrawi (IN, 1926–2021)
- Vivien Noakes (En, 1937–2011) – Edward Lear
- Elizabeth Norton (En) – Ælfthryth, Margaret Beaufort, Elizabeth Blount, Anne Boleyn, Anne of Cleves, Elizabeth I, Catherine Parr and Jane Seymour
- Sergei Sergeyevich Oldenburg (Ru, 1888–1940) – Tsar Nicholas II
- Iris Origo (En, 1902–1988) – Lauro de Bosis, Allegra Byron, Francesco Datini, Ruth Draper, Teresa, Contessa Guiccioli, Giacomo Leopardi, Cola di Rienzo, Gaetano Salvemini, Bernardino of Siena and Ignazio Silone
- James Parton (US, 1822–1891) – Horace Greeley, Aaron Burr, Andrew Jackson, Benjamin Franklin, Thomas Jefferson and Voltaire
- Hesketh Pearson (En, 1887–1964) – Charles Dickens, Benjamin Disraeli, Charles II of England, William Hazlitt, Henry IV of France, Henry Labouchère, Anna Seward, James McNeill Whistler and Oscar Wilde
- F. David Peat (En, 1928–2017) – David Bohm
- Elisabetta Piqué (It) – Pope Francis
- Plutarch (AG, 46–127)
- Peter Popham (En, born 1950) – Aung San Suu Kyi
- H. F. M. Prescott (En, 1896–1972) – Mary I of England
- Zinaida Pronchenko (Ru, born 1981) – Alain Delon and Leonardo DiCaprio
- David Pryce-Jones (En, 1936–2025) – Cyril Connolly, Unity Mitford and Evelyn Waugh
- June Purvis (En) – Emmeline Pankhurst
- Arnold Rampersad (TT, born 1941) – Langston Hughes
- Helen Rappaport (En, born 1947) – Louis Daguerre, Vladimir Lenin, Sarah Rachel Russell, Mary Seacole and Henry Fox Talbot
- Piers Paul Read (En, born 1941) – Alec Guinness
- James Redpath (US, born En, 1833–1891) – John Brown (abolitionist)
- E. J. Richmond (US, 1825–1918) – Harriet Hosmer
- Fern Riddell (En, born 1986) – Kitty Marion and Queen Victoria
- Laura Toti Rigatelli (It, 1941–2023) – Évariste Galois
- W. Andrew Robinson (En, born 1957) – Satyajit Ray and Rabindranath Tagore
- Noëlle Roger (Fr, 1874–1953) – Henry Dunant, Jean-Jacques Rousseau and Germaine de Staël
- Romain Rolland (Fr, 1866–1944) – Beethoven, Michelangelo, Leo Tolstoy and Gandhi
- Toni Rothmund (Gr, 1877–1956) – Franz Mesmer
- Kate Mason Rowland (US, 1840–1998) – George Mason

=== S–Z ===
- Rafael Sabatini (It/En, 1875–1950) – Cesare Borgia and Tomás de Torquemada
- Henry Salt (En, 1851–1939) – Shelley, Richard Jefferies and Henry David Thoreau
- Anthony Sampson (En/SA, 1926–2004) – Nelson Mandela
- Carl Sandburg (US, 1878–1967) – Abraham Lincoln
- Anne Sayre (US, 1923–1916) – Rosalind Franklin
- Stacy Schiff (US, born 1961) – United States; Véra Nabokov, Benjamin Franklin, Antoine de Saint-Exupéry, Cleopatra and the Witches of Salem
- Anton Schindler (Ge, 1795–1864) – Ludwig van Beethoven
- Anne Sebba (En, born 1951) – Wallis Simpson
- Nachman Seltzer (Is, born 1976) – David
- Lee Server (US, living) – Robert Mitchum and Ava Gardner
- Miranda Seymour (En, born 1948) – Ada Lovelace, Annabella Milbanke, Hellé Nice and Mary Shelley
- David Shub (Ru, 1887–1973) – Vladimir Lenin and Joseph Stalin
- Dawn Langley Simmons (En, 1937–2000) – Princess Margaret, Margaret Rutherford and Jacqueline Kennedy
- Roy S. Simmonds (En, 1925–2000) – John Steinbeck, William March and Edward O'Brien
- Constance Babington Smith (En, 1912–2000) – Margery Blackie, Amy Johnson, Rose Macaulay, John Masefield and Julia Namier
- Jean Edward Smith (US, 1932–2019) – Ulysses S. Grant, John Marshall and Lucius D. Clay
- Rosita Sokou (Gr, 1923–2021) – Mario Frangoulis
- Laura J. Snyder (US, born 1964) – Charles Babbage, John F.W. Herschel, William Whewell, Richard Jones, Johannes Vermeer, Antoni van Leeuwenhoek and Oliver Sacks
- Dava Sobel (US, born 1947) – Maria Celeste (daughter of Galileo), Marie Curie and John Harrison
- Maynard Solomon (US, 1930–2020) – Ludwig van Beethoven and Wolfgang Amadeus Mozart
- Jonathan Sperber (US, born 1952) – Karl Marx
- David Starkey (En, born 1945) – Elizabeth I and Henry VIII
- Leslie Stephen (En, 1832–1904) – Dictionary of National Biography, Samuel Johnson, Alexander Pope, Jonathan Swift George Eliot and Thomas Hobbes
- Jane Agnes Stewart (US, 1860–1944) – Frances Willard
- Jeffrey C. Stewart (US, born 195o) – Alain LeRoy Locke
- Irving Stone (US, 1903–1989) – Clarence Darrow and Earl Warren
- Lytton Strachey (En, 1880–1932) – Thomas Arnold, Robert Dudley, 1st Earl of Leicester, Elizabeth I, Charles George Gordon, Henry Edward Manning, Florence Nightingale and Queen Victoria
- Abdulla Tafa (Alb, 1947–2015) – Ibrahim Kodra and Mustafa Krantja
- Marshall Terrill (US, born 1963) – Steve McQueen, Elvis Presley, Johnny Cash, Billy Graham and Pete Maravich
- Annie Thayyil (In, 1918–1993) – Joan of Arc and Indira Gandhi
- Ann Thwaite (En, born 1932) – Frances Hodgson Burnett, Edmund Gosse, Philip Henry Gosse, A. A. Milne and Emily, Lady Tennyson
- Judith Tick (US, born 1943) – Ella Fitzgerald and Ruth Crawford Seeger
- Mary Wilder Tileston (1843–1934) – Mary Wilder White, Mary Wilder Foote and Amelia Peabody Tileston
- Bankole Timothy (SL, 1923–1994) – Kwame Nkrumah
- Claire Tomalin (En, born 1933) – Jane Austen, Charles Dickens, Thomas Hardy, Dorothea Jordan, Katherine Mansfield, Samuel Pepys, Percy Bysshe Shelley, Ellen Ternan, H. G. Wells and Mary Wollstonecraft
- Nick Tosches (US, 1949–2019) – Jerry Lee Lewis, Dean Martin and Sonny Liston
- Meriol Trevor (En, 1919–2000) – John Henry Newman, Philip Neri, Pope John XXIII, Thomas Arnold and James II of England
- Henri Troyat (Fr, 1911–2007) – Dostoevsky, Leo Tolstoy, Gogol, Catherine the Great, Peter the Great, Ivan the Terrible, Anton Chekhov, Ivan Turgenev, Maxim Gorky and Rasputin
- Clara Tschudi (Nw, 1856–1945) – Marie Antoinette, Empress Elisabeth of Austria, Maria Sophie of Bavaria, Ludwig II of Bavaria, Letizia Bonaparte, Camilla Collett, Gertrude Guillaume-Schack, Eugénie de Montijo, Lina Morgenstern and Augusta of Saxe-Weimar-Eisenach
- Jenny Uglow (En, born 1947) – Elizabeth Gaskell, William Hogarth, Thomas Bewick and the Lunar Society
- Rosa Kershaw Walker (US, 1840s–1909) – eminent Americans
- Blanche Warre-Cornish (En, 1848–1922) – William Thackeray
- Kathryn Warner (En) – Edward II, Hugh Despenser the Younger, Isabella of France and Richard II of England
- Lady Rose Weigall (En,1834–1921) – Princess Charlotte of Wales
- Alison Weir (En, born 1937) – Anne Boleyn, Mary Boleyn, Elizabeth I of England, Eleanor of Aquitane, Isabella of France, Margaret Douglas, Countess of Lennox, Mary, Queen of Scots, Katherine Swynford and Elizabeth of York
- Sam Weller (US) – Ray Bradbury
- Theodore White (US, 1915–1986) – Lyndon B. Johnson and Richard Nixon
- Sibyl Wilbur (US, 1871–1946) – Mary Baker Eddy
- Alice Willard (US, 1860–1936) – Bertha Baur
- Gertrude Marvin Williams (US, 1884–1974) – Annie Besant and Helena Blavatsky
- A. N. Wilson (En, born 1950) – Sir Walter Scott, John Milton, Hilaire Belloc, Leo Tolstoy, C. S. Lewis, Jesus Iris Murdoch and John Betjeman
- Barbara Winslow (US) – Shirley Chisholm and Sylvia Pankhurst
- Cecil Woodham-Smith (En, 1896–1977) – Florence Nightingale and Queen Victoria
- Molly Worthen (US, born 1981) – Charles Hill
- Marguerite Young (US, 1908–1995) – Eugene V. Debs
- Elisabeth Young-Bruehl (US, 1946–2011) – Hannah Arendt and Anna Freud
- Stefan Zweig (Au, 1881–1942) – Marie Antoinette, Honoré de Balzac, Charles Dickens, Fyodor Dostoevsky, Mary Baker Eddy, Joseph Fouché, Sigmund Freud, Ferdinand Magellan, Friedrich Nietzsche, Romain Rolland and Mary, Queen of Scots

== Autobiographers ==
- Brianda de Acuña (1576–1630), Virtudes de la V. M. Teresa de Iesus, Carmelita Descalza del convento de Valladolid, en el siglo Doña Brianda de Acuña Vela
- Henry Brooks Adams (US, 1838–1918) – The Education of Henry Adams
- Ayaan Hirsi Ali (So, born 1969) – Infidel: My Life
- Nirad C. Chaudhuri (In, 1897–1999) – The Autobiography of an Unknown Indian
- Henry Cockburn (Sc, 1779–1854) – Memorials of His Time
- Frederick Douglass (US, c. 1817–February 20, 1895) – Narrative of the Life of Frederick Douglass, an American Slave (1845), "The Heroic Slave" in Autographs for Freedom (1853), My Bondage and My Freedom (1855) and Life and Times of Frederick Douglass (1881, revised 1892)
- Jens Jacob Eschels (Ge, 1757–1842) – first seafarer's autobiography in German
- Benjamin Franklin (US, 1706–1790) – The Autobiography of Benjamin Franklin
- Mahatma Gandhi (In, 1869–1948) – The Story of My Experiments with Truth
- Lee Iacocca (US, 1924–2019) – Iacocca: An Autobiography
- Nelson Mandela (SA, 1918–2013) – Long Walk to Freedom
- Frank McCourt (Ir/US, 1930–2009) – Angela's Ashes (Pulitzer Prize)
- Ronald Skirth (En, 1897–1977) – The Reluctant Tommy

== See also ==
- Lists of writers
