= Tileston =

Tileston may refer to:

== People ==
- Amelia Peabody Tileston (1872-1920), American Red Cross worker in Serbia during World War I
- John Tileston Edsall (1902-2002), American scientist
- Mary Tileston Hemenway (1820-1894), American philanthropist
- Jackie Tileston (born 1960), American artist and painter
- Mary Wilder Tileston (1843-1934), American author
- T. Tileston Wells (1865-1946), American attorney and the Romanian Consul General

== Other ==
- Tileston v. Ullman, United States Supreme Court case
