= Madame Rachel =

Madame Rachel may refer to:

- Rachel Félix (1821–1858), French actress known on the stage as Madame Rachel
- Sarah Rachel Russell (1814–1880), British con artist who went by the alias Madame Rachel
