= Muscle mommy =

Term for an attractive muscular woman

Muscle mommy is a term used to describe a muscular woman seen as physically or sexually attractive, as well as women participating in fitness activities that emphasized developing muscle. Muscle mommies initially emerged as a social media fitness trend in the early 2020s, gaining popularity particularly on TikTok, and overlapping with a broader rise in popularity of fitness influencers.

Like daddy seen in slang used by gay men, "muscle mommy" is commonly used by men and the LGBTQ+ community, particularly by sapphics. The phrase has been used to refer to real individuals, particularly online fitness influencers, as well as fictional characters in various media including film and video games.

== Background ==
Fitness trends for women have often focused on developing slim bodies and emphasized thinness, muscular body shapes for women began to become more widely accepted on various social media communities during the 2020s. Writing about the terms muscle mommy and wheyfu in 2022, MEL writer Magdalene Taylor stated "We're slowly moving past the cultural belief that feminine women 'shouldn't' be muscley. No longer is there a women's fitness binary split between the lean pilates look and the ultra-swole of bodybuilders." Acceptance of muscular women in offline spaces was also noted in the early 2020s. Writing about "Muscle Girls", a muscle-themed café and bar in Japan, Melissa Ge of Tokyo Weekender stated that previously, Japanese societal sentiment "believed that being skinny made women attractive"; Ge cited one of the bar's employees as stating that beauty standards in Japan were "gradually shifting" away from that sentiment. The broader acceptance of fitness trends promoting muscular body types for women overlapped with the rise in popularity of fitness influencers, who are social media personalities and content creators centering their online profiles around health and fitness topics. While they previously achieved followings online during the 2000s and 2010s, such figures began to particularly emerge following the COVID-19 pandemic.

== History ==
=== Social media popularity and influence on fitness ===
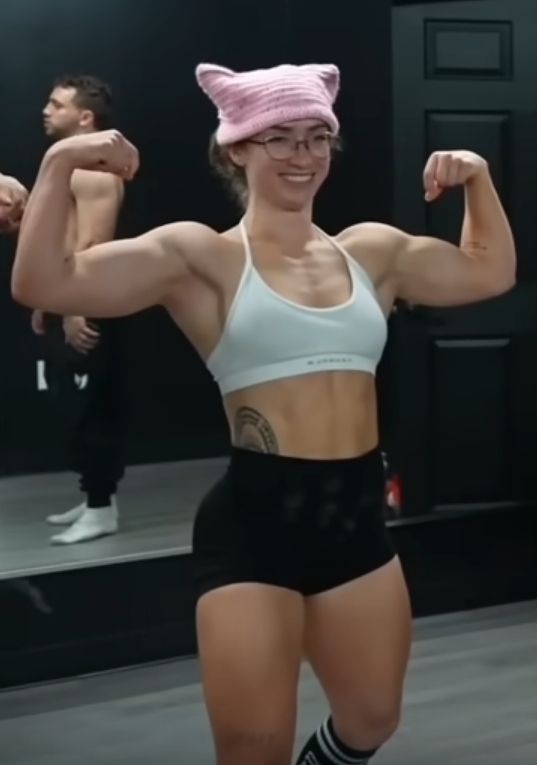
Online fitness influencer LeanBeefPatty has been cited as a muscle mommy.

Taylor wrote that as muscular body types in women began to garner wider social acceptance, or "as the appreciation for a variety of body types expands", the terms wheyfu and muscle mommy emerged. The former term is a portmanteau of waifu (an anime and manga term referring to female characters the viewer or reader "love in a wife-like way") and whey (a protein many weightlifters use). Taylor also cited Urban Dictionary's definition of wheyfu: "a girl, real or not, who hits the gym for strength and you find attractive." Though the latter muscle mommy term was earlier used in the 2015 diet and exercise book The Belly Burn Plan: Six Weeks to a Lean, Fit & Healthy Body by Traci D. Mitchell, it emerged as a popular term in the 2020s, being more closely related to women fitness influencers. The eponymous muscle mommies are women "dedicated to building and showing off muscular strength and physical prowess, in defiance of the idea that women's bodies should take up less space".

The muscle mommy term was particularly popular on TikTok, where it was a trend. At the time of Taylor's article, the #musclemommy hashtag garnered over 44 million views on the platform; she noted that many of the women in the initial muscle mommy trend were embracing it themselves. Taylor added that muscle mommy videos embraced the idea of women being muscular "in defiance of many beauty standards that suggest women shouldn't be so physically strong", but also pointed out that many of the videos tagged on TikTok with "#musclemommy" did not "shirk beauty entirely", as they still embraced "conventions of femininity" such as wearing dresses and doing their makeup. The term is also used within the "MomTok" community on TikTok, which comprises mothers on the platform discussing motherhood, with the term in this context referring to literal mothers who are involved in weightlifting and fitness.

In 2023, the term was used in official promotional material by the British gym apparel retailer Gymshark; writing for the company, Lannay Dale-Tooze described a muscle mommy as "someone who engages in strength training exercises intending to build and maintain muscle mass, improve their strength and overall fitness levels."

Google searches for "muscle mommy" and "strength training women" jumped in 2025, which Business Insider's Katherine Tangalakis-Lippert called a "sign that the strength-first mindset is no longer niche". In 2025, the weight loss drug Ozempic's accessibility and popularity helped usher in the "pilates body" fitness trend amongst women. When this discussing this trend, some women's lifestyle and fitness writers referenced muscle mommies. Róisín Lanigan of The Observer opined "If Ozempic makes extreme thinness accessible, and therefore less desirable as a result, then what comes next? Enter: the post-Ozempic muscle mommy. Toned but not bulky, carefully feminised rather than overtly strong, the post-Ozempic muscle mommy represents 2025 ideals of luxury as much as blue-veined boobs or Rubenesque curves." Meanwhile, Stephanie Maida of PureWow contrasted the two trends with each other, stating that "In a nutshell, 'muscle mommies' are out, 'Pilates princesses' are in. And I hate it."

=== LGBTQ+ community usage, popular culture depictions, and media commentary ===
The term has been adopted by LGBTQ+ communities, particularly sapphics, who have attached the term to celebrities and fictional characters alike. Pride.com writer Ariel Messman-Rucker wrote that Katy O'Brian, an out lesbian, starring in Love Lies Bleeding helped fuel the "new obsession" with muscle mommies. Messman-Rucker referenced the analogous daddy term, writing "we're used to gay muscle daddies posting thirst traps — and we love them for that — but now that we've discovered that there are lesbians out there who are posting pics and videos showing off their muscles, we can't get enough!"

Various media writers have used the term when writing about films, video games, and other media properties. Alexandra Koster of Refinery29, for example, wrote that "When I first heard of Love Lies Bleeding, I — like many other queer women — were ecstatic. Kristen Stewart and Katy O'Brian in a bodybuilding muscle mommy love story? Sign me up." The film's director Rose Glass stated that she was made aware of the term following the film's announcement and embraced it. Prompted with "A little bird told me you're becoming a muscle mommy..." during an interview with the Gay Times, the English musician Shura discussed her gaining musculature and went on to reference Love Lies Bleeding as a catalyst for her fitness training. Sydney Sweeney's role as Christy Martin in the biopic Christy (2025) was similarly described as a muscle mommy role that sapphic viewers shared excitement for online.

Various video games released in the 2020s featured characters that video game writers described as "muscle mommies". Abby from The Last of Us Part II (2020) was "for many a Sapphic fan of The Last of Us [...] the root of their Muscle Mommy obsession", according to Pride.com's Rachel Shatto. Shatto noted that the character was controversial for various reasons, some including plot-related, but others "more absurd" centered around her muscular body type; she opined that "in a nutshell, Abby is buff as hell and those muscles did not comport with the extremely narrow view of cis male neckbeard beauty standards". Writing about the Baldur's Gate 3 (2023) character Karlach, Tessa Kaur of TheGamer wrote that "Like many Baldur's Gate 3 players, I was instantly obsessed with Karlach's whole tiefling muscle mommy deal from the moment I saw her", with Kaur calling the character "bisexual bait". In an email to the game's developer, Larian Studios, applying for a job to design Baldur's Gate 3 apparel merchandise, artist Anna Hollinrake included they would make a "muscle mommy Karlach shirt". Nemesis from Hades II (2025) was similarly referred to as a muscle mommy by Them writer Samantha Allen. Malevola from the 2025 video game Dispatch was called a muscle mommy by the game's lead writer Pierre Shorette, and drew inspiration from the fitness influencer LeanBeefPatty, who herself has been described as one. The muscle mommy term and aesthetic has also been sexualized by gamers. Ana Valens of Vice cited the user Abdomera as having developed a "Muscle Mommy mod" for Helldivers 2 (2024); Valens detailed the mod "really brings out the dumpy thicc proportions", giving female-coded body types "toned figures, thick hips, and large bosoms".

== See also ==
- Body image
- Body positivity
