= Albert Charles Challen =

British artist (1847–1881)

- Born: 8 October 1847; Islington, London
- Died: 1 September 1881 (aged 33); Camberwell, Surrey
- Known for: Painting
- Notable work: 1869 portrait of Mary Seacole

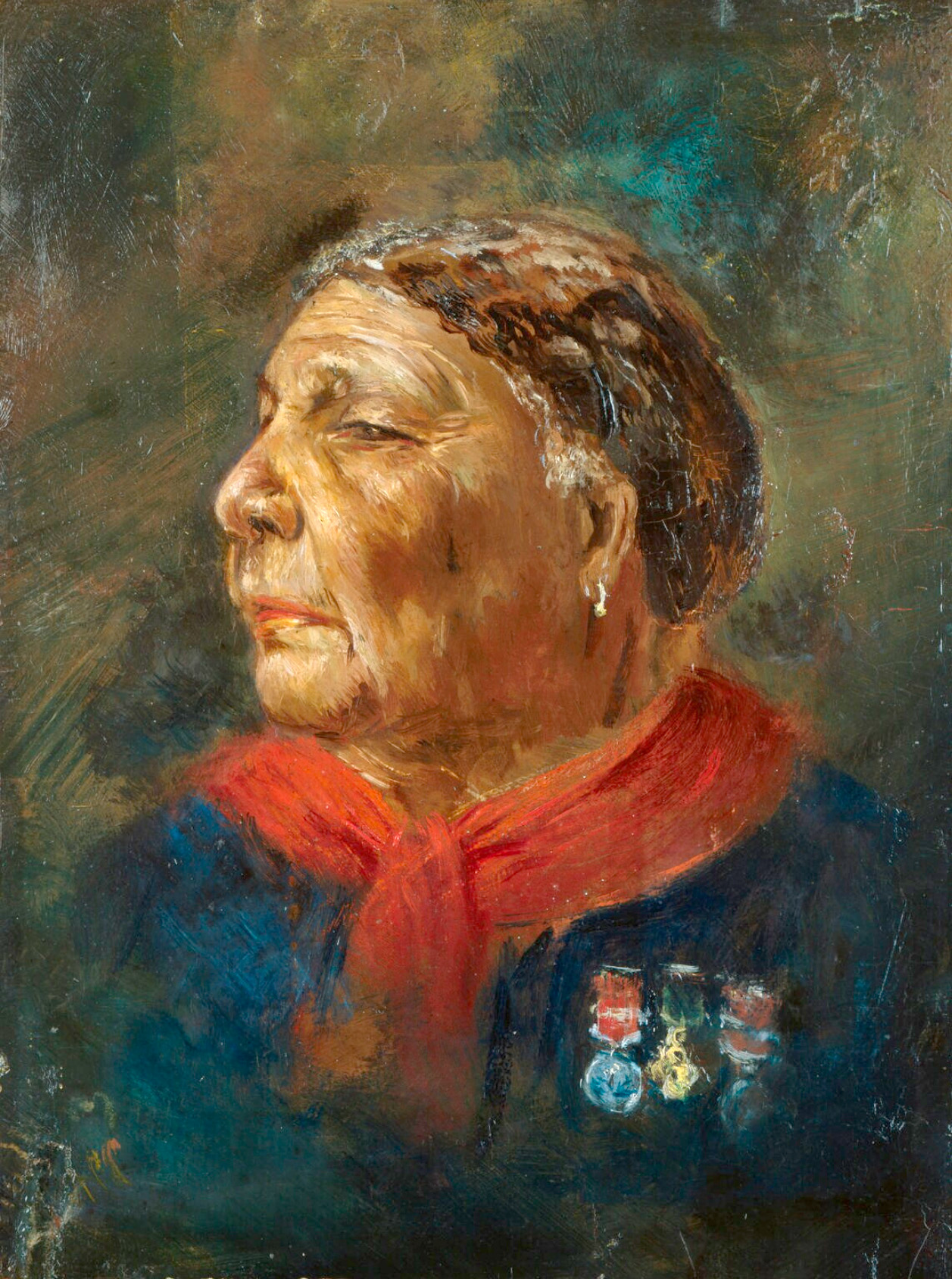
The portrait of Mary Seacole in oils, c. 1869, by Albert Charles Challen. The original is on display at the National Portrait Gallery in London.

Albert Charles Challen (8 October 1847 in Islington – 1 September 1881 in Camberwell) was a British artist. He is best known as the painter of a portrait of Mary Seacole in 1869, when she was around 65 years old and he was 22. The rediscovery of the portrait was announced in January 2005, and it is held by the National Portrait Gallery.

Born in Islington, the 1871 UK census shows Challen living in Hammersmith, with his profession given as "art student (painting)". By the 1881 census, he was living in Camberwell, and was a "practising artist". Based on this evidence, historian Helen Rappaport theorised that the Seacole portrait (which she had discovered) may have been a practice project for Challen, or done before he had attended art school; suggesting that the artist and subject may have personally known one another.

Challen died of tuberculosis at the age of 33 on 1 September 1881 in Camberwell, Surrey.
