= Molly Worthen =

American journalist and historian

Molly Worthen (born 1981) is a journalist and historian of American religion. She is a contributing opinion writer for The New York Times and a tenured professor at the University of North Carolina, Chapel Hill.

== Early life and education ==
Raised in Glen Ellyn, Illinois, she graduated from Yale University in 2003 and earned a Ph.D. in American religious history from Yale's Religious Studies department in 2011. She self-described as growing up in a secular household, and was generally an agnostic theist.

== Career ==
Her first book, The Man on Whom Nothing Was Lost, a biography of American diplomat and Yale professor Charles Hill, was published in 2006 and reviewed by The Boston Globe and Michiko Kakutani in The New York Times. Her second book, Apostles of Reason, examines the history of American evangelicalism since 1945.

Her work has appeared in The New York Times, Slate, Time, The Boston Globe, The New Republic, The Dallas Morning News, and the Toledo Blade. She is an associate professor of history at the University of North Carolina at Chapel Hill.

Her third book, Spellbound: How Charisma Shaped American History from the Puritans to Donald Trump, examines the impact of charisma as both a religious and political force in American life from the colonial period to the 21st century.

== Personal life ==
Influenced by J.D. Greear and Tim Keller, she converted to evangelical Christianity in 2022.

== Select works ==
=== Books ===
- Worthen, Molly (2005). The Man On Whom Nothing Was Lost: The Grand Strategy of Charles Hill. New York, NY: Houghton Mifflin Company. ISBN 0-618-57467-0.
- ——— (2014). Apostles of Reason: The Crisis of Authority in American Evangelicalism. New York, NY: Oxford University Press. ISBN 978-0-19-989646-2.
- ——— (2025). Spellbound: How Charisma Shaped American History from the Puritans to Donald Trump. New York, NY: Penguin Random House. ISBN 978-0593729007.

=== Articles ===
- ——— (June 2008). "The Chalcedon Problem: Rousas John Rushdoony and the Origins of Christian Reconstructionism". Church History. 77 (2): 399–437. doi:10.1017/S0009640708000590.

== See also ==
- List of biographers
