= Charles Hill (diplomat) =

American diplomat and academic (1936–2021)

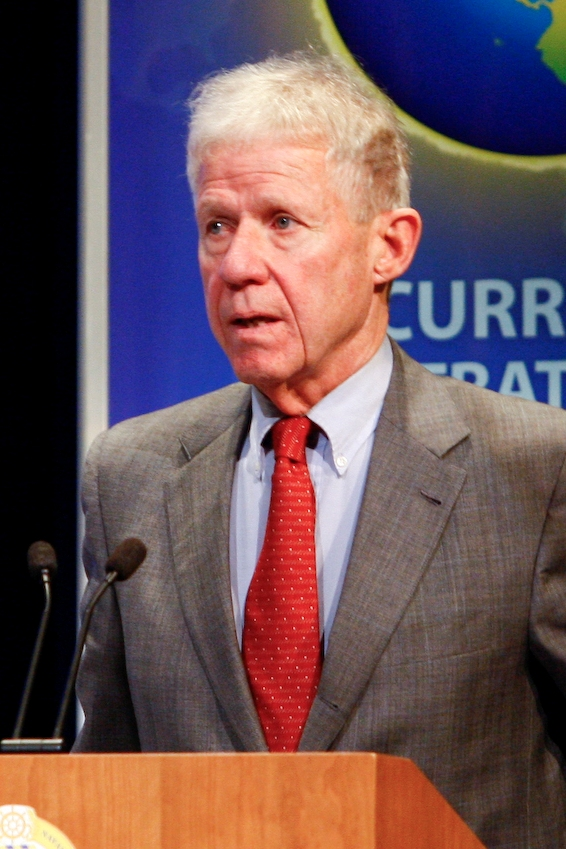
- Charles Hill in 2010
- Born: Morton Charles Hill; April 28, 1936; Bridgeton, New Jersey, U.S.
- Died: March 27, 2021 (aged 84); New Haven, Connecticut, U.S.

Academic background
- Education: Brown University (BA); University of Pennsylvania (JD, MA)

Academic work
- Discipline: Humanities
- Sub-discipline: Diplomacy; Foreign policy Leadership studies Statecraft
- Institutions: Harvard University; Cornell University; Yale University; Hoover Institution

Charles Hill

10th Executive Secretary of the United States Department of State
- In office 1983–1985
- Preceded by: L. Paul Bremer
- Succeeded by: Nicholas Platt

Morton Charles Hill (April 28, 1936 – March 27, 2021) was an American diplomat and academic. He served as diplomat-in-residence and lecturer in international studies at Yale University. A career foreign service officer, Hill was a senior adviser to George Shultz, Henry Kissinger, and Ronald Reagan, as well as Boutros Boutros-Ghali, the sixth secretary-general of the United Nations.

At Yale, he taught, along with Paul Kennedy and John Gaddis, the seminar "Studies in Grand Strategy", a rigorous interdisciplinary study of leadership, statecraft and diplomacy. He also taught students enrolled in the directed studies program at Yale.

== Early life and education ==
Hill was born in Bridgeton, New Jersey, on April 28, 1936. His father, Morton, worked as a dentist; his mother, Alvenia (Gates), was a housewife. Hill studied at Brown University, earning a bachelor's degree in 1957. He subsequently undertook postgraduate studies at the University of Pennsylvania, graduating from its law school in 1960 before obtaining a master's degree in American studies the following year. He then joined the United States Foreign Service.

== Career ==
=== Diplomatic service ===
As part of the Foreign Service, Hill was posted to Switzerland, Taiwan, Hong Kong, and South Vietnam. In the last capacity, he was a speechwriter for ambassador Ellsworth Bunker. Hill became a speechwriter for Henry Kissinger starting in 1974, with Kissinger later recounting how Hill "reviewed almost everything I wrote". He worked again with Bunker during the negotiations of the Torrijos–Carter Treaties.

Hill became political counselor for the U.S. Embassy in Tel Aviv in 1979, before being appointed director of Arab–Israeli affairs two years later and deputy assistant secretary of state for the Middle East in 1982. He subsequently acted as executive aide to George Shultz, the secretary of state, from 1985 to 1989. During this time, Hill was involved in nuclear arms control negotiations with the Soviet Union, as well as reaching out to Yasser Arafat. He was recognized for his thorough note-taking, penning approximately 20,000 pages that influenced policy discussions. These came under national scrutiny during the Iran–Contra affair. His notes and personal analyses not only assisted Lawrence Walsh, the independent counsel, to uncover more notes from Caspar Weinberger, it also helped Shultz become one of the few senior members of the Reagan administration not to be implicated in the scandal.

Hill quit the Foreign Service after George H. W. Bush took office in 1989. He assisted Shultz in writing his memoir Turmoil and Triumph (1993). He also served as a policy consultant to Boutros Boutros-Ghali, the secretary-general of the United Nations, from 1992 until 1996.

=== Academics ===
Hill taught at Harvard University and Cornell University throughout his diplomatic service. He joined Yale University in 1992, together with his wife who was a professor of political science. He became a full-time faculty member four years later. He notably created the Brady–Johnson Program in Grand Strategy in 2000, together with Paul Kennedy and John Gaddis. The three of them taught a year-long course titled "Studies in Grand Strategy", which looked at wide-ranging issues in statecraft and social change, while employing classical writings of history and literature. He also taught for over two decades on the university's Program in Directed Studies, an interdisciplinary examination of texts from Western classical tradition.

Hill later became a research fellow at Stanford University's Hoover Institution. Beginning in 2006, he offered a new course called "Oratory in Statecraft". Not since Rollin G. Osterweis, who taught "The History and Practice of American Oratory" until the late 1970s, had oratory been taught at Yale. He was listed as a signatory of a letter by the Project for the New American Century (PNAC) to George W. Bush, but disputed his signing of that letter. Hill worked as chief foreign policy advisor to Rudy Giuliani during his 2008 presidential campaign.

== Honors and recognition ==
Hill was a recipient of the Superior Honor Award from the State Department, the Presidential Distinguished Service Award, and the Secretary of State's Medal. He was conferred an honorary doctorate of laws from Rowan University.

== Personal life ==
Hill's first marriage to Martha Mitchell ended in divorce. They had two daughters: Catharine and Emily. His daughter Emily died in 2013 from cancer. He married his second wife, Norma Thompson, in 1992. They remained married until his death.

Hill died on March 27, 2021, at a hospital in New Haven, Connecticut. He was 84, and suffered from an infection prior to his death.

== Books by Hill ==
- Grand Strategies: Literature, Statecraft, and World Order, Yale, 2010. ISBN 9780300165937
- Trial of a Thousand Years: World Order and Islamism, Hoover, 2011. ISBN 9780817913243
- The Weaver's Lost Art, Hoover, 2014. ISBN 9780817917661

== Books about Hill ==
- The Man on Whom Nothing Was Lost: The Grand Strategy of Charles Hill, by Molly Worthen, Houghton Mifflin Harcourt, 2006. ISBN 9780547347684
