= Helen Rappaport =

British author and former actress

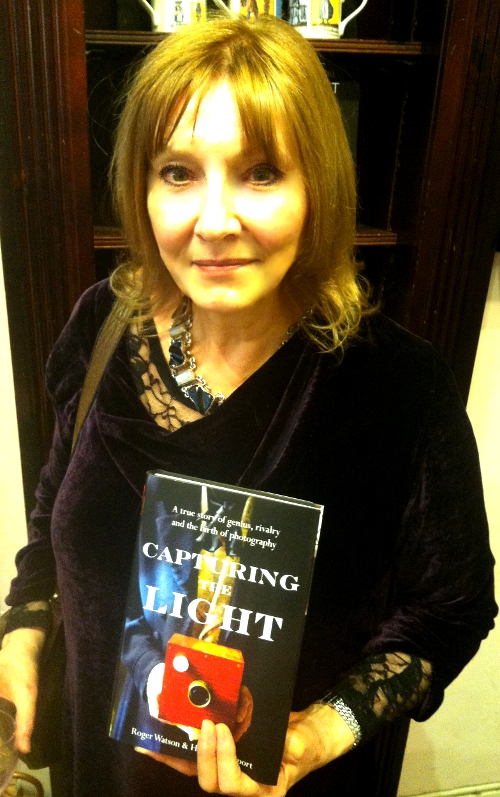
- Rappaport in London, c. 2013
- Born: Helen Ware; June 1947 (age 79); Bromley, England
- Education: Bachelor of Arts
- Alma mater: University of Leeds
- Occupation: Author
- Children: 2 daughters
- Website: helenrappaport.com

Helen F. Rappaport (née Ware; born June 1947) is a British historian and former actress. She specialises in the Victorian era and revolutionary Russia.

== Early life and education ==
Rappaport was born Helen Ware in Bromley, grew up near the River Medway in North Kent and attended Chatham Grammar School for Girls. Her older brother Mike Ware, born 1939, is a photographer, chemist, and writer. She has twin younger brothers, Peter (also a photographer) and Christopher, born in 1953.

She studied Russian at Leeds University where she was involved in the university Theatre Group and launched her acting career.

== Career ==
=== Acting ===
After acting with the Leeds University Theatre Group she appeared in several television series including Crown Court, Love Hurts and The Bill. She later claimed to have spent "20 years in the doldrums as an out of work, broke and miserable actress".

=== Writing ===
In the early nineties she became a copy editor for academic publishers Blackwell and OUP and also contributed to historical and biographical reference works published by for example Cassell and Reader's Digest.

She became a full-time writer in 1998, writing three books for US publisher ABC-CLIO including An Encyclopaedia of Women Social Reformers in 2001, with a foreword by Marian Wright Edelman. It won an award in 2002 from the American Library Association as an Outstanding Reference Source and according to the Times Higher Education Supplement, 'A splendid book, informative and wide-ranging'.

==== Mary Seacole ====
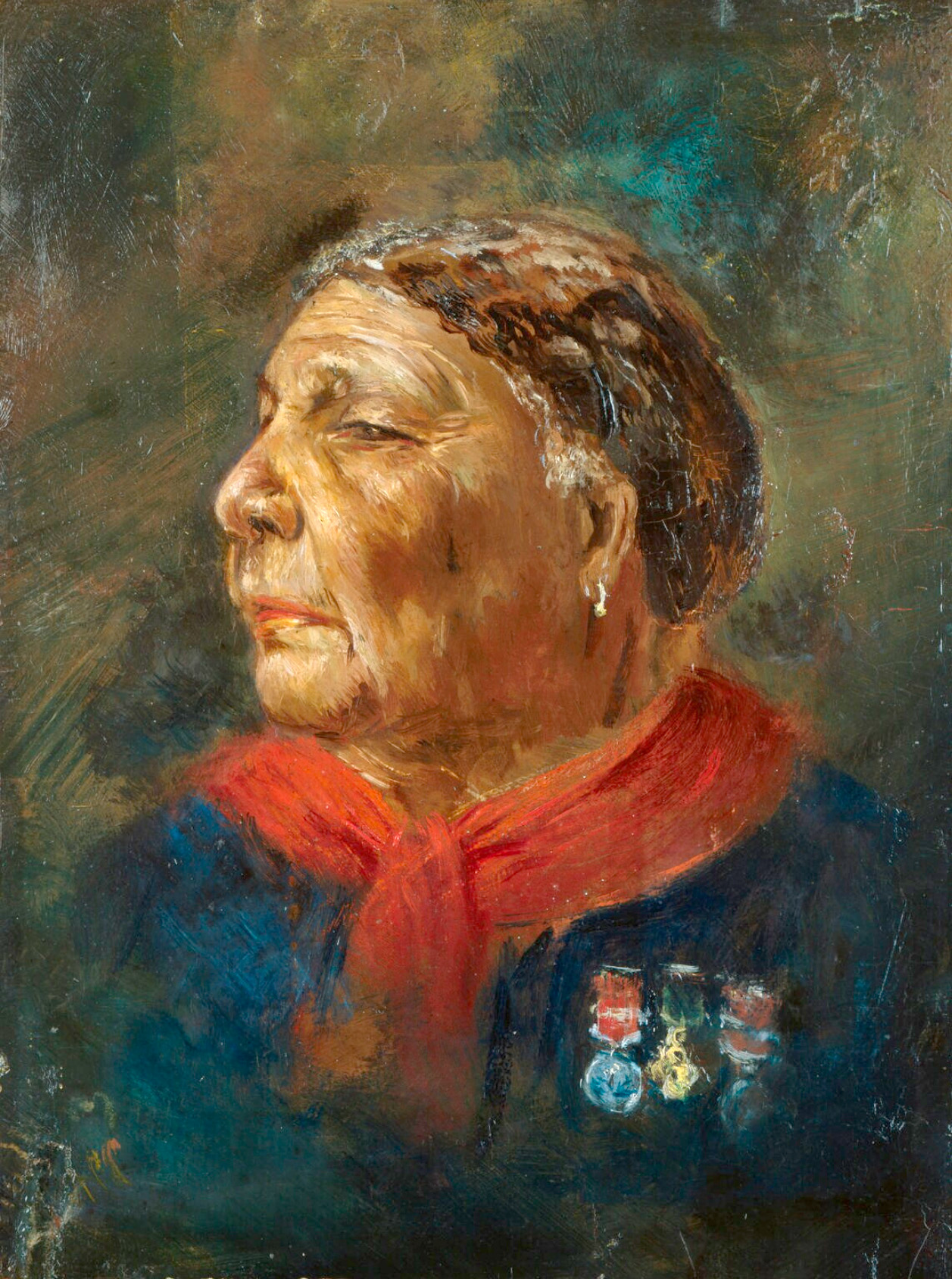
1869 portrait of Mary Seacole discovered by Helen Rappaport

In 2003 Rappaport discovered and purchased an 1869 portrait of Jamaican nurse Mary Seacole by Albert Charles Challen. The picture now hangs in the National Portrait Gallery.

Mary Seacole features in Rappaport's 2007 book No Place for Ladies: The Untold Story of Women in the Crimean War which was praised by Simon Sebag Montefiore as being 'Poignant and inspirational, well researched yet thoroughly readable' and also received positive reviews in The Times and The Guardian.

==== The Last Days of the Romanovs ====
Her 2008 book Ekaterinburg: The Last Days of the Romanovs received laudatory reviews in both the UK and US and was a bestseller.

==== Lenin ====
Conspirator: Lenin in Exile published in 2009 gained considerable publicity due to Rappaport's claim that Lenin died from syphilis and not a stroke.

==== Victorian cosmetics industry ====
Her 2010 book, Beautiful For Ever describes the growth of the Victorian cosmetics industry and tells the story of Madame Rachel who found both fame and infamy peddling products which claimed almost magical powers of "restoration and preservation".

==== Death of Prince Albert ====
Magnificent Obsession was published on 3 November 2011, the 150th anniversary of its subject; the death of Prince Albert.

==== Birth of photography ====
Capturing the Light: The Birth of Photography, co-written with Roger Watson, tells the story of Henry Fox Talbot and Louis Daguerre. Both authors took part in an event during the Edinburgh Book Festival on 14 August 2013.

==== Caught in the Revolution ====
Caught in the Revolution: Petrograd, Russia, 1917 – A World on the Edge was published in 2016 in the UK, where it received many positive reviews.

=== Translating ===
Rappaport is a fluent Russian speaker and is a translator of Russian plays, notably those of Anton Chekhov, working with Tom Stoppard, David Hare, David Lan and Nicholas Wright.

== Bibliography ==
"Love is not the right word – I have found all of them intriguing and fascinating, but also at times absolutely infuriating. You don't necessarily need to like your subject to write about him or her but you do need to be curious about them and you do have to want to get at the truth".

— Rappaport, explaining her feelings towards the persons she wrote about.

=== Non-fiction ===
- Joseph Stalin: A Biographical Companion, 1999 ABC-CLIO
- An Encyclopedia of Women Social Reformers, 2001 ABC-CLIO
- Queen Victoria: A Biographical Companion, 2003 ABC-CLIO
- No Place for Ladies: The Untold Story of Women in the Crimean War, 2007 Aurum Press
- Ekaterinburg: The Last Days of the Romanovs, 2008 Hutchinson
- Conspirator: Lenin in Exile, 2009 Hutchinson
- Beautiful for Ever: Madame Rachel of Bond Street - Cosmetician, Con-Artist and Blackmailer, 2010 Long Barn Books
- Magnificent Obsession; Victoria, Albert and the Death that Changed the Monarchy, 2011 Hutchinson
- Capturing the Light: The Birth of Photography, 2013
- The Romanov Sisters: The Lost Lives of the Daughters of Nicholas and Alexandra, 2014
- Caught in the Revolution: Petrograd, Russia, 1917 – A World on the Edge, 2016
- The Race to Save the Romanovs: The Truth Behind the Secret Plans to Rescue the Russian Imperial Family, 2018 St. Martin's Press
- After the Romanovs: Russian Exiles in Paris from the Belle Époque Through Revolution and War, 2022 St. Martin's Press
- In Search of Mary Seacole: The Making of a Cultural Icon, 2022 Simon & Schuster
- The Rebel Romanov: Julie of Saxe-Coburg, the Empress Russia Never Had, Simon & Schuster

=== Fiction ===
- Dark Hearts of Chicago (2007, Hutchinson) - co-wrote with William Horwood

== Family life ==
Rappaport has two daughters.
