= Sarah Rachel Russell =

Victorian Era British con artist

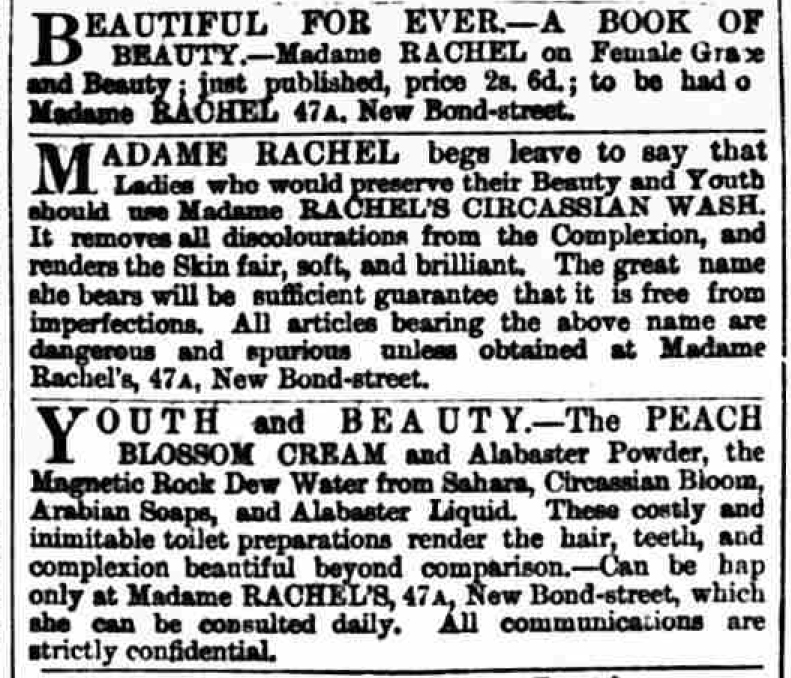
Advertisement by Sarah Russell in a newspaper

Sarah Rachel Russell (c.1814 – 12 October 1880) or Sarah Rachel Leverson or Levison (married name), more commonly referred to simply as "Madame Rachel," was an English beautician, con artist, businesswoman, entrepreneur, suspected brothel manager, and felon who lived during the Victorian era in London, England. She owned, managed, and independently operated her own beauty salon which sold beauty treatments and cosmetics that promised its predominantly female clientele eternal youth and beauty. Popular among the women of Victorian London's social elite, Russell was especially renowned for her "Magnetic Rock Dew" tonic, allegedly sourced from the Sahara desert. She would later become notorious for blackmailing many elite women of London's upper classes, crimes for which she would serve two separate prison sentences, the latter of which she died while serving.

== Life ==
=== Childhood and adolescence ===
Madame Rachel was born into a Jewish family in the poverty-ridden and severely overpopulated East End of London in the early nineteenth century. Russell would sell and distribute items in Wapping such as rabbit skins, dehydrated fish, hawking bottles, and even her used wardrobe as means of making money and she continued selling goods and services to the public into her adulthood.

=== Marriages and early career ===
Russell’s adulthood years would continuously consist of bringing money into her household. She was married three times, which involved her marriage to an assistant chemist in Manchester and in 1844 to Jacob Moses, who deserted her in 1846 and later drowned when the Royal Charter sank in 1859. She lived with, and took the surname of, Philip Levison. She worked as a clothes dealer and later was briefly jailed for procurement before selling cosmetics and toiletries in 1860. Jobs pursued would consist of running and operating a fried fish shop in the Clare Market (now present-day London School of Economics), fortune telling priced at a penny within the Covent Garden’s public houses, and working in the sex work industry by recruiting actresses working for Drury Lane’s theatres to toil in a brothel owned and operated by one of her companions in Long Acre, which is a street located in Westminster in London.

=== Success in the Victorian-era beauty industry ===
Around the 1850s, Russell began to expand her marketing horizons by dabbling in the beauty and cosmetics industry. She would sell hair dyes to the public and ultimately led her path in this field of marketing. These sales led to Russell changing her clientele, with her now operating under the title of “cosmetician”. In 1863 and under her new alias as “Madame Rachel”, she bought and opened a salon on Bond Street in the Mayfair district of London.

Cosmetics and beauty experienced an astronomical boom around the 1860s. During this time in the Victorian era, it was declared “unladylike” to wear makeup. In fact, wearable cosmetic products used to enhance one’s features were meant to be indulged by those in theatre and the sex work industry. The only way women and men could adhere to conventional beauty standard was to be of nobility status and from pinching one’s cheeks and biting lips to enhance the blood flow to those certain areas of the face, ultimately achieving that flushed, youthful look. A sense of yearning for the day that British citizens didn’t have to solely rely on dangerous, at-home beauty concoctions was strong. Madame Rachel opening the doors of her salon was the solution they needed and desired.

The presence that Madame Russell exuded was that of someone who regularly visited areas outside of Britain and had knowledge of the exotic products she sold. She donned lush robes, beautiful jewelry that draped her physique, and adorned herself with crystal talismans. One of her pricey goods was called “Magnetic Rock Dew of the Sahara”, which had the purpose of wrinkle removal and ranged at a price of $160 in today’s money. According to the product’s description, it offered to increase the rate of youth in the individual that used it and had been used in the country of Morocco for its helping agent. Other commodities that she sold in her salon were called the Circassia Golden Hair Wash, which aided in the problem of greying hair, Royal Arabian face cream, Honey of Mount Hymettus soap, Arab Bloom face powder, and various essences, perfumes, creams, and washes.

== Crime and moral conflicts ==
=== Harmful ingredients ===
Like many Victorian-era cosmetics, Russell's products were often based on or included substances known to be toxic, such as arsenic, corrosive sublimate, and prussic acid. Lead carbonate was also used, however, the connection between lead and its negative health impacts would not be widely recognised until the turn of the 19th century.

=== Enamelling ===
Otherwise known as “enamelling of the face”, this cosmetic practice would be used to whiten one’s skin colour and came to be due to the high demand of confining to the predominant English beauty standard of being fair-skinned, which resembled a symbol nobility and wealth. The dark secret of these skin-whitening practices through Russell was that it was severely dangerous from copious amounts of arsenic in the mixture she used. Majority of the ingredients were poisonous and caustic and would eventually lead to skin inflammation or sometimes death depending on how regularly the person used it consistently. The sad reality of this demand was that conventional beauty standards negatively morphed the self-perception of the individual who was seeking to be beautiful.

By any means to be considered attractive in the eyes of those living in nineteenth-century Britain, desperate consumers would flood through Madame Russell’s salon’s doors despite their skepticism. That was until the law caught up with her fraudulent acts and fake claims.

=== Scandals and rumours ===
Sarah Rachel Russell was involved in many marketing scandals and was a notorious con artist in the beauty industry. She took part in other schemes that she believed could make her more profit and did so unlawfully. Madame Rachel was exposed for consistently blackmailing female consumers that were not able to pay in full their first trip shopping, having her goods and offered services being deemed as fake, distributing abortion-inducing medications, and potentially running a brothel right above her salon.

== Trials ==
=== Early legal challenges and first trial ===
Though she had first been tried in August 1868, the first attempt at legal action against Russell failed and no conviction was reached. Retried a month later, Russell was – after a sensational four day trial (September 22–25, 1868) – convicted of fraud and sentenced to five years in prison, which she served in Millbank Prison. Baron Huddleston was part of the prosecution.

==== Mary Borradaile ====
Mary Borradaile frequently visited Madame Rachel's beauty shop. She was a widow and had a financial income that placed her within the middle-class tax bracket. Being considered "prey" among Rachel's predator-like traits meant that she fell victim to the conartist's ploys to steal money from her with fake, hollow promises of beauty and having a youthful presence. Borradaile indulged in Madame Russell's exotic baths and makeup, however was hesitant to splurge larger amounts of money on other expensive services.

Using careless methods to get what she desired, Russell would do anything for the sake of making profit which also meant harming her customers psychologically and mentally. Borradaile had a relationship blooming with a gentleman named Thomas Heron Jones, who was seventh Viscount Ranelagh. To damage her reputation as a widower, Russell claimed that Ranelagh wanted to arrange a secret marriage between him and Borradaile. This rumor gave her the advantaged to take widowess's inheritance she received from her late husband, which was approximately over $7,000 in US currency.

During the trial, Borradaile was on the stand as a victim of Russell's fraudulent endeavours and mistreatment. However, it was debated if the jury would show remorse or be in favour of her. During the court hearings, she was losing respect as a person because of how the jury felt about her role as a consumer and her moral standpoint of spending her late husband's money. Using her income from a late marriage partner on goods and services that were not deemed as necessary made Borradaile look incompetent and selfish. This sparked the conversation of middle-class women and their role as buyers and those who spend their money on useless services.

When she was released from clandestine imprisonment in April 1872, Russell started and operated a new beauty business on Duke Street and then later in Great Portland Street. 1877 marked a decade since she swindled Borradaile of her money and was the year she found another victim that would fall into her trap by the name of Mrs Pearce. By the time she was able to sense she was getting scammed, Russell pawned all the family jewels she used as payment to know of and use the "secret" that would make her beautiful forever. Pearce took Russell to court in April 1878 and she was convicted a second time, having to serve five years' penal servitude.

=== Second trial ===
Six years after her initial release in 1872, she was tried a second time in 1878 and was again sentenced to jail in Woking.

== Legacy ==
=== Effects on British consumers ===
The effects of Russell’s trial had sparked criticisms from everyday buyers that her manipulative advertising had been mishandled for a decent amount of time, which caused a sense of anxiety to purchase from other sellers. The multiple series of trials proved that there were not proper laws set in place to protect British consumers from the false, harmful advertising and products marketed for them.

== Family ==
=== Children ===
Her daughter Helene Crossmond-Turner was an operatic soprano who overcame the scandal associated with "Madame Rachel" and sang with success in England, America, and Italy, notably in the role of Aida in Verdi's opera of the same name. On 22 April 1888, following an argument with the producer, Augustus Harris, over a contract to appear at Covent Garden, in which she tore up the agreement and was replaced by alternative singers, she shot herself in the back of a cab at Piccadilly Circus, later dying at nearby St. George's Hospital.

=== Other relations ===
She was a cousin of the musician Henry Russell.

== Death ==
In 1880, she died in Woking Prison on 12 October 1880 after serving two years and claimed to be knowledgeable of the secrets of beauty until the day she died. She is buried in Willesden Jewish Cemetery in London; her grave is hard to find, and does not have a headstone.

== Sources ==
- Rappaport, Helen (2010). Beautiful for Ever: Madame Rachel of Bond Street – Cosmetician, Con-Artist and Blackmailer. Ebrington, Gloucestershire: Long Barn Books. ISBN 978-1-902421-52-0.
- Imbler, Sabrina. “The Victorian Influencer Who Peddled Poisonous Beauty Elixirs.” Atlas Obscura, Sabrina Imbler, 6 Aug. 2019,
- Rappaport, Helen. “Beautiful for Ever: The True Story of Madame Rachel.” Helen Rappaport, 12 Sept. 2018, https://www.helenrappaport.com/womens-history/the-true-story-of-madame-rachel/
- Whitlock, Tammy. “A ‘Taint Upon Them’: The Madame Rachel Case, Fraud, and Retail Trade in Nineteenth-Century England.” Victorian Review, vol. 24, no. 1, June 1998, pp. 29–52,
