= Laura Toti Rigatelli =

Italian historian of mathematics

Laura Toti Rigatelli (1941-2023) was an Italian historian of mathematics, founder of the Center for Medieval Mathematics at the University of Siena, biographer of Évariste Galois, and author of many books on the history of mathematics.

Toti Rigatelli is originally from Florence.

== Recognition ==
Toti Rigatelli became a corresponding member of the International Academy of the History of Science in 1993.

A festschrift, Il sogno di Galois: Scritti di storia della matematica dedicati a Laura Toti Rigatelli per il suo 60º compleanno, was published by the Center for Medieval Mathematics in 2003, in honor of her 60th birthday; it was edited by Raffaella Franci, Paolo Pagli, and Annalisa Simi.

== Books ==
Toti Rigatelli is the author and editor of many books in Italian on the history of mathematics, including a biography of Évariste Galois, Matematica sulle barricate: vita di Evariste Galois [To take up arms for mathematics: the life of Evariste Galois] (1993), which was translated into English as Évariste Galois 1811–1832 by John Denton and published by Birkhäuser in 1996.

Some of her other books include:

- Storia della teoria delle equazioni algebriche [History of the theory of algebraic equations] (with Raffaela Franci, 1979)
- La trattatistica matematica del rinascimento senese [The mathematical treatises of the Sienese Renaissance] (with Raffaela Franci, 1981)
- Introduzione all'aritmetica mercantile del Medioevo e del Rinascimento [Introduction to the arithmetic of commerce in the Middle Ages and the Renaissance] (with Raffaela Franci, 1982)
- Fonti per la storia della matematica : aritmetica, geometria, algebra, analisi infinitesimale, calcolo delle probabilità, logica [Sources of the history of mathematics: Arithmetic, geometry, algebra, infinitesimal analysis, probability theory, logic and foundations] (with Umberto Bottazzini and Paolo Freguglia, 1982)
- François-Vincent Raspail : una vita per la medicina e la rivoluzione [François-Vincent Raspail: a life for medicine and revolution] (1997)
- Lous-Auguste Blanqui: una vita difficile [Louis Auguste Blanqui: a difficult life] (2007)
- Sophie Germain, una matematica dimenticata [Sophie Germain, a forgotten mathematician] (2007)
- Évariste Galois: morte di un matematico [Évariste Galois: death of a mathematician] (with Paolo Pagli, 2007)
- Vagabondaggi di un genio [Wanderings of a genius] (2008)
- Renato Caccioppoli: tra mito e storia [Renato Caccioppoli: between myth and history] (with Romano Gatto, 2009)
- Matematica e teatro [Mathematics and theatre] (2010)
