= Gabriele Fritsch-Vivié =

German woman writer

Gabriele Fritsch-Vivié (born before 1968) is a German theatre studies schlolar, playwright and journalist. A member of the working group "Women in Exile", she focuses on biographies of political repression in the first half of the 20th century.

== Life ==
Fritsch-Vivié studied theatre science, music, philosophy and psychology in Berlin and Vienna and was promovierte a doctorate with a thesis about Ödön von Horváth. After her studies, she met Nelly Sachs in Stockholm in 1968. This led to an occupation with the writer who went into exil, which in the course of time led to a biography, essays and a radio documentary.

In Germany, Fritsch-Vivié acquired practical theatre knowledge under Oskar Werner, then worked as assistant director and dramaturg at various theatres.

She lives as a freelance journalist in Berlin and writes biographies, short portraits, essays and reviews. She also writes poems, libretti and plays for young audiences.

She created a play on genetic engineering, which premiered in February 2003.

She is a member of the working group "Women in Exile" at the Gesellschaft für Exilforschung .

She is also a member of the ZONTA International Club Berlin 1989.

== Publications ==
- Nelly Sachs. Mit Selbstzeugnissen und Bilddokumenten (Liste von Rowohlts Monographien; 496). Rowohlt, Reinbek bei Hamburg 1993, ISBN 3-499-50496-0.
- Mary Wigman (Rowohlts Monographien; 50597). Rowohlt, Reinbek bei Hamburg 1999, ISBN 3-499-50597-5.
- Tanz wird nur durch Tanz vermittelt: Mary Wigman. I: Amelie Soyka (ed.): Tanzen und tanzen und nichts als tanzen. Tänzerinnen der Moderne von Josephine Baker bis Mary Wigman. Aviva, Berlin 2004, ISBN 3-932338-22-7, pp. 62–76.
- Tanz – vom individuell freien Ausdruck zur offiziell geregelten Darstellung. Tanz im NS-Staat mit kurzem Ausblick auf das Exil. In Germaine Goetzinger, Inge Hansen-Schaberg (ed.): „Bretterwelten“. Frauen auf, vor und hinter der Bühne (Frauen und Exil; vol. 1). Edition Text + Kritik, Munich 2008, ISBN 978-3-88377-956-0, pp. 197–213.
- Der Bund – Soziales, Solidarität, Verbundenheit. Der Jüdische Kulturbund 1933–1941 in seiner Entwicklung, Aufgabenstellung und Wirkung. In Adriane Feustel, Inge Hansen-Schaberg, Gabriele Knapp (ed.): Die Vertreibung des Sozialen (Frauen und Exil; vol. 2). Edition Text + Kritik, München 2009, ISBN 978-3-86916-031-3, pp. 178–199.
- Gegen alle Widerstände. Der Jüdische Kulturbund 1933–1941. Fakten, Daten, Analysen, biographische Notizen und Erinnerungen. With a foreword by Jakob Hessing. Hentrich & Hentrich, Berlin 2013, ISBN 978-3-95565-005-6.
- Kurt Singer. Arzt, Musiker und Gründer des Jüdischen Kulturbundes (Jüdische Miniaturen; vol. 218). Hentrich & Hentrich, Berlin 2018, ISBN 978-3-95565-256-2.
