= Teresa, Contessa Guiccioli =

Author

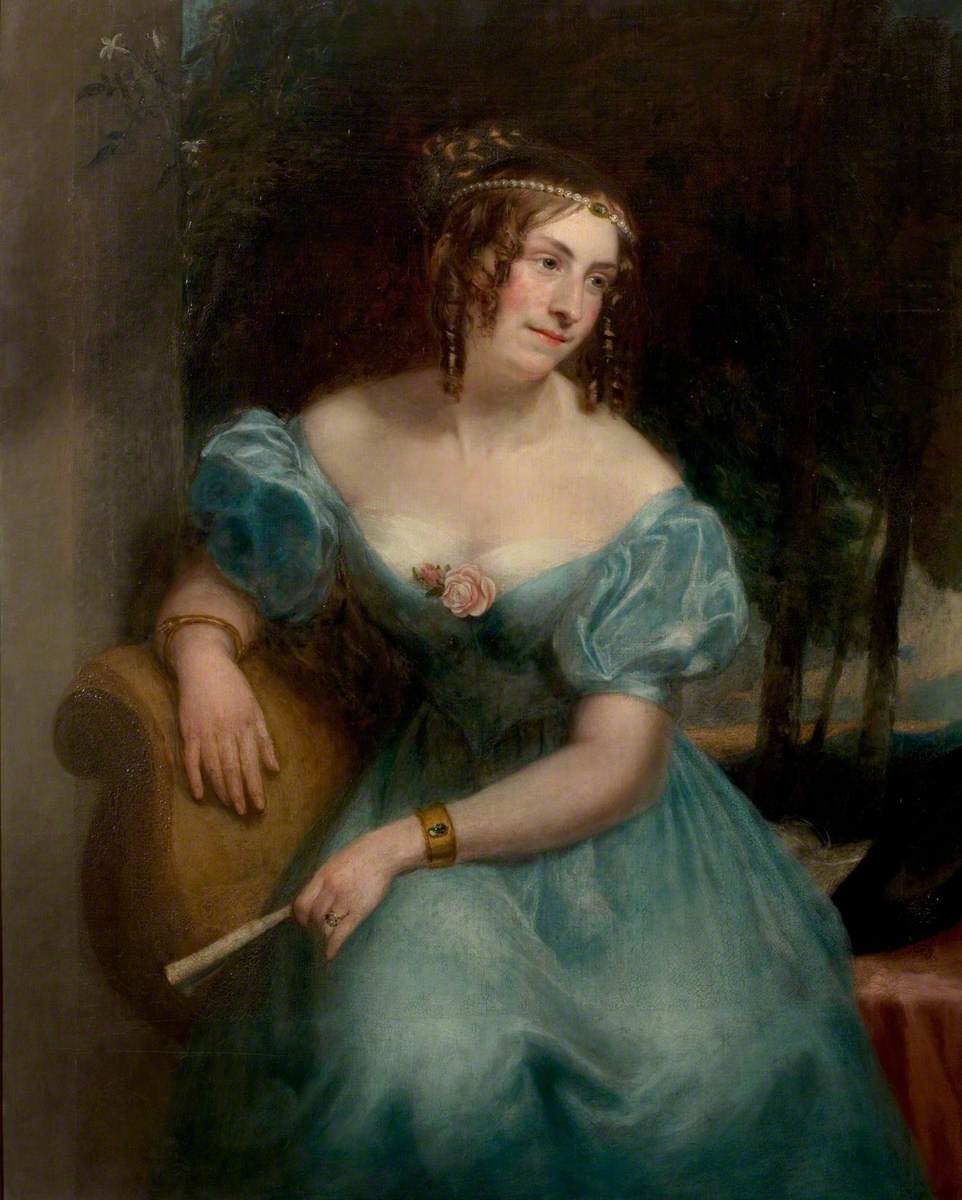
- Born: Teresa Gamba; 1800; Ravenna, Italy
- Died: 1873 (aged 72–73)
- Education: Saint Claire's Monastery at Faenza
- Spouses: Conte Alessandro Guiccioli (m. 1818); Marquis de Boissy
- Partner: Lord Byron

Teresa, Contessa Guiccioli (1800–1873) was an Italian noblewoman and the married lover of Lord Byron while he was living in Ravenna and writing the first five cantos of Don Juan. She wrote the biographical account Lord Byron's Life in Italy.

On 19 January 1818, Teresa married an elderly diplomat, Count Alessandro Guiccioli, who was 39 years her senior. It was three days later, on 22 January, that she met Lord Byron at the home of Countess Albrizzi. Count Guiccioli was a nobleman who had ingratiated himself with Napoleon during his campaign in Italy in 1796, and during the French rule of Italy during the Napoleonic era, Count Guiccioli held a series of high offices, making him one of the most powerful men in Italy. There is no evidence that Teresa, his third wife, ever felt any affection for him.

Byron's relationship with Teresa was a dangerous one as Count Guiccioli was still a powerful man who was widely believed to have been behind the murder in 1816 of another nobleman who was suing him for having seized his lands under Napoleon. In a letter to her sent on 22 April 1819 written in Italian, Byron wrote "you sometimes tell me I have been your first real love-and I assure that you shall be my last Passion". In a letter, Byron wrote that she mailed him some of her pubic hair, which was a traditional Italian gesture that indicated her willingness to begin an affair. The Countess Guiccioli lived with Byron as his common-law wife first in Ravenna and then in Genoa until 1823.

Her father, Count Ruggiero Gamba, was an Italian nationalist who wanted to unify all of the Italian states into one, a project that would also mean the Austrian Empire, which ruled much of what is now northern Italy (the Kingdom of Lombardy-Venetia) would also lose much territory. Under Teresa's influence, Byron joined a secret pseudo-Masonic society dedicated to Italian unity and driving out the Austrians that had already been joined by her father and brother. For plotting against the Austrian Empire, Count Gamba was exiled to the countryside of the Romagna region. In 1823, the Austrian authorities allowed Count Gamba to leave his exile in the Romagna with the condition that the Countess Guiccioli had to end her relationship with Byron and return to her husband. The news that the Countess Guiccioli was leaving him helped precipitate Byron's decision to go fight on the Greek side in the Greek war of independence. When Byron boarded the Hercules, the ship that was to take him from Genoa to Greece, it caused "passionate grief" from Guiccioli who broke down in tears as she said farewell to her lover. Going along with Byron to Greece was her brother, Pietro Gamba, who was to serve as Byron's bumbling right-hand man.

Later in life, she married the Marquis de Boissy who, even after their marriage, boasted of her liaison with Byron, introducing her as "Madame la Marquise de Boissy, autrefois la Maitresse de Milord Byron" (the Marquise de Boissy, formerly the mistress of Lord Byron).

Alexandre Dumas included her as a minor character in his novel The Count of Monte Cristo using the disguised name "Countess G-". Lord Byron also used this shortened name in his journals. At a party in Paris hosted by Napoleon III in the 1860s, the wife of the American ambassador introduced a wealthy American tourist, Mrs. Mary R. Darby, to the now elderly Contessa Guiccioli, saying she was one of the last people alive who knew Byron personally. Mrs. Darby introduced herself by saying that she had heard Byron was "king of poets", only for Guiccioli, who was still in love with him, to say that Byron was the "king of men". Mrs. Darby befriended Guiccioli who showed her two manuscripts that she had written in French, recalling her youth with Byron. Mrs. Darby, who quickly became Guiccioli's best friend, worked with her on turning the manuscripts into books, only one of which has survived. When the Contessa Guiccioli died in 1873 with no children, her papers were inherited by her grand-nephew, Count Carlo Gamba, who hid them away in his family's archives, believing that his grand-aunt's scandalous relationship with Byron would damage the reputation of the Gamba family. Not until 2005 was one of the books the Contessa Guiccioli wrote about her relationship with Byron published.
