= Mary Wilder Tileston =

American author (1843–1934)

Mary Wilder Tileston (née Foote; 1843–1934) was an American author and anthologist. In 1884, she published a collection of selections in prose and verse with accompanying texts of scripture intended for daily reading called Daily Strength for Daily Needs. The book attained a sale of over 250,000 copies by 1910 and was regarded in its day by many as the best of its kind. A companion book called Joy and Strength for the Pilgrims Day was almost as popular. As editor of books of selections for children, Tileston was equally proficient. This included The Child's Harvest of Verse, an collection of verse for children between 6 and 13, which was a new edition of Sugar and Spice and All That's Nice. Tileston's compilation of hymns of comfort for adults, originally called Sursum Corda, was brought out later under the title of Stronghold of Hope. Three works were associated with family members and these included: Memorials of Mary Wilder White, Caleb and Mary Wilder Foote: Reminiscences and Letters, and Amelia Peabody Tileston and Her Canteens for the Serbs.

== Early life and education ==
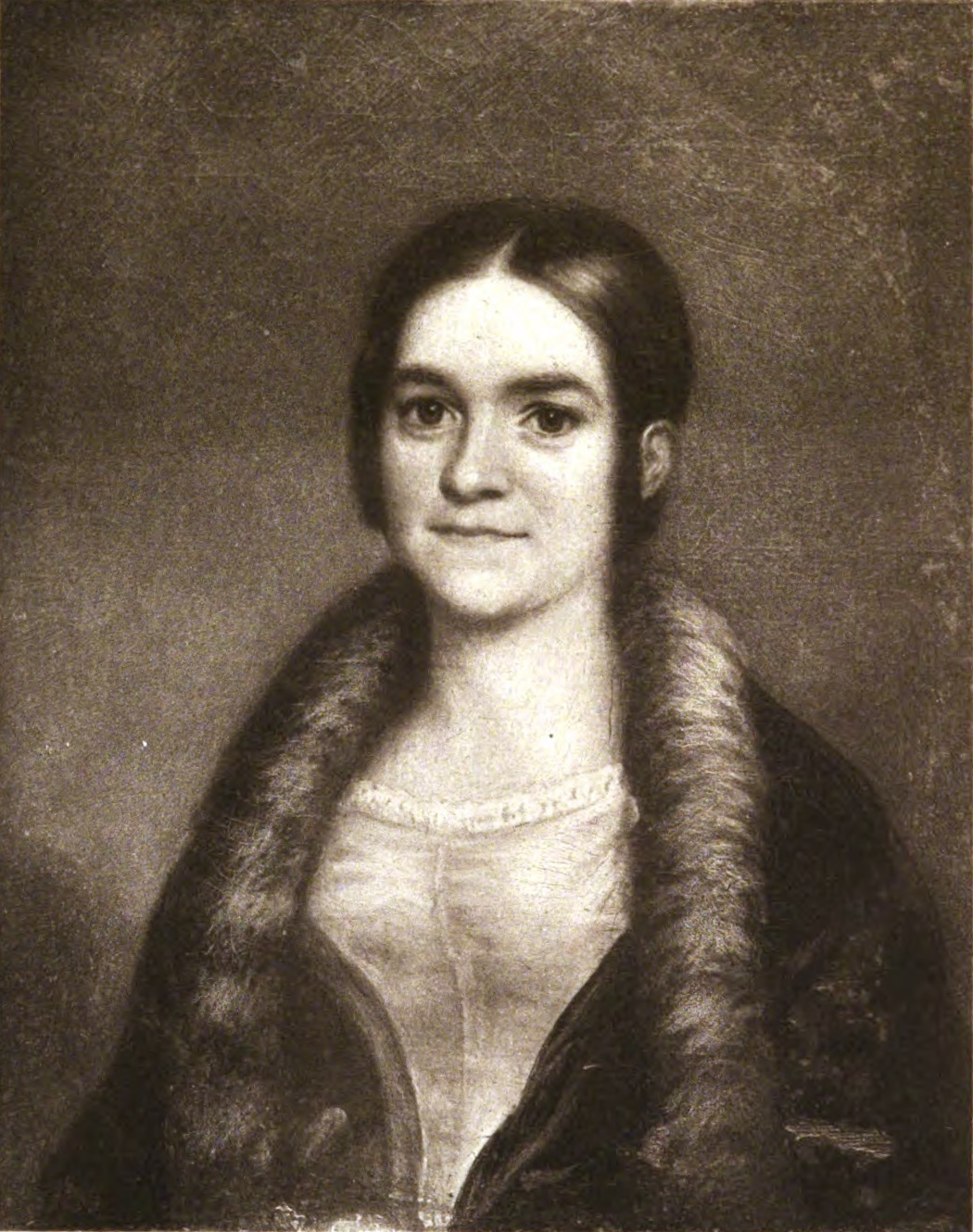
Tileston's mother, Mary Wilder (White) Foote, painting by Thomas Badger, 1841

Mary Wilder Foote was born in Salem, Massachusetts, August 20, 1843. She was a daughter of Caleb and Mary Wilder (White) Foote; a granddaughter of Caleb and Martha (West) Foote and of Daniel Appleton and Mary (Wilder) White; and a descendant of Pasco Foote, who had a grant of land in Salem in 1646.

She attended a private school in Salem. When her mother Mary died in 1857 she took charge of the upbringing of her younger brother, the composer Arthur Foote, from the age of four.

== Career ==
She became known as a compiler of hymns, and of selections from religious writers. Her publications include : Quiet Hours, a collection of poems (1874; 2d ser., 1880); Selections from Marcus Aurelius Antonius (1876); Selections from the Imitation of Christ (1876); Sursum Corda, Hymns of Comfort (1877); Sunshine in the Soul (1877); Selections from Epictetus (1877); The Blessed Life, Favorite Hymns (1878); Selections from Fénelon (1870); from the Apocrypha (1882); from Dr. John Tauler (1882); Heroic Ballads (1883); Daily Strength for Daily Needs (1883); Sugar and Spice, collection of nursery rhymes (1881); Tender and True (rev. ed., 1892); Selections from Isaac Pennington (1893); and Prayers, Ancient and Modern (1897 and 1902). She was residing in Boston, Massachusetts, in 1903.

== Personal life ==
On September 25, 1865, she married John Boies Tileston (1834–1898), son of Edmund Pitt and Sarah McLean (Boies) Tileston of Dorchester, Massachusetts. The couple had seven children: Mary Wilder Tileston, Margaret Harding Tileston, Roger Edmund Tileston, Amelia Peabody Tileston, Wilder Tileston, Edith Tileston, and Eleanor Boies Tileston.

Around 1874, John bought a farm in Concord, Massachusetts, where the family lived for eight years. It was a milk farm of 200 acres (81 ha), on the slope of Punkatasset Hill, running down to the Concord River. After 1882, when the farm was sold, the family lived for a few years in Salem, Massachusetts. and then in Brookline, Massachusetts.

Mary Wilder Foote Tileston died in Brookline, Massachusetts on July 3, 1934.

== Selected works ==
- Quiet Hours (1874; 2d edition, 1880)
- Selections from Marcus Aurelius Antonius (1876)
- Selections from the Imitation of Christ (1876)
- Sursum Corda, Hymns of Comfort (1877)
- Sunshine in the Soul (1877)
- Selections from Epictetus (1877)
- The Blessed Life, Favorite Hymns (1878)
- Selections from Fénelon (1870)
- Socrates- The Apology and Crito of Plato (with Benjamin Jowett, 1882)
- from the Apocrypha (1882)
- from Dr. John Tauler (1882)
- Classic Heroic Ballads (1883)
- Daily Strength for Daily Needs (1883)
- Sugar and Spice (1881)
- Tender and True (1882; rev. ed., 1892)
- Selections from Isaac Pennington (1893)
- Prayers, Ancient and Modern (1897 and 1902)
- Great souls at prayer – fourteen centuries of prayer, praise and aspiration, from St. Augustine to Christina Rossetti and Robert Louis Stevenson (1898)
- Joy and strength for the pilgrim's day (1901)
- Memorials of Mary Wilder White (1903)
- Quiet hours (1904)
- Caleb and Mary Wilder Foote: Reminiscences and Letters (1918)
- Amelia Peabody Tileston and Her Canteens for the Serbs (1920)

== Gallery ==
The blessed life

Classic heroic ballads

Daily strength for daily needs

Great souls at prayer

Joy and strength for the pilgrim's day

Memorials of Mary Wilder White

Quiet hours

Socrates- The Apology and Crito of Plato

Tender and true
