= Victorian-era cosmetics =

British cosmetics from 1837 to 1901

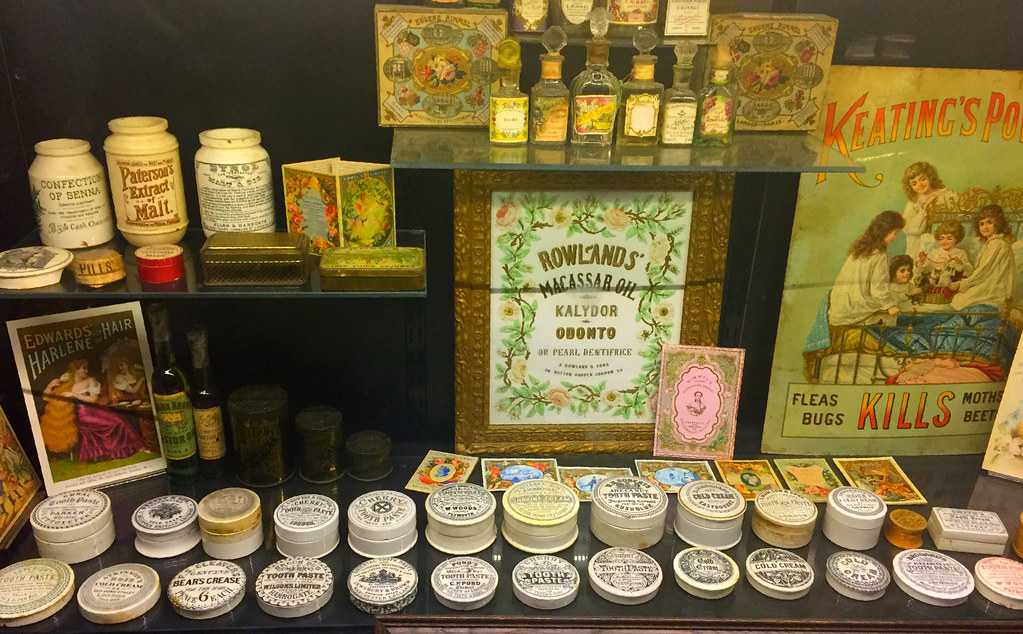
A display of Victorian Era Cosmetics

Victorian-era cosmetics were cosmetic products used during the Victorian age. Victorian cosmetics sometimes used toxic ingredients such as lead, mercury, arsenic, and ammonia.

Many cosmetic products were aimed at achieving as pale a complexion as possible, as this would indicate a woman did not have to work outside, and was thus of high status. The two main styles were "natural", which conveyed that a woman was of good morals, and "painted", which was seen as somewhat provocative.

Since commercially available cosmetics were not yet commonplace, women would often make their own products at home.

== Skin ==
The use of excessive makeup in the Victorian age was viewed as promiscuous and would only be seen on performers or prostitutes. A pure, natural face, free from blemishes, freckles, or marks was considered beautiful. However, that did not mean women did not secretly concoct their own remedies and cosmetics to enhance features and hide imperfections. Due to the association of makeup with sex workers and actresses, societal women did not want it known that they wore cosmetics so their beauty rituals were not publicized or discussed. Beauty standards of the Victorian era were also rooted in racism and classism, with one of the most important features for a woman in the Victorian Era was to have the most translucent, pale complexion possible. A fair and healthy complexion distinguished a woman's social status. This signified one was wealthy enough to stay indoors and avoid the sun. As a result, women often painted blue veins on their skin, including on their breasts. This was done using a blue paste that mixed calcium carbonate, gum arabic and Prussian blue. A lady of a higher social standing would use accessories like gloves and umbrellas to help protect her from the environment. Cold cream - consisting of water, oil, emulsifier, and thickening agent - became a staple in the beauty rituals of Victorian women. It was believed that cold cream is beneficial for cleansing the skin and providing a moisturizing effect, and so the cream was essential to Victorian women who wanted to maintain very soft, delicate skin.

Common skincare ingredients included rose water, glycerin and cucumber. These would be used to moisturize and improve the complexion.

Women who employed the "painted" look used white paints and enamels on their faces and arms. This would mean avoiding exaggerated facial expressions, because the substances would crack. These substances were also corrosive to the skin because they contained lead, mercury, and arsenic so women would have to keep applying them to cover the damage.

== Cheeks and lips ==
Rouge was used to help add color to cheeks and lips. While women were discouraged from wearing makeup, women found ways to improve their complexion with rouge. Natural ingredients, such as strawberries or herbs, were seen as providing a suitable colour, and thus preferred. Lip rouge was made from multiple ingredients such as animal fat, beet root, herbs, beetles and almonds, to produce a pink or red hue.

== Eyes ==
Watery eyes were considered attractive because (paired with pale skin) they were associated with tuberculosis. To achieve this, women put drops of perfume, citrus, or belladonna in their eyes - the latter an ingredient which would cause blindness if used for long enough. Mercury was used to make eyebrows and eyelashes less sparse.

== Hair ==
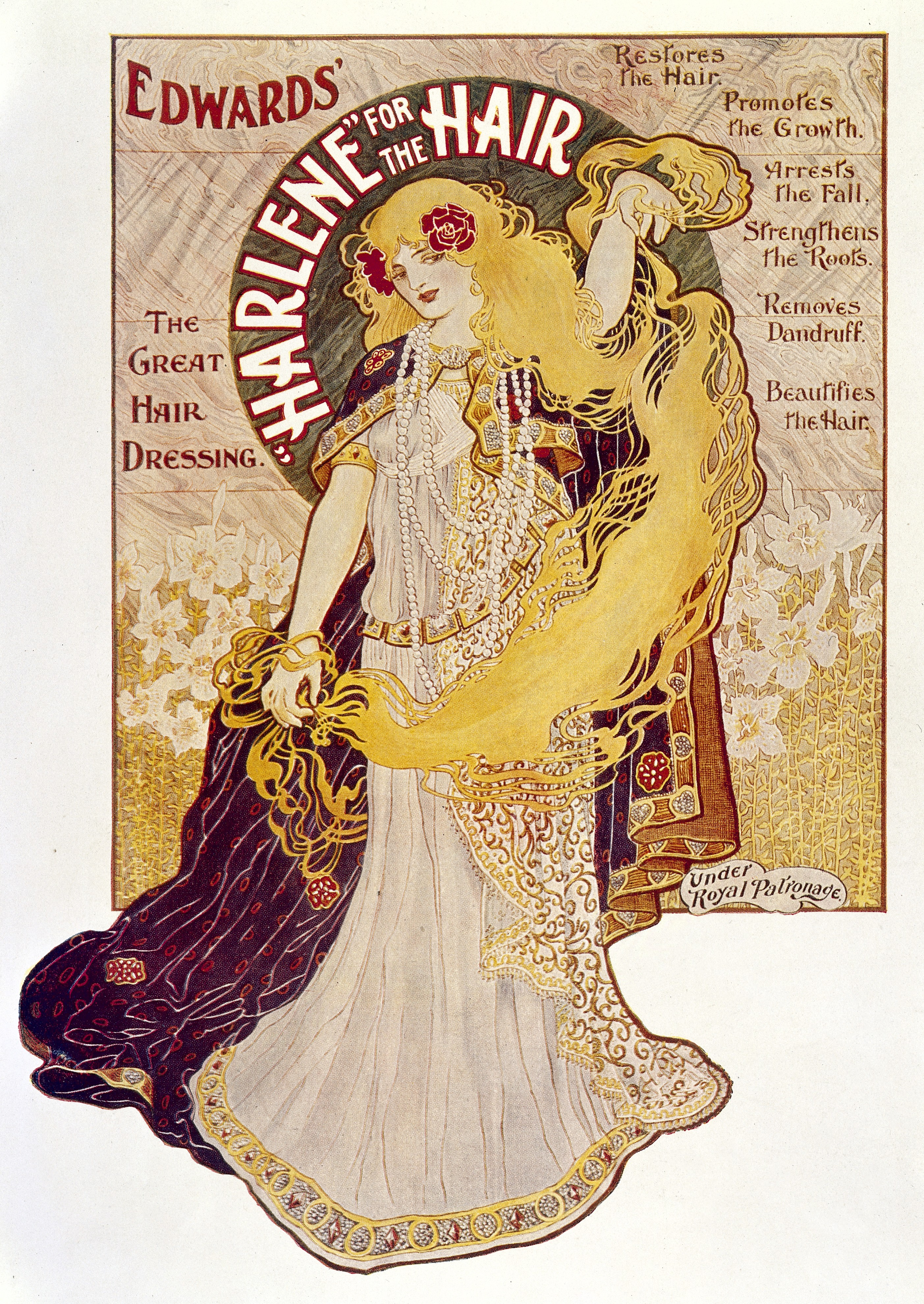
Edwards' "Harlene" for the hair advertisement

High society Victorian women went for natural beauty in regards to cosmetics to appear pure and youthful. However, there was a need for hair treatments and products that sustained intricate hairstyles. For many cultures, women's hair is an expression of their femininity, and Victorian women were of no exception. Many nineteenth-century photographs show women with extremely long hair. The length of the hair, in particular, was a display of a woman's health and was well taken care of. Both men and women used products to promote hair growth. Since the use of cosmetics on societal women was limited, hair was kept well groomed. Victorian women would braid their hair, use hair wigs, and apply heat to make tight curls. The Victorian era was a period in which it was more possible for women to focus on personal hygiene than it was in previous generations.

== Perfume ==
Natural scents were considered to be appropriate, while more overwhelming smells were associated with promiscuity. Queen Victoria considered floral scents to be the most appropriate for women to wear. Perfumes often used flowers such as lavender, violet, and rose - with violet being among the most popular - as well as citrus scents, and were sometimes infused with herbs such as rosemary to enhance the scent. Perfume was typically used on clothing, hair and handkerchiefs as opposed to on the skin.
