= Amelia Peabody Tileston =

American Red Cross worker

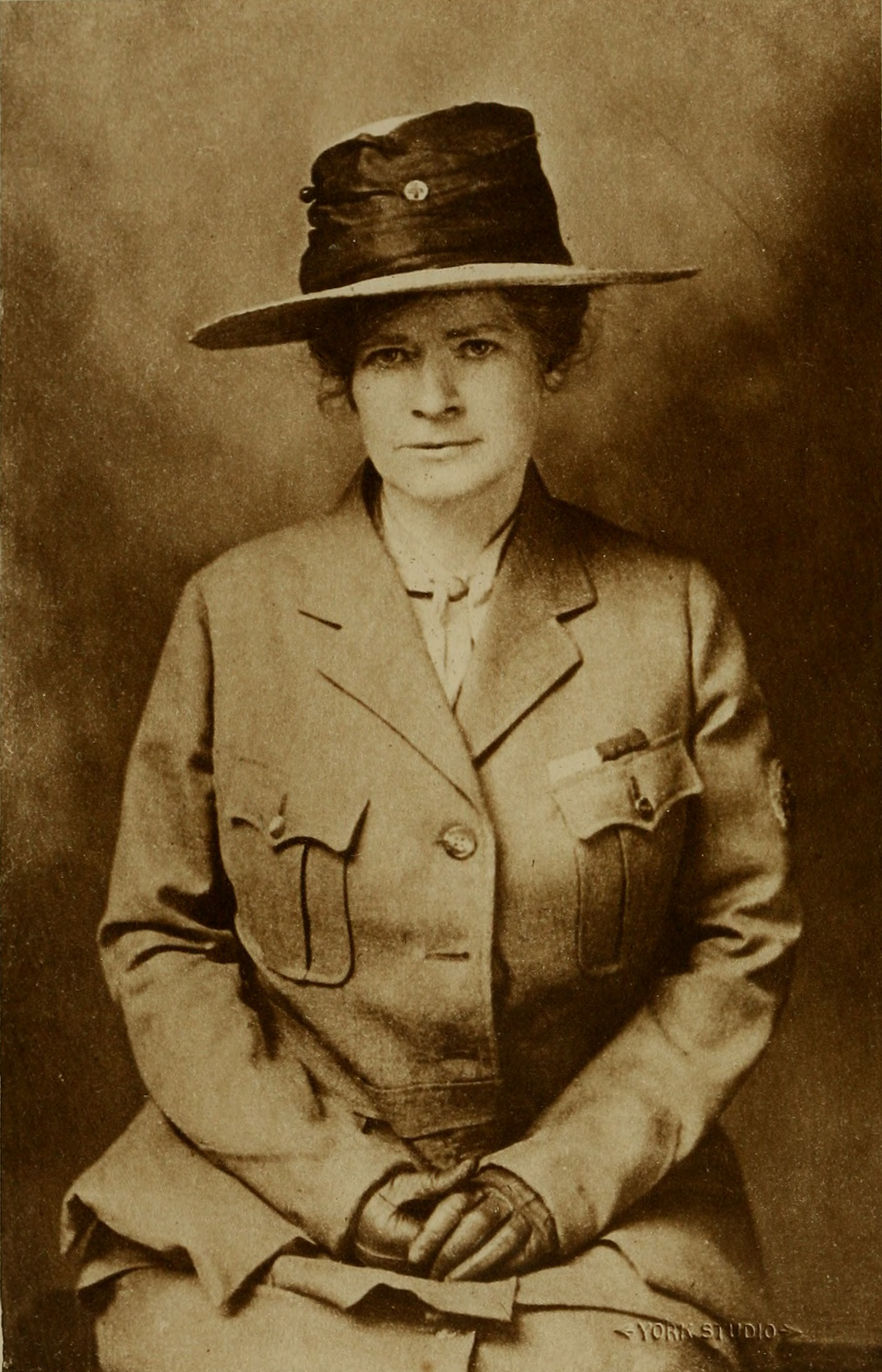
(undated)

Amelia Peabody Tileston (1872–1920) was an American Red Cross worker in Serbia during World War I. She organized and conducted free canteens in the Serbian Army from her own personal funds. She was the first woman, not a Serbian, to whom the Order of St. Sava (third degree) was awarded.

== Early life and education ==
Amelia Peabody Tileston was born on October 30, 1872, in Dorchester, Massachusetts. She was the third daughter, fourth of the seven children, of John Boies Tileston and Mary Wilder (Foote) Tileston. When she was two years old, her father bought a farm in Concord, Massachusetts, where the family lived for eight years. It was a milk farm of 200 acres (81 ha), on the slope of Punkatasset Hill, running down to the Concord River, and it gave the children the freedom and varied interests of country life.

After 1882, when the farm was sold, they lived for a few years in Salem, Massachusetts and then in Brookline, Massachusetts where Tileston enjoyed the companionship of other children, which she had not had before. In Brookline, she went to Miss Baker's school, and then, from Milton, Massachusetts, to which town the family moved in 1889, she went to St. Agnes' School in Albany, New York for a year, and, afterwards, to Miss Folsom's School in Boston.

She made her first trip to Europe in 1895, and went abroad many times afterward. She was especially fond of Italy, and of Cortina, in the Tyrol, where she took long walks through the mountainous countryside.

After her father's death in 1898, she went abroad for a year with her mother and three of her sisters. On their return, they lived in Boston for eight years, and returned to Milton in the autumn of 1907. When living in town, she used to take dogs from the Animal Rescue League to walk.

== Career ==
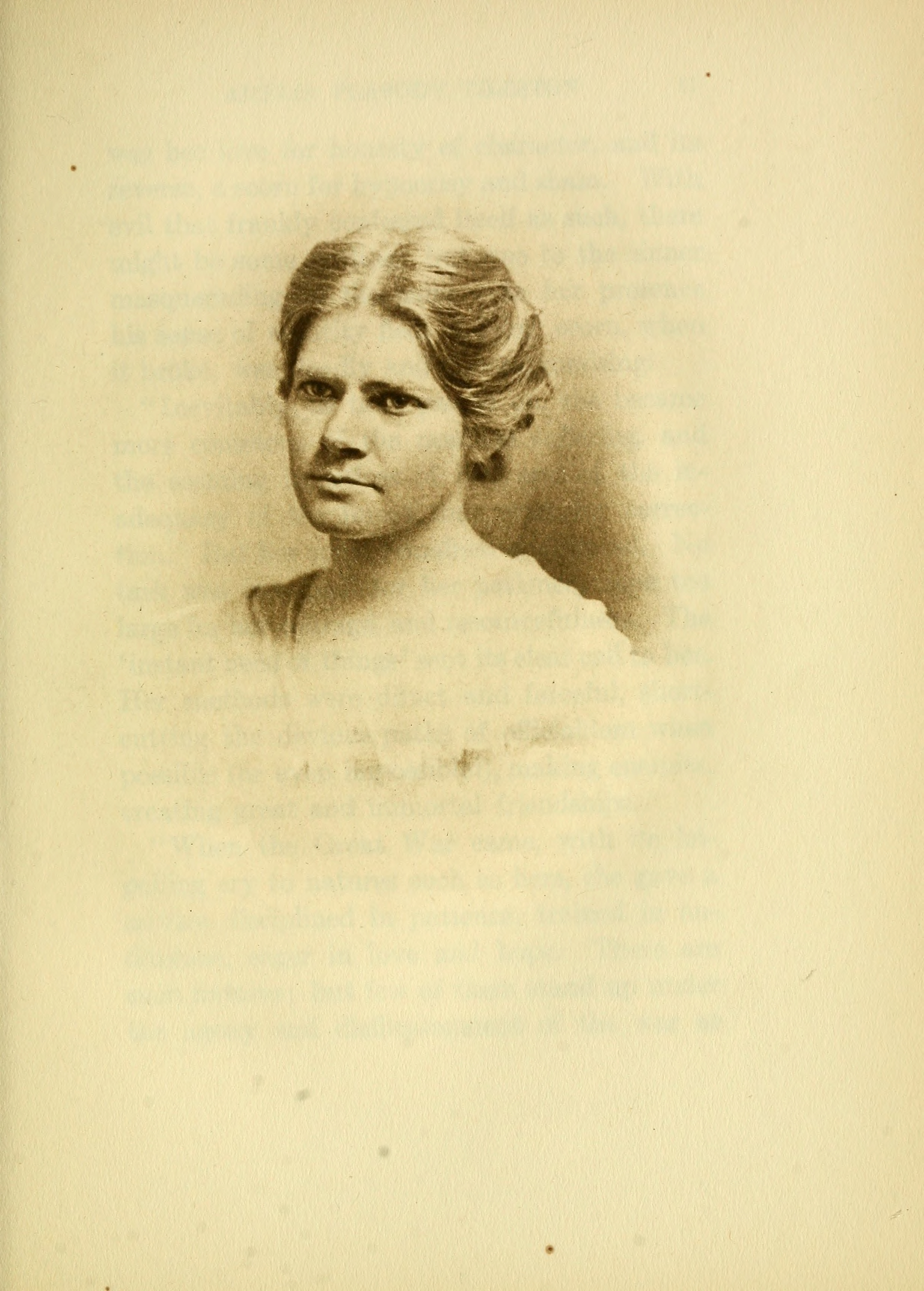
(undated)

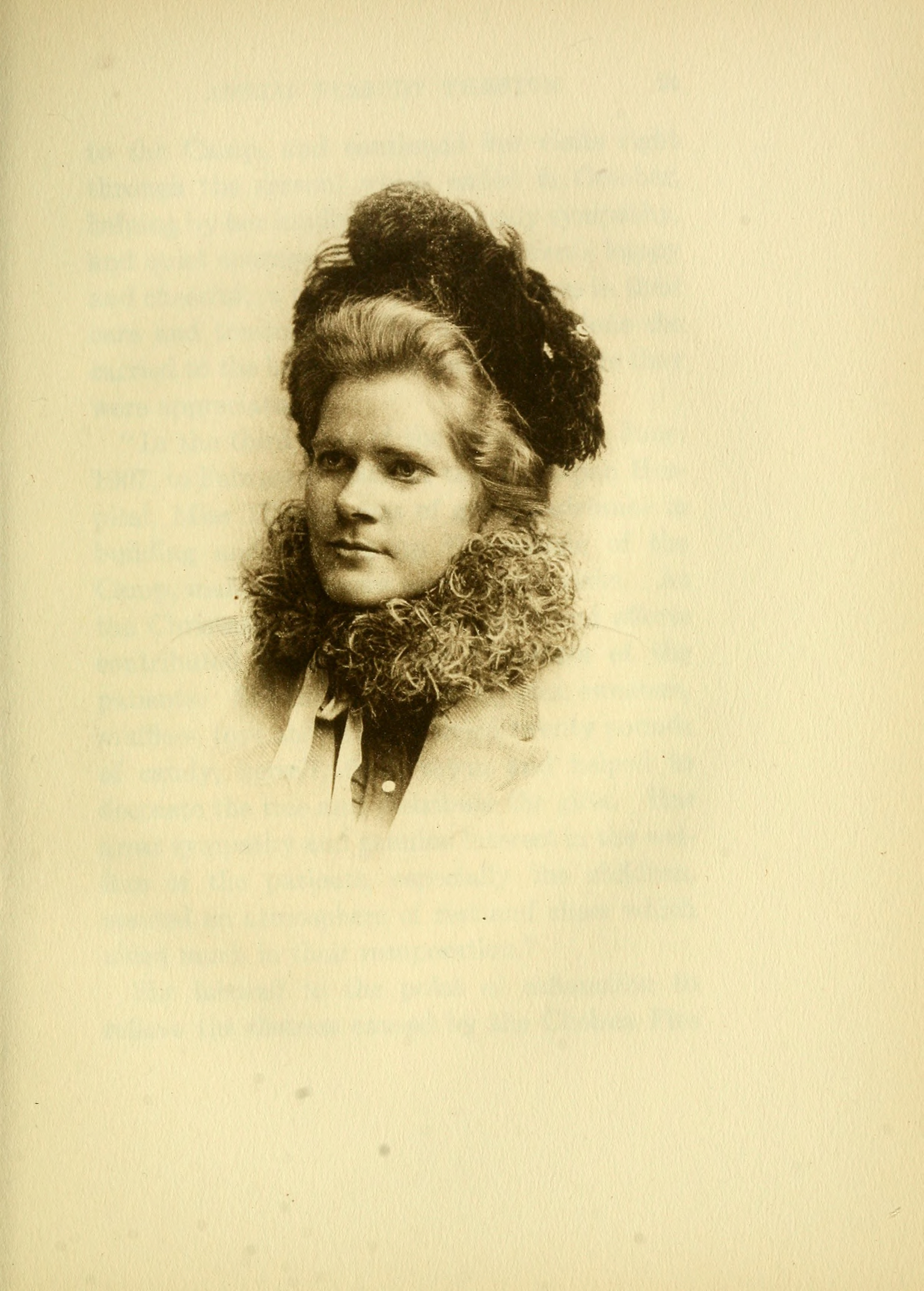
(undated)

Early in 1903, she took a three months' training course in nursing in subacute and chronic cases, under Miss Isabel Strong. The practical part was given at the bedside, in the Roxbury and South Boston districts, most of it among the very poor; and a very wide range of cases was given this particular class. Among those whom she nursed were some whom she visited and helped to the end of her life.

In 1905 and 1907, she worked in Day Camps for tuberculous patients. The first Day Camp in America for these was opened in July, 1905, on Parker Hill, under the auspices of the Boston Association for the Relief and Control of Tuberculosis, in charge of Dr. David Townsend. Tileston continued her visits at the Day Camp through the season, which ended in October.

In the third year of the Camp, from June 1907, to February 1908, at the Mattapan Hospital, Tileston assisted in building and keeping up the morale of the Camp, making frequent and regular visits. She brought many articles, sweaters, mufflers, toys and books, and 20 pounds of candy. Her sympathy for and interest in the welfare of the patients, especially the children, helped to foster an atmosphere of rest.

She labored to the point of exhaustion to relieve the distress caused by the Chelsea fire in April 1908. In October of the same year, she went to New York City, and stayed there for five months, working under Miss Jessie Belyea, under the direction of Dr. Theodore C. Janeway, in a Special Employment Bureau for the Handicapped. She was in the tuberculosis section, and one part of her work was to visit business offices continually, to try to find employment for the men, which was difficult to accomplish. The Bureau was discontinued after that winter.

In March 1912, after the death of her youngest sister, Eleanor, Tileston went to New Haven, Connecticut and did Social Service work there in the New Haven General Hospital, under Miss Belyea, for eight months. Her sister Margaret, Mrs. David Linn Edsall, died in the following November, and Tileston took charge of her household until the spring of 1914.

=== World War I ===
When World War I began, in August 1914, Tileston felt the urgent call to help to relieve the suffering which ensued, and she went in October to England, where she worked for a month in the Anglo-American Hospital in Paignton, Devonshire, doing night-duty, but she found it was abundantly supplied with nurses. Then, having been joined by Miss Belyea, she did relief work for Belgian refugees in London and Paris, but found both places overcrowded with workers. They went to Italy in January 1915, and the disastrous earthquake occurred a week after they reached Rome. They wanted to help in the ravaged districts, but could not obtain permission to do so. While they were in Rome, they were told of the great suffering and need in Serbia, where typhus fever had been raging for a number of weeks. They went there early in February, hoping to be of real assistance, but circumstances beyond their control obliged them to give up their undertaking.

They went to Athens next, having letters to Eleftherios Venizelos, through whom they hoped to find useful work to do, but his ministry fell the very day they landed at the Piræus. Queen Sophia heard of their arrival, and sent for them in order to ask about a number of details of nursing in America, as she was interested in building and running a new hospital in Athens. She wished, also, to send some Greek girls to the United States to learn to be nurses. Tileston was shocked at the scorn with which the Queen spoke of her Greek subjects, while giving the most unbounded praise to Germans.

Tileston and Belyea next went to India, where they had reason to think that they could be useful, but they found, when they arrived there, that it was not practicable. They returned to the U.S. by way of Java, China, and Japan, reaching home in September 1915.

That autumn brought overwhelming disaster to the Serbian army, and they were driven out of their country by the Austrians and Bulgarians. Then followed their terrible retreat over the Montenegrin and Albanian mountains, and then the transportation of the army and of the refugees to Corfu, and other places of refuge. Tileston was depressed during that winter, 1915–1916, while living at home in Brookline, by intense sympathy with the Serbian sufferings, and the great difficulties in the way of going to their aid, and she tried in many ways to help them. She collected money for the Serbs in various ways. As she thought that many would be willing to give small sums -as in the case of the Salvation Army- she obtained a license from the city to station men with contribution-boxes on the Boston Common, and in Harvard Square, for the four weeks before Christmas. She got the men from the Wayfarers' Lodge, and this helped, also, the needy men, more or less handicapped, to whom she gave employment. She studied the Serbian grammar assiduously, through the long evenings, to prepare herself for usefulness, when the opportunity should arrive.

She sailed for Europe on March 3, 1916, and spent several months endeavoring to reach a point where she could help them. While waiting, she nursed for a month at a hospital in Florence, Italy and for another month in a hospital on the road up to Fiesole, during the hot weather, when many nurses were away. At last, on October 30, 1916, she succeeded in reaching Salonika, and joined Emily Louise Simmonds (1888–1966), who had been working for the Serbians from the beginning of the war. A few weeks after the capture of Monastir by the Serbians on November 19, 1916, Simmonds and Tileston went to a dressing station at the front for two months. After this, they gave relief to many hundred refugees at Vodena for a number of weeks. While there, Tileston started a canteen for Serbian troops returning to the front from the hospital, and, about the middle of May, went to Vladova, where she established another, and, from that time on, she continued this kind of work. She came home for two months in the spring of 1919, largely for the purpose of arousing fresh interest in Serbia. It was her first visit to the U.S. since March 1916; it was not a period of rest, but of constant activity and fatigue. She sailed for Europe July 10, and on her arrival, joined Simmonds for two months in taking charge of a camp at Avala, 10 miles (16 km) from Belgrade, for four hundred children. After it closed, on October 1, she started a large canteen in Belgrade, with Simmonds's help, for the demobilized soldiers returning to their homes. She intended to carry it on till April 1920, when the need would probably be over, and then to return home.

== Death ==
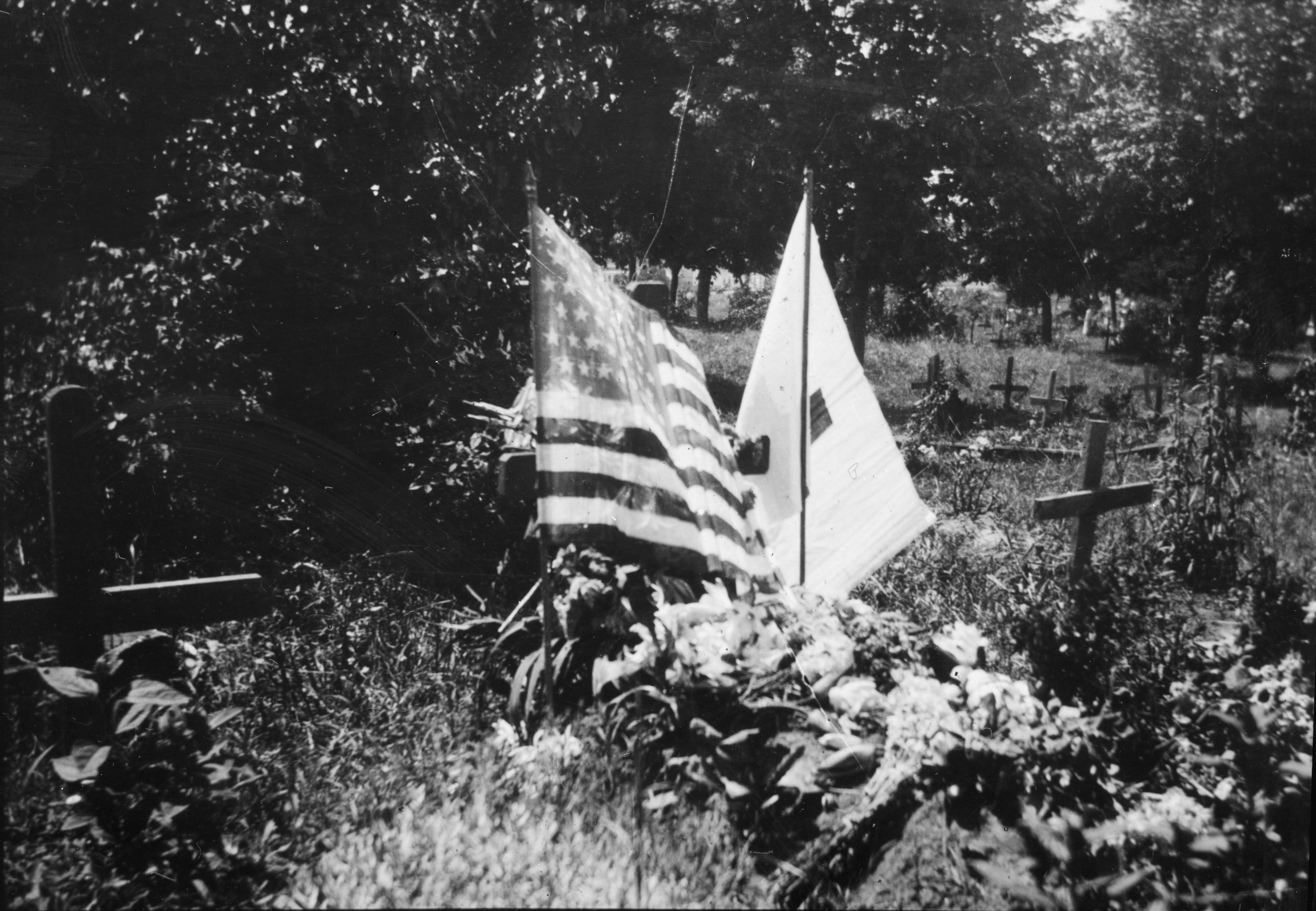
Tileston's grave in Belgrade

Amelia Peabody Tileston died of pneumonia in Belgrade, Serbia at the Scottish Women's Hospital, on February 22, 1920.

== Awards ==
Tileston was awarded the Order of St. Sava, Third Degree by the Serbian government in recognition of the service rendered the Serbian Army. She was the first woman, not a Serbian, to whom the third degree of the order was awarded.

Just before her death, Tileston was presented the Serbian Gold War Medal and the Order of St Sava, Fifth Degree, for her work at the front.
