= Chiangism =

Chinese nationalist political philosophy

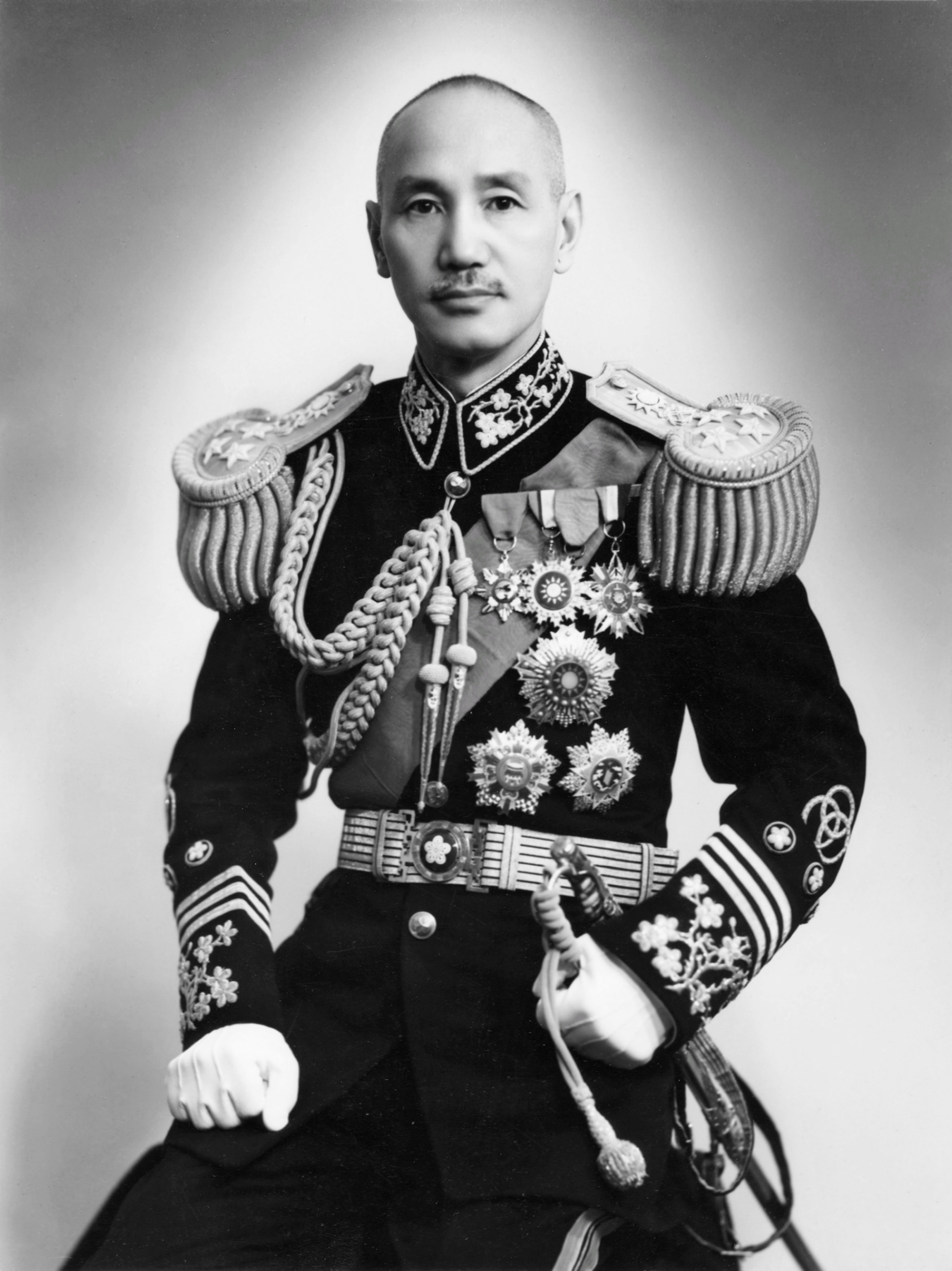
Chiang Kai-shek, after whom Chiangism is named

Chiangism (Chinese: 蔣介石主義; pinyin: Jiǎng Jièshí zhǔyì; Wade–Giles: Chiang^{3} Chieh^{4}-shih^{2} chu^{3}i^{4}), also known as the Political Philosophy of Chiang Kai-shek, or Chiang Kai-shek Thought, is the political philosophy of President Generalissimo Chiang Kai-shek, who used it during his rule in China under the Kuomintang on both the mainland and Taiwan. It is a right-wing (Note: During the 1920s and early 1930s, Chiang and supporters was seen as a 'centrist' among 'right-wing' Hu Hanmin supporters and 'left-wing' Wang Jingwei supporters, but the Chinese Communist Party later emerged as the main rival of the KMT, making Chiangism a 'right-wing' ideology.) authoritarian nationalist and conservative ideology based on the Three Principles of the People mixed with Confucianism. It was primarily practiced as part of the New Life Movement, as well as the Chinese Cultural Renaissance movement. It was influenced by other political ideologies, including socialism, ultranationalism, anti-communism, anti-liberalism, Georgism and paternalistic conservatism. Chiang's Methodist Christian beliefs also played a role in shaping his ideology.

Chiangism opposed feudalism, communism, and imperialism while promoting ideals of a unified Chinese national identity. It was initially influenced by socialism but became increasingly aligned with state capitalism after 1955. The extent of fascist influence on Chiang is debated among scholars. Chiangism was largely diminished in mainland China by the Campaign to Suppress Counterrevolutionaries of the communists and began to wane at the start of democratization in Taiwan.

== History ==
=== Mainland China ===
The socialist ideology of the Kuomintang was one of the ideologies which greatly influenced this philosophy. In the West, Chiang Kai-shek was hailed as one of the world's greatest socialist leaders. His portraits were carried along with portraits of Karl Marx, Vladimir Lenin, Joseph Stalin, and other socialist and communist leaders. Despite earlier alliance, Chiang Kai-shek would soon be an enemy of the CCP in the Chinese Civil War following the Shanghai massacre as he turned into a staunch anti-communist. Eventually, Chiang would lose the civil war to the CCP under the leadership of Mao Zedong.

Unlike Sun's original Three Principles of the People which was heavily influenced by Western enlightenment theorists such as Henry George, Abraham Lincoln, Russell, and Mill, the traditional Chinese Confucian influence on Chiang's ideology is much stronger. Chiang rejected the Western progressive ideologies of individualism, liberalism, and the cultural aspects of Marxism. Therefore, Chiangism is generally more culturally and socially conservative than Sun Yat-sen ideologically.

The Kuomintang government under Chiang Kai-shek denounced feudalism as counterrevolutionary and proclaimed itself to be revolutionary. He accused other Chinese warlords of being feudalists. Despite being a conservative ideology, Chiangism supported modernization policies such as women's rights, scientific advancement, and universal education.

=== Taiwan ===
After losing mainland China to the CCP and retreating to Taiwan, the KMT under Chiang's leadership established agencies such as the Bureau of Investigation and Statistics, the Political Warfare Bureau, and the Taiwan Garrison Command to provide surveillance on the population and suppress dissidents, including suspected communists, during the White Terror. The constitutional rights of freedom of speech, freedom of assembly, freedom of religious expression, and legal guarantees of fair trials were suspended under martial law.

== Doctrine ==
=== Anti-imperialism and Chinese nationalism ===
Chiang Kai-shek, the head of the Kuomintang, warned the Soviet Union and other foreign countries about interfering in Chinese affairs. He was personally angry at the way China was treated by foreigners, mainly by the Soviet Union, the United Kingdom, and the United States. Chiang's New Life Movement campaigned for the end of Soviet, Western, American, and other foreign influences in China. Chen Lifu, a CC Clique member of the KMT, said, "Communism originated from Soviet imperialism, which has encroached on our country." It was also noted that "the white bear of the North Pole is known for its viciousness and cruelty."

Chiang was also staunchly against imperialism and colonialism, and argued that China had no intent to replace Western imperialism with its own. He also viewed foreign powers, including the US, the USSR, and the Empire of Japan as imperialist powers that wanted to exploit China.

Chiang promoted strong Chinese nationalism throughout the territories controlled by the ROC as well as the ideological ideal of a unified "Dang Guo" (Party-state), to solidify its rule and ideological supremacy. Mandarin Chinese became the sole official language, and standard education curricula emphasized Chinese history with Confucianism culture.

As an opponent of Japanese imperialism, Chiang was a supporter of the Korean independence movement. Under the Nationalist government, the Provisional Government of the Republic of Korea received political asylum and support, and the secret militant branch Blue Shirts Society (BSS) supported left-wing nationalist Kim Won-bong and Kim-led Korean National Revolutionary Party.

To promote the cultural legitimacy of his regime in contrast to the PRC led by the Communists, which was engaging in the Great Proletarian Cultural Revolution, Chiang launched the Chinese Cultural Renaissance in Taiwan to promote Chinese culture and traditional values.

=== Cult of personality ===
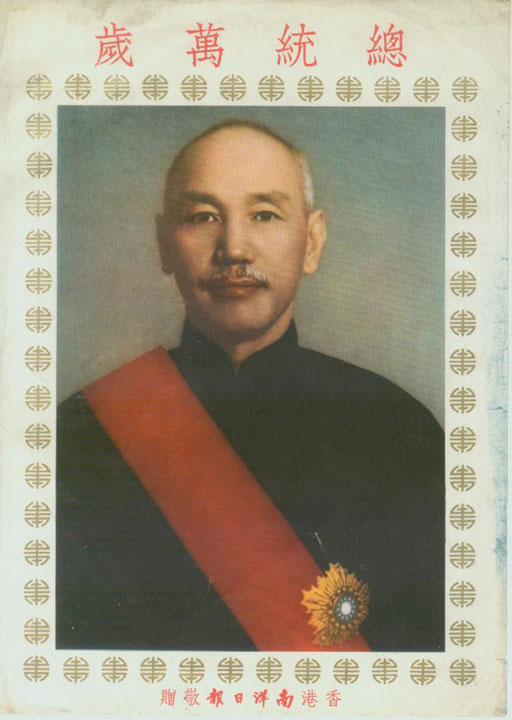
Chinese propaganda poster proclaiming "Long Live the President"

Chiang's portrait hung over Tiananmen Square until 1949, when it was displaced with Mao's portrait. His portrait is still displayed in Tiananmen Square, southeast of the Monument to the People's Heroes. Portraits of Chiang were common in private homes and in public on the streets. After his death, the Chiang Kai-shek Memorial Song was written in 1988 to commemorate Chiang Kai-shek. In Cihu, there are several statues of Chiang Kai-shek.

Chiang was popular among many people and dressed in plain, simple clothes, unlike contemporary Chinese warlords who dressed extravagantly.

Quotes from the Quran and hadith were used by Muslims in the Kuomintang-controlled Muslim publication, the Yuehua, to justify Chiang Kai-shek's rule over China. When the Muslim general and warlord Ma Lin was interviewed, he was described as having "high admiration for and unwavering loyalty to Chiang Kai-shek".

=== Modernisation ===
During the Nanjing decade, the Kuomintang sought to modernise the legal and penal systems and attempted to stabilise prices, amortise debts, reform the banking and currency systems, build railroads and motorways, improve public health facilities, legislate against traffic in narcotics, and augment industrial and agricultural production. Efforts were made to improve education standards, and the national academy of sciences, Academia Sinica, was founded.

The Chinese Rural Reconstruction Movement was implemented by some social activists who graduated as professors of the United States with tangible but limited progress in modernizing the tax, infrastructural, economic, cultural, and educational equipment and the mechanisms of rural regions. The social activists actively co-ordinated with the local governments in the towns and villages since the early 1930s. However, the policy was subsequently neglected and canceled by Chiang's government because of rampant wars and the lack of resources after the Japanese War and the civil war.

The Kuomintang supported women's suffrage and education and the abolition of polygamy and foot binding. Under Chiang's leadership, the Republic of China government also enacted a women's quota in the parliament with reserved seats for women. During the Nanjing Decade, access to standardised education increased the literacy rates across China. The Kuomintang purged China's education system of western ideas, introducing Confucianism into the curriculum. Education came under the total control of state, which meant, in effect, the Kuomintang party apparatus, via the Ministry of Education. Military and political classes on the Kuomintang's Three Principles of the People were added. Textbooks, exams, degrees and educational instructors were all controlled by the state, as were all universities. In Taiwan, Chiang promoted a nine-year free education and the importance of science in Taiwanese education and values. Those measures generated great success, with consistent and strong growth and the stabilization of inflation.

The Republic of China viewed new religious movements less favorably over time. Chiang pursued anti-cult measures, banning salvationist religious sects such as the Guiyidao, the Wushanshe, and the Fellowship of Goodness in 1928. Chiang ordered cracking down on the Yiguandao, and persecution continued until Taiwan's liberalisation. The Yiguandao were accused of collaborating with the invading Japanese forces, and were condemned by both the Kuomintang and the Communists.

=== Land reform and Georgism ===
Chiang, a committed adherent of the Three Principles of the People, supported attempts at land reform in-lieu of Georgist principles. In a 1924 interview with the New York American, reprinted in Land and Freedom, Chiang states:

We have neither capitalists nor great land owners. We have no problems that bother great industrial nations. We have only a land problem but no great landlords. We mean to adopt as a policy the rule that the government shall either tax or buy all lands according to values fixed by their owners. When the landlord has fixed the value and the Government has recorded it, the value of land the government does not buy increases. The increased value shall go to the government.

=== Anti-capitalism and socialism ===
The Kuomintang was a Chinese nationalist revolutionary party that had been supported by the Soviet Union. It was organized on Leninism. Contrary to the view that he was pro-capitalist, Chiang Kai-shek behaved in an antagonistic manner to the capitalists in China, often attacking them and confiscating their capital and assets for the use of the government.

Chiang cracked down on pro-communist unions and peasant organizations, and the wealthy Shanghai capitalists at the same time. Chiang Kai-shek continued Sun's anti-capitalist ideology. The Republic of China's media openly attacked the capitalists and capitalism, supporting a government-controlled economy instead of privately owned ones.

Historian Jay Taylor has noted that Chiang's hybrid revolutionary nationalism ideology is inspired by both the French republican movement and Confucianism. He described Chiang as a "left-leaning Confucian-Jacobinist".

Chiang believed that corruption and lack of morals were key reasons for the ROC's defeat in the civil war. He attempted to dismiss KMT members accused of corruption. Some major figures in the previous mainland Chinese government, such as Chiang's brothers-in-law H. H. Kung, T. V. Soong and nephew Chen Lifu, exiled themselves to the United States. In Taiwan, Chiang enacted the Land Reform Act, which doubled the land ownership of Taiwanese farmers and removed their rent burdens.

=== Anti-communism and fascist influences ===
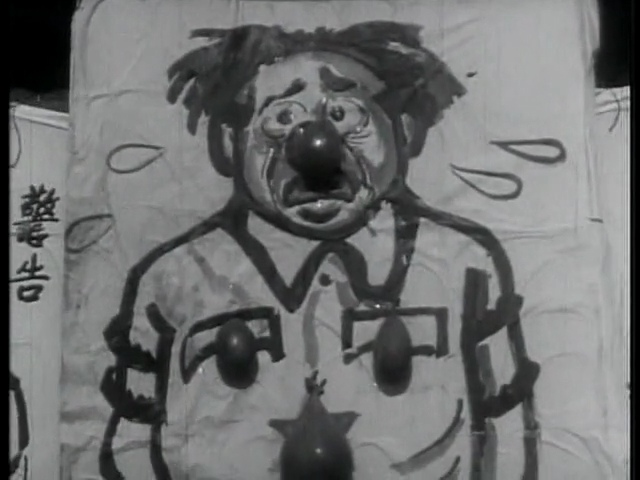
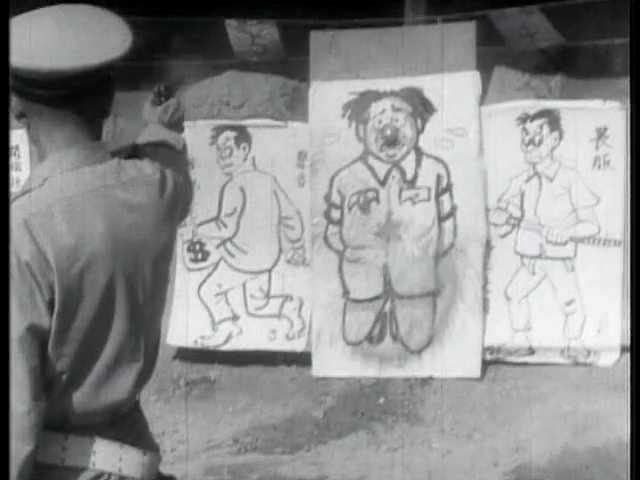
A official shooting performance under Chiang's rule including shooting a caricature of Chinese Communist leader Mao Zedong, as well as Chinese capitalists.

The Blue Shirts Society, also known under a variety of other names, has been described as one of the most relevant fascistic or ultranationalist groups in China at the time. It began as a secret society in the KMT military before being reformed within the party. By the 1930s, it had influence upon China's economy and society. Historian Jeffrey Crean notes, however, that the Blue Shirts impacted only elite politics, not the vast majority of China's population. The Blue Shirts held contempt for liberal democracy and stressed the political usefulness of violence. They were influenced by KMT contact with Nazi advisors and inspired by the German Brownshirts and the Italian Blackshirts. Unlike those organizations, however, the Blue Shirts were composed of political elites, not the popular masses. The later New Life Movement drew inspirations from the society, although some historians debate whether it is fascist.

Close Sino-German ties also promoted cooperation between Nazi Germany and the Nationalist government. The Kuomintang sought to build a one-party ideological state in China, called Dang Guo, to solidify its rule and ideological supremacy.

Chiang started the New Life Movement under Confucian ideals. It was a government-led civic campaign in the 1930s Republic of China to promote cultural reform and Neo-Confucian social morality and to ultimately unite China under a centralized ideology following the emergence of ideological challenges to the status quo. The movement itself was modeled on Confucianism, mixed with Christianity, nationalism, authoritarianism, and elements of fascism, rejecting individualism and liberalism. The Kuomintang launched the initiative on 19 February 1934 as part of an anti-communist campaign and soon enlarged the campaign to target all of China. Some historians regard this movement as imitating Nazism and regard this movement as being a neo-nationalistic movement used to elevate Chiang's control of everyday lives. Frederic Wakeman suggested that the New Life Movement was "Confucian fascism". In a 1935 speech, Chiang stated that "fascism is what China now most needs" and described fascism as the stimulant for a declining society. Mao once derogatorily compared Chiang to Adolf Hitler, referring to him as the "Führer of China".

Jay Taylor argues that Chiang's ideology does not espouse the general ideology of fascism despite his growing sympathies with fascist ideas in the 1930s. Chiang, in a 1945 speech, accused the Empire of Japan of fascism and ultra-militarism. A. James Gregor rejects categorizing it as fascist, arguing that the regime lacked the totalitarian mass mobilization of European fascism and functioned instead as a form of developmental nationalism or military authoritarianism.

The Sino-German relationship deteriorated as Germany failed to pursue a détente between China and Japan, which led to the outbreak of the Second Sino-Japanese War; China later declared war on the Axis powers in 1941. Despite the influences of fascism on the Kuomintang's ideology, some historians debate classifying Chiang's rule as fascist.

=== Authoritarian capitalism ===
After the government of the Republic of China moved to Taiwan, Chiang Kai-shek's economic policy turned towards to economic liberalism. He used Sho-Chieh Tsiang and other liberal economists to promote economic liberalization reforms in Taiwan.

However, Jay Taylor has noted that the developmental model of Chiangism in Taiwan still had elements of socialism, and the Gini index of Taiwan was around 0.28 by the 1970s, lower than the relatively equal West Germany. ROC (Taiwan) was one of the most equal countries in the pro-western bloc. The lower 40% income group doubled their income share to 22% of total income, with the upper 20% shrinking from 61% to 39%, compared to Japanese rule. The Chiangist economic model can be seen as a form of dirigisme or bureaucratic capitalism, with the state playing a crucial role in directing the market economy. Unlike most other major capitalist countries, small businesses and state-owned enterprises flourished under this economic model in Taiwan, but it did not see the emergence of corporate monopolies.

After the democratization of Taiwan, it began to slowly drift away from the Chiangist economic policy to embrace a more free market system as part of the economic globalization process under the context of neoliberalism.

=== Anti-separatism ===
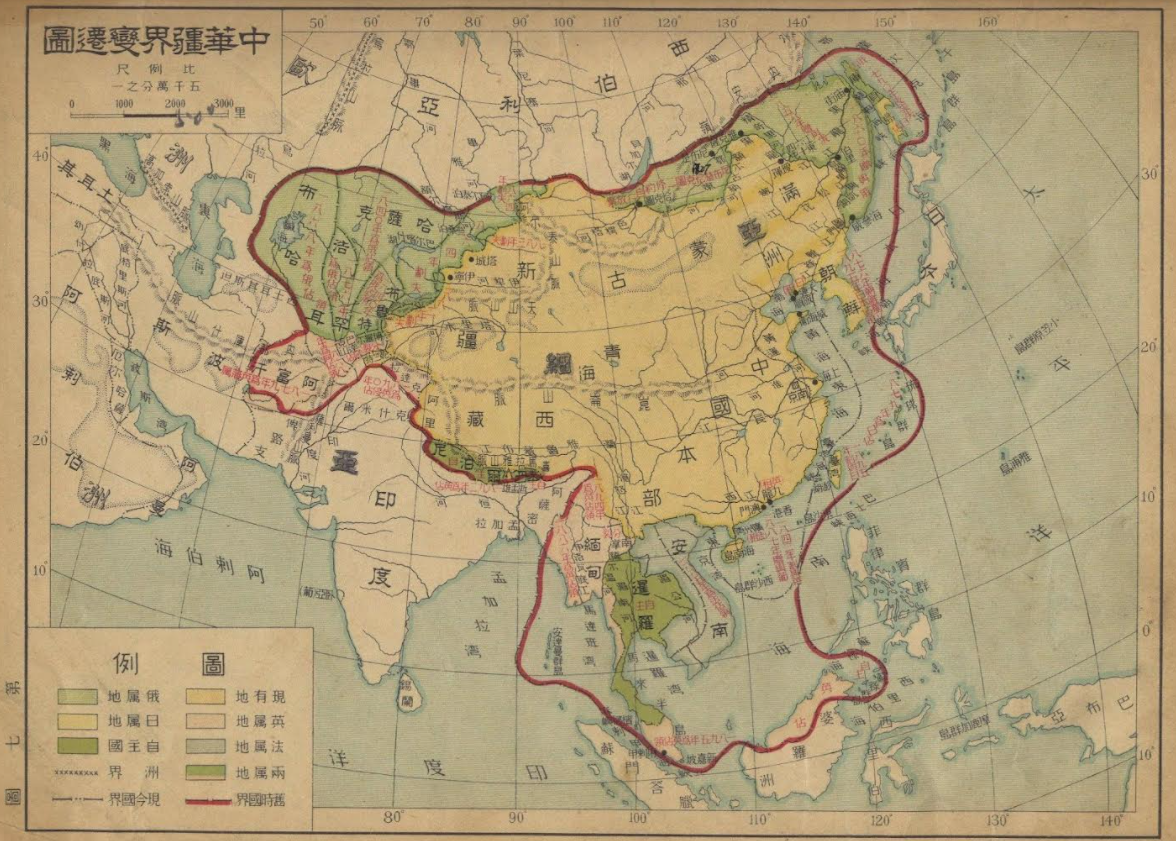
A map published in 1933 by the Nationalist government of the Republic of China, called the Map of National Shame. It depicts all the territories that China perceived to have lost control or influence over to the Western powers and Japan.

The Kuomintang (especially under the rule of Chiang), being anti-separatist, claims sovereignty over Outer Mongolia and Tuva as well as the territories of the modern People's Republic and Republic of China. Nationalist irredentism, especially in conceptions of "Greater China", were used by Kuomintang propaganda, especially calling for the reclamation of Taiwan from Japanese rule, and other territory taken by foreign powers.

== Legacy ==
The impact of Chiangism as an ideology can still be felt across both mainland China and Taiwan. Historian Rana Mitter argued that the People's Republic of China today is closer to Chiang's vision than to Mao's and wrote, "One can imagine Chiang Kai-shek's ghost wandering round China today nodding in approval, while Mao's ghost follows behind him, moaning at the destruction of his vision".

Various political parties across the Pan-Blue coalition continue to uphold the Three Principles of the People, as well as, at least partially, Chiang and his legacy. In the 21st century, these parties generally emphasize Chiang's role in defending Taiwan from communism and laying the groundwork for the Taiwan's economic development. While acknowledging the complexities of the authoritarian era, the Pan-Blue platform focuses on preserving the constitutional framework of the Republic of China and promoting the traditional Chinese cultural values as contrasted with mainland China (governed by the People's Republic of China).

Some fringe groups, including the National Socialism Association, a neo-Nazi Chinese ultranationalist group, publicly championed the rhetoric and philosophies of Chiangism.

== See also ==
- Economic history of Taiwan (Taiwan Miracle)
- The Generalissimo: Chiang Kai-shek and the Struggle for Modern China
- History of the Kuomintang
- Nanjing Decade
- Neoauthoritarianism (China)
- Radical anti-communism
- State nationalism#China
