= Authoritarian nationalism =

Nationalist ideology centered on centralized authority

Authoritarian nationalism is a political ideology that combines nationalist sentiment with an authoritarian governance structure. Unlike liberal or democratic nationalism, which seek to reconcile a national identity with democratic institutions, authoritarian nationalism regards political competition and civil dissent as inherent threats to the organic unity of the nation.

== Overview ==
Authoritarian nationalism has been defined as the synthesis of nationalist impulses-organized around a specific ethnic group, nationality, or cultural identity-and the consolidation of political power into an anti-democratic platform that represses individual freedoms of thought and action. The ideology typically centers authority in a charismatic leader, a single political party, or a small elite group, demanding absolute loyalty to a national identity that is framed as being under constant threat from internal or external enemies. This framework frequently incorporates statism (or state nationalism), wherein the state acts as the primary instrument of national advancement, intervening in economic and social spheres to align domestic resources with perceived national interests. National unity is prioritized above other political values, frequently resulting in the marginalization of minority groups perceived as obstacles to a singular national identity. Fascism is widely cited as a prominent example of radical and authoritarian nationalism.

Unlike earlier variants rooted in traditional elitism, the re-emergence of authoritarian nationalism in the 21st century is frequently characterized by reactionary and populist agendas that are anti-immigrant, anti-elite, and anti-intellectual. Scholarly analysis attributes this phenomenon to a combination of economic factors-such as rising inequality and disillusionment with globalization-alongside cultural anxieties produced by rapid social change. Although it most commonly manifests as right-wing movements characterized by racial supremacy or religious intolerance, authoritarian nationalism also encompasses post-imperialist aspirations and state-centered ideologies observed across diverse political contexts, including the United States, Russia, China, India, and Turkey.

== By country ==
=== China ===
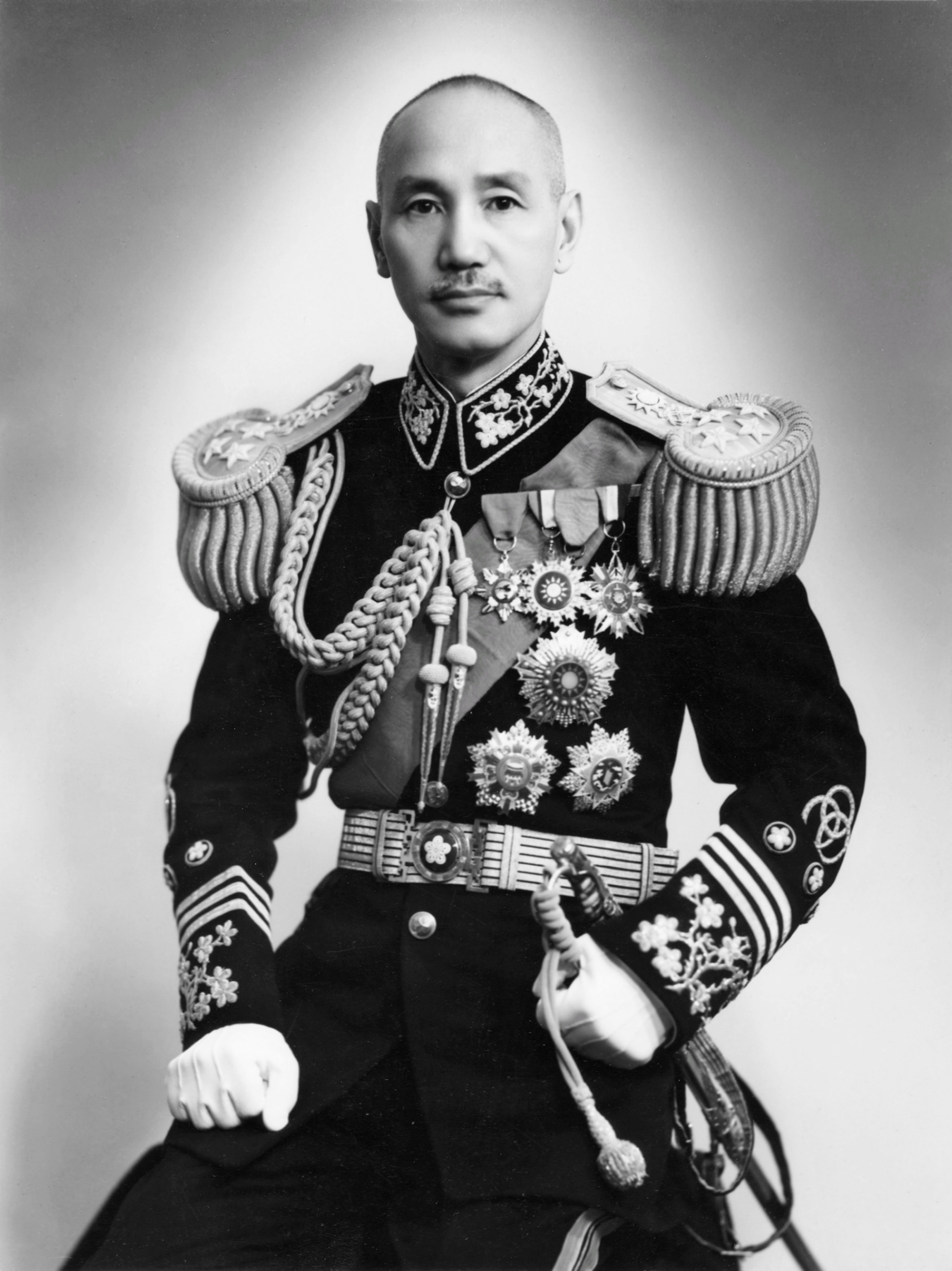
Chiang Kai-shek

==== Republic of China (1912–1949) ====
Under the leadership of Chiang Kai-shek and the Kuomintang, the Republic of China developed a form of authoritarian nationalism known as Chiangism. The ideology sought to unify the nation through the Three Principles of the People, emphasizing national sovereignty and cultural restoration. While it incorporated elements of social mobilization, it remained authoritarian conservative, relying on traditional Confucian values and military authority to counter both foreign imperialism and domestic communism.

==== People's Republic of China ====
The Chinese Communist Party (CCP), which has governed mainland China since 1949, moved away from orthodox communism through the Reform and Opening Up period of the 1980s, a shift that brought its ideological character closer to that of an authoritarian nationalist regime. Modern Chinese authoritarian nationalism draws on historical Confucian concepts of political legitimacy, particularly the "Mandate of Heaven".

Norwegian Sinologist Eske J. Møllgaard has identified an authoritarian nationalist tendency in Chinese political discourse, pointing to the influence of Liu Xiaofeng, a conservative intellectual who developed Leo Strauss's philosophy in a direction Møllgaard characterizes as "neo-fascist" and linked to the defense of traditional Chinese culture. American sociologist Berch Berberoglu identifies CCP general secretary Xi Jinping as one of several prominent authoritarian nationalist leaders in the contemporary world, alongside Vladimir Putin of Russia, Narendra Modi of India, and Recep Tayyip Erdoğan of Turkey.

=== Greece ===
The dictatorship of Ioannis Metaxas, who ruled Greece from 1936 to 1941, has been characterized as a form of authoritarian nationalism. Metaxism promoted the concept of the "Third Hellenic Civilization," seeking to revive ancient Greek and Byzantine values as the ideological foundation of the state. While the Metaxas government and its official doctrines are sometimes described as fascist, historians such as Stanley G. Payne classify it as a conventional authoritarian-conservative dictatorship, comparable to the regimes of Francisco Franco in Spain and António de Oliveira Salazar in Portugal.

=== Iran ===
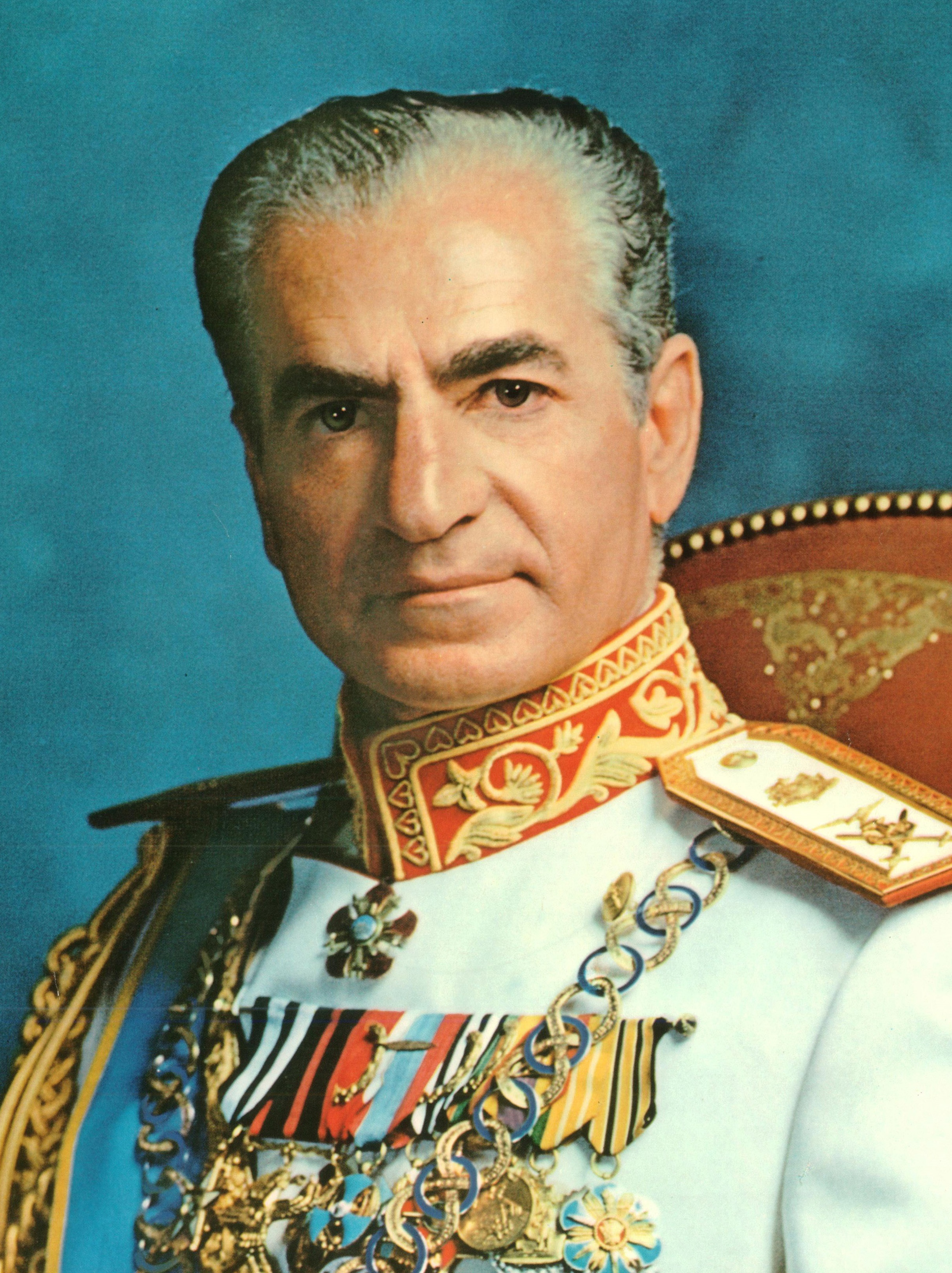
Mohammad Reza Shah Pahlavi

Pahlavi Iran's Reza Shah pursued secularism and modernization through a combination of authoritarianism and Iranian nationalism, a program often compared with the contemporaneous reforms of Turkey's Atatürk regime. His successor, Mohammad Reza Pahlavi, launched the White Revolution in 1963 as a program of accelerated modernization, which included significant redistribution of wealth from the aristocratic landlord class to Iran's working class and produced substantial economic growth in subsequent decades.

=== Japan ===
Western scholars including John Breuilly have analyzed the Meiji Restoration as founded on a basis of traditional authoritarian nationalism. In the mid-1930s, the Japanese military was divided between the Imperial Way Faction and the Control Faction; the more radical, anti-establishment, and ultranationalist Imperial Way Faction was responsible for the February 26 incident but was subsequently suppressed by the conservative Control Faction and the Japanese government. The Japanese military as a whole nonetheless initiated the Second Sino-Japanese War and the Pacific War, dismantled constitutional democracy, and established a para-fascist one-party system called the Imperial Rule Assistance Association in 1940.

=== Portugal ===
The Estado Novo regime, led by António de Oliveira Salazar, is regarded as a representative example of European authoritarian nationalism. Salazarism was organized around the motto "God, Fatherland, and Family," promoting a corporatist and conservative social order. Unlike the mass-mobilizing fascist regimes of Italy and Germany, Salazar's government pursued the depoliticization of society, maintaining the traditional influence of the Catholic Church and the landed elite rather than seeking popular mass participation.

=== Russia ===
Russian authoritarian nationalism has historically combined a strong centralized system with an emphasis on independent civilizational values as the basis for the unity and survival of the state. The doctrine of "Orthodoxy, Autocracy, and Nationality," formulated during the 19th-century reign of Nicholas I, stressed loyalty to the Emperor, the moral authority of the Orthodox Church, and the distinctiveness of Russian tradition in opposition to Western liberalism-a formulation known as "Official Nationalism". This ideological tradition has also been identified as an influence on the development of Putinism in the 21st century.

=== South Korea ===
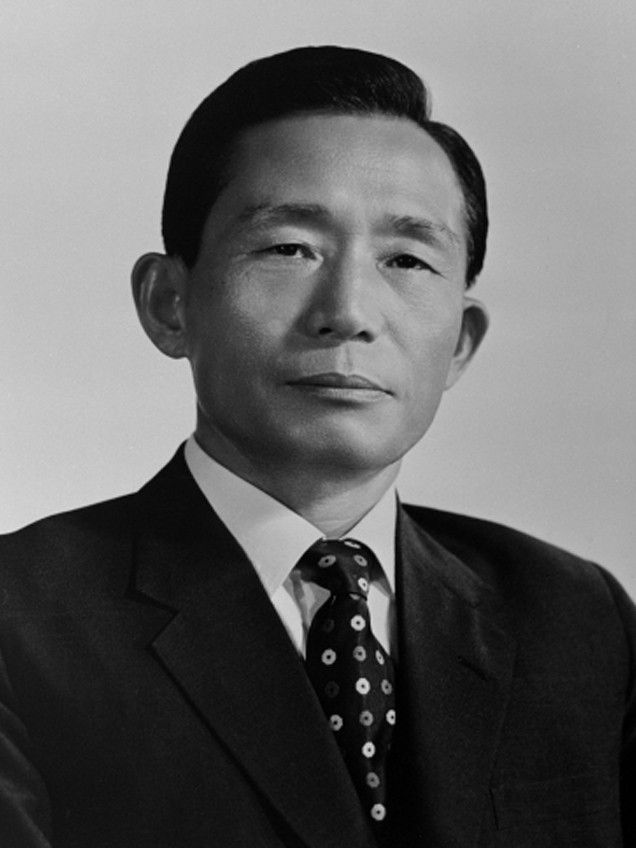
Park Chung Hee

Under Park Chung-hee, South Korea was governed according to a highly centralized form of authoritarian nationalism. This orientation was most pronounced during the Yushin period, during which the state subordinated political pluralism to the goals of rapid economic development-characterized as the "Miracle on the Han River"-and national security. The regime promoted the concept of "Korean-style democracy," presenting authoritarian rule as a necessary stage for national survival and modernization against the threat of North Korea.

=== Spain ===
Following the Spanish Civil War, Francisco Franco constructed a regime that united diverse nationalist factions under a single authoritarian structure. Francoism was ideologically grounded in the concept of National Catholicism, which identified the Spanish nation with the Catholic faith. Although the regime initially relied on the fascist Falange party, it evolved over time into a more traditional military-clerical dictatorship that prioritized stability, order, and the preservation of Spain's historical unity over mass political mobilization.

=== South Africa ===
During the apartheid era under South Africa's National Party, authoritarian nationalism was closely associated with white nationalism (particularly Afrikaner nationalism). In the contemporary period, scholars have also identified authoritarian nationalist characteristics in left-wing populist and black nationalist movements, including the Economic Freedom Fighters (EFF) and the uMkhonto weSizwe Party (MK).

=== Turkey ===
Mustafa Kemal Atatürk

In the early years of the Republic of Turkey, Mustafa Kemal Atatürk implemented a form of authoritarian nationalism centered on secularism and Westernization. Kemalism sought to transform the multi-ethnic Ottoman identity into a unified, modern Turkish national identity, with the state exercising significant control over political and social life to ensure the success of these reforms. A strong, unified nation-state was regarded as the necessary protection against fragmentation and foreign intervention.

== See also ==
- Authoritarian civic nationalism (or "state nationalism")
- Blue Shirts Society
- Illiberal democracy
- National conservatism
- Neo-nationalism
- Orbanism
- Right-wing populism
- Ultranationalism
