= Chiang Kai-shek Memorial Song =

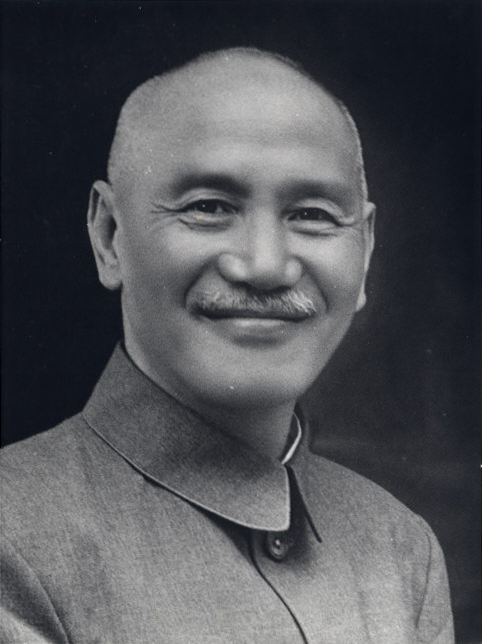
Official portrait of Chiang Kai-shek, 1955

The Chiang Kai-shek Memorial Song (Chinese: 蔣公紀念歌; Wade–Giles: chiang^{3}kung^{1} chi^{4}nien^{4} ko^{1}) was written to commemorate the Generalissimo and President Chiang Kai-shek of the Republic of China. There are two songs: the second song was written by Hwang Yau-tai or Huang Yu-ti (Huang Youdi, 黃友棣) in 1975, who later also wrote Chiang Ching-kuo Memorial Song in 1988.

"Chiang Kung Memorial Song" used to be sung in schools and was also popular with military song competitions; when Chiang Kai-shek died, this song was also played for one month as an act of mourning. However, with the democratization of politics, this song is no longer included in current music textbooks, and schools no longer teach this song. However, on Chiang Kai-shek's birthday and the Veterans' Day, veterans sing this to express their condolences; this song is also played on folk festivals.

== Official version ==
This was the officially adopted version of Chiang Kai-shek Memorial Song written by Li Chung-he and Zhang Ling.

Chinese characters

總統 蔣公
您是人類的救星
您是世界的偉人
總統 蔣公
您是自由的燈塔
您是民主的長城

𝄆 內除軍閥，外抗強鄰
爲正義而反共
圖民族之復興 𝄇
蔣公！蔣公！
您不朽的精神永遠領導我們
反共必勝，建國必成！
反共必勝，建國必成！

Zhuyin Fuhao

ㄗㄨㄥˇ ㄊㄨㄥˇ ㄐㄧㄤˇ ㄍㄨㄥ
ㄋㄧㄣˊ ㄕˋ ㄖㄣˊ ㄌㄟˋ ㄉㄜ˙ ㄐㄧㄡˋ ㄒㄧㄥ
ㄋㄧㄣˊ ㄕˋ ㄕˋ ㄐㄧㄝˋ ㄉㄜ˙ ㄨㄟˇ ㄖㄣˊ
ㄗㄨㄥˇ ㄊㄨㄥˇ ㄐㄧㄤˇ ㄍㄨㄥ
ㄋㄧㄣˊ ㄕˋ ㄗˋ ㄧㄡˊ ㄉㄜ˙ ㄉㄥ ㄊㄚˇ
ㄋㄧㄣˊ ㄕˋ ㄇㄧㄣˊ ㄓㄨˇ ㄉㄜ˙ ㄔㄤˊ ㄔㄥˊ
𝄆 ㄋㄟˋ ㄔㄨˊ ㄐㄩㄣ ㄈㄚˊ ， ㄨㄞˋ ㄎㄤˋ ㄑㄧㄤˊ ㄌㄧㄣˊ
ㄨㄟˊ ㄓㄥˋ ㄧˋ ㄦˊ ㄈㄢˇ ㄍㄨㄥˋ
ㄊㄨˊ ㄇㄧㄣˊ ㄗㄨˊ ㄓ ㄈㄨˋ ㄒㄧㄥ 𝄇
ㄐㄧㄤˇ ㄍㄨㄥ ！ ㄐㄧㄤˇ ㄍㄨㄥ ！
ㄋㄧㄣˊ ㄅㄨˋ ㄒㄧㄡˇ ㄉㄜ˙ ㄐㄧㄥ ㄕㄣˊ ㄩㄥˇ ㄩㄢˇ ㄌㄧㄥˇ ㄉㄠˇ ㄨㄛˇ ㄇㄣˊ
ㄈㄢˇ ㄍㄨㄥˋ ㄅㄧˋ ㄕㄥˋ ， ㄐㄧㄢˋ ㄍㄨㄛˊ ㄅㄧˋ ㄔㄥˊ ！
ㄈㄢˇ ㄍㄨㄥˋ ㄅㄧˋ ㄕㄥˋ ， ㄐㄧㄢˋ ㄍㄨㄛˊ ㄅㄧˋ ㄔㄥˊ ！

Hanyu Pinyin

Zǒngtǒng Jiǎnggōng
Nín shì rénlèi de jiùxīng
Nín shì shìjiè de wěirén
Zǒngtǒng Jiǎnggōng
Nín shì zìyóu de dēngtǎ
Nín shì mínzhǔ de chángchéng
𝄆 Nèi chú jūnfá, wài kàng qiánglín
Wèi zhèngyì ér fǎngòng
Tú mínzú zhī fùxīng! 𝄇
Jiǎnggōng! Jiǎnggōng!
Nín bùxiǔ de jīngshen yǒngyuǎn lǐngdǎo wǒmen
Fǎngòng bì shèng, jiànguó bì chéng!
Fǎngòng bì shèng, jiànguó bì chéng!

Translation

President General Chiang
You are the savior of mankind
You are the greatest person in the world
President General Chiang
You are the lighthouse of freedom
You are the Great Wall of democracy
𝄆 You eliminated the warlords, fought foreign aggression,
and opposed communism for righteousness to seek the renaissance of our nation 𝄇
General Chiang, General Chiang
Your everlasting spirit will forever guide us
Anti-communism must win state-building must succeed!
Anti-communism must win, state-building must succeed!

== Initial version ==
The initial version was written by 秦孝儀 (Chin Hsiao-I) and 黃友棣 (Hwang Yau-tai) shortly after Chiang's death. However this version was officially replaced by the officially adopted version written by Li Chung-he (李中和) and Zhang Ling (張齡).

Compared to the officially adopted version, this version was written in vernacular language and was longer in context. The melody was also completely different.

Chinese lyrics

翳惟總統， 武嶺 蔣公，巍巍蕩蕩，民無能名！巍巍蕩蕩， 民無能名！

革命實繼志中山，篤學則接武陽明，黃埔怒濤，奮墨絰而耀日星，重慶精誠，製白梃以撻堅甲利兵，使百萬之眾輸誠何易，使渠帥投服復皆不受敵之脅從，使十數刀殂帝國，取消不平等條約，而卒使之平，使驕妄強敵畏威懷德，至今尚猶感激涕零。

南陽諸葛，汾陽子儀，猶當愧其未之能行！

以新生活育我民德，以憲政之治植我民主，以經濟建設厚我民生，以九年國民教育俾我民智益蒸。倫理、民主、科學、革命、實踐，力行，中華文化於焉復興！

奈何奸匪叛亂，大陸如沸如焚，中懷饑溺，臥火抱冰，乃眷西顧，日邁月征。如何天不悔(諱)禍，一旦奪我元戎，滄海雨泣，神州晦冥，孤臣孽子， 攀木腐心！孤臣孽子，攀木腐心！

化沉哀為震雷，合眾志為長風，縱九死而不悔，願神明兮鑒臨，誓誅此大奸元惡，誓復我四明兩京，誓弭此大辱慘禍，誓收我河洛燕雲。

錦水長碧，蔣山長青，翳惟總統，武嶺 蔣公，巍巍蕩蕩，民無能名！巍巍蕩蕩，民無能名！

Hanyu Pinyin

Yì wéi zǒngtǒng, wǔ lǐng jiǎng gōng, wéiwéi dàngdàng, mín wúnéng míng! Wéiwéi dàngdàng, mín wúnéng míng!

Gémìng shí jì zhì zhōngshān, dǔ xué zé jiē wǔ yángmíng, huángbù nùtāo, fèn mò dié ér yào rì xīng, chóngqìng jīngchéng, zhì bái tǐng yǐ tà jiān jiǎ lì bīng, shǐ bǎi wàn zhī zhòng shū chéng hé yì, shǐ qú shuài tóu fú fù jiē bù shòudí zhī xié cóng, shǐ shí shù dāo cú dìguó, qǔxiāo bù píngděng tiáoyuē, ér zú shǐ zhī píng, shǐ jiāo wàng qiángdí wèi wēi huái dé, zhìjīn shàng yóu gǎnjītìlíng.

Nányáng zhūgé, fén yángzi yí, yóu dāng kuì qí wèi zhī néng xíng! Yǐ xīn shēnghuó yù wǒ mín dé, yǐ xiànzhèng zhī zhì zhí wǒ mínzhǔ, yǐ jīngjì jiànshè hòu wǒ mínshēng, yǐ jiǔ nián guómín jiàoyù bǐ wǒ mínzhì yì zhēng. Lúnlǐ, mínzhǔ, kēxué, gémìng, shíjiàn, lìxíng, zhōnghuá wénhuà yú yān fùxīng!

Nàihé jiān fěi pànluàn, dàlù rú fèi rú fén, zhōng huái jī nì, wò huǒ bào bīng, nǎi juàn xī gù, rì mài yuè zhēng. Rúhé tiān bù huǐ (huì) huò, yīdàn duó wǒ yuánróng, cānghǎi yǔ qì, shénzhōu huì míng, gū chén niè zi, pān mù fǔxīn! Gū chén niè zi, pān mù fǔxīn!

Huà chén āi wéi zhèn léi, hé zhòng zhì wèi cháng fēng, zòng jiǔsǐ ér bù huǐ, yuàn shénmíng xī jiàn lín, shì zhū cǐ dà jiān yuán è, shì fù wǒ sì míng liǎng jīng, shì mǐ cǐ dà rǔ cǎnhuò, shì shōu wǒ hé luò yàn yún.

Jǐn shuǐ cháng bì, jiǎng shān cháng qīng, yì wéi zǒngtǒng, wǔ lǐng jiǎng gōng, wéiwéi dàngdàng, mín wúnéng míng! Wéiwéi dàngdàng, mín wúnéng míng!

English translation

Our President, Chiang Kai-shek, from Wuling; his great achievement, people cannot describe it by words! His great achievement, people cannot describe it by words!

He carried on the revolutionary spirit of Sun Yat-sen, and inherited the studious spirit of Wang Yangming;
he took up the leadership of Whampoa Military Academy and aided Sun Yat-sen to fight against the warlords even during his mourning of her mother's death; he built up sincerity when he relocated the capital to Chongqing to fight against the Japanese invaders with just only inferior arms.

To defeat millions of enemies was not easy, and he made the young Marshal not threatened by the enemy.
He repealed all unequal treaties from the Empires, and established equality; in return he was generous to the enemy after their defeat, and today they are still grateful.

Zhuge Liang of Nanyang, Guo Ziyi of Fenyang, none of them can even compare to him!

His New Life Movement nurtured people's virtues, and used constitutionalism to plant democracy; by economic construction enriching people's livelihood; and Nine-Year Compulsory Education to cultivate people's intelligence.
Ethics, democracy, science, revolution - to fulfill, and practice them, and Chinese culture has revived ever since (in Taiwan)!

But the traitors started a rebellion, and the whole of Mainland is boiling and burning; people were hungry and drowning in the heart, like lying on the fire and holding the ice; so he watched westwards back to Mainland, and he awaited the liberation of mainland territories, as the time passes by. What should we do to not let God bring disaster - once they took his own life. Seas and rain weep, China falls into darkness, all the helpless people in the country wondered in depression!

(We should:) Turn grief into thunder, unite people's ambition into distant winds, and never regret even if I die, and may God witness the truth; (We) vow to eliminate the treacherous culprit, to retake Ningbo, Nanjing and Beiping; (we) vow to eliminate this shameful disaster, and to restore the lost territories!

Splendid rivers (in the mainland) still remained verdue, Zijin Mountain in Nanjing still remained green; our President, Chiang Kai-shek, from Wuling; his great achievement, people cannot describe it by words! His great achievement, people cannot describe it by words!

== See also ==
- National Chiang Kai-shek Memorial Hall
- Chiang Kai-shek statues
- Cihu
- Hwang Yau-tai
- 800 Heroes Song
