= The Generalissimo: Chiang Kai-shek and the Struggle for Modern China =

Non-fiction book

- Author: Jay Taylor
- Language: American English
- Genre: biography
- Publisher: Shanghai Literature and Art Publishing House
- Publication date: April 15, 2009
- Publication place: United States

The Generalissimo: Chiang Kai-shek and the Struggle for Modern China (Chinese: 蔣介石與現代中國的奮鬥), is a biography of Chiang Kai-shek that appeared in 2009, and is considered to be a powerful study of Chiang Kai-shek's life, ideology, historical position, and influence in later generations.

Published by Harvard University Press, it is written by Jay Taylor, a retired American Foreign Service Officer.

== Overview ==
One of the major events in world history in the 20th century was the unification, modernization and emergence of China as a world power. Chiang Kai-shek, as an authoritarian, modernizer, and neo-Confucian, made decisive contributions to the unification of China and Second Sino-Japanese War.

In 1949, after the civil war between Second Chinese Civil War, Chiang moved his regime to Taiwan and thus ruled Taiwan for 25 years. During this period, Chiang imposed martial law on Taiwan, led Taiwan to participate in the Cold War, tightly controlled inflation and political corruption, implemented land reform, realized income growth, and implemented universal health insurance and free compulsory education. In Taiwan, Chiang practiced and realized the modernization ideals and plans he had made in mainland China.

Jeremy Brown, Times Literature Supplement, made the following assessments for the book: "Taylor succeeds in recovering a complicated man who was responsible for military and economic success as well as stunning failures… The Generalissimo is now the best English-language biography available. Taylor has considerable narrative skills, and is the first Western biographer to have drawn on Chiang Kai-shek’s handwritten diaries."

Wei Bingbing, research fellow, Research Office of the History of Sino-Foreign Relations, Institute of Modern History, Chinese Academy of Social Sciences, commented that Taylor's book contains spelling and dating errors, and the notes do not correspond to the main text, but it is indeed the most scholarly biography of Chiang Kai-shek in English so far (2017).

== Author ==
Jay Taylor is a veteran American diplomat, scholar, and China expert, who was stationed in Taipei in the 1960s to provide analysis for the U.S. government, and therefore had the opportunity to meet Chiang Kai-shek in person before leaving Taiwan in 1965. After the establishment of diplomatic relations between China and the U.S., he worked at the U.S. Embassy in Beijing. He later became deputy director of intelligence at the U.S. Department of State, and is now a fellow at Harvard University's Fitzherbert Fitzgerald Research Center.

Author considers Chiang Kai-shek to be the "ultimate survivor", believes that Chiang's greatest wish was for China to be united, rich and strong, and believes in the phrase "secret envoys across the Taiwan Strait". He believes that Chiang's efforts paved the way for China's rapid modernization.

== Selected reviews ==
- Anderson, Perry (2012). "Sino-Americana. Review of Deng Xiaoping and the Transformation of China by Vogel, E., on China by Kissinger, H. And the Generalissimo: Chiang Kai-Shek and the Struggle for Modern China by Taylor, J." London Review of Books [Online]. 34 (3): 20–22.
- Buck, David D. (2010). "Jay Taylor Finds Rehabilitating Chiang Kai-Shek's Reputation No Small Task". China Review International. 17 (1): 1–8. doi:10.1353/cri.2010.0011. JSTOR 23734344.
- Fung, Edmund S K (2010). "Jay Taylor. The Generalissimo: Chiang Kai-Shek and the Struggle for Modern China". The American Historical Review. 115 (2): 517–518. doi:10.1086/ahr.115.2.517.
- Hayford, Charles (2011). "The "Final Triumph of Chiang Kai-Shek? The Rush to Revisionism: Review of the Generalissimo: Chiang Kai-Shek and the Struggle for Modern China. Cambridge, Mass.: Belknap Press of Harvard University Press, 2009" (PDF). H-Diplo Review FORUM: s.
- Tzu-chin, Huang (2016). "Embracing Mainstream International Society: Chiang Kai-Shek's Diplomatic Strategy against Japan". Chinese Studies in History. 49 (4): 199–217. doi:10.1080/00094633.2015.1214511. S2CID 159825097.
- Kapp, R. A. and G. van der Wees (2010). "The Generalissimo: Chiang Kai-Shek and the Struggle for Modern China, by Jay Taylor". Journal of Military History. 74 (1): 201–203.
- Mirsky, Jonathan (2009). "The Generalissimo: Chiang Kai-Shek and the Struggle for Modern China - Jay Taylor". The Literary Review: 5.
- Tanner, Harold M. (2010). "A Question of Influence: Jay Taylor's the Generalissimo and American Images of Chiang Kai-Shek". The Chinese Historical Review. 17 (1): 37–42. doi:10.1179/tcr.2010.17.1.37. S2CID 144277599.
- Taylor, Jeremy E. and Grace C. Huang (2012). ""Deep Changes in Interpretive Currents"? Chiang Kai-Shek Studies in the Post-Cold War Era". International Journal of Asian Studies. 9 (1): 99–121. doi:10.1017/S1479591411000209. S2CID 145375348.
- Thompson, Roger (2009). "Review of the Generalissimo: Chiang Kai-Shek and the Struggle for Modern China, by Jay Taylor". Journal of Historical Biography. 6: 98–105.
- Yee, Wah Foo (2009). "Fu Bingchang, Chiang Kai-Shek and Yalta". Cold War History. 9 (3): 389–409. doi:10.1080/14682740902978995. S2CID 218578218.
