= Chiang Kai-shek statues =

Statues of the President of the Republic of China

Generalissimo Chiang Kai-shek statue in Cihu.

Chiang Kai-shek statues (Chinese: 蔣公銅像; pinyin: Jiǎng Gōng Tóngxiàng; lit. 'bronze statues of President Chiang' or Chinese: 蔣介石雕像; pinyin: Jiǎng Jièshí diāoxiàng) are statues of the late Republic of China (ROC) President Chiang Kai-shek. They are found almost everywhere in Taiwan, from parks to schools to military bases, and are usually made of a bronze alloy, although it varies from location to location.

Some statues have been removed starting in 1999, with greater publicity surrounding removals starting in 2007 under pro-Taiwan independence Democratic Progressive Party (DPP)-led government initiatives, which in turn led to protests and opposition on the grounds of culture and history. Many Chiang statues have since been relocated to a central location and placed in a memorial garden. Since the movement to remove Chiang statues began, individual vigilantes have begun to vandalize the statues, typically coincident with the anniversary of the 228 Incident.

== History ==
President Chiang Kai-shek led the Republic of China and the Kuomintang (KMT) in the Mainland. After the end of World War II, during the subsequent resumption of the Chinese Civil War he lost Mainland China to the Chinese Communists. He retreated to Taiwan with the ROC government and vowed to one day re-take the Mainland (At that time, the ROC had occupied Taiwan before the post-war treaties were in effect, becoming the government in exile.) During the following years of rule, the KMT-led ROC government erected monuments commemorating Nationalist leaders, including statues of Chiang Kai-shek.

== Statue removal ==
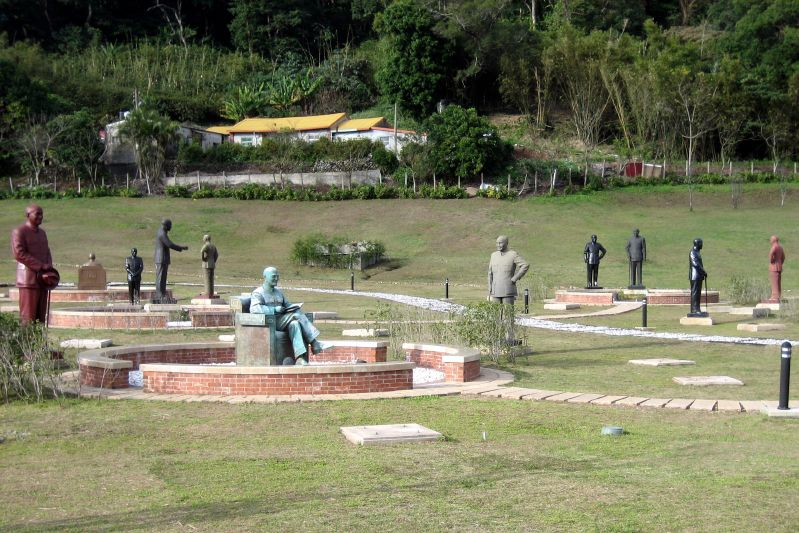
Many statues of Chiang throughout Taiwan have been removed to Cihu Mausoleum, the mausoleum of Chiang Kai-shek, in the "Garden of the Generalissimos".

In 2000, it was estimated there were nearly 43,000 Chiang statues in various locations throughout Taiwan. Daxi District, home to the mausoleums of Chiang Kai-shek and his son, Chiang Ching-kuo, has accepted approximately 200 removed Chiang Kai-shek statues, beginning in 2000 as per the then-current mayor (Tzeng Rung-chien)'s policy. The statues were later displayed at the Cihu Memorial Sculpture Garden (慈湖紀念雕塑公園), located at 24.8415°N 121.2940°E adjacent to the Cihu Mausoleum. It is also known among expat residents as the 'Garden of the Generalissimos'. The garden is especially popular with visitors from the People's Republic of China.

Although the removal of Chiang statues received a great deal of attention, the actual number of statues moved to and subsequently displayed in Cihu is relatively low (approximately 150) compared to the estimated 43,000 statues erected. Other sources state that thousands of statues have been removed. The high-profile statues that have been removed, such as the Kaohsiung seated bronze Chiang statue, have garnered extensive press coverage. However, there are still many Chiang statues remaining in Taiwan, where they continue to watch over public squares, schools, and parks.

=== DPP administration ===
The Ministry of National Defense first proposed removing Chiang statues from military bases in March 2006 as part of a broader nationwide effort to de-politicize the military, although the ostensible reason given was to protect them from erosion and damage. In February 2007, the Republic of China government, under the Taiwan independence-minded DPP Chen Shui-bian administration, began to implement the plan to remove the Chiang statues from military premises. The ruling Democratic Progressive Party claimed that the statues symbolized Chiang Kai-shek's authoritarian rule and cult of personality and were not consistent with the principles of a representative democracy. The opposition KMT, on the other hand, resisted the removal of the statues, claiming that the DPP was attempting to cut off Taiwan's Chinese heritage, and distort history.

On March 9, 2007, the KMT revoked Defense Minister Lee Jye's party membership for removing the statues as ordered by the government. The party stated Lee's actions damaged the party's image. In response, Lee said he regretted the party's expulsion decision, but that he had no plans to join the DPP.

In the midst of these events, during March 2007, the large seated bronze statue of Chiang in the city of Kaohsiung's Chiang Kai-shek Cultural Center was removed.

=== Wounds and Regeneration ===
The March 12, 2007 removal of the seated bronze statue in Kaohsiung led to clashes between protestors who were against the removal, and police, who were sent to secure the site while city workers dismantled the statue. The statue was scheduled to be delivered to Cihu, Daxi Township in Taoyuan County (now Daxi District, Taoyuan City). Before the delivery, on March 15, 2007, the mayor of Daxi, Su Wen-sheng, left for Xikou, Zhejiang, in the People's Republic of China, to ask the mayor of Xikou if he would accept the statue. The deputy director of the Taiwan Affairs Office of Zhejiang Province, Shao Jiangwei, stated the offer was being considered favorably. However, when the statue arrived at Daxi in 79 segmented pieces (originally and erroneously reported as more than 200 pieces), the plan to transfer the statue to Xikou was abandoned.

Instead, the 8 m statue was partially reassembled at Cihu by a local artist, Guo Shao-zong, with some missing pieces and unveiled on March 15, 2008. The resulting deconstructionist sculpture, now entitled Wounds and Regeneration is one of the most popular statues in the park.

=== Chiang Kai-shek Memorial Hall ===
Discussions to remove or relocate the 10 m seated Chiang at the Chiang Kai-shek Memorial Hall started in 2007, followed by the renaming of the memorial hall in March 2007. In response, the Taipei City Government classified the memorial hall (including the statue) as a temporary historical site, which prevented any alteration or damage, and the KMT held a protest to oppose the proposed changes. Prompted by the removal of Chiang statues at other sites, some groups agitated for removal of the Chiang statue in July 2007 to coincide with other changes at the memorial hall.

The renaming of the memorial hall proceeded, but the statue was not removed or covered up, as had been speculated, when the newly named National Taiwan Democracy Memorial Hall re-opened in January 2008. Instead, the statue and its surroundings were decorated with many kites to reflect the theme of "a democratic wind." The kites were removed later that year, but other democracy-related decorations remained, prompting a statement of regret from Chiang's grandson John Chiang. In August 2008, the Executive Yuan withdrew proposed statutes to make the name change permanent, and the memorial hall reverted to its original name, likely ending any threat to remove the Chiang statue inside.

In 2017, the Ministry of Culture stated it was drafting a bill to rename the Hall and remove the symbols of authoritarian rule, including the Chiang statue within. Cheng Tzu-tsai called for the demolition of the Hall in 2018 calling it a reminder of autocratic rule.

=== School campus removals ===
Since 2008, at least two more Chiang statues have been removed from university campuses. A Chiang statue was moved from the front gate of National Taiwan Normal University in 2011, following debate over the statue's fate dating as far back as 1987, and another Chiang statue was moved from the campus at National Cheng Kung University in 2013. During protests memorializing the 228 Incident in 2016, Chiang statues at National Chengchi University were vandalized, and as a result, the administration passed a resolution in early 2017 calling for the removal of all Chiang statues from the campus.

In 2014, a student-led campaign was launched advocating the removal of all Chiang statues from high school campuses.

Four were arrested at Fu Jen Catholic University early on February 28, 2017 for attempting to pull down a bronze Chiang statue using an angle grinder. Charges against the four for obstructing the police were later dropped, as the four had not resisted arrest.

=== City policies ===
Shortly after entering office in November 2014, mayor Twu Shiing-jer ordered the removal of Chiang statues within Chiayi.

In March 2015, Tainan removed Chiang statues from fourteen elementary and junior high school campuses and sent them to Daxi at Mayor William Lai's (DPP) direction. Lai announced the plan to remove the statues on 28 February 2015, during an event marking the 68th anniversary of the 228 Incident, stating the removal was both to avoid the annual vandalism of Chiang statues and to lift the symbols of autocratic rule in Taiwan. KMT Tainan city councilors criticized the secretive manner in which the Chiang statues were removed, and compared Lai to ISIS for wholesale destruction of cultural artifacts.

The next day, the mayors of Taipei (Ko Wen-je) and Keelung (Lin Yu-chang) demurred on removing their cities' Chiang statues, seeking to avoid confrontation, while the mayor of Taoyuan City (Cheng Wen-tsan) stated the Chiang statues on Taoyuan's school campuses and public offices would be sent to Daxi. Keelung reversed its position a week later, declaring that its Chiang statues would be removed in the near future. Pro-independence activists threatened to file a lawsuit to remove Chiang statues from Taipei in a statement released in October 2015.

=== Other policies ===
Late in March 2015, DPP legislator Pasuya Yao proposed a nationwide removal of Chiang statues, and further proposed that new currency should be issued to eliminate images of Chiang from the NT$1, 5 and 10 coins and the NT$200 bill.

In April 2017, the stone statue of Chiang in Yangmingshan was beheaded by a group claiming retaliation for the earlier beheading of a statue of Japanese engineer Yoichi Hatta. The head of the Chiang statue was not recovered. One day later, Yao drafted a bill to rename the Chiang Kai-shek Memorial Hall and to remove all Chiang statues nationwide to Daxi.

== Case of another country ==
The relocation of Chiang statues has been suggested as a model to follow for a peaceful alternative fate for Confederate statuary.

Attempts to demolish or relocate Chiang statues contrast with the phenomenon of an increase in Syngman Rhee or Park Chung-hee statues since 2009 in South Korea. South Korea's left-leaning Kyunghyang Shinmun criticized South Korean conservatives, including New Right activists, who are pushing for the establishment of statues about dictators, and gave a positive review of Taiwan's case.

== Gallery ==
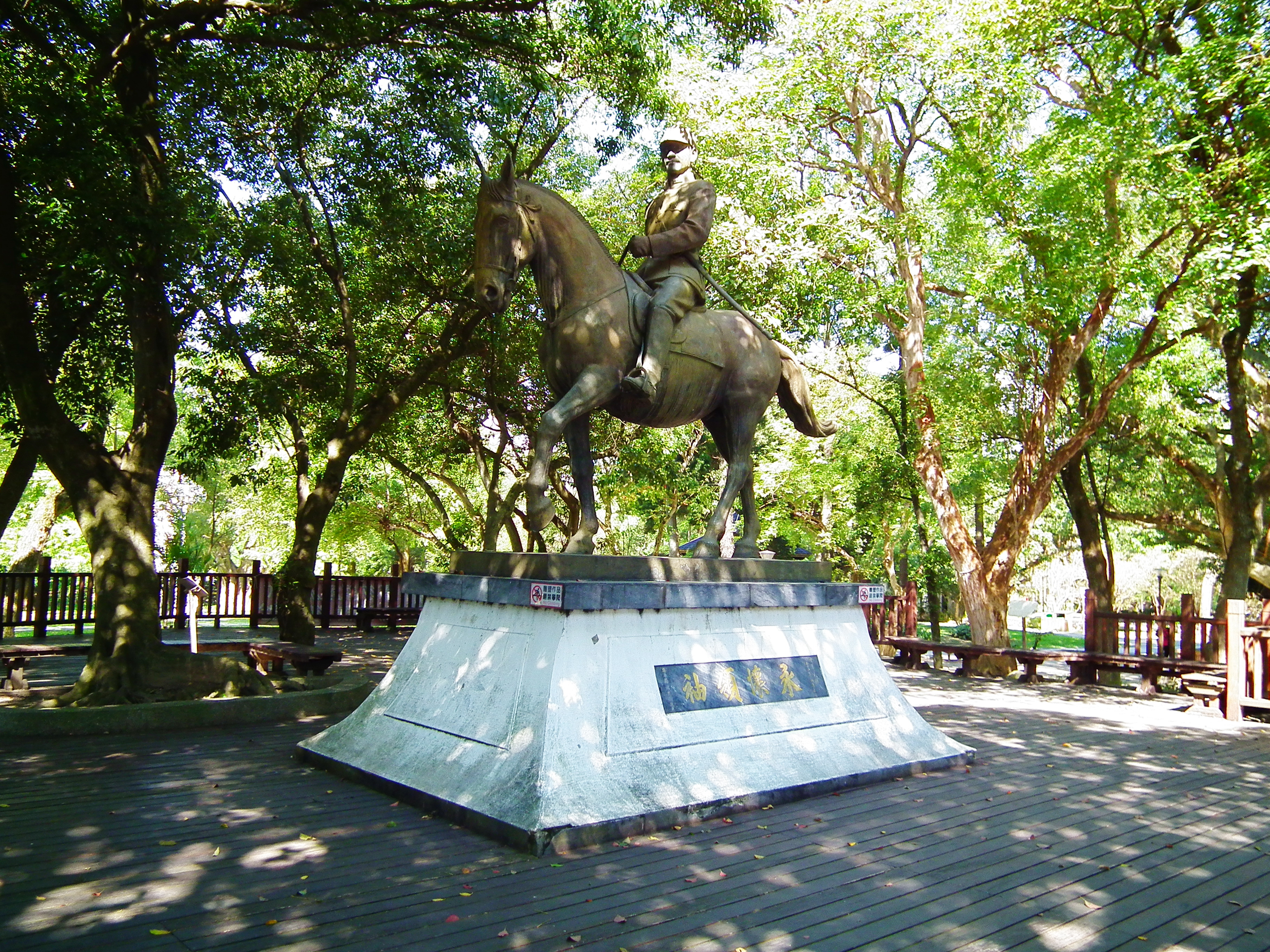
Seated on a horse, Daxi Park

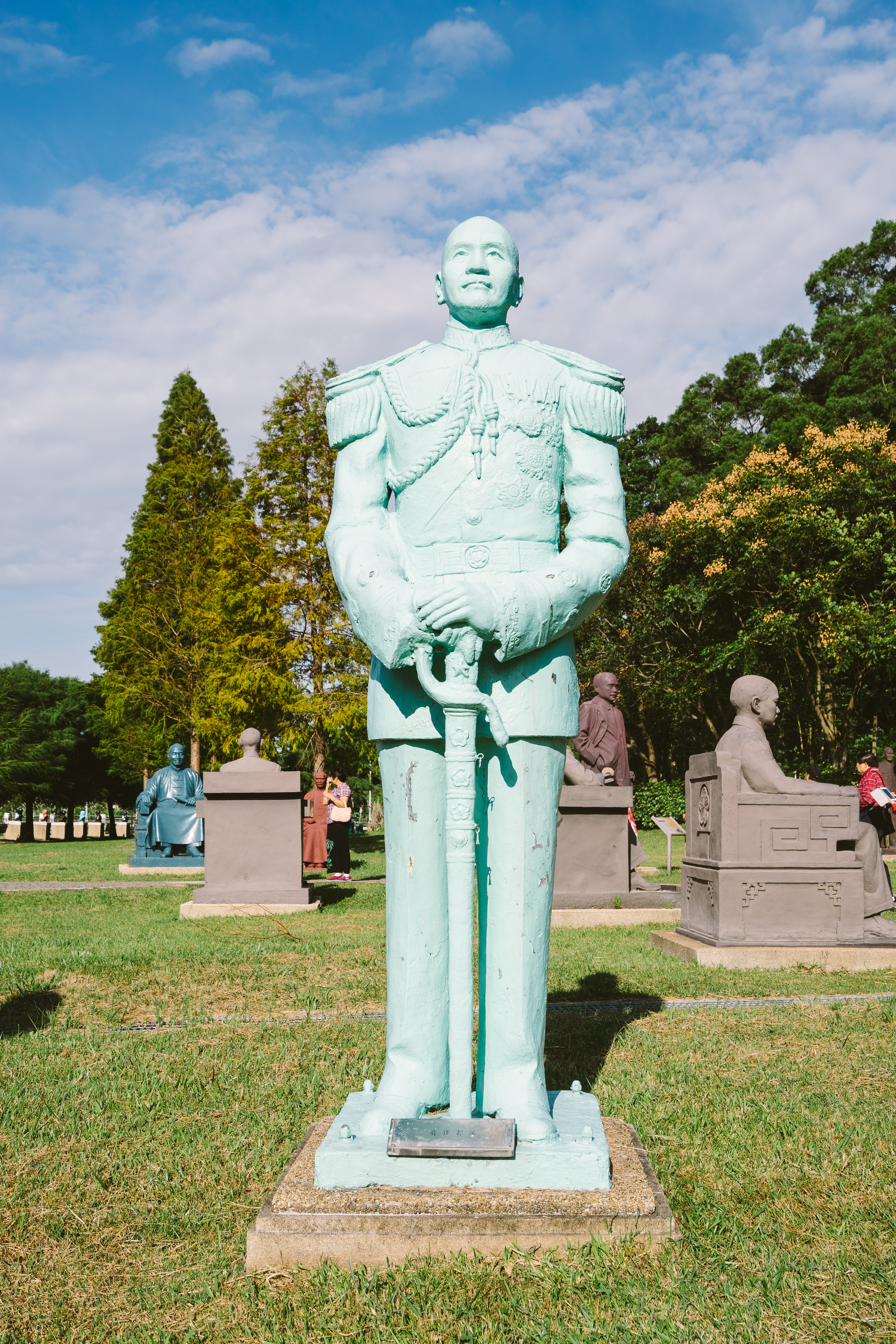
Standing with sword, Cihu

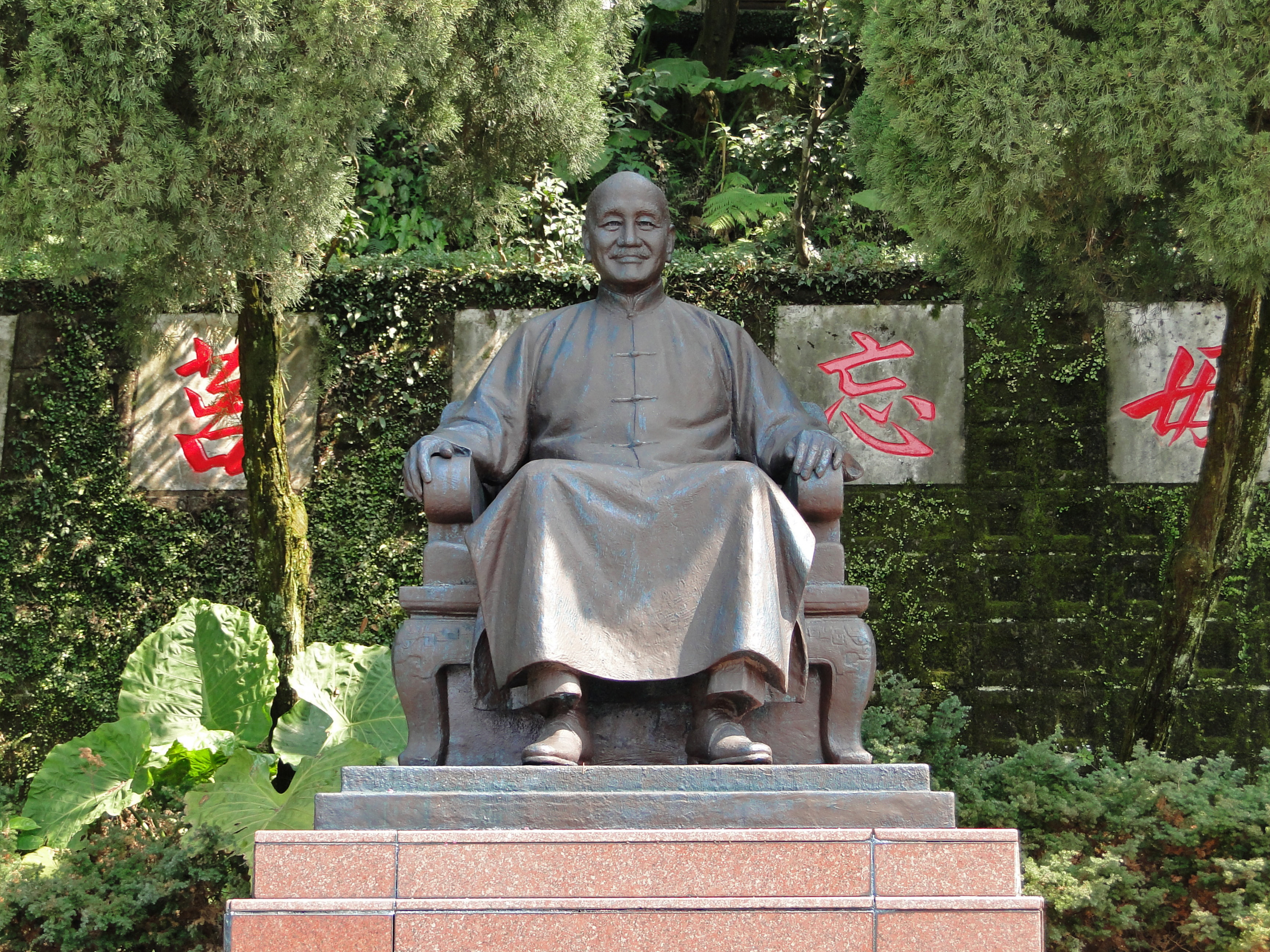
Seated, Yangmingshan

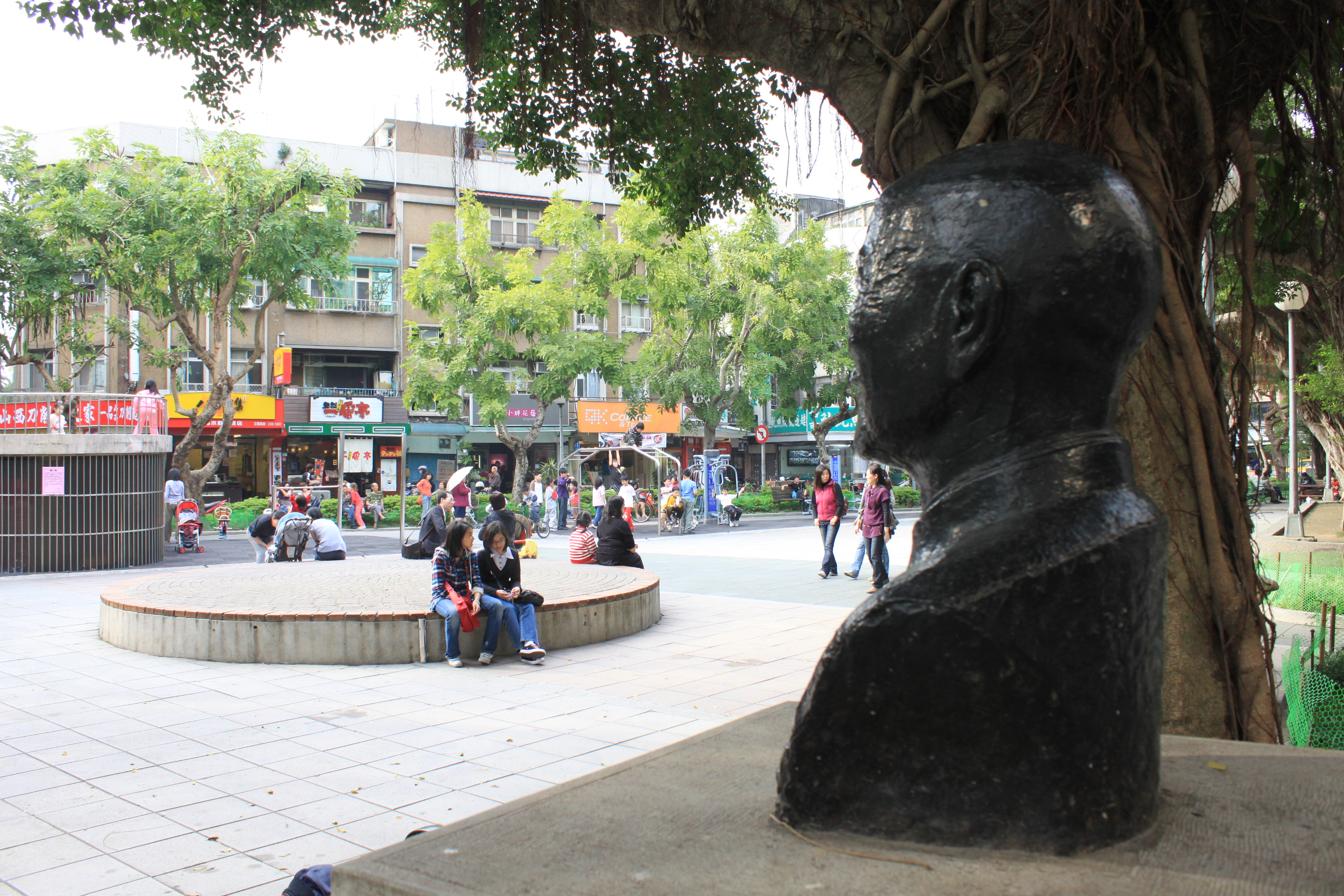
Bust in public square

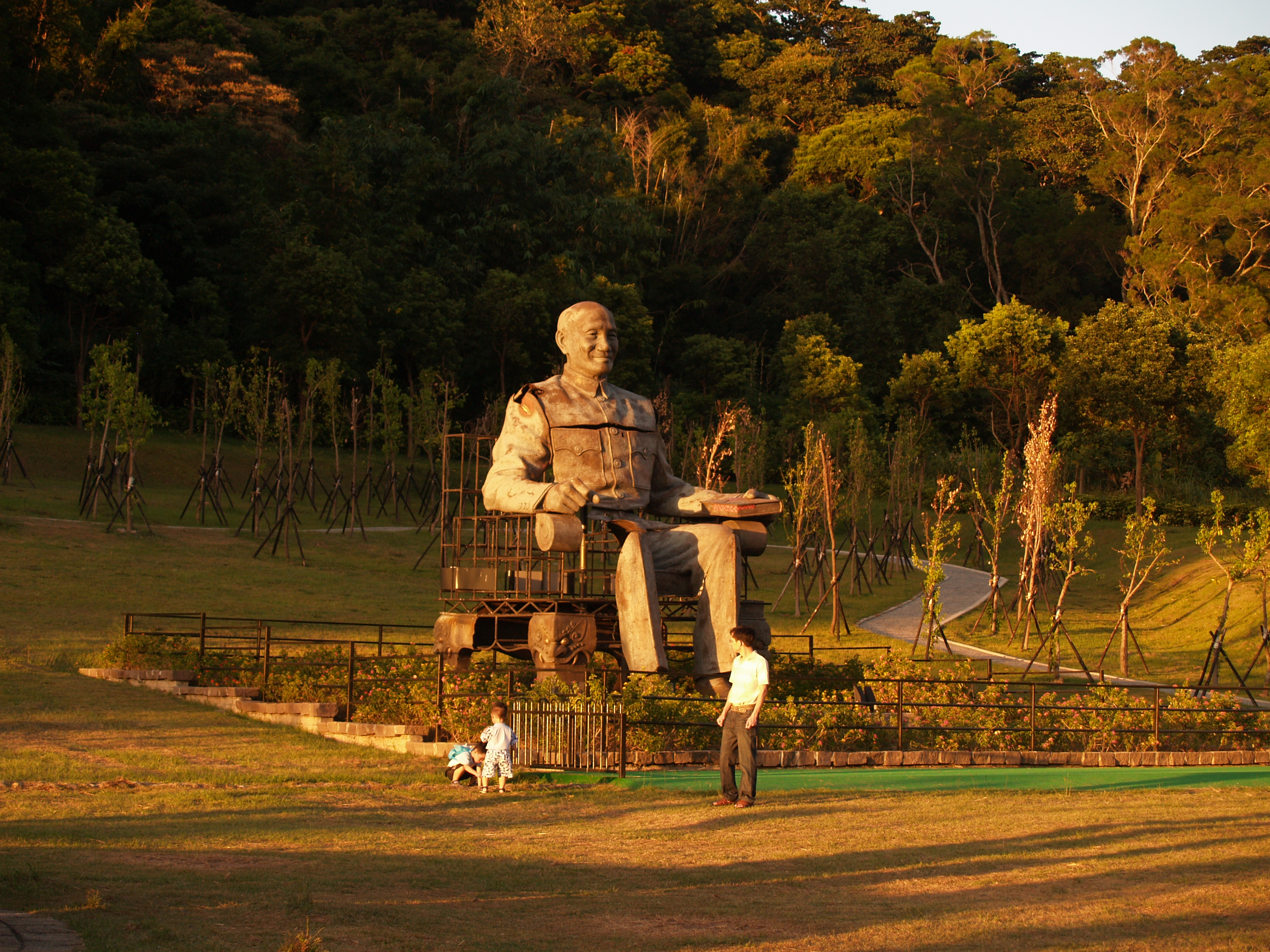
Wounds and Regeneration

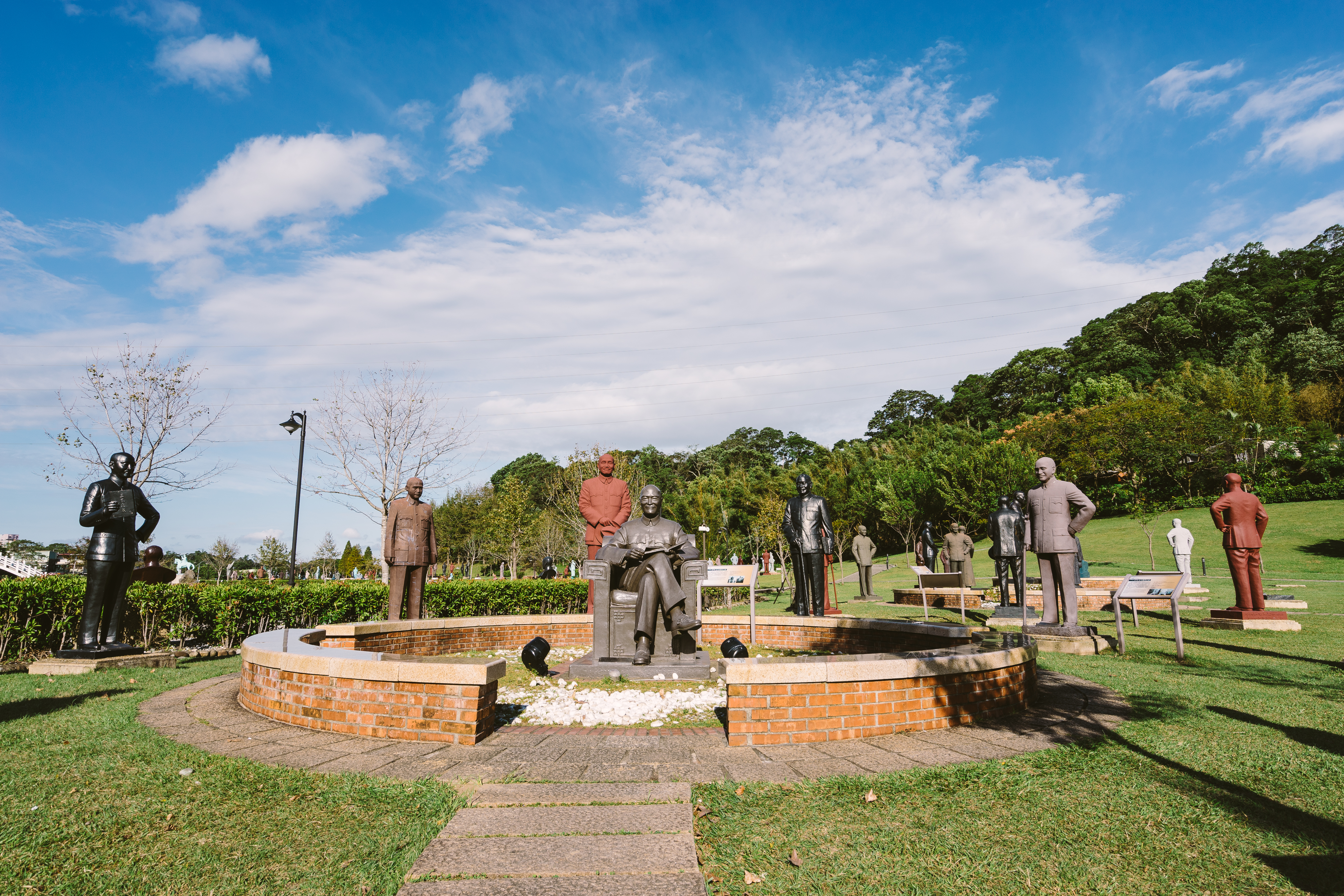

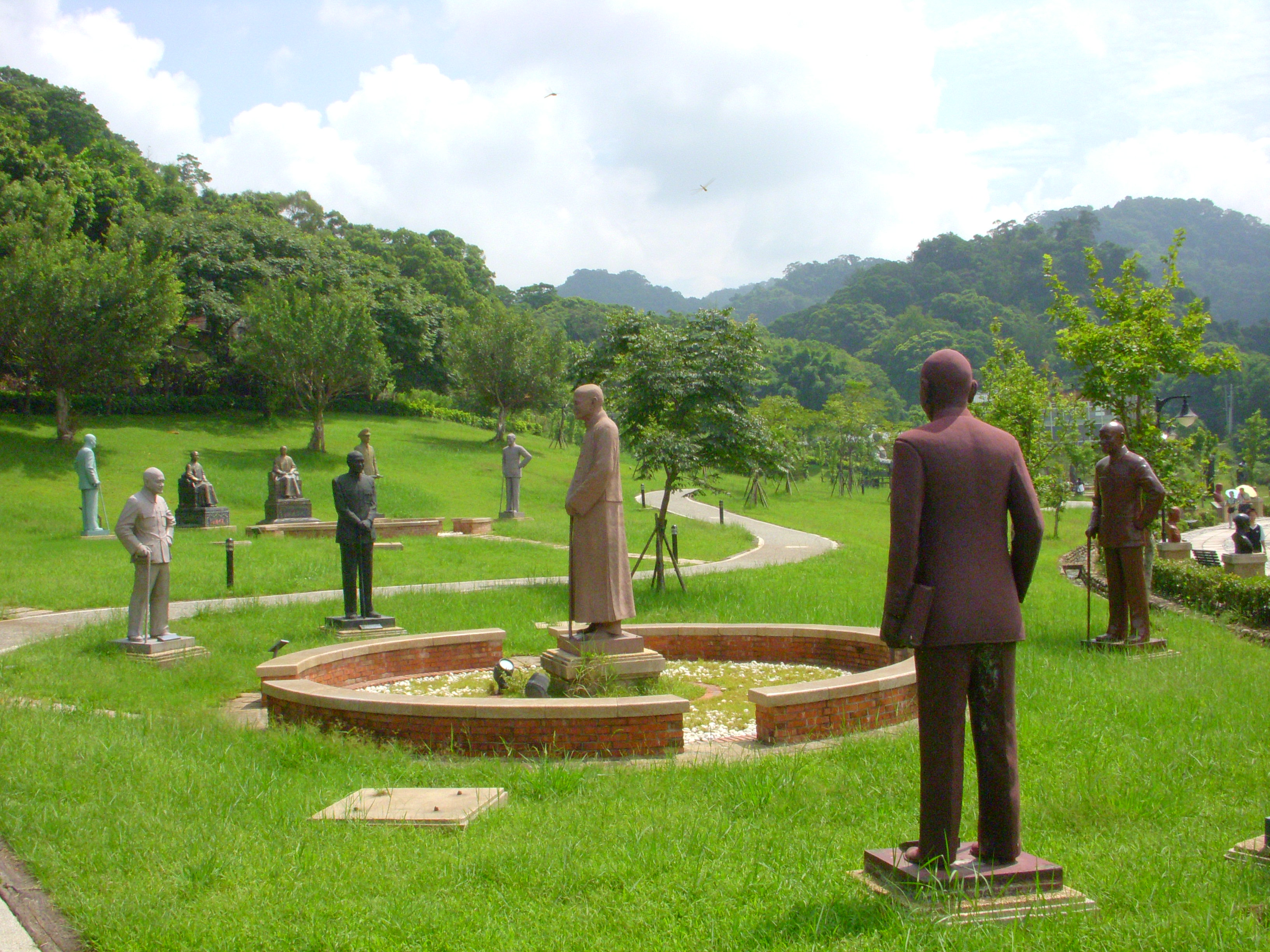

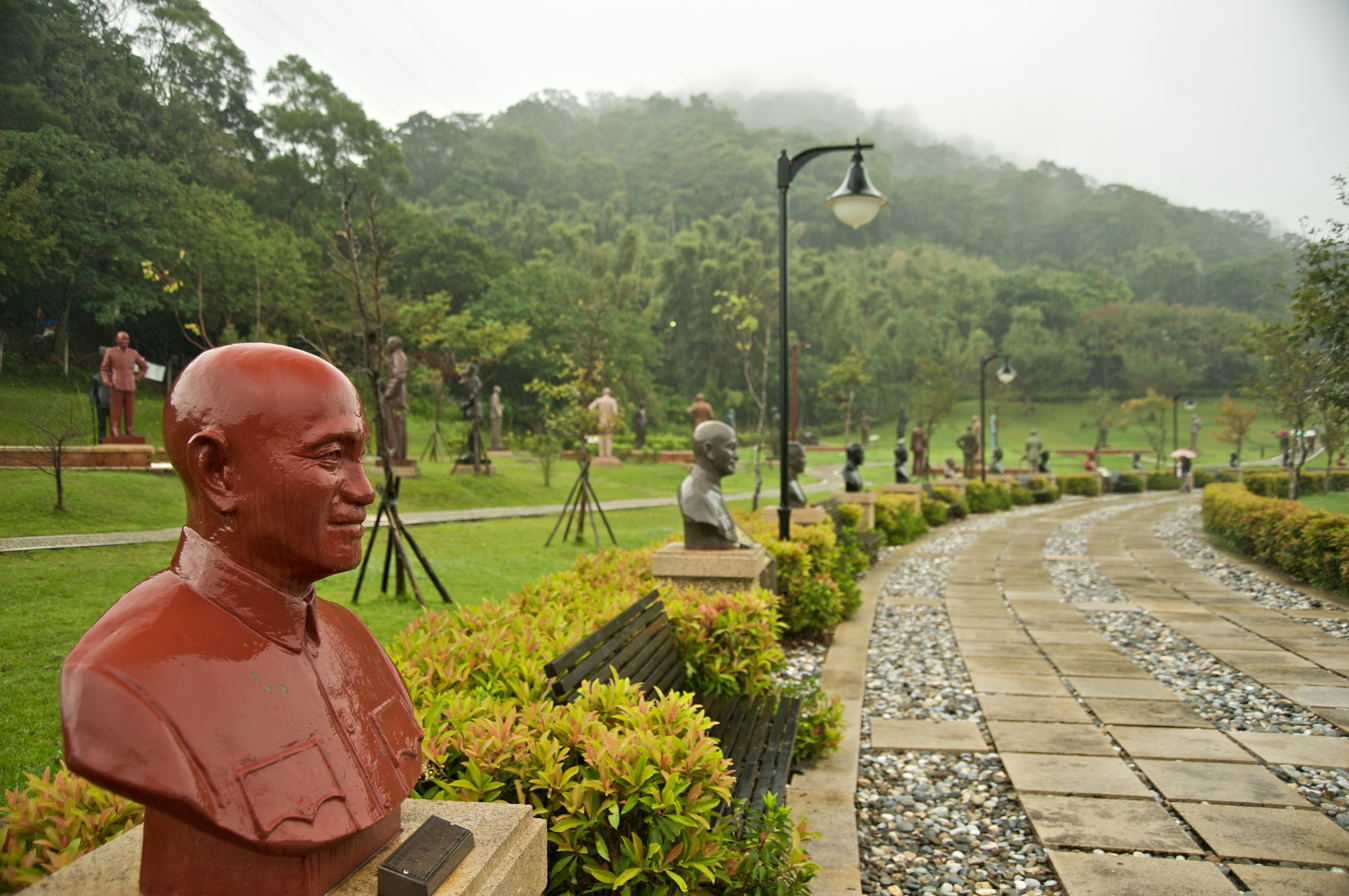

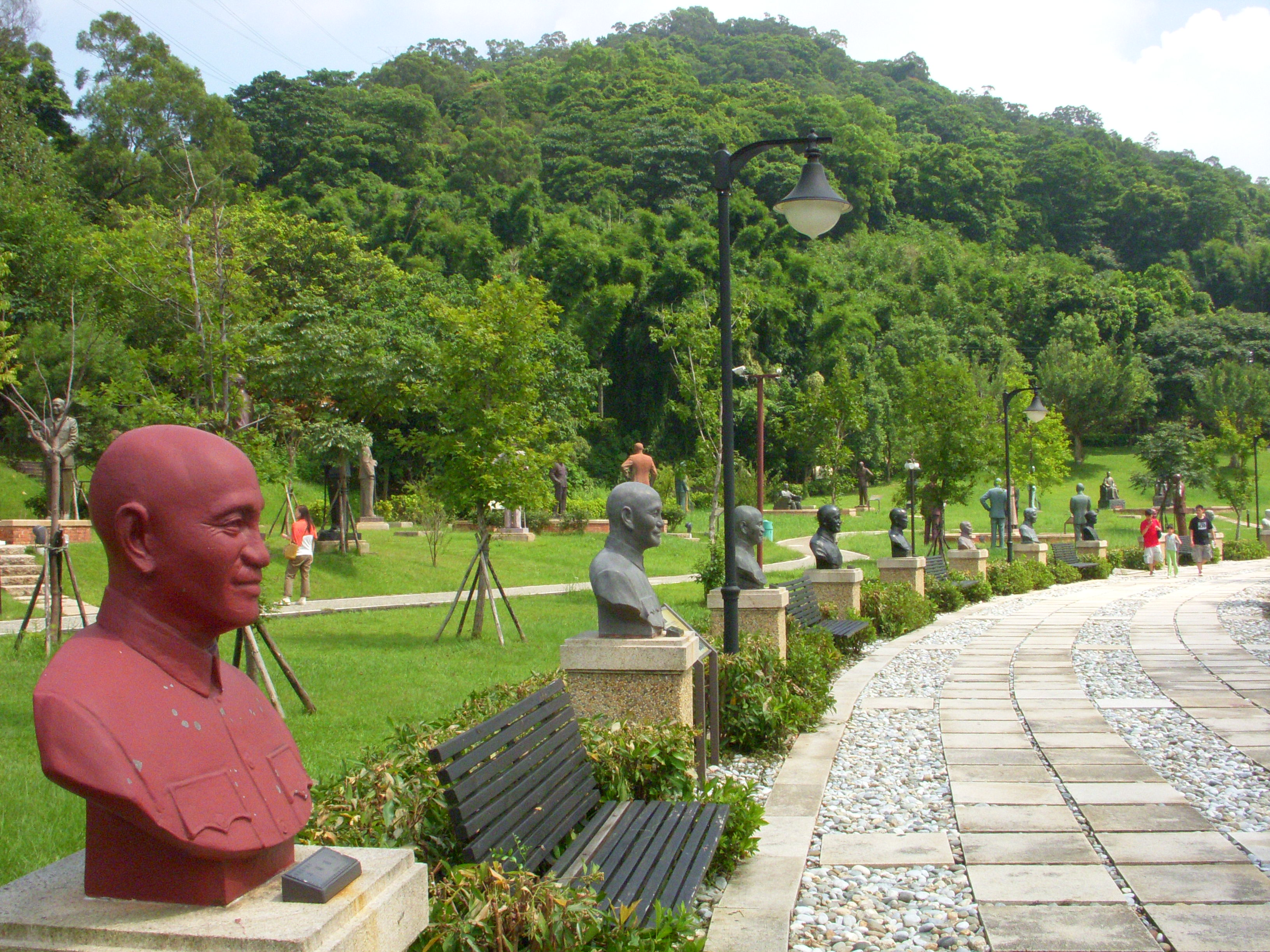

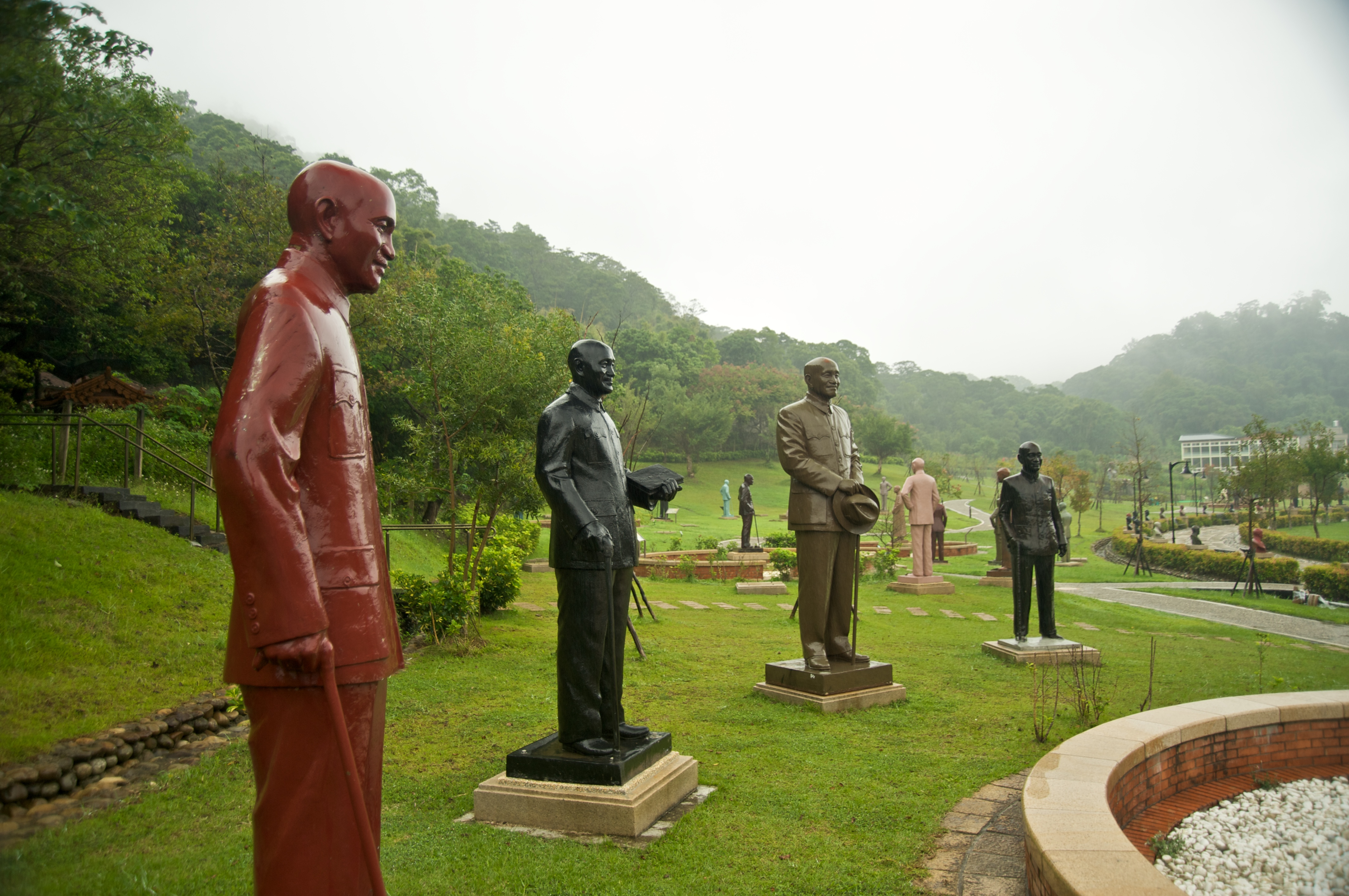

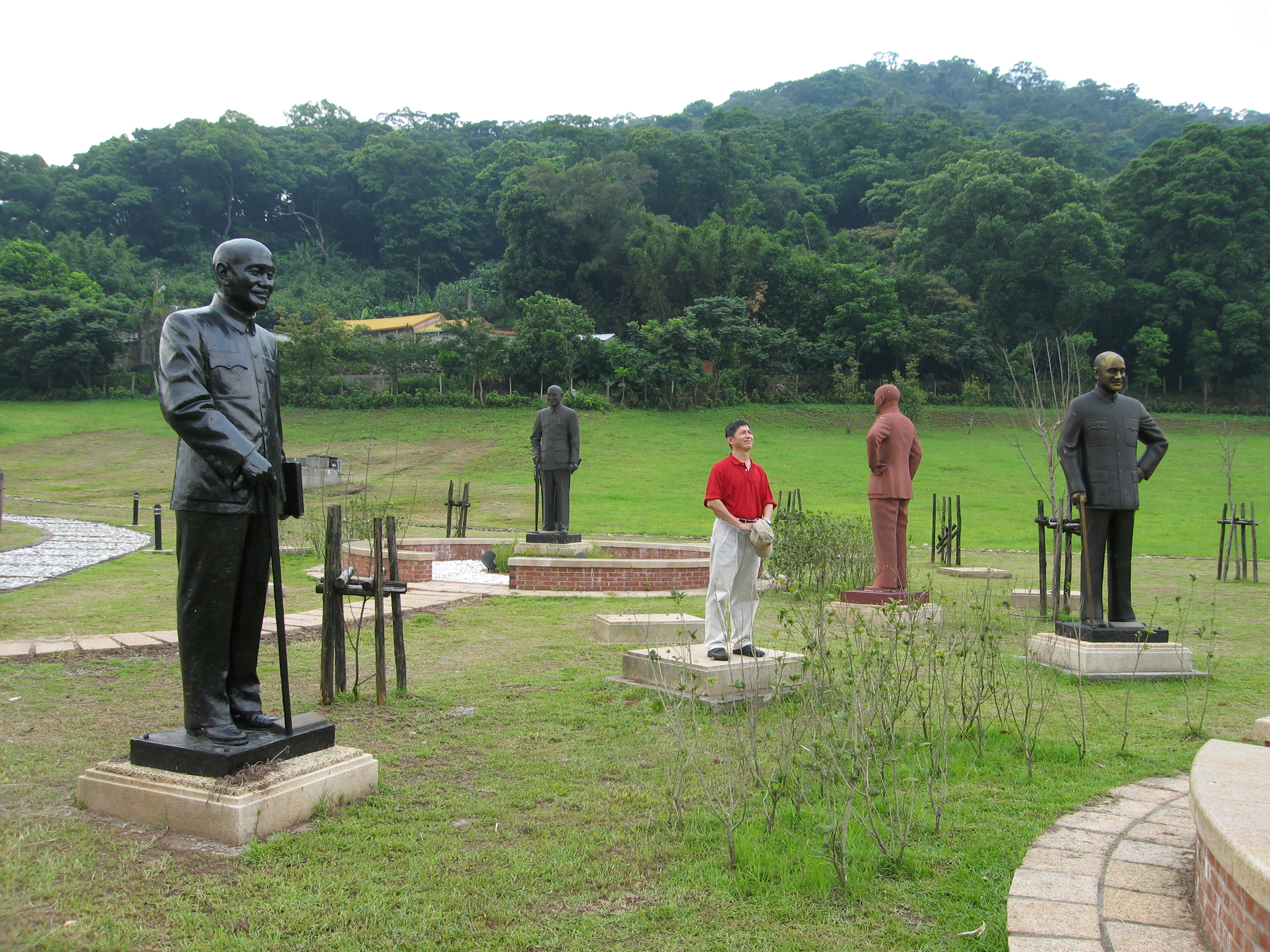
At Cihu, with human for scale.

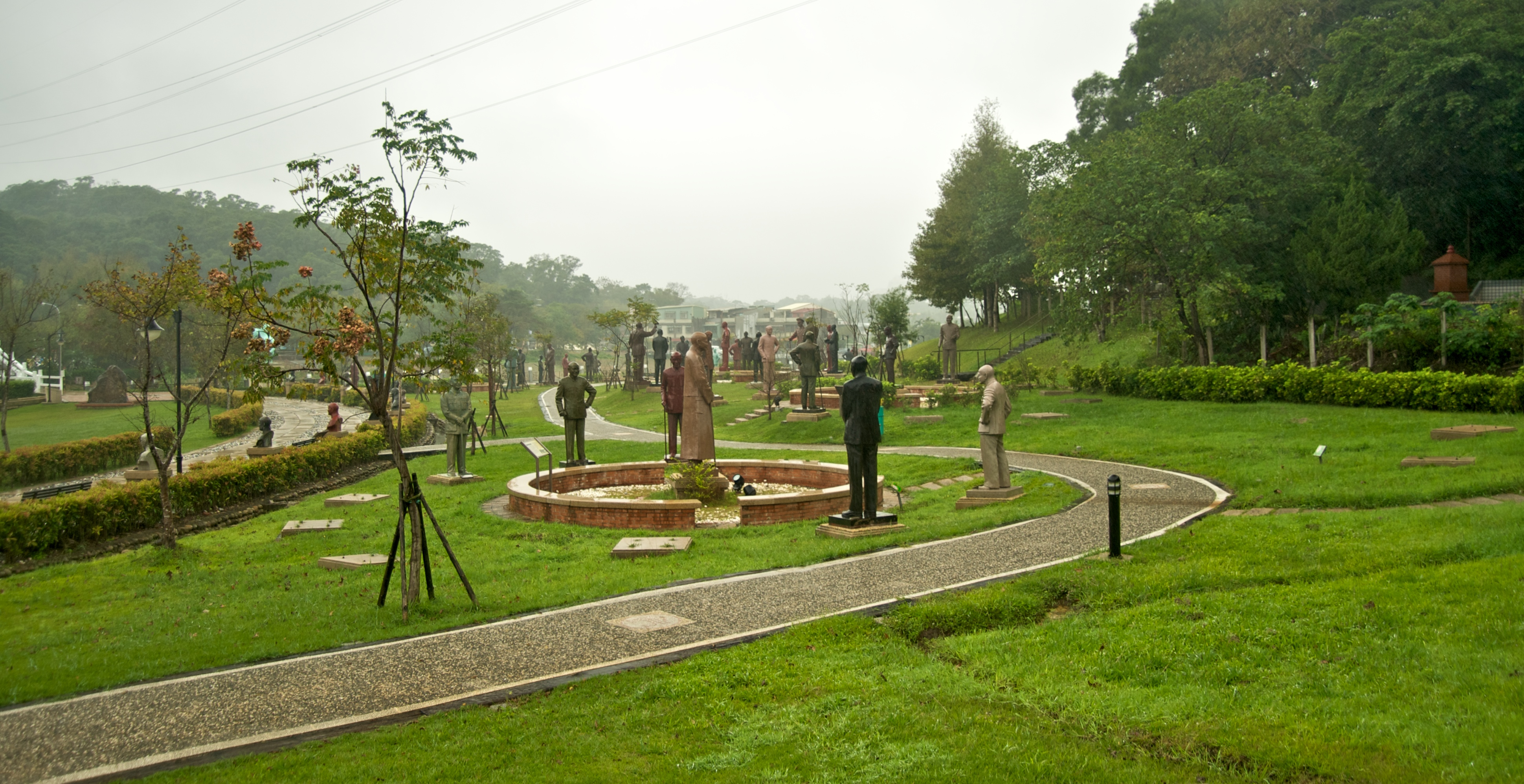

== See also ==
- National Chiang Kai-shek Memorial Hall
- Chiang Kai-shek
- Chiang Kai-shek Memorial Song
- Sun Yat-sen
- List of statues of Lenin
- List of statues of Stalin
- List of statues of Karl Marx
- Removal of Confederate monuments and memorials
- Fallen Monument Park
