= Hwang Yau-tai =

Chinese musician and composer

Hwang Yau-tai 黃友棣
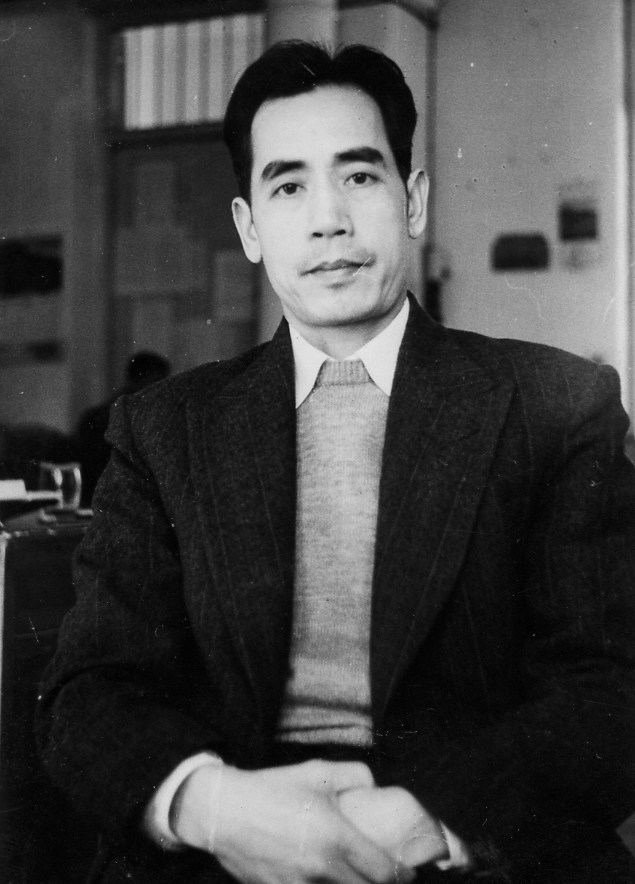

Background information
- Born: January 12, 1912; Gaoyao County, Guangdong Province, China
- Origin: China
- Died: July 4, 2010 (aged 98) Kaohsiung, Taiwan
- Occupations: Composer, writer and musician
- Website: mim.khcc.gov.tw/hyl

Hwang Yau-tai (simplified Chinese: 黄友棣; traditional Chinese: 黃友棣; pinyin: Huáng Yǒudì) or Huang Yau-tai (January 12, 1912 – July 4, 2010) was a Chinese musician, writer and composer. He wrote over 2000 compositions, the most popular being "Azaleas," which was written in 1941 during the Second Sino-Japanese War.

== Biography ==
Hwang Yau-tai was born in 1912 in the western part of Guangdong province. His love of music, art, poetry, and literature was fostered from an early age. At seven, he attended the Chi-Ying Elementary School founded by his father, Hwang Tsang-Zhang. He was educated in Canton and graduated in 1934 with a B.A. in Education from Sun Yat-sen University in Canton. At the same time, he obtained the Higher Local Certificate for Violin from Trinity College of Music, London. Professor Alice Lee and Professor Tonoff were his tutors in piano and violin, respectively. For his lessons in violin, he traveled frequently from Canton to Hong Kong by train. After the Sino-Japanese War broke out, he moved to the northern part of Guangdong. During the hostilities with Japan, it was difficult to obtain a piano in inland China, which was why he used a violin instead. He wrote many lyrical pieces and folk songs with variations, which were played with great success everywhere. He taught people how to appreciate the solo violin sonatas by Bach and violin caprices by Paganini, as well as lyrical pieces by Wieniawski and others. When he realised that audiences preferred Chinese music, he began to devote his energies to Chinese style music.

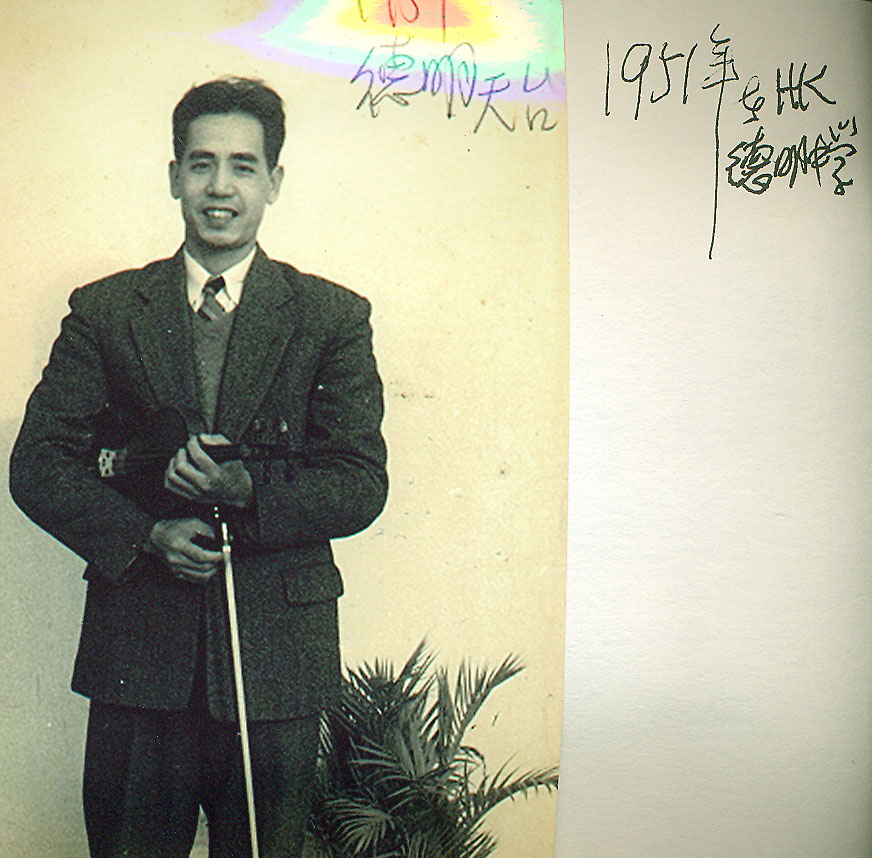
Chinese music composer Hwang Yau-tai was a concert violinist before studying composition in Rome, Italy. Photo taken in Hong Kong, 1951.

From 1939 to 1945, he taught music at the Teacher's College of Sun Yat-sen University and the Provincial Institute of Art. He composed music for the army band and songs for various choral groups, conducting the performances himself. After the Armistice, Professor Hwang moved to Hong Kong in 1949. He obtained the diploma for violin from the Royal Schools of Music (LRSM) in 1955 and taught music while improving his composition technique. The songs he composed at this time include "Azaleas in Bloom," "Far from Home," and "Canton My Hometown," which were among the most popular. He discovered that the ancient melodies and folk songs were not limited to the major-minor system, but were actually in different modes. He felt that to compose good music in the Chinese style, modal harmony had to be used together with classical and modern harmony. After 1950, he followed that principle whole-heartedly, composing "Ali-Shan Variations," "Oriental Nocturne," "Lantern Dance" for violin and piano, "Black Mist," and "Ask the Nightingales and Orioles" for solo voice and chorus.

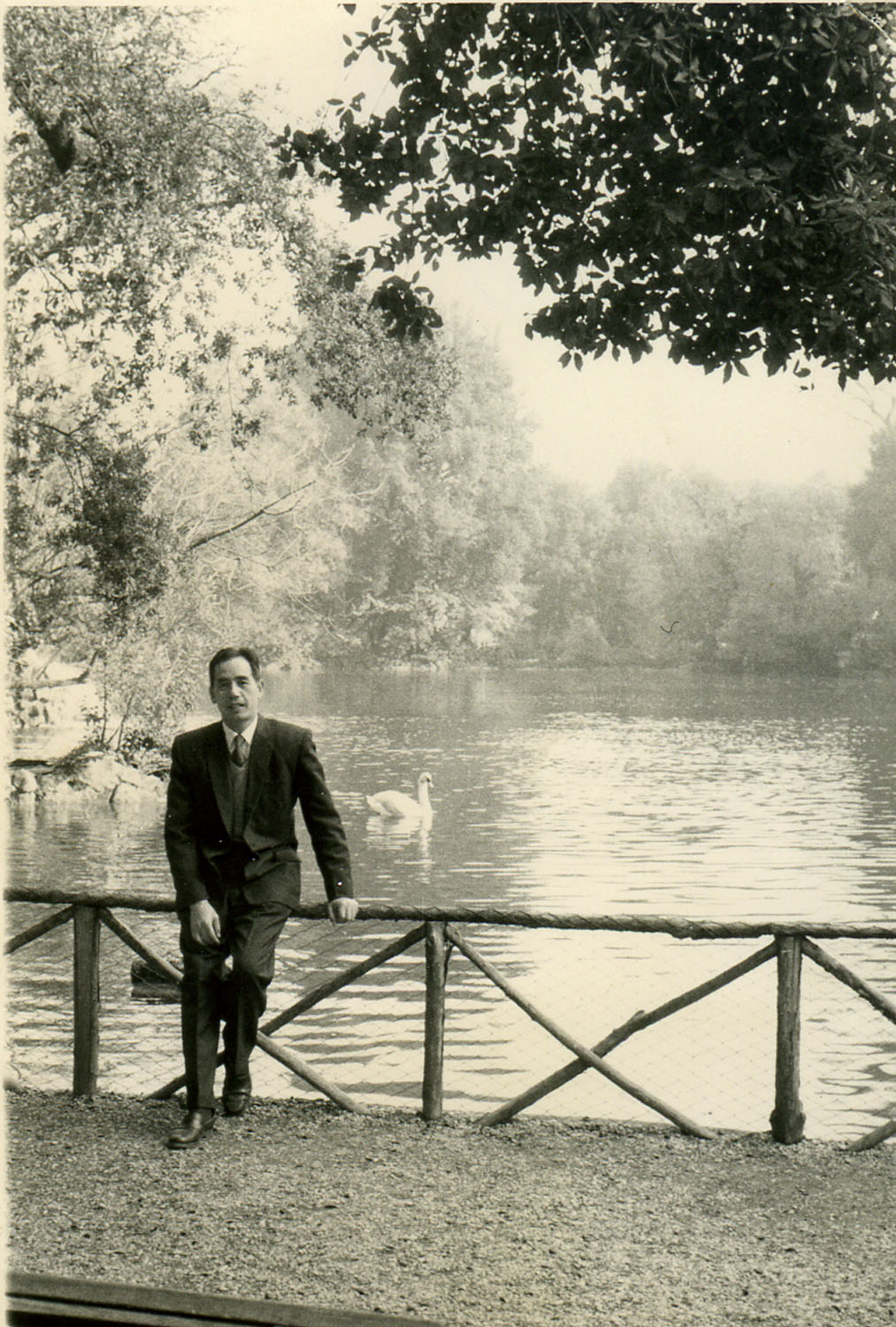
Hwang Yau-tai in the late '50s at Villa Borghese in Italy. Photographer unknown

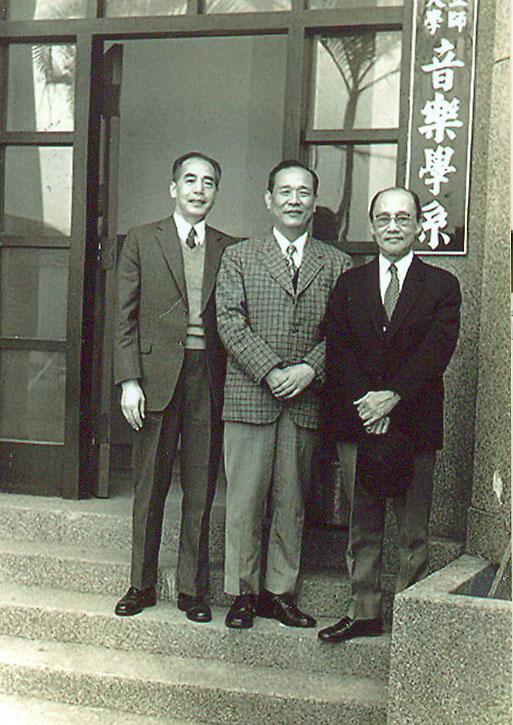
The "Three Friends of Winter": Composer Hwang Yau-tai (left) with composer Lin Sheng-shih and lyricist Harold H. T. Wei (Han-zhang Wei) in Hong Kong, mid 1960s

In 1957, with the help of friends from Tai Tung High School in Hong Kong, he furthered his studies in Europe. In London, Professor Harry Stubbs taught him practical composing techniques, and in Switzerland, Padre Kellin illustrated the use of modes in religious music. In Rome, two famous professors taught him musical composition. Maestro Franco Margola at the Pontifical Academy in Rome trained him further in classical harmony, modern harmony, and orchestration, while Maestro Edgardo Carducci taught him strict modal counterpoint and modern composition. After six years of hard work, he succeeded in obtaining a Master of Composition degree from the Mondiale Academy of Art. Hwang Yau-tai has earned his living by teaching, composing songs, copying manuscripts, and printing music. He has been invited to compose songs frequently for schools, institutes, and various associations. In Hong Kong, Taiwan, and cities in southeast Asia and the United States, his compositions are performed regularly, and his tutor, Maestro Margola, often conducts Hwang's orchestral works in Bologna and Parma, Italy.

Hwang loved Chinese culture and felt it was his duty to promote the cultural heritage. In 1962, he was awarded the Culture and Arts Award by the Ministry of Education and in 1967, the Chung Shan Culture and Arts Award for his Cantata, "Great China," which has 11 movements. In 1968, he went to Taiwan at the invitation of the Ministry of Education to give lectures explaining his theory of Chinese-style composition of music. President Chiang Kai-shek gave Hwang an audience on September 16, 1968. Hwang has donated all the cash prizes he has won to Taiwan Music Educational work, saying, "This unexpected income should be used for musical education."

Throughout most of Hwang's life, China was enveloped in constant warfare. The Qing Dynasty (1644–1911), already weakened by the Opium Wars (1842, 1860), the Taiping Rebellion (1850–1864), and the Boxer Rebellion (1900) that by the time Hwang was born in 1912, its collapse opened way for the birth of the Republic of China, led by Sun Yat-sen. Hwang was a young boy at the beginning of the Warlords Era (1916–28) that kept much of the country divided into fiefdoms. 1919's May 4 movement marked the beginning of the Chinese Communist Party (CCP) that engaged the fledgling Kuomintang (KMT) for over 20 years of struggle (1927–49). In between the fighting, the 2nd Sino-Japanese War (1937–1945) and the Chinese Civil War (1946–1949) took place during Hwang's adult life. It was in 1941 when Hwang wrote the popular song, "Azaleas in Bloom," describing a maiden who wears an azalea, waiting for her sweetheart to return home from war. Hwang left his young family to look for work in Hong Kong in 1949 when Mao Zedong's CCP proved victorious over the KMT, led by Chiang Kai-shek. It was in Hong Kong where Hwang lived for 32 years, leaving only for 6 years in 1957 to study music in Europe. His wife and their three daughters, Mimi, Jane and Nancy, emigrated to the United States in 1956. In Hong Kong, Hwang could still teach and write music and was able to avoid the Cultural Revolution (1966–1976) when many intellectuals and scholars were persecuted. Plagued by eye problems brought on by weather conditions and anxious about Hong Kong's future in 1987, Hwang settled in Kaohsiung, Taiwan where he lived for the next 23 years. The composer, who wrote of the longing for his homeland ("Canton, my Hometown," "Far from Home," "Song of the Cotton Tree") found refuge inside himself and in his music. He was still writing, attending concerts and composing music in his own unique Chinese-style of harmony including musical pieces on Buddhist sutras and texts Huihai gei (The Sea of Wisdom), Xiaowu (Morning Mist) and Moni Zhu (The Pearl) and on the philosopher Confucius before being hospitalized due to a fall in 2009.

Hwang died of multiple organ failure on July 4, 2010, at Kaohsiung Veterans General Hospital after breaking both hips in a fall in 2009. At the July 13 funeral service held at Yuen Chao Temple in Kaohsiung County, ROC President Ma Ying-jeou sang "Azaleas in Bloom" along with other attendees.

== Family ==
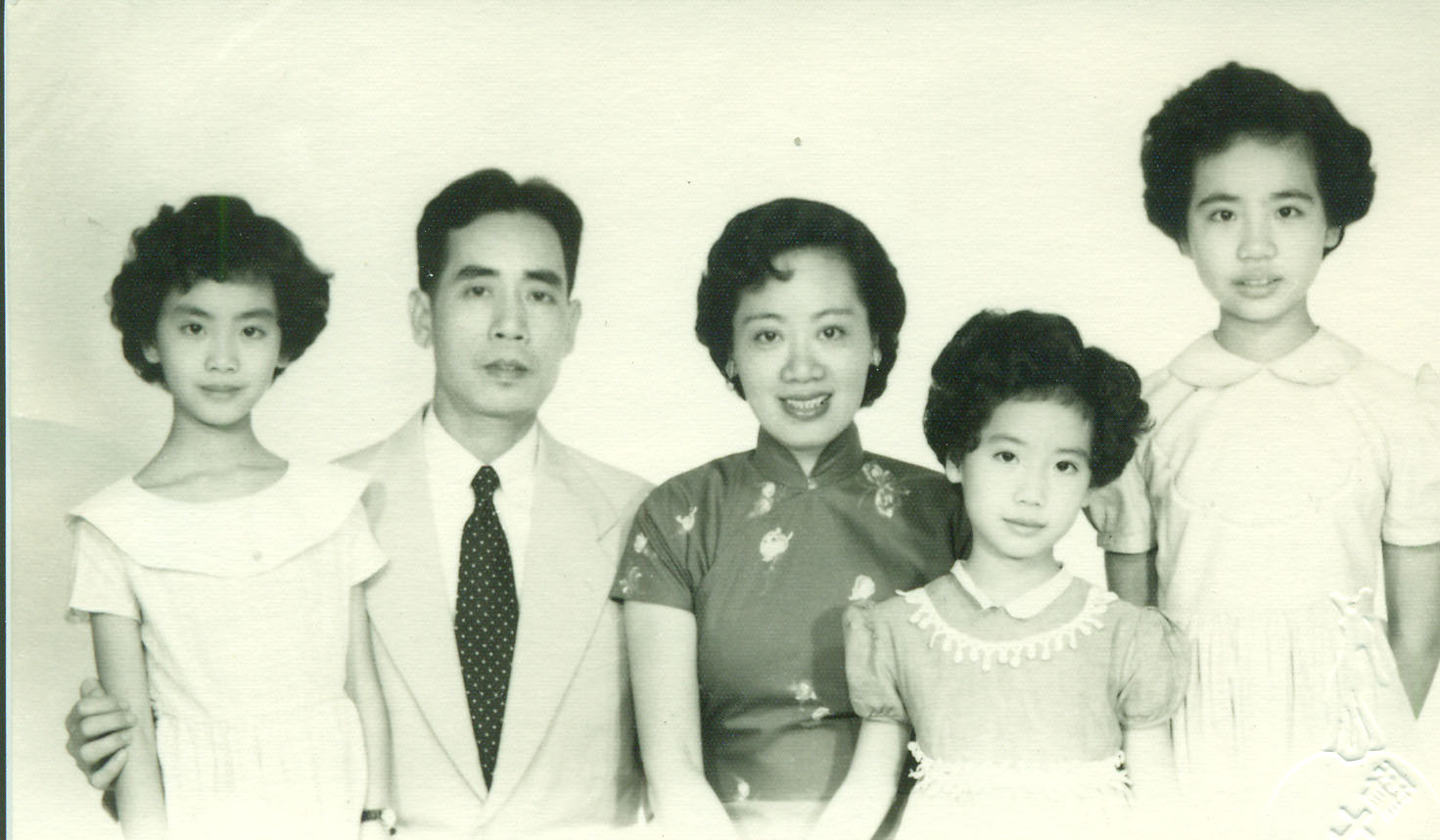
Hwang Yau-tai and family in Hong Kong, 1955.

Hwang had three daughters, Mimi, Jane, and Nancy, to whom he dedicated his 1988 songbook, Lyrical Pieces for Piano Solo (with Vocal Score).

In 1960, Hwang composed two songs for his 11-year-old daughter Nancy, who showed him some of her poems. "Death of a Deer" and "Luckless Day" for mezzo-soprano solo and pianoforte accompaniment were published later in 1967 by Lucky Music Copy Service in Kowloon, Hong Kong.

Hwang married Liu Feng-hsien in 1943, but after living apart for over 20 years, the couple formally divorced in 1965.

== Awards ==
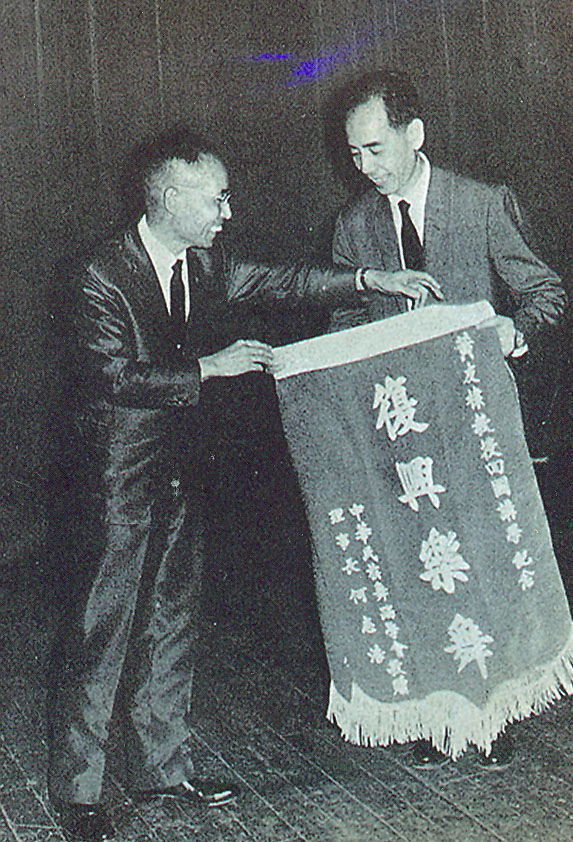
Hwang Yau-tai receives a banner ("Revitalizing Music & Dance") commemorating his visit to Taiwan to give music lectures for teachers and students late '60s.

- 1952 Composition Award of Patriotic Song, Chinese Writers' & Artists' Association
- 1962 The Culture & Arts Award, Ministry of Education
- 1963 The Overseas Chinese Innovation Award, Overseas Chinese Affairs Commission
- 1965 Dr. Sun Yat-Sen's 100-Year Memorial Award
- 1967 Chong Shan Culture & Arts Award
- 1967 Social Education & Service Award, Ministry of Education
- 1967 Hai Guang Medal, Overseas Chinese Affairs Commission
- 1968 Culture & Arts Medal of the Year of Music, Ministry of Education
- 1982 The 24th Honor Award, Chinese Writers' & Artists Association
- 1983 Special Contribution Honor, National Culture & Arts Award
- 1984 Pu Guang Gold Award, Ministry of National Defense
- 1984 Gold and Silver Honor, Military Culture & Arts Award
- 1986 The Senior Faculty Award of Overseas Chinese School
- 1987 Musician Memorial Award, Association of Chinese Folk Music in Hong Kong
- 1994 The Culture Medal, Executive Yuan
- 1996 Remarkable Musician Award, Kaohsiung City Government
- 1997 The 16th Special Contribution Honor, Culture & Arts Award, Kaohsiung
- 1998 The 1st Remarkable Alumni Award, National Sun Yat-Sen University
- 1999 Special Song Award of the Cultural Volunteer Composer, Cultural Department
- 1999 The 18th "Special Contribution Honor" of Culture & Art Award, Kaohsiung City Government
- 2000 The Senior Cultural Intellectual Award, Council for Cultural Affairs, the Executive Yuan
- 2000 The 19th Lifetime Achievement Award, Kaohsiung City Government
- 2001 National Files Award, the Bureau of National Confidential

== Selected works ==
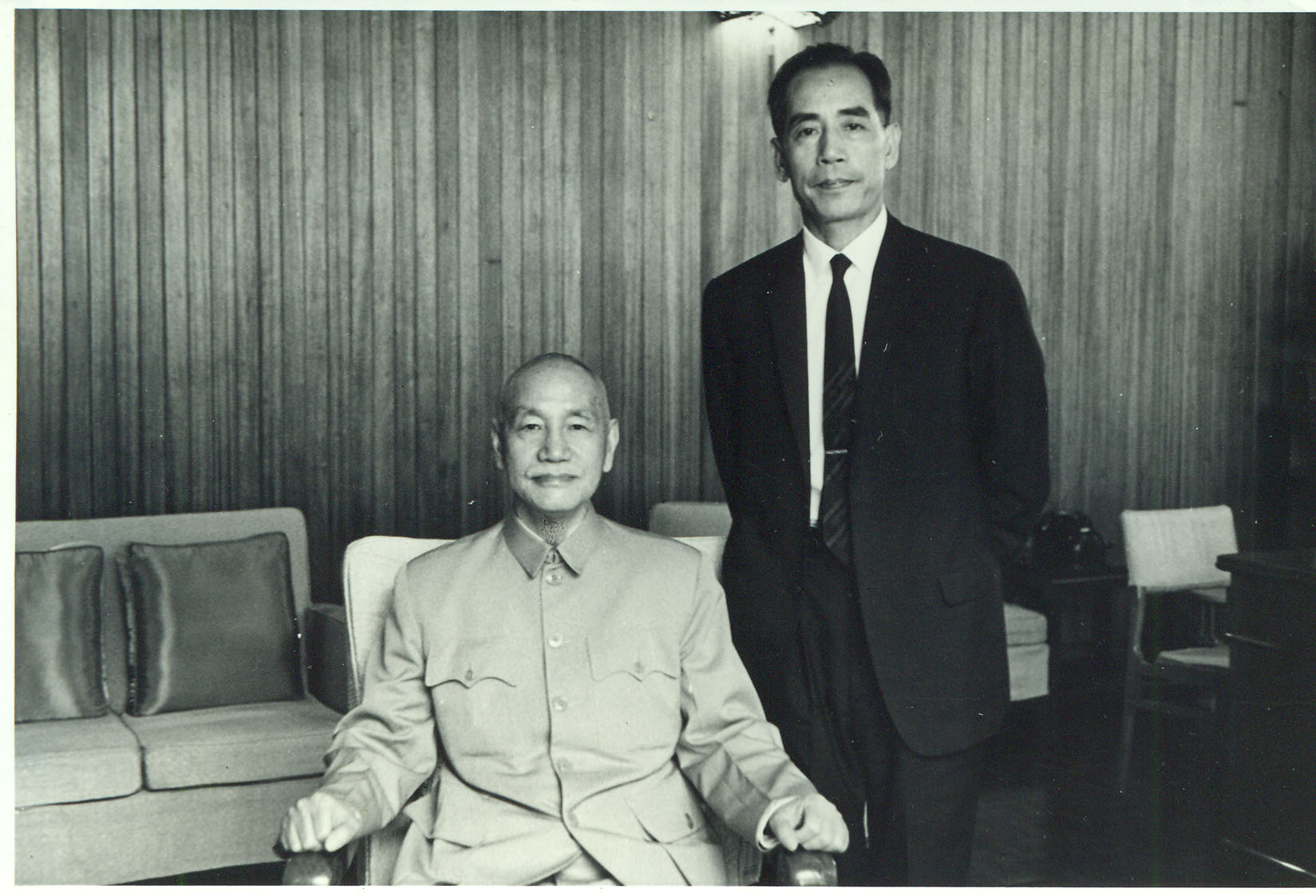
Chiang Kai-shek and Chinese music composer Hwang Yau-tai in Taipei, Taiwan September 1968. Hwang would later compose the memorial song for Chiang Kai-shek's funeral in 1975.

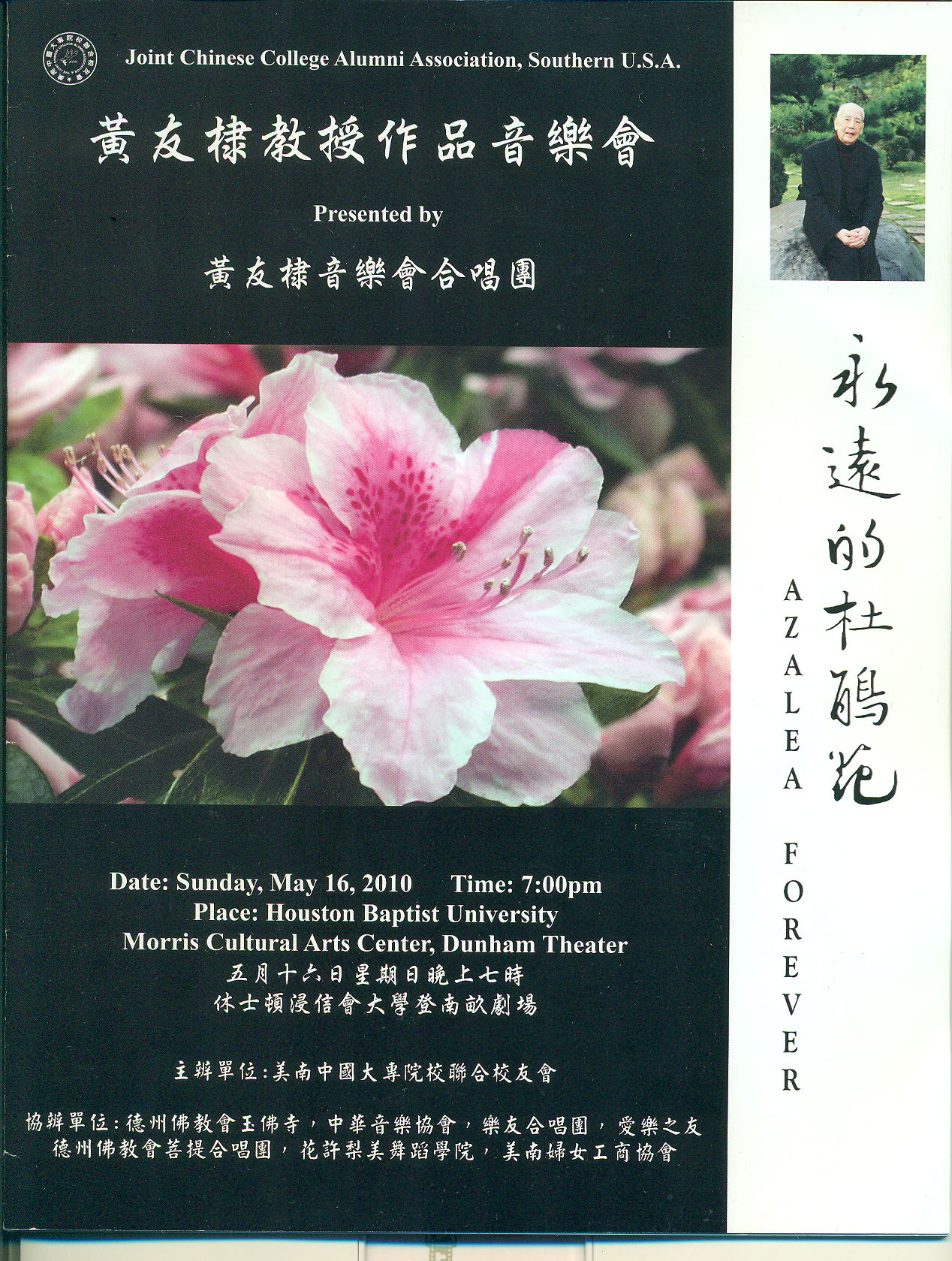
March 2010 program for Hwang Yau-tai memorial concert in Houston, Texas.

- Chiang Kai-shek Memorial Song 先總統蔣公紀念歌
- New Asia College school song 新亞書院校歌
- New Asia Middle School school song 新亞中學校歌
- Fu Jen Catholic University Anthem (after the resumption of school) 天主教輔仁大學校歌（復校後） （view Video）
- Chinese Culture University Anthem 中國文化大學校歌
- National Taiwan Ocean University Anthem 國立臺灣海洋大學校歌
- National Kaohsiung University of Applied Sciences Anthem 國立高雄應用科技大學校歌
- Hong Kong, Zhuhai College school song 香港珠海學院校歌
- Hong Kong, Zhuhai College 60 Anniversary ode 香港珠海學院六十周年校慶頌歌
- National Hsinchu Senior High School Second alma mater 國立新竹高級中學第二校歌
- Lok Sin Tong Benevolent Society, Kowloon under the secondary schools, primary schools, and kindergartens joint school song 九龍樂善堂屬下中學、小學及幼稚園聯合校歌
- Shun Tak Fraternal Association is a school alma mater 順德聯誼總會屬校校歌
- Liu Po Shan Memorial College school song 廖寶珊紀念書院校歌
- Chiu Lut Sau Memorial Secondary school song 趙聿修紀念中學校歌
- Azaleas in Bloom 杜鵑花
- https://www.youtube.com/watch?v=X8zTV3_VsQs
