= Jay Taylor (author) =

American diplomat (1931–2022)

- Born: John Taylor; December 4, 1931; Little Rock, Arkansas, U.S.
- Died: March 3, 2022 (aged 90); Decatur, Georgia, U.S.
- Education: Vanderbilt University (BA); University of Michigan (MA)
- Notable work: The Generalissimo: Chiang Kai-shek and the Struggle for Modern China

Jay Taylor (December 4, 1931 – March 3, 2022) was an American biographer. He was best known for his biography of Chinese leader Chiang Kai-shek, The Generalissimo (2009). The book was awarded the Lionel Gelber Prize for the best English non-fiction book on foreign policy in 2010.

== Professional career ==
Taylor graduated from Vanderbilt University in 1952 with a Bachelor of Arts in business administration and political science, then earned a Master of Arts in Far Eastern studies from the University of Michigan. After serving as an Aviation Cadet in the U.S. Navy, Taylor served in the Foreign Service for 37 years. His career included appointments as leading the White House National Security Counsel for East Asia, Director of Analysis for Asian & Pacific Affairs, Officer-in-Charge of Chinese Political Affairs.

During his time as Ambassador to Cuba, Taylor and his family experienced sound and pressure sensations that left them with concussion-like symptoms, foreshadowing later symptoms from American diplomats.

Besides his work in the U.S. Foreign Service, he worked as a teacher at the Foreign Service Institute in Washington, D.C. and Taichung, Taiwan, as Diplomat-in-Residence at the Carter Presidential Center, and as a research associate at Harvard's Fairbanks Center for Chinese Studies.

== Writings ==
Taylor wrote op-eds in the LA Times, The Washington Post, and The New York Times. The most common topic in his columns was criticism of U.S. overreach in the Middle East.

Taylor's biography of Chiang Kai-Shek was among the first books to include information from Chiang's diaries, and it portrayed Chiang, known as the "Generalissimo," in more positive terms than were previously fashionable. In contrast to western negative perceptions, Taylor tried to rehabilitate his image as a man overwhelmed by the difficult conditions of China with warlords, communists, and Japanese threats. Taylor tried to moderate the incompetent, corrupt, and brutal dictator perception of Chiang as "the man who lost China" in previous biographies with more positive descriptions of Chiang's personality, policies, and goals. Though he lost control of the mainland and violated human rights, Chiang was able to counter the Japanese invasion and laid the foundation for democracy in Taiwan. For this book, Taylor was awarded the Lionel Gelber Prize for the best English non-fiction book on Foreign Policy in 2010.

His books include:

- The Generalissimo: Chiang Kai-Shek and the Struggle for Modern China. Cambridge, MA: Belknap Press of Harvard University Press. 2009.
- The Generalissimo’s Son: Chiang Ching-Kuo and the Revolutions in China and Taiwan. Cambridge, MA: Harvard University Press. 2000.
- The Rise and Fall of Totalitarianism in the Twentieth Century. New York, NY: Paragon House. 1993.
- The Dragon and the Wild Goose: China and India. 1st Edition with Greenwood Press in 1987, 2nd Edition (with new epilogue) with Praeger Publishers in 1991.
- China and Southeast Asia: Peking’s Relations with Revolutionary Movements. Santa Barbara, CA: Praeger. 1st Edition 1975, Revised Edition 1979.
