= Propaganda in the Republic of China =

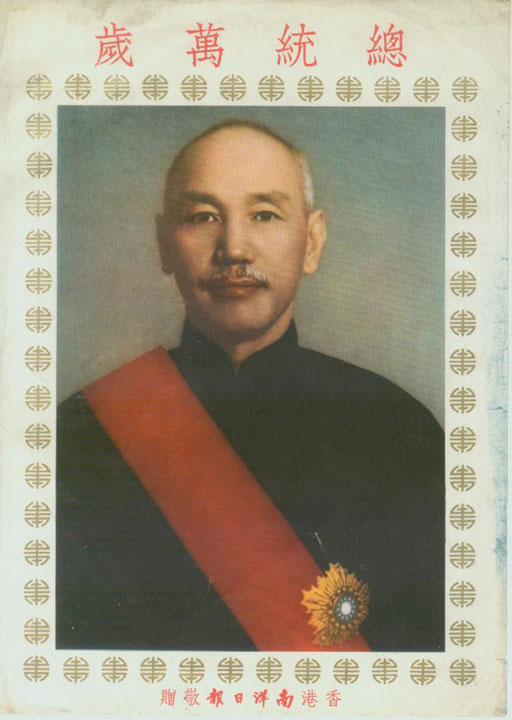
A propaganda poster celebrating the birthday of Republic of China President Chiang Kai-shek proclaiming "Long Live the President"

Propaganda in the Republic of China (in mainland China before 1949 and in Taiwan since then) has been an important tool since its inception with the 1911 Revolution for legitimizing the Nationalist government that retreated from mainland China to Taiwan in 1949. Anti-communism and resistance against Japanese imperialism have historically been central to propaganda in the Republic of China.

== Themes ==
=== Anti-warlordism ===
Lai Manwai's film documenting the Northern Expedition and Chiang Kai-shek's consolidation of power, produced by Lai's production company Minxin, was approved by the Kuomintang (KMT) branch in Shanghai as the only long-format film for party propaganda. This made it one of the first party films in China.

During the Nanjing government, the ROC launched a cultural campaign promoting the "Arts of the Three Principles of the People." It sought (mostly unsuccessfully) to attract cultural workers to create new propaganda works and more successfully established a censorship apparatus directed against unwelcome cultural products, especially left-wing artists and their works.

=== Nationalism ===
Because the national government of the time was weak, it was difficult for any censorship or propagandistic measures to be carried out effectively. However, a bureau was set up to control the production and the release of film in China. Also, newspapers unfavorable to the central government could be harassed at will. After the Northern Expedition, the power of the central government increased significantly, and propaganda campaigns became more effective. Propaganda was produced with different patriotic themes, such as Chinese nationalism.

Zheng Junli's 1941 film Long Live the Nations (Minzu wansui) was the first Chinese propaganda film aimed at developing solidarity among the ethnic minorities living in China's border regions. The film was produced through the Nationalist-controlled China Motion Picture Studio.

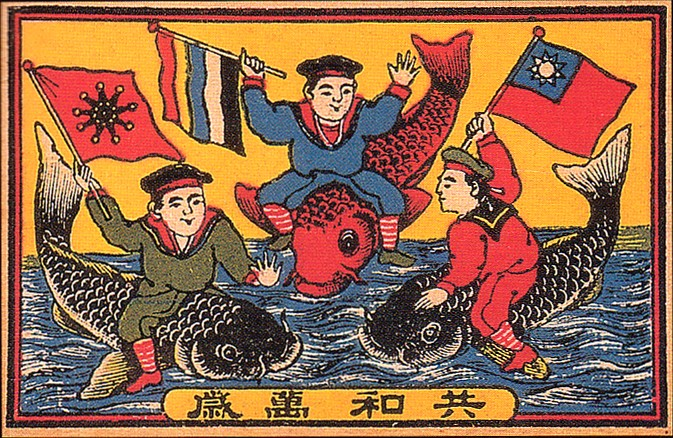
A Five Races Under One Union poster proclaiming "Long Live the Republic"

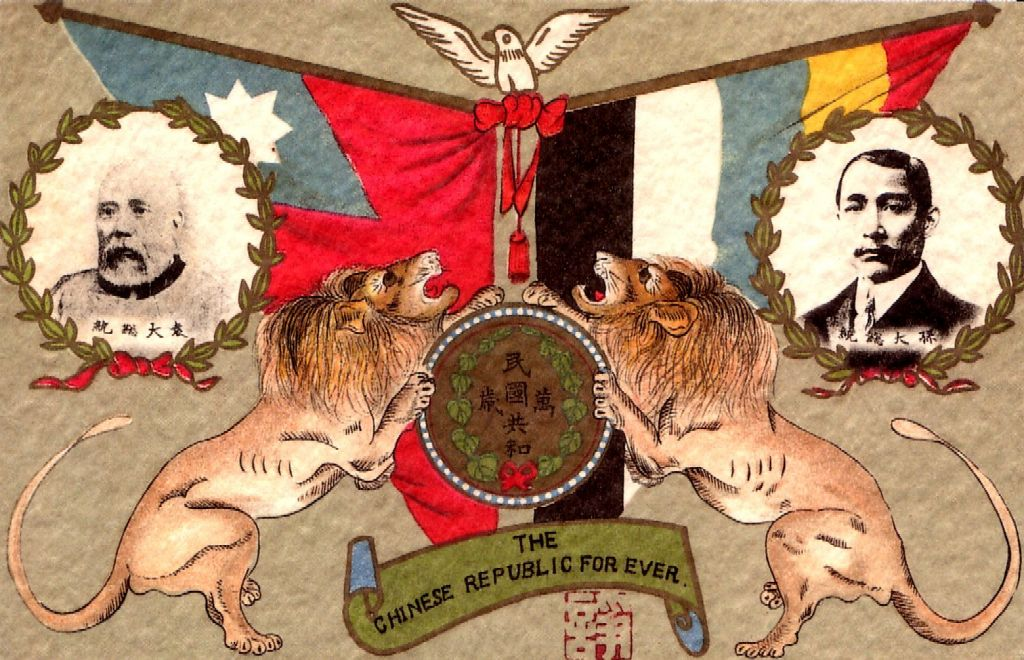
A poster proclaiming "The Chinese Republic Forever"

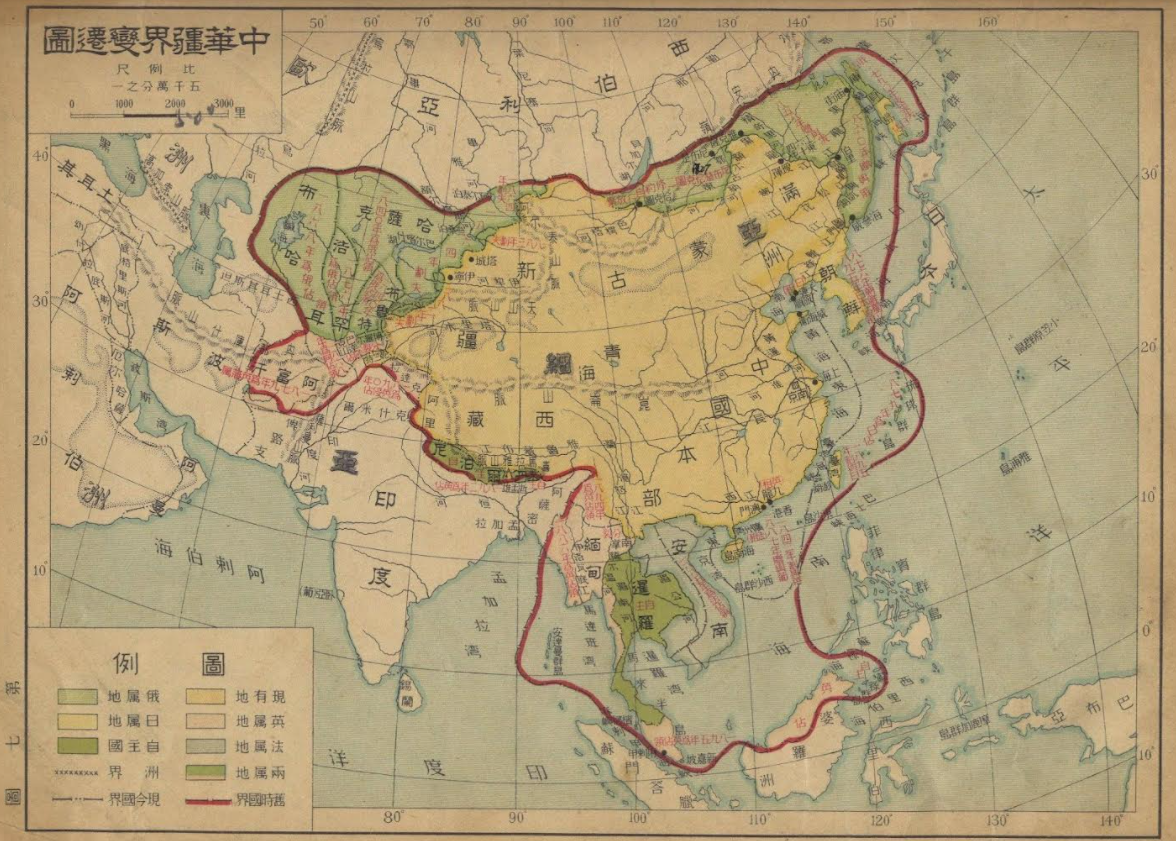
A 1933 irredentist map, the Map of National Shame

=== Anti-Japanese propaganda ===
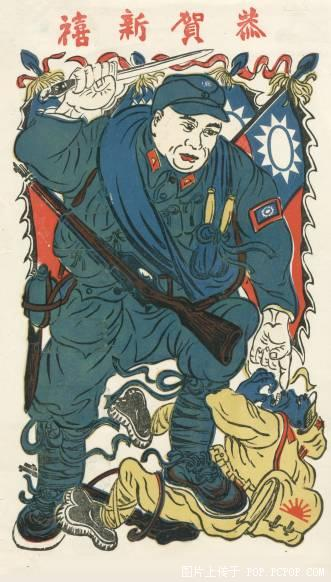
Anti-Japanese propaganda from the Second Sino-Japanese War by the National Revolutionary Army

The Republic of China produced propaganda against Japan during the Second Sino-Japanese War to booster morale and bolden resistance to the invasion.

By the 1930s and 1940s, both the Chinese Nationalist government and the Communist Party used documentary films as a form of propaganda. During the Second Sino-Japanese War, the Nationalists had mobile projectionists travel in rural China to play anti-Japanese propaganda films. More was produced during the Chinese Civil War.

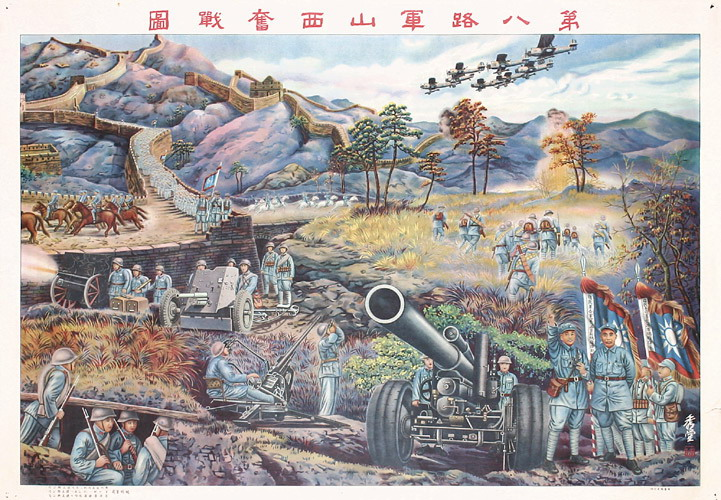
A poster by the Chinese Communist Party depicting the Eighth Route Army in Shanxi.

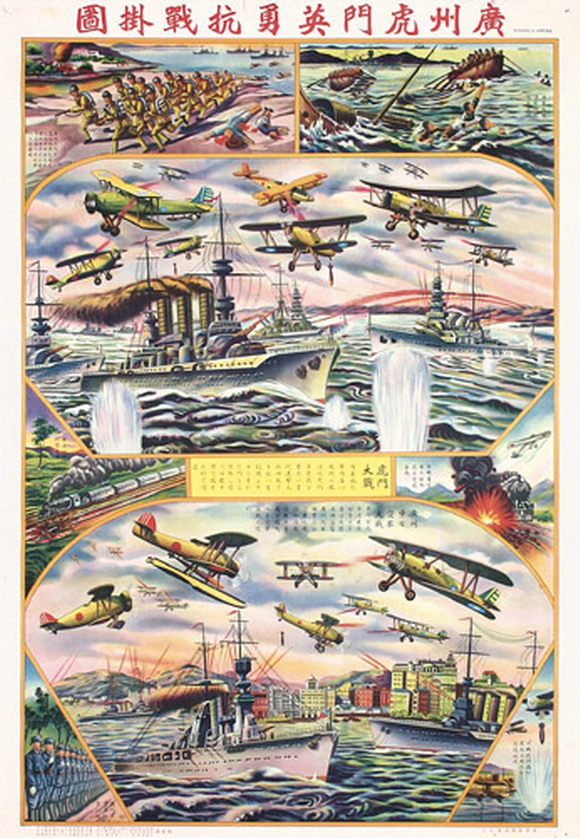
A poster of the battle in Humen, Guangzhou.

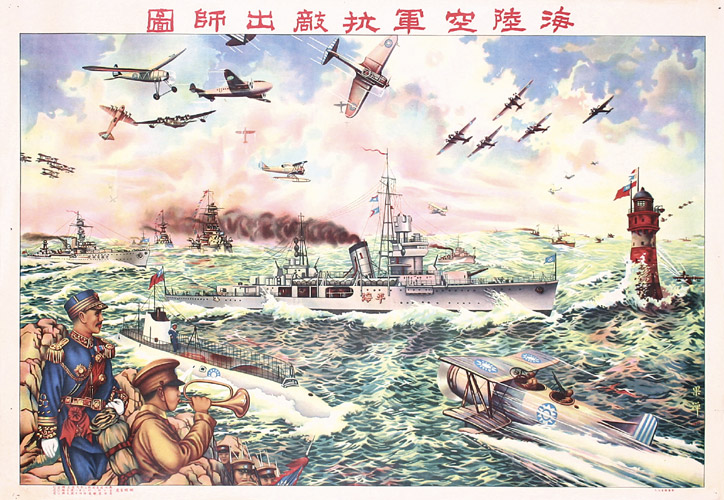
A poster depicting the National Revolutionary Army resisting against the Imperial Japanese Army.

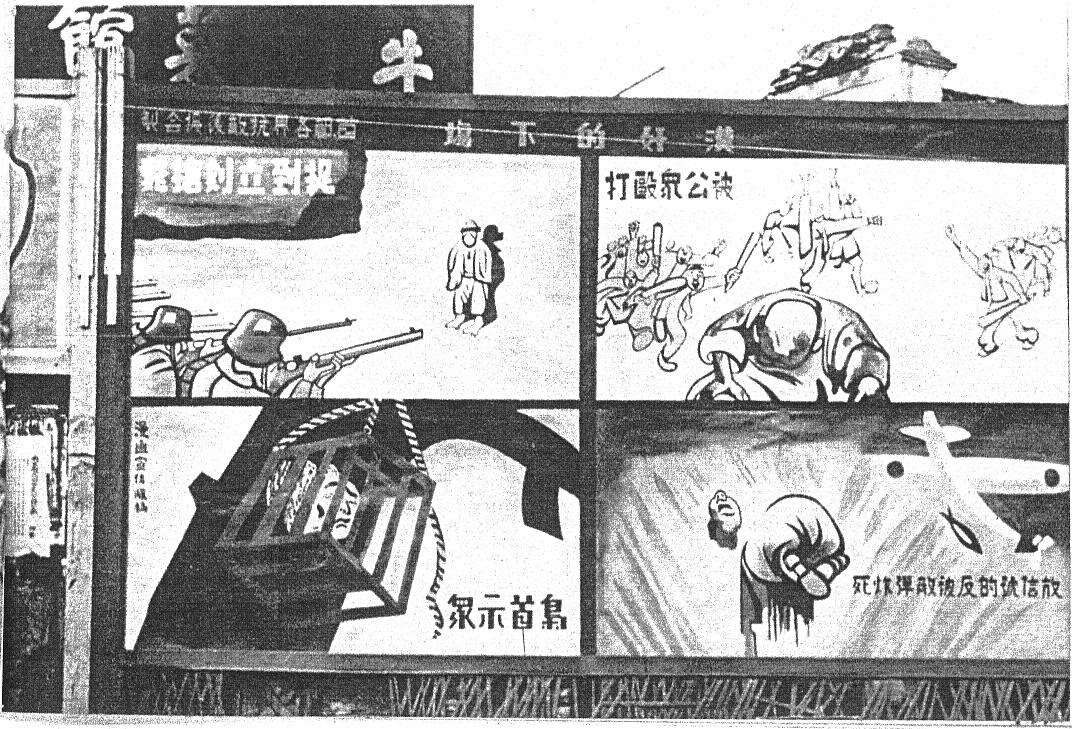
Propaganda poster in Nanking depicting the fate of traitors

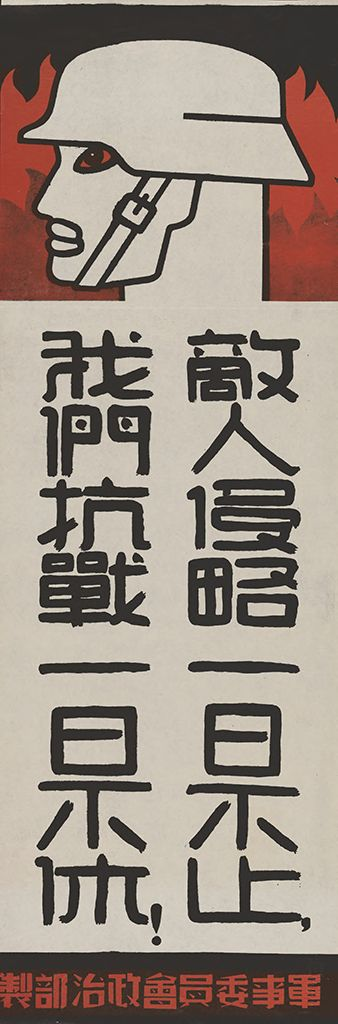
"Every day the enemy does not stop its aggression is a day in which our resistance will not cease."

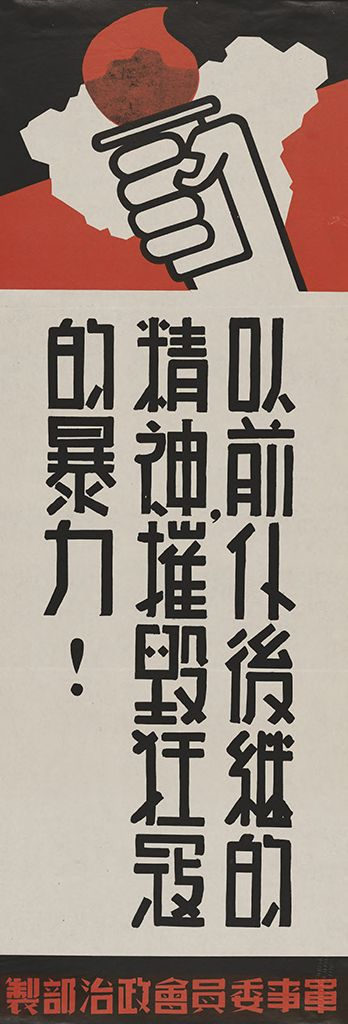
"The spirit of the past destroys the violence of the arrogant."

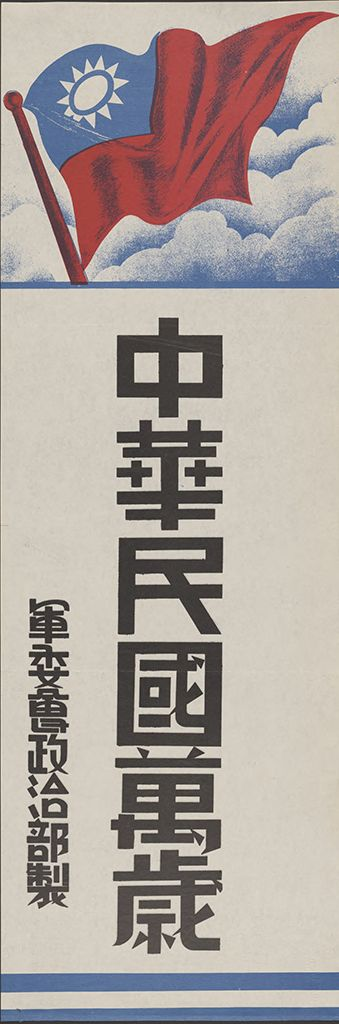
"Long live the Republic of China!"

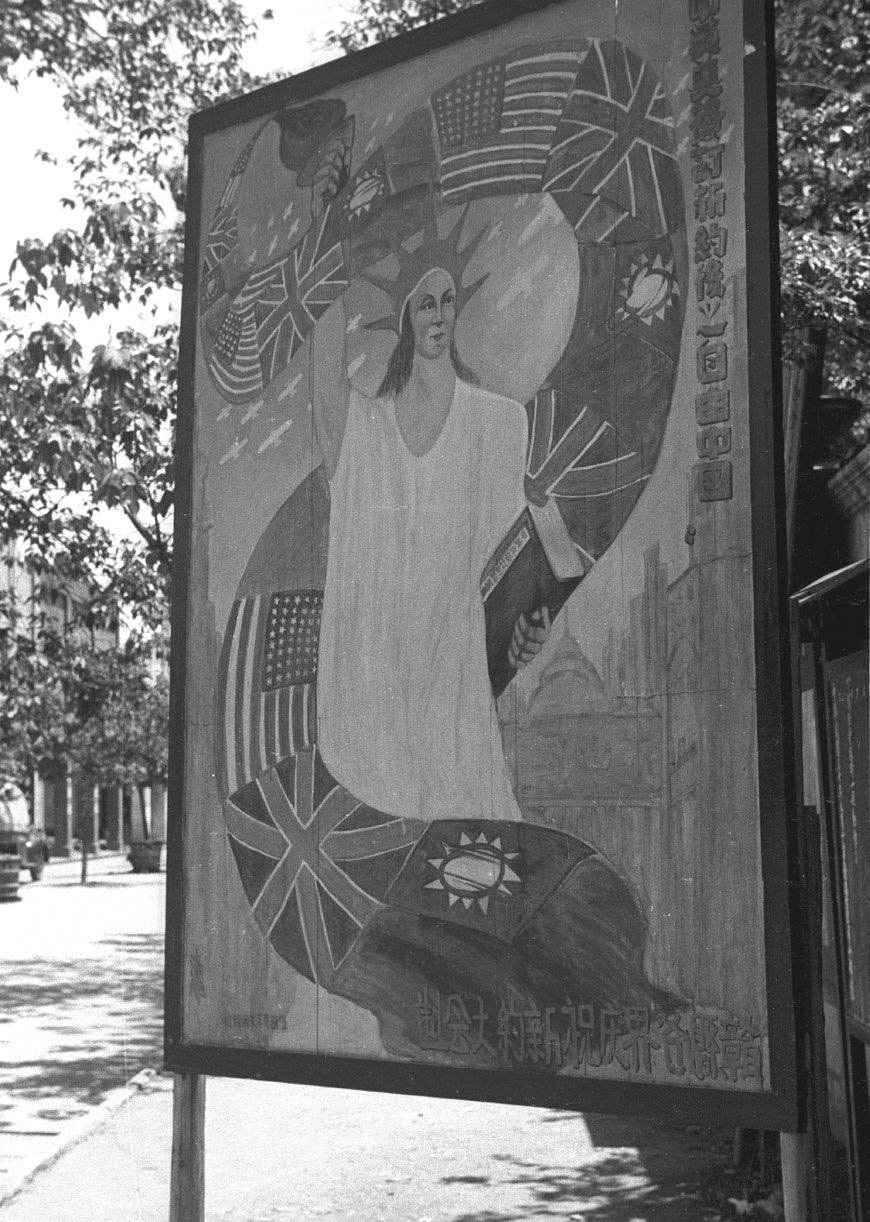
Pro-Allied forces poster. The Soviet Union is omitted.

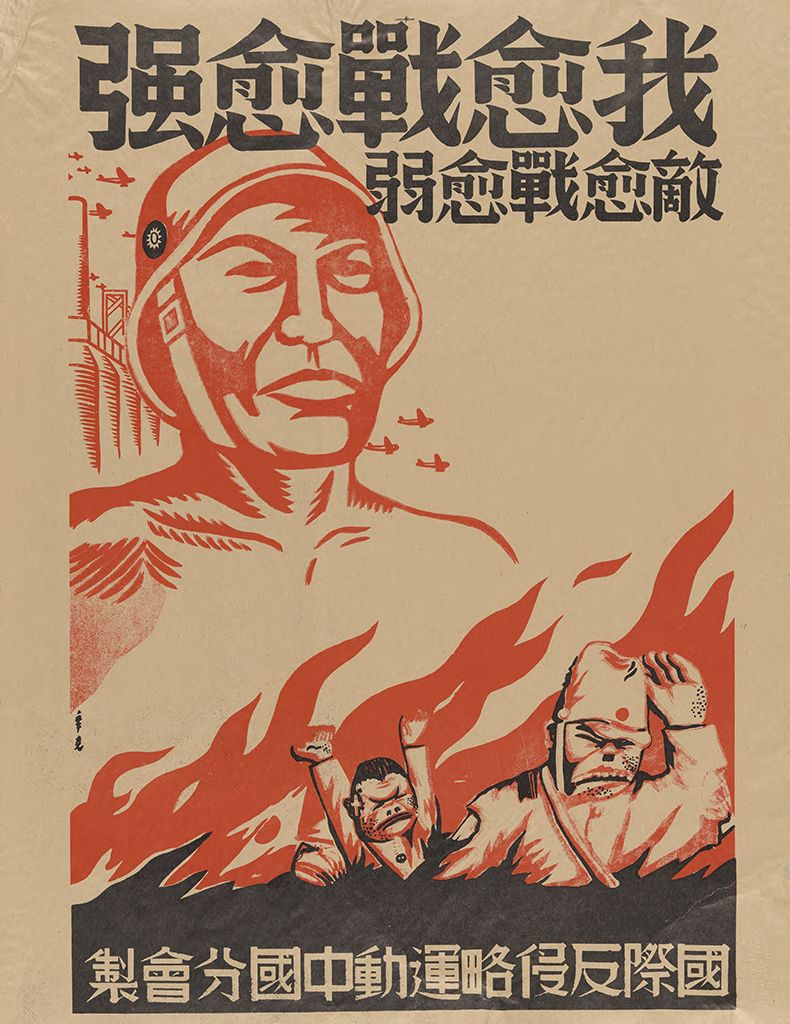
"The more I fight, the stronger I become. The more the enemy fights, the weaker he becomes."

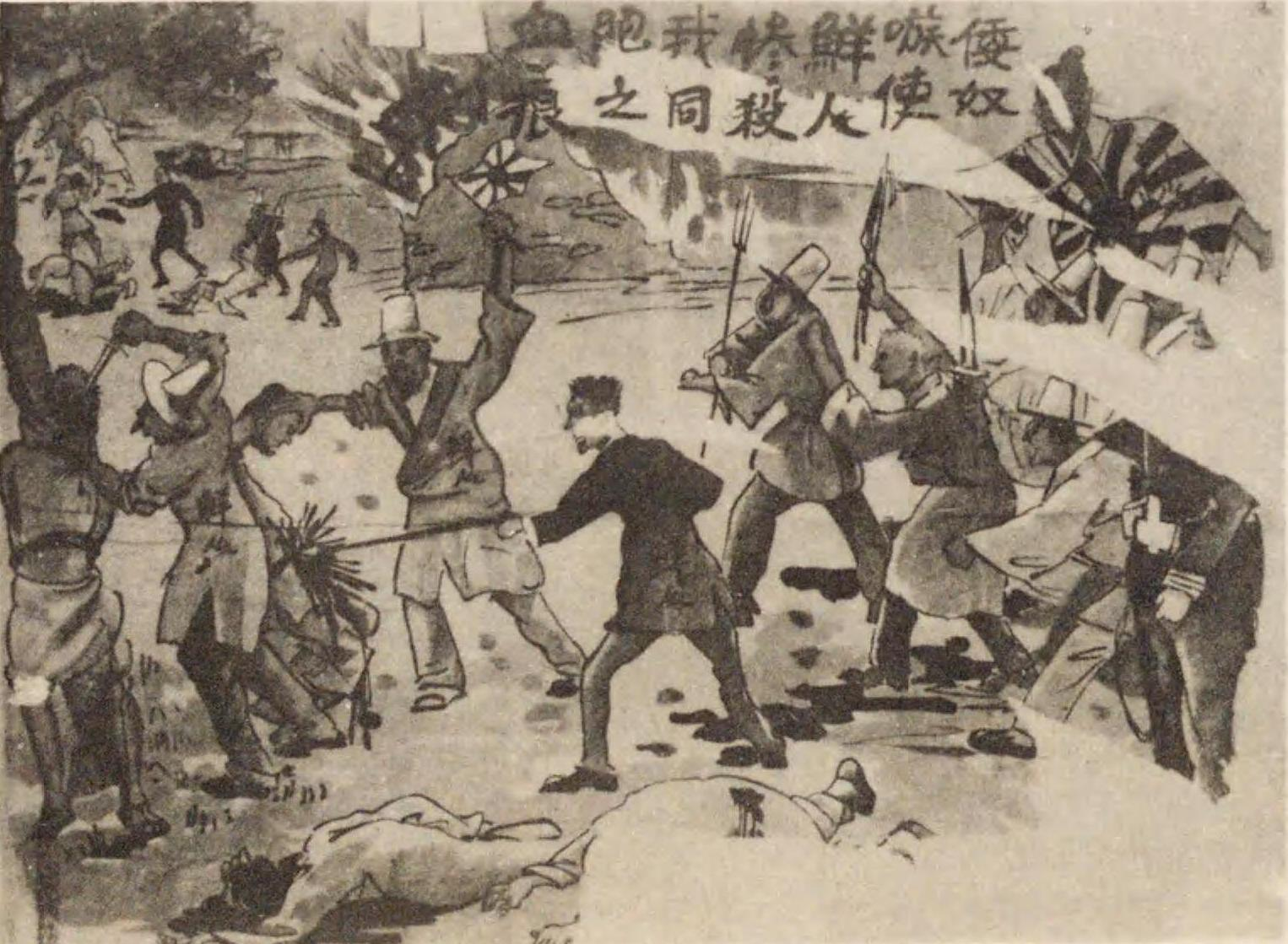
Anti-Japanese propaganda poster published after revenge by Koreans in the Wanpaoshan Incident

=== Political ===
==== In mainland China ====
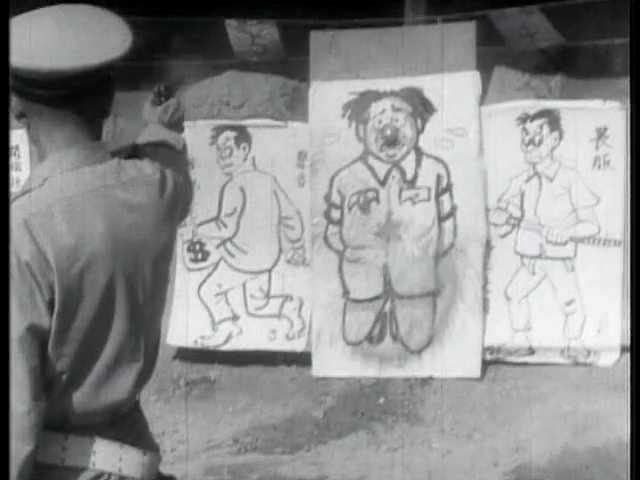
A soldier shooting caricatures of communist leader Mao Zedong.

The Kuomintang used both anti-communist and anti-capitalist propaganda. During the Chinese Civil War, propaganda was extensively used against the Chinese Communist Party (CCP), both to discredit communist ideologies as well as to counter attempts by the CCP to depict the Kuomintang leadership as capitalist. Under the rule of Chiang Kai-shek, propaganda was used to promote Chiangist ideology.

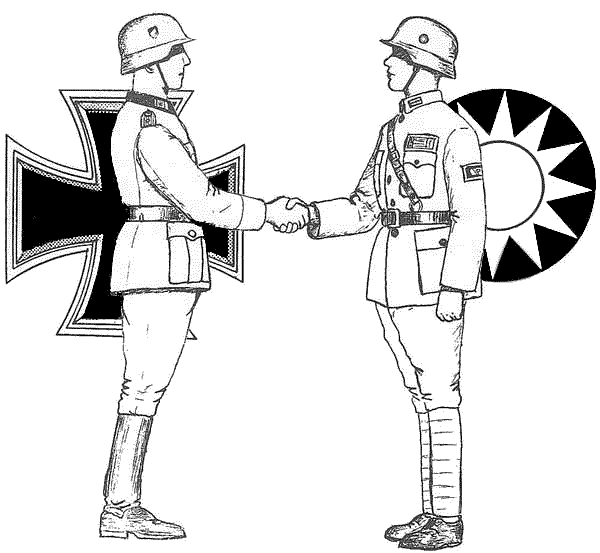
Propaganda promoting Sino-German cooperation

Chiang Kai-shek attacked the CCP in 1943 with the propaganda piece China's Destiny, which questioned the legitimacy of the CCP. The CCP opposed Chiang's leadership and accused his regime of fascism.

==== In Taiwan ====
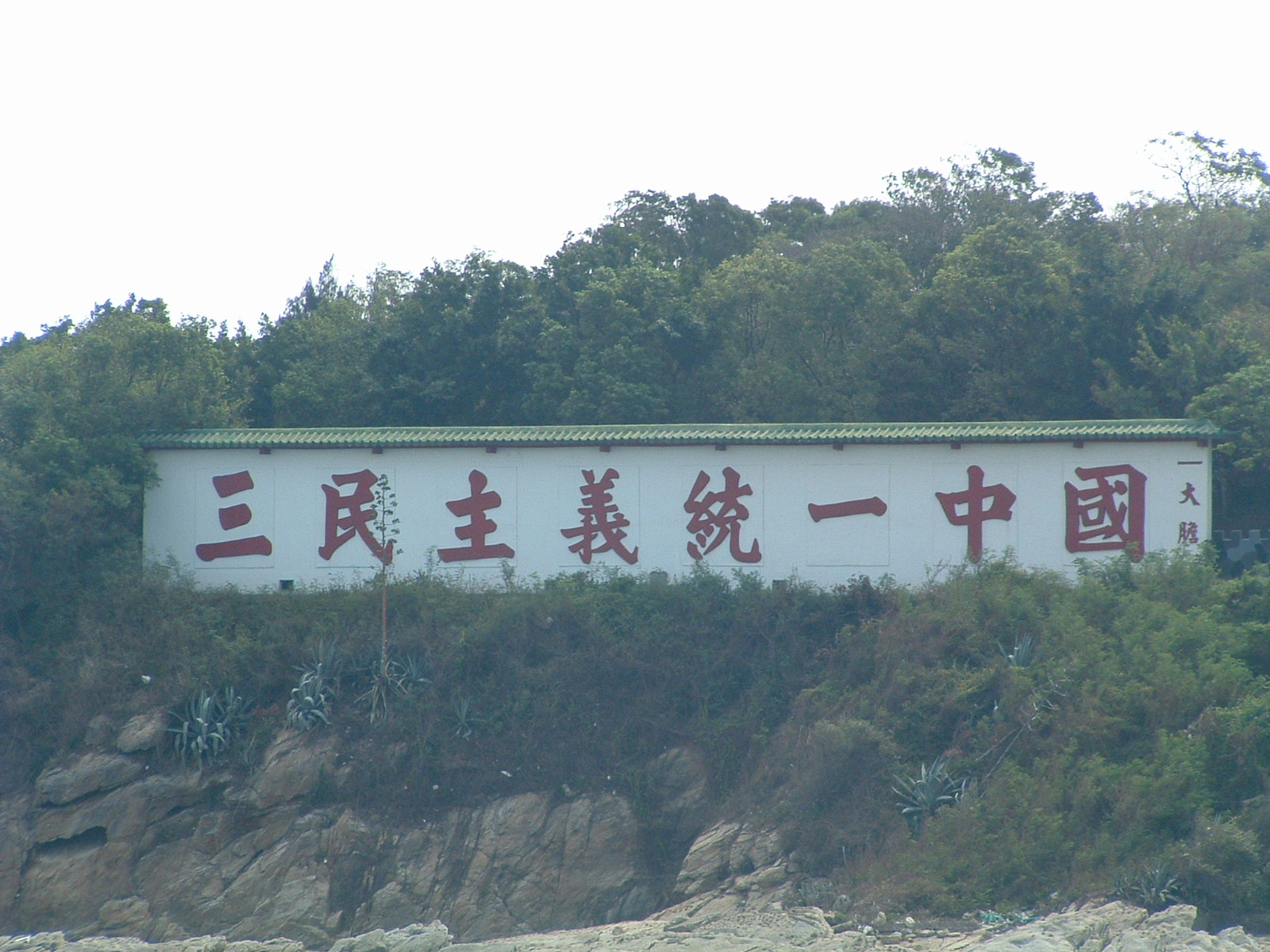
A propaganda sign on Kinmen facing Mainland China proclaiming "Three Principles of the People unite China"

One of the main tools for disseminating propaganda in Taiwan has been the Government Information Office and the various media properties controlled by the Kuomintang and the government. Besides controlling commercial television and radio stations, a police radio station often broadcast "educational" plays with propagandistic value and a film bureau. After the Kuomintang fled to Taiwan, propaganda through public education in Taiwan was an important tool in creating a Chinese national identity among Taiwanese and preparing the people for "a counter-offensive" against the PRC. Although the government is now democratic, the legacy of authoritarian rule has created a confusion of identity in Taiwan, both with many adults having grown up thinking that the ROC would launch a "counter-offensive" against the PRC and with Mandarin becoming the most common language. Previously, the people had been educated in the evils of the Communists and the good of the Nationalists, with many Taiwanese remembering lore taught in elementary school on the wisdom of Chiang Kai-shek.

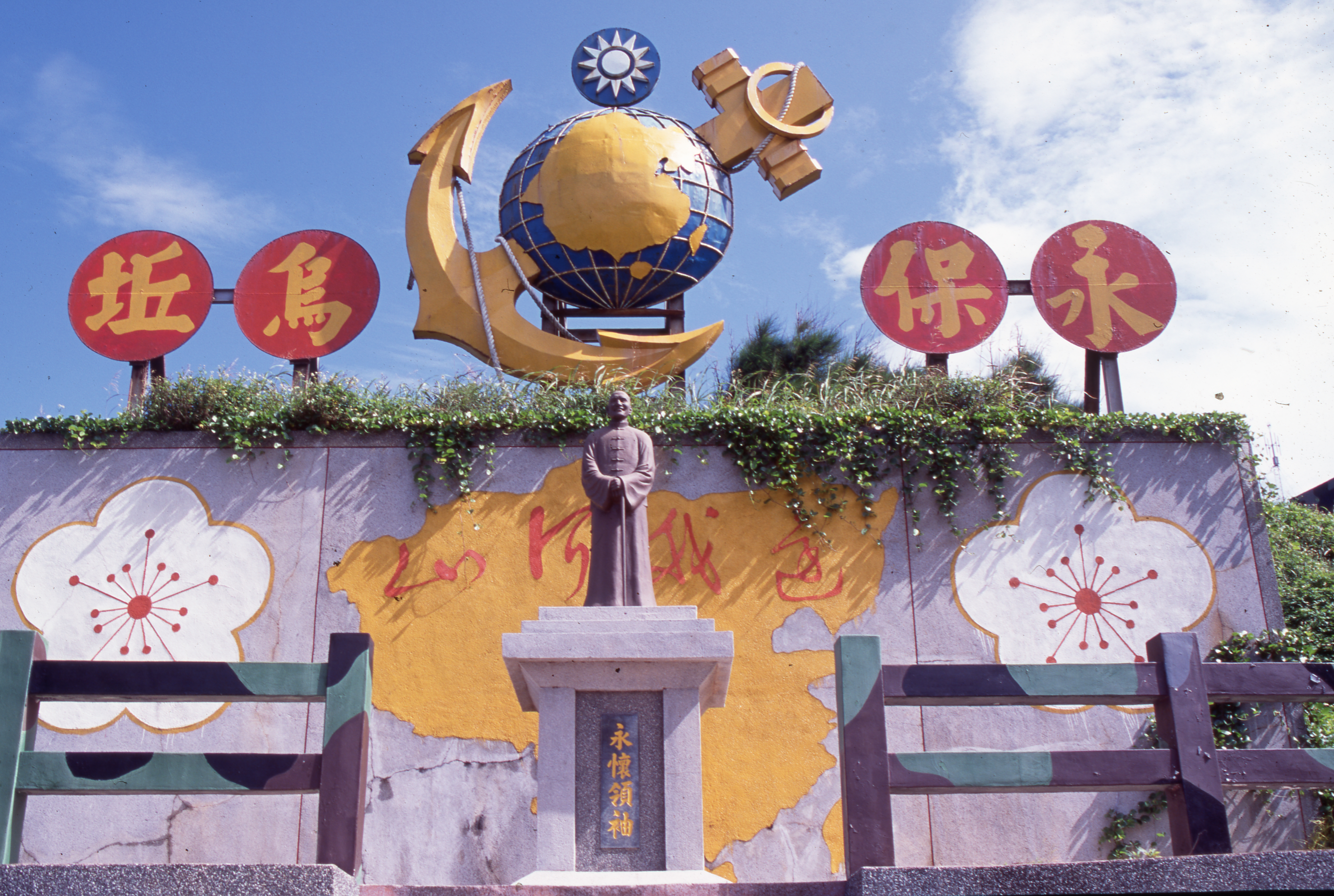
A monument in Wuqiu with the territorial claims of the Republic of China

The Kuomintang also published numerous publications after its retreat to Taiwan, including the Free China Journal. Its popularity soared, as the editors and writers analyzed political situations at the time and sometimes even advised or criticized the government in earnest.

Occasionally, the ROC has attempted to spread propaganda into PRC-controlled areas, usually in the form of leaflet drops over coastal provinces that call for the locals to rebel against CCP rule and are accompanied by the promise that the ROC will one day liberate the mainland. That proved to be ineffective and after several years was largely discontinued.

The Government Information Office was replaced after democratization with the National Communications Commission, an agency styled after the Federal Communications Commission in the United States. Most of today's films in Taiwan are Hollywood movies, and all theaters are commercially-run for-profit enterprises. Some activities of the Taiwanese government have been described as propaganda. Much of it has been directed against the People's Republic of China.

== Propaganda campaigns abroad ==
According to a 1979 report by the United States Senate Foreign Relations Committee, the Taiwan government operated one of the two most active anti-dissident networks within the United States, including large-scale propaganda campaigns implemented through front organizations, among other espionage activities.

== Media ==
=== Radio ===
Established in 1928, The Nationalist Government Radio Station was a major mechanism for disseminating ROC propaganda messages. The ROC also established a program to place listening stations in rural counties where radio monitors would listen to news and propaganda broadcasts to transcribe items for printing in local newspapers and posting on public walls or blackboards.

=== Films ===
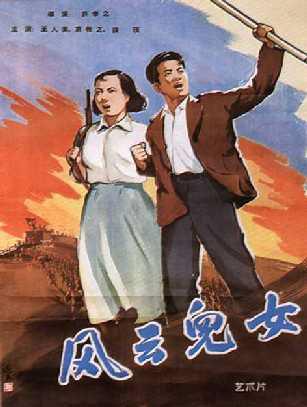
Children of Troubled Times poster.

In the Republic of China, movies were created even during wartime, such as Mulan Joins the Army (1939) with its story of a young Chinese peasant fighting against a foreign invasion, and Children of Troubled Times (1935), a patriotic Chinese film about the Japanese invasion of China, and known for being the origin of the "March of the Volunteers", now the national anthem of the People's Republic of China.

=== Patriotic songs ===
Several songs written in the Republic of China had patriotic messages. Some, such as 800 Heroes Song, Guerrillas' Song, and The Sword March, were written during the Second Sino-Japanese War, and others, such as Go and Reclaim the Mainland and The Anti-Communist and Anti-Russian Aggression Song, were written with anti-communist messages.

== See also ==
- Cross-Strait war of propaganda
- Cinema of China
- Propaganda in the People's Republic of China
- Propaganda in Japan during the Second Sino-Japanese War and World War II
- Voice of Free China
- Radio Taiwan International
