= The Anti-Communist and Anti-Russian Aggression Song =

1952 song by Chiang Kai-shek

The Anti-Communist and Anti-Russian Aggression Song (Chinese: 反共抗俄歌; Wade–Giles: fan³kung⁴ kʻang⁴ o² ko¹; lit. 'anti-communist and resistance to Russians song'), also known as Fighting Communism and Rebuilding the Nation Song (Chinese: 反共復國歌; Wade–Giles: fan³kung⁴ fu⁴kuo² ko¹; lit. 'anti-communist and national restoration song') is a Chinese anti-communist and anti-Soviet patriotic song written by Chiang Kai-shek and composed by Xiao Huahua. The song was written in the early 1950s by Chiang to promote anti-communism against the Chinese Communist Party and Soviet Union, and was mandatory learning in the Taiwanese musical curriculum from 1952 until 1975.

== Lyrics ==
Traditional Chinese	Simplified Chinese	Pinyin	Wade–Giles	English Translation
打倒俄寇，反共產，反共產 消滅朱毛，殺漢奸，殺漢奸 收復大陸，解救同胞， 服從領袖，完成革命； 三民主義實行， 中華民國復興； 中華復興，民國萬歲；中華民國萬萬歲！	打倒俄寇，反共产，反共产 消灭朱毛，杀汉奸，杀汉奸 收复大陆，解救同胞， 服从领袖，完成革命； 三民主义实行， 中华民国复兴； 中华复兴，民国万岁；中华民国万万岁！	Dǎdǎo é kòu, fǎn gòngchǎn, fǎn gòngchǎn, Xiāomiè Zhū Máo, shā hànjiān, shā hànjiān, Shōufù dàlù, jiějiù tóngbāo, Fúcóng lǐngxiù, wánchéng gémìng; Sānmín zhǔyì shíxíng, Zhōnghuá Mínguó fùxīng; Zhōnghuá fùxīng, Mínguó wànsuì; Zhōnghuá Mínguó wàn wàn suì!	Ta-tao ê kou, fan kung-chan, fan kung-chan Chiao-mieh chu mao, sha han-chian, sha han-chian, Shou-fu ta-lu, chieh-chiu t'ung-pao, Fu-ts'ung ling-chiu, wan-cheng ko-ming; San-min chu-i, shih-hsing, Chung-hua Min-kuo fu-hsing; Chung-hua fu-hsing, Min-kuo wan-sui; Chung-hua Min-kuo wan wan sui!	Down with the Russian bandits, oppose communism, oppose communism, Eliminate Zhu and Mao, kill traitors, kill traitors, Reclaim the mainland, save our compatriots, Obey the leader, complete the revolution, Implement the Three Principles of the People, Rejuvenate the Republic of China, Revive China, long live the republic, long live the Republic of China!

== See also ==
- Anti-communism in China (Anti-People's Republic of China)
- 800 Heroes Song
- Oppose communism and revitalize the nation (反共復國)
- Go and Reclaim the Mainland
- Project National Glory
- "Taiwan is Good"
- "Chiang Kai-shek Memorial Song"
- "Ode to the Republic of China"
- "Night Raid"
