= Anti-China sentiment =

Anti-China sentiment (Chinese: 反華) may refer to either of the following:

- Anti-Chinese sentiment, a dislike, hatred, hostility, or discrimination against Chinese people or Chinese culture
- Anti–People's Republic of China sentiment, a dislike of the People's Republic of China (PRC) as a nation, or opposition to its government, its social system, the Chinese Communist Party, or the people of the nation under the PRC regime of 1949–present
