= Anti–People's Republic of China sentiment =

Opposition to the Chinese government

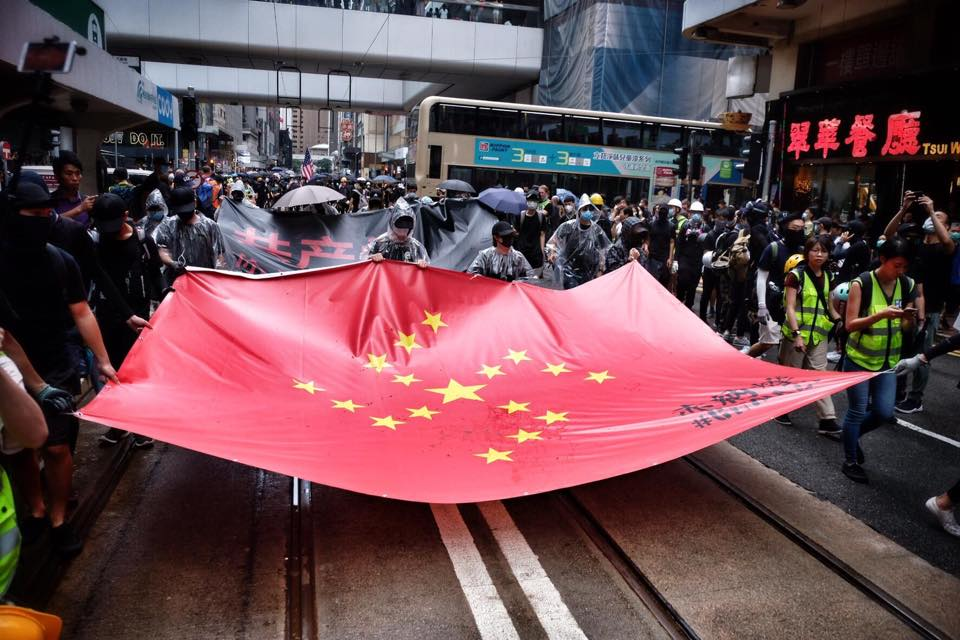
- "Chinazi" flag during Hong Kong's protest in August 2019
- Simplified Chinese: 反中华人民共和国
- Traditional Chinese: 反中華人民共和國
Transcriptions
Standard Mandarin
- Hanyu Pinyin: fǎn Zhōnghuá rénmín gònghéguó
- Bopomofo: ㄈㄢˇ ㄓㄨㄥ ㄏㄨㄚˊ ㄖㄣˊ ㄇㄧㄣˊ ㄍㄨㄥˋ ㄏㄜˊ ㄍㄨㄛˊ
- Wade–Giles: fan^{3} Chung^{1}hua^{2} Jên^{2}min^{2} Kung^{4}ho^{2}kuo^{2}

Alternative Chinese name
- Simplified Chinese: 反中
- Traditional Chinese: 反中
- Literal meaning: Anti-China
Transcriptions
Standard Mandarin
- Hanyu Pinyin: fǎn zhōng
- Bopomofo: ㄈㄢˇ ㄓㄨㄥ
- Wade–Giles: fan^{3} Chung^{1}

Second alternative Chinese name
- Simplified Chinese: 反华
- Traditional Chinese: 反華
Transcriptions
Standard Mandarin
- Hanyu Pinyin: fǎn huá
- Bopomofo: ㄈㄢˇ ㄏㄨㄚˊ

Third alternative Chinese name
- Simplified Chinese: 抗中
- Traditional Chinese: 抗中
- Literal meaning: resist China
Transcriptions
Standard Mandarin
- Hanyu Pinyin: kàng zhōng
- Bopomofo: ㄎㄤˋ ㄓㄨㄥ
- Wade–Giles: kʻang^{4}chung^{1}

Fourth alternative Chinese name
- Simplified Chinese: 反共
- Traditional Chinese: 反共
- Literal meaning: Anti-Communist (China)
Transcriptions
Standard Mandarin
- Hanyu Pinyin: fǎn gòng
- Bopomofo: ㄈㄢˇ ㄍㄨㄥˋ
- Wade–Giles: fan^{3}kung^{4}

Anti–People's Republic of China sentiment (Chinese: 反中華人民共和國), also known as anti-China (Chinese: 反中 or 反華), (Note: Opposition to the PRC is sometimes referred to as 反華. However, some authors draw a distinction between 反中 and 反華, and 反華 can encompass both "anti-PRC sentiment" and "anti-Chinese racism".) anti-PRC (Chinese: 抗中), anti-CCP, or anti-Beijing sentiment, is antipathy to the People's Republic of China (PRC). "Anti-PRC" is different from "anti-Chinese sentiment" in cultural and ethnic contexts, but they sometimes appear at the same time and are described as "Sinophobia".

Reasons cited for opposing the People's Republic of China include the policies of its government and the ruling Chinese Communist Party (CCP), the suppression of democracy in China, human rights abuses, intelligence activities, diplomatic practices, threats to dissidents, oppression of secessionist movements, as well as negative impressions of its nationals.

Concerns over the increasing economic and military power of China, its technological prowess and cultural reach, as well as international influence, has been attributed to drive negative media coverage of China. This is often also exhibited by policymakers and politicians.

== Statistics and background ==
Results of 2026 Pew Research Center poll "% who have a(n) favorable/unfavorable opinion of China" (default-sorted by decreasing negativity of each country)
Country polled	Favorable	Unfavorable	Difference
Japan	11%	88%	-77
Israel	19%	73%	-54
Sweden	27%	71%	-44
United States	27%	71%	-44
South Korea	28%	71%	-43
Australia	31%	67%	-36
Germany	33%	64%	-31
India	23%	54%	-31
Netherlands	34%	59%	-25
France	36%	58%	-22
Philippines	40%	57%	-17
Canada	44%	51%	-7
Turkey	43%	50%	-7
United Kingdom	46%	52%	-6
Poland	39%	41%	-2
Italy	51%	46%	+5
Brazil	46%	40%	+6
Chile	49%	36%	+13
Hungary	53%	40%	+13
South Africa	52%	38%	+14
Spain	54%	39%	+15
Argentina	50%	32%	+18
Bangladesh	56%	33%	+23
Greece	55%	32%	+23
West Bank	57%	27%	+30
Mexico	59%	28%	+31
Peru	61%	26%	+35
Ghana	64%	29%	+35
Thailand	69%	30%	+39
Colombia	63%	23%	+40
Indonesia	72%	28%	+44
Singapore	73%	27%	+46
Malaysia	75%	25%	+50
Sri Lanka	72%	11%	+62
Kenya	76%	20%	+56
Nigeria	78%	17%	+61
Pakistan	90%	7%	+83

In 2026, Pew Research Center from the United States conducted a survey on feelings on China, finding that China was viewed favorably in the majority (22 of 37) of the nations surveyed. Across the surveyed countries, a median of 51% held a favorable view of China, while 39% held an unfavorable view.

=== Anti-China sentiment ===
Anti-China sentiment has been clearly evident in the West and other Asian countries. In the 2013 Pew Research survey, only 28% of Germans and Italians and 37% of Americans viewed China favorably while in Japan, just 5% of respondents had a favorable opinion of the country. 11 of the 38 nations viewed China unfavorably by more than 50%. Japan was polled to have the most anti-China sentiment, where 93% saw the People's Republic in a negative light. There were also majorities in Germany (64%), Italy (62%), and Israel (60%) who held negative views of China. Germany saw a large increase of anti-China sentiment, from 33% disfavor in 2006 to 64% in the 2013 survey, with such views existing despite Germany's success in exporting to China. Anti-PRC rhetoric in English-speaking countries tends to flow from security agencies to governments to the media.

=== Positive views of China ===
Respondents in the Balkans have held generally positive views of China, according to 2020 polling. An International Republican Institute survey from February to March found that only in Kosovo (75%) did most respondents express an unfavourable opinion of the country, while majorities in Serbia (85%), Montenegro (68%), North Macedonia (56%), and Bosnia (52%) expressed favourable views. A GLOBSEC poll on October found that the highest percentage of those who saw China as a threat were in the Czech Republic (51%), Poland (34%), and Hungary (24%), while it was seen as least threatening in Balkan countries such as Bulgaria (3%), Serbia (13%), and North Macedonia (14%). Reasons for threat perception were generally linked to the country's economic influence.

According to Arab Barometer polls, views of China in the Arab world have been relatively positive, with data from March to April 2021 showing that most respondents in Algeria (65%), Morocco (62%), Libya (60%), Tunisia (59%), and Iraq (56%) held favourable views of the country while views were less favourable in Lebanon (38%) and Jordan (34%).

=== Impact of COVID pandemic ===
Global polling in 2020 amidst the COVID-19 pandemic reported a decrease in favourable views of China, with an Ipsos poll done in November finding those in Russia (81%), Mexico (72%), Malaysia (68%), Peru (67%) and Saudi Arabia (65%) were most likely to believe China's future influence would be positive, while those in Great Britain (19%), Canada (21%), Germany (24%), Australia (24%), Japan (24%), the United States (24%) and France (24%) were least likely. A YouGov poll on August found that those in Nigeria (70%), Thailand (64%), Mexico (61%), and Egypt (55%) had more positive views of China regarding world affairs while those in Japan (7%), Denmark (13%), Britain (13%), Sweden (14%), and other Western countries had the least positive views.

== History ==
=== Mao era and Cold War ===
In 1949, when the Second Chinese Civil War was terminated and the People's Republic of China (PRC) was established in mainland China, the existing Republic of China (ROC) retreated to Taiwan. However, in the early Cold War, the PRC was not recognized by many Western countries and was often referred to as "Red China", with the ROC being called "Free China". Until 1971, according to the permanent members of the United Nations Security Council (which consisted of the ROC, France, the Soviet Union, the United Kingdom, and the United States), 'China' was the ROC controlling Taiwan, not the PRC controlling mainland China. At the time, the Republic of China and its Western allies openly opposed the PRC, asserting that the ROC was the only legitimate 'China'.

During the Cold War, anti-Chinese sentiment became a permanent fixture in the media of the Western world and anti-communist countries following the establishment of the People's Republic of China in 1949. From the 1950s to the 1980s, anti-Chinese sentiment was high in South Korea as a result of the Chinese intervention against the South Korean army in the Korean War (1950–1953).

In the Soviet Union, anti-Chinese sentiment became high following the hostile political relations between the PRC and the USSR from the late 1950s onward, which nearly escalated into war between the two countries in 1969. The "Chinese threat", as it was described in a letter by Alexander Solzhenitsyn, prompted expressions of anti-Chinese sentiment in the Russian dissident samizdat movement.

"Anti-CCP" can be used in a similar sense to "anti-PRC" due to the country being a one-party state.

=== After the reform and opening up ===
As the People's Republic of China's external power grows under sustained economic growth, the surrounding countries have become more concerned about the external expansion of the People's Republic of China through state capitalism, and its long-term tendency towards hegemony and neo-imperialism, with its nationalistic sentiments and territorial disputes with neighboring countries, which has led to the emergence of Chinese threat theories within each country. For example, the Sunflower Student Movement in Taiwan reflects the anxiety of Taiwanese young people in Taiwan about the threat of China, especially the influence of China on Taiwan's internal democratic development through its political and economic power. 2012, when Tsai Ing-wen, chairman of the Democratic Progressive Party (DPP) of Taiwan, and Wang Dan, an exiled dissident from China, had a conversation, Tsai Ing-wen suggested that the DPP was not against China, but against the hegemony and undemocratic nature of the People's Republic of China. Andrew Chubb traces a shift in rhetoric surrounding China in Australia, which he refers to as the securitization of Chinese influence, to the political campaign of Prime Minister Malcolm Turnbull. The use of anti-PRC rhetoric by the Turnbull campaign had the end-impact of creating a "a 'toxic environment' for Chinese-Australians, especially in public and political life" and worsened relations between Australia and China. Chubb notes that this trend of securitzation of discourse, flowing from intelligence agencies to politicians to the media is replicated in other English-speaking Liberal democracies.

== Definition and interpretation of anti–PRC sentiment ==
Opposition to the People's Republic of China does not necessarily equate to opposition to or disapproval of the Chinese people or culture, but "anti-PRC" is often equated with "anti-Chinese" because the government of the People's Republic of China is considered by most countries in the international arena to be the sole legitimate government of China and the sole representative of the Chinese people in China. The PRC government equates its counter-discussion of its regime or policies with "anti-Chinese" (反華), which means total rejection and opposition to China, its Chinese people or culture. In Hong Kong, for example, pro-Communists have launched a website called Against the pan-Democrats, for the sake of Hong Kong (反泛民，救香港), which categorizes pan-Democrats as anti-Chinese "Hanjian scum" (漢奸人渣) and "anti-China and stirring up trouble in Hong Kong" (反中亂港).

In The Third Chinese Imagination: The Chinese Factor and Democracy in Taiwan (第三種中國想像：中國因素與台灣民主), published by Wu Jiemin (吳介民), an associate researcher at Academia Sinica in Taiwan, it was argued that the People's Republic of China (PRC) factor threatened the development of Taiwanese democracy. However, he advocated treating the government of the People's Republic of China and the mainland Chinese people separately, and believed that a third way should be established between the two directions of pro-PRC and anti-PRC. He hoped that Taiwan would have positive interactions with democrats and civic organizations in mainland China, and would not only focus on the government of the PRC and the Chinese Communist Party. Former Democratic Progressive Party (DPP) Chairman Frank Hsieh was interviewed by China Times on January 14, 2014; he believes that although Taiwan is opposed to being ruled by the PRC government, this sentiment should not be extended to the Chinese people, and should not be negative towards spouses or students from mainland China who come to Taiwan to study and survive. Lin Yi-hsiung, also the former chairman of the DPP, advocated that Taiwan should develop positive interactions with the People's Republic of China and refrain from engaging in international political confrontation, a view supported by the celebrity Dong Zhisen.

== By region ==
=== Greater China ===
==== Hong Kong ====
After the victory of the Chinese Communist Party in the Chinese Civil War, some anti-Communist Mainlanders moved southward to Hong Kong to establish their roots, including members of the Kuomintang, intellectuals and capitalists. Tens of thousands moved to Hong Kong in 1949 to escape the Chinese Communist Revolution. The population of Hong Kong increased from 1.8 million in 1947 to 2.2 million in 1951. As mainland Chinese fled to Hong Kong over the next 30 years, the population of Hong Kong increased by 1 million every 10 years. Those who experienced hunger and political struggle under the Chinese Communist Party (CCP) internalized stronger anti-communist sentiments than Hong Kongers who did not experience CCP rule.

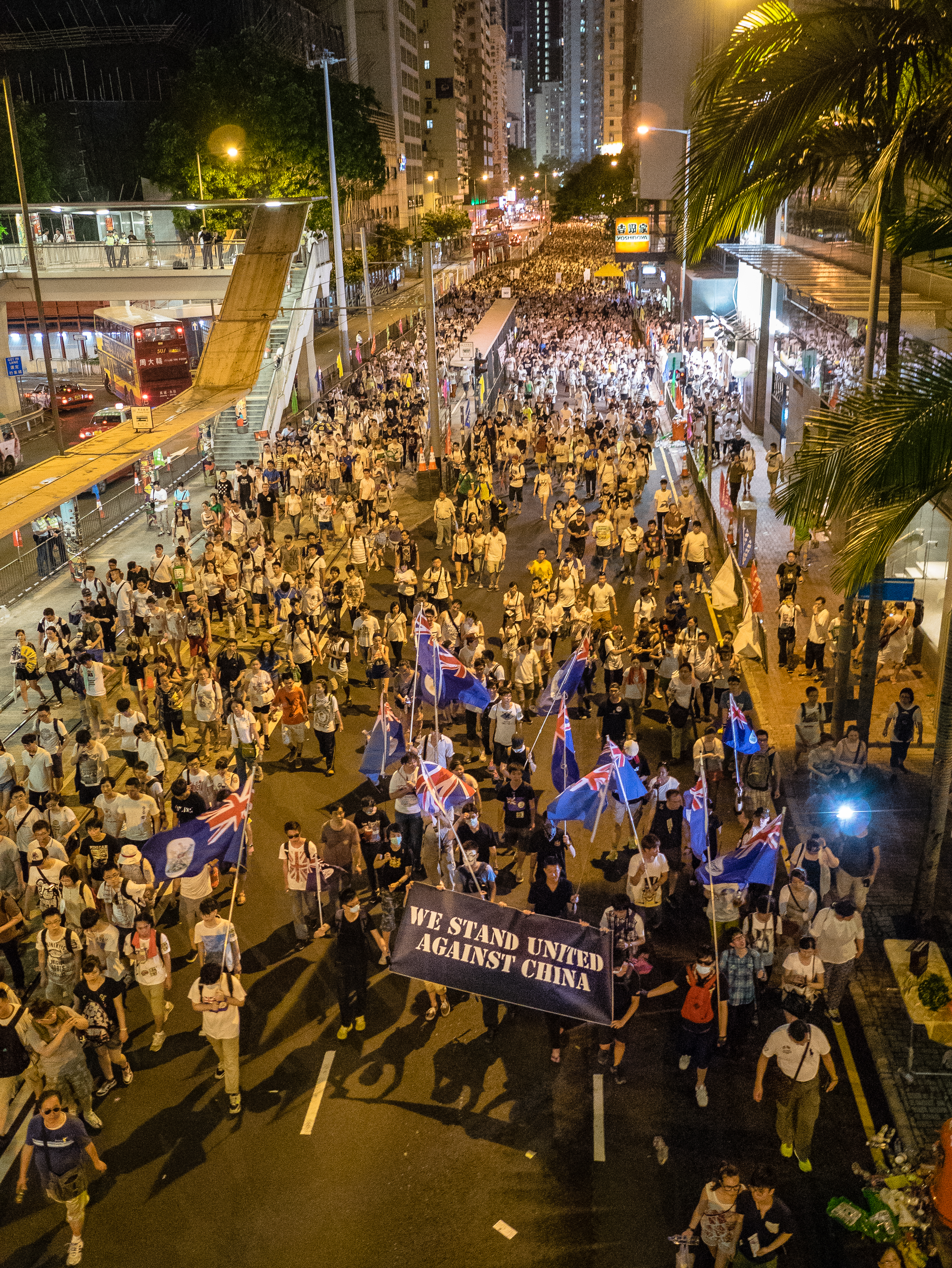
Hong Kong marches on 1 July, 2014. The sign reads, "We stand united against China".

Although Hong Kong's sovereignty was returned to China in 1997, only a small minority of its inhabitants consider themselves to be exclusively Chinese. According to a 2014 survey from the University of Hong Kong, 42.3% of respondents identified themselves as "Hong Kong citizens", versus only 17.8% who identified themselves as "Chinese citizens", and 39.3% gave themselves a mixed identity (a Hong Kong Chinese or a Hong Konger who was living in China). By 2019, almost no Hong Kong youth identified as Chinese.

The number of mainland Chinese visitors to the region has surged since the handover (reaching 28 million in 2011) and is perceived by many locals to be the cause of their housing and job difficulties. In addition to resentment due to political oppression, negative perceptions have grown through circulating online posts of mainlander misbehaviour, as well as discriminatory discourse in major Hong Kong newspapers. In 2013, polls from the University of Hong Kong suggested that 32 to 35.6 per cent of locals had "negative" feelings for mainland Chinese people. However, a 2019 survey of Hong Kong residents has suggested that there are also some who attribute positive stereotypes to visitors from the mainland.

In a 2015 study, mainland students in Hong Kong who initially had a more positive view of the city than of their own mainland hometowns reported that their attempts at connecting with the locals were difficult due to experiences of hostility.

The localist camp, and sometimes the pro-democracy camp, are called the "anti-Beijing camp".

==== Mainland China ====
In the 1980s, in the face of a high level of economic disparity with Hong Kong, Taiwan, and Western countries compared to mainland China, some Chinese society and intellectuals followed the overall Westernization theory.

The modern cultural trend of the Chinese continent in the 1980s, represented by the documentary River Elegy that preceded the 1989 Tiananmen Incident, completely denied China and Chinese civilizations.

In the 21st century, against the backdrop of China's economic rise and strengthening of its national power, Chinese society has become dominated by nationalist sentiments.

==== Xinjiang ====
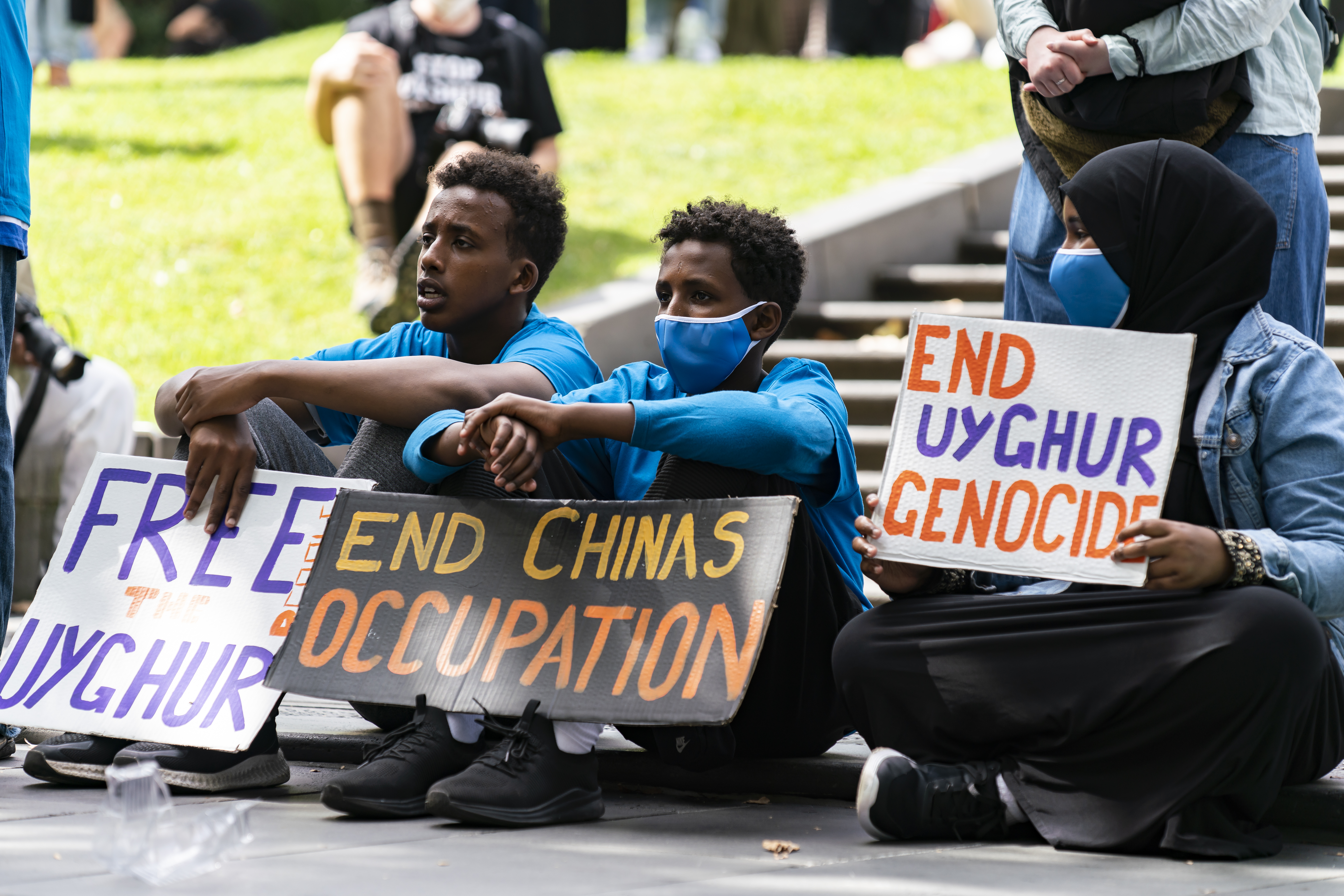
A Uygur protest in Melbourne, Australia

After the Incorporation of Xinjiang into the People's Republic of China under Mao Zedong to establish the PRC in 1949, there have been considerable ethnic tensions arising between the Han Chinese and Turkic Muslim Uyghurs. This manifested itself in the 1997 Ghulja incident, the bloody July 2009 Ürümqi riots, and the 2014 Kunming attack. China has since suppressed the native population and created re-education camps for purported counter-terrorism efforts, which have further fueled resentment in the region.

==== Taiwan ====
After 1949, due to the defeat in the Chinese Civil War, the Republic of China (ROC) government under the Kuomintang (KMT) retreated to Taiwan, claiming that it still had full sovereignty over mainland China; the People's Republic of China (PRC), which was established in mainland China, also claimed to be the sole legitimate representative of China, claiming sovereignty over all Chinese territories (including Taiwan), but it has not yet been able to rule Taiwan. Many young people in Taiwan identify solely as "Taiwanese". They are wary of closer ties with China, like those in the Sunflower Student Movement. According to a 2020 survey from Taiwan's Mainland Affairs Council, Taiwanese believe that China is unfriendly to Taiwan.

Taiwan's main political parties, the Democratic Progressive Party (DPP) are some described as "anti-China". The DPP is expressing its opposition to Chinese "imperialism" and "colonialism".

In 2016, "Islanders' Anti-China Coalition", a radical anti-communist organization, was formed; they actively support Taiwan, Hong Kong, and Inner Mongolian independence.

As of 2026, many young Taiwanese people see their country as an independent country distinct from China, but there is analysis suggesting that less anti-China sentiment is emerging than in previous generations.

==== Tibet ====
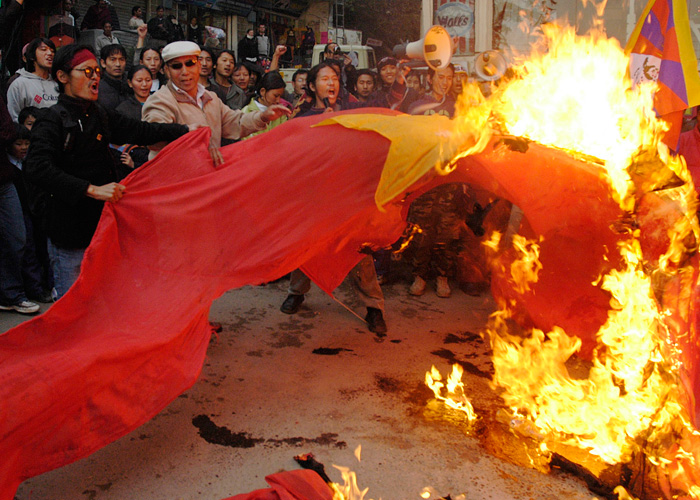
Anti-Chinese government protest by Tibetans in India in 2008

Tibet has complicated relations with the rest of China. Both Tibetan and Chinese are part of the Sino-Tibetan language family and share a long history. The Tang dynasty and Tibetan Empire did enter into periods of military conflict. In the 13th century, Tibet fell under the rule of the Yuan dynasty but it ceased to be with the collapse of the Yuan dynasty. The relationship between Tibet with China remains complicated until Tibet was invaded again by the Qing dynasty. Following the British expedition to Tibet in 1904, many Tibetans look back on it as an exercise of Tibetan self-defense and an act of independence from the Qing dynasty, as the dynasty was falling apart. This event has left a dark chapter in their modern relations. The Republic of China failed to reconquer Tibet but the later People's Republic of China annexed Tibet and incorporated it as the Tibet Autonomous Region within China. The 14th Dalai Lama and Mao Zedong signed the Seventeen Point Agreement for the Peaceful Liberation of Tibet, but China was accused of not honoring the treaty and led to the 1959 Tibetan uprising which was successfully suppressed by China, resulting in the Dalai Lama escaping to India.

Tibetans again rioted against other Chinese rule twice, in the 1987–1989 Tibetan unrest and 2008 unrest, where they directed their angers against Han and Hui Chinese. Both were suppressed by China and China has increased their military presence in the region, despite periodic self-immolations.

=== East Asia ===
==== Japan ====
After the end of the Second Sino-Japanese War and World War II in 1945, the relationship between China and Japan gradually improved. However, since 2000, Japan has seen a gradual resurgence of anti-Chinese sentiment. Many Japanese people believe that China is using the issue of the country's checkered history, such as the Japanese history textbook controversies, many war crimes which were committed by Japan's military, and official visits to the Yasukuni Shrine (in which a number of war criminals are enshrined), as both a diplomatic card and a tool to make Japan a scapegoat in domestic Chinese politics.

However, in postwar Japan, the anti-PRC was not necessarily the same as the anti-Chinese: anti-communists such as the Greater Japan Patriotic Party's Bin Akao supported the Chiang Kai-shek's plans and championed an anti-communist alliance between Japan and the Republic of China (ROC). Akao argued that the ROC should recruit Japanese volunteers to form an Anti-Communist Volunteer Army (反共義勇軍) to help Chiang in his efforts to reclaim the mainland.

The Anti-Japanese Riots in the Spring of 2005 were another source of more anger towards China among the Japanese public. Anti-Chinese sentiments have been on a sharp rise in Japan since 2002. According to the Pew Global Attitude Project (2008), 84% of Japanese people held an unfavorable view of China and 73% of Japanese people held an unfavorable view of Chinese people, which was a higher percentage than all the other countries surveyed.

==== South Korea ====
Anti-Chinese sentiment in Korea was created in the 21st century by cultural and historical claims of China and a sense of security crisis caused by China's economic growth. In the early 2000s, China's claim over the history of Goguryeo, an ancient Korean kingdom, caused tensions between both Koreas and China. The dispute has also involved naming controversies over Paektu Mountain (or Changbai Mountain in Chinese). China has been accused of trying to appropriate kimchi and hanbok as part of Chinese culture, along with labeling Yun Dong-ju as chaoxianzu, which have all angered South Koreans.

Anti-Chinese sentiments in South Korea have been on a steady rise since 2002. According to Pew opinion polls, favorable views of China steadily declined from 66% in 2002 to 48% in 2008, while unfavorable views rose from 31% in 2002 to 49% in 2008. According to surveys by the East Asia Institute, positive views of China's influence declined from 48.6% in 2005 to 38% in 2009, while negative views of it rose from 46.7% in 2005 to 50% in 2008. A 2012 BBC World Service poll had 64% of South Koreans expressing negative views of China's influence, which was the highest percentage out of 21 countries surveyed including Japan at 50%.

Relations further strained with the deployment of THAAD in South Korea in 2017, in which China started its boycott against Korea, making Koreans develop anti-Chinese sentiment in South Korea over reports of economic retaliation by Beijing. According to a poll from the Institute for Peace and Unification Studies at Seoul National University in 2018, 46% of South Koreans found China as the most threatening country to inter-Korean peace (compared to 33% for North Korea), marking the first time China was seen as a bigger threat than North Korea since the survey began in 2007. A 2022 poll from the Central European Institute of Asian Studies had 81% of South Koreans expressing a negative view of China, which was the highest out of 56 countries surveyed.

=== Central Asia ===
==== Kazakhstan ====
In 2018, massive land reform protests were held in Kazakhstan. The protesters demonstrated against the leasing of land to Chinese companies and the perceived economic dominance of Chinese companies and traders. Another issue which is leading to the rise of sinophobia in Kazakhstan is the Xinjiang conflict and Kazakhstan is responding to it by hosting a significant number of Uyghur separatists.

==== Kyrgyzstan ====
While discussing Chinese investments in the country, a Kyrgyz farmer said, "We always run the risk of being colonized by the Chinese".

Survey data cited by the Kennan Institute from 2017 to 2019 had on average 35% of Kyrgyz respondents expressing an unfavourable view of China compared to 52% expressing a favourable view; the disapproval rating was higher than that of respondents from 3 other Central Asian countries.

==== Tajikistan ====
Resentment against China and Chinese people has also increased in Tajikistan in recent years due to accusations that China has grabbed land from Tajikistan. In 2013, the Popular Tajik Social-Democrat Party leader, Rakhmatillo Zoirov, claimed that Chinese troops were violating a land-ceding arrangement by moving deeper into Tajikistan than they were supposed to.

=== Southeast Asia ===
==== Malaysia ====
Amidst the COVID-19 pandemic, there have been social media posts claiming the initial outbreak is "divine retribution" for China's treatment of its Muslim Uyghur population. According to a 2026 Pew Research Center poll, 75% of Malaysians saw China positively, while 25% saw it negatively.

==== Cambodia ====
The speed of Chinese resident arrivals in Sihanoukville city has led to an increase in fear and hostility towards the new influx of Chinese residents among the local population. As of 2018, the Chinese community in the city makes up almost 20% of the town's population.

==== Philippines ====
The standoff in Spratly Islands and Scarborough Shoal between China and the Philippines contributes to anti-China sentiment among Filipinos. Campaigns to boycott Chinese products began in 2012. People protested in front of the Chinese Embassy and it led the embassy to issue a travel warning for its citizens to the Philippines for a year.

Amidst the COVID-19 pandemic, scholar Jonathan Corpuz Ong has lamented that there is a great deal of hateful and racist speech on Philippine social media which "many academics and even journalists in the country have actually justified as a form of political resistance" to the Chinese government. Iisang Dagat, a song written by Chinese Ambassador to the Philippines Huang Xilian in an attempt to promote cooperation between the two countries during the pandemic, was poorly received due to perceptions of insincerity and malice. In addition, the United States government reinforced Filipinos' suspicion of China amidst the territorial disputes by conducting a disinformation campaign that amplified Filipinos' erosion of trust in Chinese COVID-19 vaccines and pandemic supplies.

In 2024, the Chinese-Filipino community in the Philippines expressed concerns over the increased anti-Chinese sentiment from Filipinos resulting from issues surrounding the POGO businesses and investigations on the background of Alice Guo, the dismissed mayor of Bamban accused by Filipino authorities of having connections with a POGO business in the said municipality.

According to a 2026 Pew Research Center poll, 40% of Filipinos saw China positively, while 57% saw it negatively.

==== Indonesia ====
In recent years, disputes in the South China Sea led to the renewal of tensions. At first, the conflict was contained between China and Vietnam, the Philippines and Malaysia, with Indonesia staying neutral. However, accusations about Indonesia's lack of activities to protect its fishermen from China's fishing vessels in the Natuna Sea and disinformation about Chinese foreign workers have contributed to the deterioration of China's image in Indonesia.

Coconuts Media reported in April 2022 of online groups in the country targeting Chinese-Indonesian women for racialised sexual abuse. On the other hand, a 2022 online poll done by Palacký University Olomouc had little more than 20% of Indonesian respondents viewing China negatively while over 70% held a positive view. According to a 2026 Pew Research Center poll, 72% of Indonesians saw China positively, while 28% saw it negatively.

==== Myanmar ====
The ongoing ethnic insurgency in Myanmar and the 1967 riots in Burma against the Chinese community displeased the PRC, which led to the arming of ethnic and political rebels by China against Burma. Resentment towards Chinese investments and their perceived exploitation of natural resources have also hampered the Sino-Burmese relationship.

In November 2023, pro junta supporters held protests in Naypyidaw and Yangon accusing China of supporting Operation 1027 rebels, with some Yangon protesters threatening to attack China for its support.

==== Vietnam ====
The two countries' shared history includes territorial disputes, with conflict over the Paracel and Spratly Islands reaching a peak between 1979 and 1991.

Anti-Chinese sentiments had spiked in 2007 after China formed an administration in the disputed islands, in 2009 when the Vietnamese government allowed the Chinese aluminium manufacturer Chinalco the rights to mine for bauxite in the Central Highlands, and when Vietnamese fishermen were detained by Chinese security forces while seeking refuge in the disputed territories. In 2011, following a spat in which a Chinese Marine Surveillance ship damaged a Vietnamese geologic survey ship off the coast of Vietnam, some Vietnamese travel agencies boycotted Chinese destinations or refused to serve customers with Chinese citizenship. Hundreds of people protested in front of the Chinese embassy in Hanoi and the Chinese consulate in Ho Chi Minh City against Chinese naval operations in the South China Sea before being dispersed by the police. In May 2014, mass anti-Chinese protests against China moving an oil platform into disputed waters escalated into riots in which many Chinese factories and workers were targeted. In 2018, thousands of people nationwide protested against a proposed law regarding Special Economic Zones that would give foreign investors 99-year leases on Vietnamese land, fearing that it would be dominated by Chinese investors.

According to journalist Daniel Gross, anti-Chinese sentiment is omnipresent in modern Vietnam, where "from school kids to government officials, China-bashing is very much in vogue." He reports that a majority of Vietnamese resent the import and usage of Chinese products, considering them of distinctly low status. A 2013 book on varying host perceptions in global tourism has also referenced negativity from Vietnamese hosts towards Chinese tourists, where the latter were seen as "making a lot more requests, complaints and troubles than other tourists"; the views differed from the much more positive perceptions of young Tibetan hosts at Lhasa towards mainland Chinese visitors in 2011.

According to research on contemporary Vietnamese nationalism by Nhi Hoang Thuc Nguyen, Sinophobia is framed as a "recurring pattern, an essentialist historic sentiment which many Vietnamese construct their identity upon", and "commonly accepted as a natural consequence of the past tension and present lingering political conflicts between the two countries". Nguyen argued that in contemporary Vietnam, animosity towards the Chinese state is often used interchangeably with animosity towards Chinese people and culture, and Chinese people and businesses are often subject to derogatory stereotypes such as "uncivil", "cheap", and "exploitative", all of which are seen in the wider context of perceived attempts by the Chinese to forcibly assimilate Vietnam. Thus according to Nguyen, "the necessity to protect national identity was on par with the complete rejection of Chinese influences."

In 2019, Chinese media was accused by the local press of appropriating or claiming Áo dài, which angered many Vietnamese.

=== South Asia ===
==== Afghanistan ====
According to The Diplomat in 2014, the Xinjiang conflict had increased anti-China sentiment in Afghanistan. A 2020 Gallup International poll of 44 countries found that 46% of Afghans viewed China's foreign policy as destabilizing to the world, compared to 48% who viewed it as stabilizing.

==== Bhutan ====
The relationship between Bhutan and China has historically been tense and past events have led to anti-Chinese sentiment within the country. Notably, the Chinese government's destruction of Tibetan Buddhist institutions in Tibet in 1959 led to a wave of anti-Chinese sentiment in the country. In 1960, the PRC published a map in A Brief History of China, depicting a sizable portion of Bhutan as "a pre-historical realm of China" and released a statement claiming the Bhutanese "form a united family in Tibet" and "they must once again be united and taught the communist doctrine". Bhutan responded by closing off its border, trade, and all diplomatic contacts with China. Bhutan and China have not established diplomatic relations. Recent efforts between the two countries to improve relations have been hampered by India's strong influence on Bhutan.

==== India ====
On 2014, India in conjunction with the Tibetan government-in-exile have called for a campaign to boycott Chinese goods due in part to the contested border disputes India has with China.

The 2020 China–India skirmishes resulted in the deaths 20 Indian soldiers and an undisclosed number of Chinese soldiers, in hand-to-hand combat using improvised weapons.

Following the skirmishes, a company from Jaipur, India developed an app named "Remove China Apps" and released it on the Google Play Store, gaining 5 million downloads in less than two weeks. It discouraged software dependence on China and promoted apps developed in India. Afterwards, people began uninstalling Chinese apps like SHAREit and CamScanner.

==== Nepal ====
Chinese outlet CGTN published a tweet about Mount Everest, calling it Mount Qomolangma in the Tibetan language and saying it was located in China's Tibet Autonomous Region, which caused displeasure from Nepalese and Indian Twitter users, who tweeted that China is trying to claim the mount from Nepal.

==== Sri Lanka ====
There were protests against allowing China to build a port and industrial zone, which will require the eviction of thousands of villagers around Hambantota. Projects on the Hambantota port have led to fears among the local protestors that the area will become a "Chinese colony". Armed government supporters clashed with protestors from the opposition that were led by Buddhist monks.

Views of China in Sri Lanka are positive; according to a 2026 Pew Research Center poll, 72% of Sri Lankans look at China positively, while only 11% look at it negatively.

=== Western Asia ===
==== Israel ====
Israel and China have a stable relationship, and a 2018 survey suggested that a significant percentage of the Israeli population have a positive view of Chinese culture and people. This is historically preceded by Chinese support for Jewish refugees fleeing from Europe amidst World War II. Within China, Jews gained praise for their successful integration, with a number of Jewish refugees advising Mao's government and leading developments in revolutionary China's health service and infrastructure.

However, these close relations between the early Chinese Communist Party (CCP) and the small Jewish-Chinese community have been hampered in recent years under the administration of CCP general secretary Xi Jinping and rise of nationalist sentiment in China, with Jews monitored since 2016, an occurrence reported widely in Israeli media.

==== Turkey ====
On July 4, 2015, a group of around 2,000 Turkish ultra-nationalists from the Grey Wolves linked to Turkey's MHP (Nationalist Movement Party) protesting against China's Ramadan fasting ban in Xinjiang mistakenly attacked South Korean tourists in Istanbul, which led to China issuing a travel warning to its citizens traveling to Turkey. Devlet Bahçeli, a leader from MHP, said that the attacks by MHP affiliated Turkish youth on South Korean tourists was "understandable", telling the Turkish newspaper Hürriyet that: "What feature differentiates a Korean from a Chinese? They see that they both have slanted eyes. How can they tell the difference?".

A Uyghur employee at a Chinese restaurant was attacked in 2015 by the Turkish Grey Wolves-linked protesters. Attacks on other Chinese nationals have been reported.

According to a November 2018 INR poll, 46% of Turks view China favourably, up from less than 20% in 2015. A further 62% thought that it is important to have a strong trade relationship with China.

=== Europe ===
==== Czech Republic ====
Anti-Chinese sentiment has experienced a new growth due to closer ties between the Czech Republic and Taiwan and led to a deterioration of the Czech Republic's relations with China. Czech politicians have demanded China to replace its ambassador and criticizing the Chinese government for its alleged threats against the Czech Republic, further worsening China's perception in the country.

==== France ====
French farmers protested after a Chinese investor purchased 2,700 hectares of agricultural land in France. A 2018 survey by Institut Montaigne has suggested that Chinese investments in France are viewed more negatively than Chinese tourism to the country, with 50% of respondents holding negative views of the former. 43% of the French see China as an economic threat, an opinion that is common among older and right-wing people, and 40% of French people view China as a technological threat.

It was reported in 2017 that there was some negativity among Parisians towards Chinese visitors, but other surveys have suggested that they are not viewed worse than a number of other groups.

==== Germany ====
Two surveys have suggested that a percentage of Germans hold negative views towards Chinese travellers, although it is not as bad as a few other groups.

==== Italy ====
In 2010, in the Italian town of Prato, it was reported that many Chinese people were working in sweatshop-like conditions that broke European laws and that many Chinese-owned businesses don't pay taxes. Textile products produced by Chinese-owned businesses in Italy are labeled as 'Made in Italy', but some of the businesses engaged in practices that reduce cost and increase output to the point where locally owned businesses can't compete with. As a result of these practices, the 2009 municipal elections led the local population to vote for the Lega Nord, a party known for its anti-immigrant stance.

==== Russia ====
After the Sino-Soviet split the Soviet Union produced propaganda which depicted the PRC and the Chinese people as enemies. Soviet propaganda specifically framed the PRC as an enemy of Islam and all Turkic peoples. These phobias have been inherited by the post-Soviet states in Central Asia.

Although Russia had inherited a long-standing dispute over territory with China over Siberia and the Russian Far East with the breakup of the Soviet Union, these disputes were formerly resolved in 2004. Russia and China no longer have territorial disputes and China does not claim land in Russia; however, there has also been a perceived fear of a demographic takeover by Chinese immigrants in sparsely populated Russian areas. Both nations have become increasingly friendlier however, in the aftermath of the 1999 US bombing of Serbia, which the Chinese embassy was struck with a bomb, and have become increasingly united in foreign policy regarding perceived Western antipathy.

A 2019 survey of online Russians has suggested that in terms of sincerity, trustfulness, and warmth, the Chinese are not viewed especially negatively or positively compared to the many other nationalities and ethnic groups in the study. An October 2020 poll from the Central European Institute of Asian Studies found that although China was perceived positively by 59.5% of Russian respondents (which was higher than for the other 11 regions asked), 57% of respondents regarded Chinese enterprises in the Russian far east to varying degrees as a threat to the local environment.

==== Spain ====
A Central European Institute of Asian Studies poll in 2020 found that although Spaniards had worsening views of China amidst the COVID-19 pandemic, it did not apply to Chinese citizens where most respondents reported positive views of Chinese tourists, students, and the general community in Spain. Views of China improved by the mid-2020s; according to a 2026 Pew Research Center poll, 54% of Spaniards saw China positively.

==== Sweden ====
In 2018, a family of Chinese tourists was removed from a hostel in Stockholm, which led to a diplomatic spat between China and Sweden. China accused the Swedish police of maltreatment as Stockholm's chief prosecutor chose not to investigate the incident. A comedy skit later aired on Svenska Nyheter mocking the tourists and playing on racial stereotypes of Chinese people. After the producers uploaded the skit to Youku, it drew anger and accusations of racism on Chinese social media, the latter of which was also echoed in a letter to the editor from a Swedish-Chinese scholar to Dagens Nyheter. Chinese citizens were called on to boycott Sweden. The next year, Jesper Rönndahl, the host of the skit, was honoured by Swedish newspaper Kvällsposten as "Scanian of the Year".

Relations further worsened after the reported kidnap and arrest of China-born Swedish citizen and bookseller Gui Minhai by Chinese authorities, which led to three Swedish opposition parties calling for the expulsion of China's ambassador to Sweden, Gui Congyou, who had been accused of threatening several Swedish media outlets. Several Swedish cities cut ties with China's cities in February 2020 amid deteriorating relations. In May 2020, Sweden decided to shut down all Confucius Institutes in the country, citing the Chinese government's meddling in education affairs. Some Chinese in Sweden have also reported increased stigmatisation during the COVID-19 pandemic. A 2021 YouGov poll had 77% of Swedish respondents expressing an unfavourable view of China, with no other country more negatively viewed in Sweden except for Iran and Saudi Arabia.

==== Ukraine ====
During the Russian invasion of Ukraine, the pro-Russian Chinese government media stance along with reports of chauvinistic comments about Ukrainian women and pro-Russian sentiment by some Chinese netizens led to the fueling of anti-Chinese sentiment in Ukraine. In response, the Embassy of China in Kyiv, which originally encouraged citizens to display Chinese flags on their cars for protection while leaving Ukraine, quickly urged them not to identify themselves or sport any signs of national identity. In a 2023 Razumkov Centre opinion poll 60% of Ukrainians had a negative view of China - up from 14% in 2019.

=== Americas ===
==== Argentina ====
Since the 1990s there has been a large wave of immigration of Chinese citizens, mainly from Fujian province. The main business in which the Chinese are dedicated in Argentina is grocery stores and on several occasions they have been accused of unplugging the refrigerators of fresh products during the night to pay cheaper electricity bills. During the social outbreak of 2001, derived from the economic crisis of that year in Argentina, several Chinese-owned supermarkets were attacked.

==== Brazil ====
Chinese investments in Brazil have been largely influenced by this negative impression.

==== Canada ====
Anti-Chinese sentiment in Canada has been fueled by allegations of extreme real estate price distortion resulting from Chinese demand, purportedly forcing locals out of the market.

==== United States ====
In the 2010 United States elections, a significant number of negative advertisements from both major political parties focused on a candidates' alleged support for free trade with China which were criticized by Jeff Yang for promoting anti-Chinese xenophobia. Some of the stock images that accompanied ominous voiceovers about China were actually of Chinatown, San Francisco. These advertisements included one produced by Citizens Against Government Waste called "Chinese Professor", which portrayed a 2030 conquest of the West by China and an ad by Congressman Zack Space attacking his opponent for supporting free trade agreements like NAFTA, which the ad had claimed caused jobs to be outsourced to China.

In October 2013, a child actor on Jimmy Kimmel Live! jokingly suggested in a skit that the U.S. could solve its debt problems by "kill[ing] everyone in China."

Donald Trump, the 45th President of the United States, was accused of promoting sinophobia throughout his campaign for the Presidency in 2016. and it was followed by his imposition of trade tariffs on Chinese goods, which was seen as a declaration of a trade war and another anti-Chinese act. The deterioration of relations has led to a spike in anti-Chinese sentiment in the US.

According to a Pew Research Center poll which was conducted in April 2022, 82% of Americans have unfavorable opinions of China, including 40% who have very unfavorable views of the country. In recent years, however, Americans increasingly see China as a competitor, not as an enemy. 62% view China as a competitor and 25% an enemy, with 10% seeing China as a partner. In January 2022, only 54% chose competitor and 35% said enemy, almost the same distribution as the prior year.

It has been noted that there is a negative bias in American reporting on China. Many Americans, including American-born Chinese, have continuously held prejudices toward mainland Chinese people which include perceived rudeness and unwillingness to stand in line, even though there are sources that have reported contrary to those stereotypes. However, the results of a survey which was conducted in 2019 have revealed that some Americans still hold positive views of Chinese visitors to the US.

A Pew Research poll which was conducted in the US in March 2021 revealed that 55% of respondents supported the imposition of limits on the number of Chinese students who are allowed to study in the country.

In recent years, there has been an increase in the number of laws which explicitly discriminate against Chinese people in the United States. For example, in 2023, Florida introduced a law which bans Chinese nationals from owning property in the state, a law that has been compared to the Chinese Exclusion Act of 1882.

===== Intelligence activities =====
The United States has often accused the People's Republic of China (PRC) of unlawfully acquiring US military technology, classified information, personnel data, and trade secrets of US companies in order to support China's long-term military and commercial development. Alleged perpetrators include Chinese government agencies, affiliated personnel, civilian-in-name companies and their network of academic or business contacts.

=== Africa ===
Anti-Chinese populism has been an emerging presence in some African countries. There have been reported incidents of Chinese workers and business-owners being attacked by locals in some parts of the continent. Following reports of evictions, discrimination and other mistreatment of Africans in Guangzhou during the COVID-19 pandemic, a group of diplomats from different African countries wrote a letter to express their displeasure over the treatment of their citizens. Nevertheless, public opinion polls show that African countries generally have overwhelmingly positive opinions of China.

==== Angola ====
Following the July 2025 Angolan protests, dozens of Chinese-owned retail shops were looted and thousands of Chinese nationals fled the country.

==== Botswana ====
A study of print media in Botswana indicates that most of the anti-Chinese sentiment is tied to commerce. Chinese migrants have been accused of selling counterfeit products, participating in the illegal ivory trade, and taking advantage of loopholes to set up illegal businesses. Tensions have also risen due to large construction projects with reports of poor construction, project delays, and Chinese contractors bribing local officials to receive preferential contracts and treatment. Chinese migrants have also been accused of not integrating into local society, refusing to speak in English or Setswana, and treating Botswanan workers poorly.

Lawmakers in Botswana have also expressed complaints about Chinese nationals in the country. MP Akayang Magama claimed that Chinese firms avoid paying their employees benefits, bribe labor officials and "treat their employees like slaves." Another MP, Robert Molefhabangwe referenced the "unwelcoming behavior by some Chinese nationals," and claimed that the Chinese contractors "maybe ... are sent to our country because they are a political embarrassment and a nuisance of some sort." While both of these lawmakers are referencing state-owned firms, they are taking issue with the actions of individual Chinese nationals, not the PRC.

==== Namibia ====
Anti-Chinese sentiment has erupted due to large Chinese companies involvement in the mining industry and the increase in independent traders. Protests have happened over anger about the employment of Chinese workers rather than Namibian workers, bad payment, and poor working conditions. The success of Chinese construction companies in winning contracts over Namibian firms has created resentment which is made worse by accusations of poor workplace conditions.

In Oshikango, Namibia, a town on the Namibia-Angola border, the recent arrival of Chinese migrants have stoked anti-Chinese sentiments. Most set up shops to sell and import Chinese products, which have increasingly been seen as cheap products meant to cheat local Namibians. Those who have expanded into other industries have also faced backlash, with the Namibian construction industry lobbying heavily against Chinese companies. Previously, Chinese traders were able to maintain a positive relationship with customs officials, but the rising anti-Chinese in Namibia has made customs officials less likely to turn a blind eye to illegal business practices they ignored before. It has also led to an association between the Chinese and bribery of government officials.

Dislike of Chinese traders has also led to changes in immigration policies. Before 2005, Chinese people appeared to have an easier time obtaining papers than other immigrants, but it has since become very difficult to obtain the correct papers. The government also issues very few work permits for foreign shopkeepers. Finally, in Oshikango, the sale of a large tract of land to build a Chinatown in 2006 stoked anti-Chinese sentiment. Locals accused the town council of selling the best land to foreigners. While xenophobia, these accusations were also factually incorrect, as much of the land was bought from individuals.

==== South Africa ====
In 2016, the South African government planned to offer Mandarin as an additional optional language along with German, Serbian, Italian, Latin, Portuguese, Spanish, Tamil, Telugu and Urdu. However, the teachers union in South Africa accused the government of surrendering to Chinese imperialism. As of 2017, there were 53 schools that offered Mandarin in the country.

==== Zimbabwe ====
Zimbabwe's historical positive relationship with China has eroded with the new wave of immigrants, who are largely profit-driven and make up the largest portion of the current Chinese diaspora in Zimbabwe. The historical narrative, of cooperation between members of the Global South and of "all-weather friends" has broken down past the era of Maoism.

Chinese migrants are often associated with being abusive, low wage employers and extensive local corruption. There have been a number of reported cases of abuse that were thrown out due to local officials receiving bribes. In addition, some Chinese nationals have attempted to illegally move money across borders, either through trading foreign currency through informal markets, or trying to externalize massive quantities of cash. The lack of compliance with local law has soured relations between local Zimbabweans, and their general impressions of Chinese as a whole.

In addition, the flooding of the Zimbabwean market of cheap Chinese goods has also led to the impression of all Chinese goods being cheap, and at times, the Chinese traders being scammers who provide deficient products. The derogatory transliteration of the Chinese term "Zheng Zhong" (正宗) to "Zhing Zhong" is commonly used by locals to refer to products as cheap and having a short lifespan. The high number of Chinese goods, especially in textiles, has also informed the ways Zimbabweans perceive all Chinese factories. In Harare, ten Chinese owned textile mills, despite being largely staffed by locals, was forced to shut down due to fears of Chinese goods unfairly driving down local prices.

== Depiction of China and Chinese in media ==
Depictions of China and Chinese in Anglophone media have been a somewhat underreported subject in general, but most are mainly negative coverage. In 2016, Hong Kong's L. K. Cheah said to South China Morning Post that Western journalists who regard China's motives with suspicion and cynicism cherry-pick facts based on a biased view, and the misinformation that they produce as a result is unhelpful and sympathetic of the resentment against China.

According to China Daily, a nationalist daily newspaper in China, Hollywood is accused of negative portrayals of Chinese in movies, such as bandits, thugs, criminals, gangsters, dangerous, cold-blooded, weak, and cruel; while American, as well as European, or Asian characters in general, are depicted as saviors. Matt Damon, the American actor who appeared in The Great Wall, has also faced criticism that he had participated in "whitewashing" through his involvement in the historical epic and Hollywood-Chinese co-produced movie, which he denied.

Some sources critical of the Chinese government claim that it is Chinese state-owned media and administration who attempt to discredit the "neutral" criticism by generalizing it into indiscriminate accusations of the whole Chinese population, and targeting those who criticize the regime as sinophobic. Some have argued, however, that the Western media, similar to Russia's depictions, does not make enough distinction between CPC's regime and China and the Chinese, thus effectively vilifying the whole nation.

== Impact on Chinese student populations ==
On occasion, Chinese students in the West are stereotyped as lacking in critical thinking skills and prone to plagiarism, or as harming the educational environment.

== Derogatory terms ==
- Ah Tiong (阿中) – refers specifically to Chinese nationals. Primarily used in Singapore to differentiate between the Singaporeans of Chinese heritage and Chinese nationals. From Hokkien 中, an abbreviation of 中國 ("China"). Considered offensive.
- Cheena – derogatory term for China and mainland Chinese people in Hong Kong, same usage as 'Eh Tiong' in Singapore. Compare Shina (支那).
- Chicom – used to refer to a Communist Chinese.
- Chinazi – a recent anti-Chinese sentiment which compares China to Nazi Germany, combining the words "China" and "Nazi". First published by Chinese dissident Yu Jie, it became frequently used during Hong Kong protests against the Chinese government.
- Communist bandit – anti-communist epithet directed at members of the Chinese Communist Party.
- Gaat zaat (Chinese: 曱甴; Jyutping: gaat^{6}zaat^{6}) – literally "cockroach"; derogatory neologism used to refer to Hong Kong protestors accused of bad behavior.
- Locust (Chinese: 蝗蟲; Jyutping: wong^{4}cung^{4}) – literally "locust"; derogatory neologism used to refer to mainland visitors to Hong Kong accused of bad behavior.
- Made in China – used to mock low-quality products, even to dismiss high-quality products that happen to be made in China. Term can extend to other pejoratively perceived aspects of the country.
- Si-a-liok (Chinese: 死阿陸; Pe̍h-ōe-jī: Sí-a-lio̍k / Sí-a-la̍k) – literally "damn mainlander", sometimes uses "四二六" (426, sì èr liù) in Mandarin as word play. See also: 阿陸仔.
- Wumao (五毛) – used in online communities to accuse users of being government-sponsored propagandists, referring to the 50 Cent Party.

=== Brazil ===
- Xing ling (星零) – To name a rip-off product, associated with Chinese products.

=== Indonesia ===
- Cina PKI Kafir Komunis Laknatullah (God-damned Chinese Communist Infidel) – Refers to non-Muslim Chinese people who are often called communist supporters of the PRC. This term has been used as a joke since the incident of blasphemy against Islam by the governor of Jakarta, who is of Chinese descent.

=== Japan ===
- Tokuajin (特亜人) – literally "particular Asian people", term used for people from East Asian countries that have anti-Japanese sentiments. Taken from Tokutei Asia (特定アジア) which is a term used for countries that are considered anti-Japanese and have political tensions and disputes with Japan, namely North Korea, South Korea, and China.

=== Korea ===
- Jung-gong (Korean: 중공; Hanja: 中共) – literally "Chinese communist", it is generally used to refer to Chinese communists, since the Korean War (1950–1953).

=== Vietnam ===
- Ếch Trung Hoa (lit. 'Frog Chinese') – Derogatory slur from Vietnamese towards Chinese people meaning "frog" due to common sentiments regarding Chinese as ignorant and obnoxious due to Chinese internet censorship.
- Tung Của / Trung Của / Trung Cẩu (lit. 'Dog Chinese') – a word that imitates the pronunciation of Mandarin Chinese Zhōngguó "中国" (China) in a mocking manner, but rarely used.
- Trung Cộng or Tàu Cộng (lit. 'Chinese communists or Communist China') – used by Vietnamese anti-communists, mostly in exile, as a mockery toward China's political system and its imperialist desires.

== Response ==
=== Chinese response ===
In the aftermath of the United States bombing of the Chinese embassy in Belgrade during the NATO bombing of Yugoslavia in 1999, there was a significant surge in Chinese nationalist sentiment, and it was intensified by the growth of patriotic movements in China, which, like patriotic movements in Russia, believe that China is engaged in a clash of civilizations or a "a global struggle between the materialistic, individualistic, consumerist, cosmopolitan, corrupt, and decadent West which is led by the United States and the idealist, collectivist, morally and spiritually superior Asia which is led by China," where the West is viewed as trying to tear China up so it can use its natural resources to satisfy its own interests and needs.

A 2020 study among Chinese students who were studying abroad in the United States found that after they faced anti-Chinese racism, their support for the Chinese government increased. A similar phenomenon was also reported for many Chinese students in the UK.

==== Wolf warrior diplomacy ====
Wolf warrior diplomacy is a confrontational form of public diplomacy adopted by diplomats of the People's Republic of China in the late 2010s and early 2020s. The phrase is derived from the Chinese action film franchise Wolf Warrior (2015) and its 2017 sequel. Analysts have characterized this style of diplomacy as coercive, and in contrast both to the narrative of "China's peaceful rise" and to diplomatic practices which emphasize the use of cooperative rhetoric and the avoidance of controversy (often termed Taoguang Yanghui), financial aid (checkbook diplomacy), the provision of medical supplies such as COVID-19 masks (medical diplomacy), and panda diplomacy.

=== Others ===
In February and March 2024, Malaysian PM Anwar Ibrahim criticised the growing 'China-phobia' sentiment in Western nations, insisting that Malaysia can be friends with both China and the West. China's embassy minister expressed appreciation for Anwar's comments, adding that Malaysia was a friendly neighbour and a priority in China's neighbourhood diplomacy.

== See also ==
- Anti-Chinese sentiment
- Anti-communism in China
- Blue Team (U.S. politics)
- Boycotts of Chinese products
- China threat theory
- Pro–Republic of China sentiment
