= Counterattack the mainland =

Political slogan of Taiwan

"Counterattack the mainland" (反攻大陸), "recover the mainland" (光復大陸) or "oppose communism and revitalize the nation" (反共復國) was the military action and political advocacy of the government of the Republic of China (ROC) from the time of its relocation to Taiwan in 1949 until the 1990s, which referred to the counterattack on the mainland China, which was under the rule of the Chinese Communist Party (CPC) after the Second Chinese Civil War. When Chiang Kai-shek and Yen Chia-kan were presidents of ROC, counter-attacking the mainland was one of the most important national policies of the ROC in Taiwan, and the enthusiasm for counter-attacking the mainland gradually faded after the 1970s due to the changes in the cross-strait situation and the international situation, as well as the reality of the power balance between the two sides of the Taiwan Strait.

== See also ==
- Communist bandit
- Project National Glory
- "Go and Reclaim the Mainland" (反攻大陸去)
- "Fighting Communism and Rebuilding the Nation Song" (反共復國歌)
