= Hanjian =

Traitor to the Han Chinese state

- Traditional Chinese: 漢奸
- Simplified Chinese: 汉奸
- Literal meaning: Han traitor
Transcriptions
Standard Mandarin
- Hanyu Pinyin: Hànjiān
- Wade–Giles: Han^{4}-chien^{1}
Yue: Cantonese
- Jyutping: Hon3 Gaan1
Southern Min
- Hokkien POJ: Hàn-kan

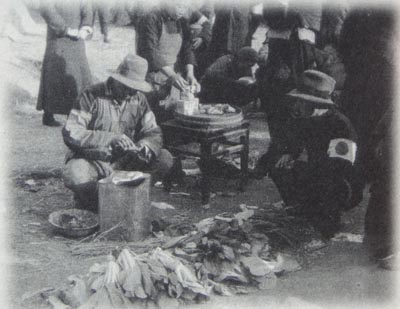
Nanking residents with armbands of the Japanese flag

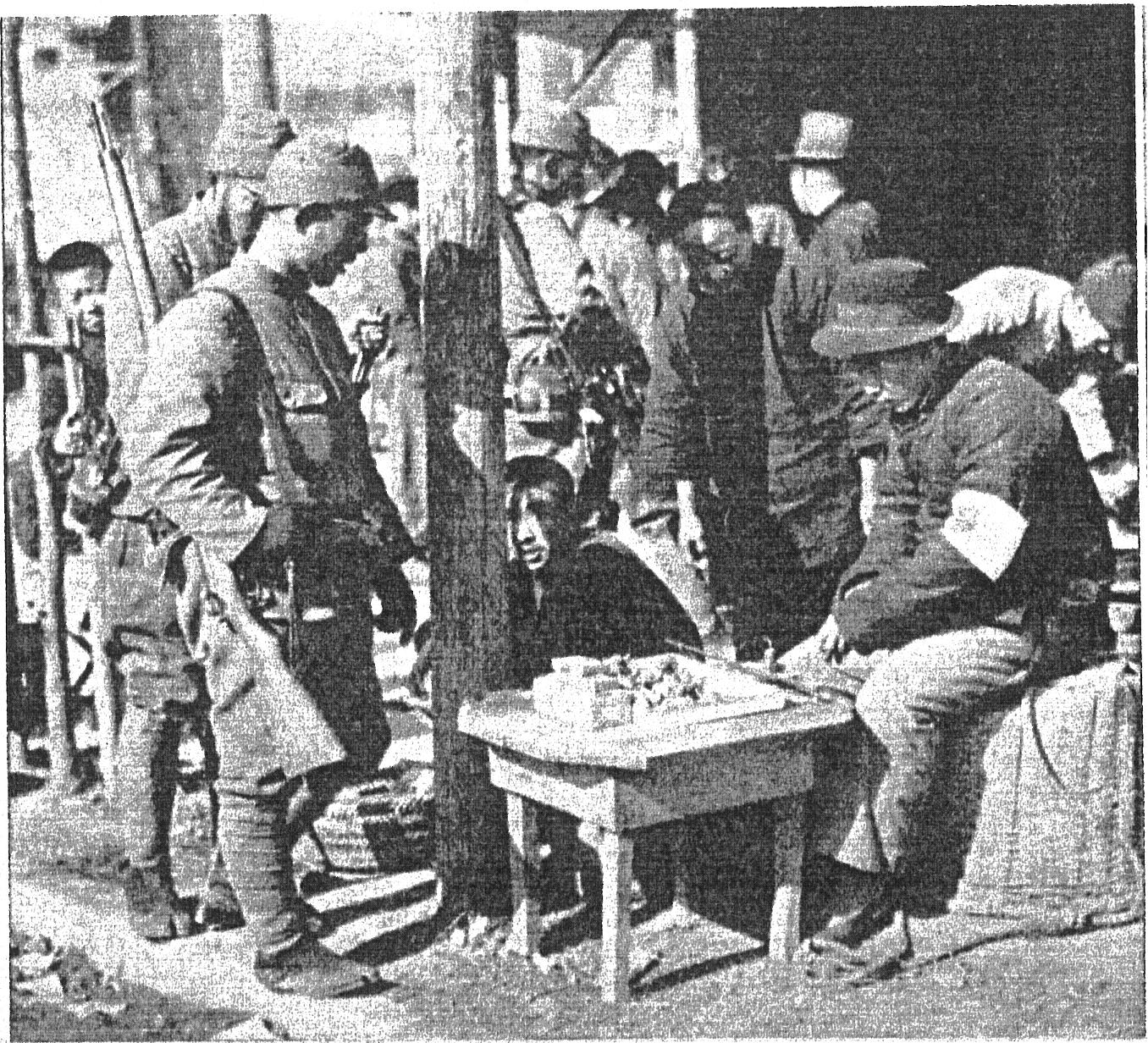
Chinese civilians assisting Japanese soldiers

In China, the word hanjian (traditional Chinese: 漢奸; simplified Chinese: 汉奸; pinyin: Hànjiān; Wade–Giles: han⁴-chien¹) is a pejorative term for those seen as traitors to the Chinese state and, to a lesser extent, Han Chinese ethnicity. The word hanjian is distinct from the general word for traitor, which could be used for any country or ethnicity. As a Chinese term, it is composed of the Chinese characters for "Han" and "traitor". In Chinese legal language, it could also refer to illicit sexual relations; implied by this term was a Han Chinese carrying on an illicit relationship with the enemy. Hanjian is often worded as "collaborator" or "collaborationist" in the West.

== History ==
=== Ming dynasty ===
The term hanjian first appeared during the Ming dynasty's suppression of the rebellion of the Tusi in the southwest. From 1621 to 1630, a Tusi rebellion broke out in the southwest, affecting Sichuan, Guizhou, Yunnan, and Guangxi provinces, historically known as the She–An Rebellion. During the aftermath and governance of Mu'ege, Yang Sichang and Zhu Xieyuan, two ministers of the Ministry of War both used the term hanjian in their memorials, referring to Han Chinese who colluded with the southwestern Yi people in the rebellion.

Yang Sichang's "Memorial on the Aftermath of the Disaster in Mu'ege" states: "The previous situation shows that this remote and desolate place, untouched by the emperor's teachings, is prone to unrest and difficult to pacify. Given this inherent nature, if hanjian were to instigate it, the Yi people would immediately riot like startled deer and boars, creating immediate chaos."

Zhu Xieyuan's "Memorial on the Distant Land of Yi and Han Peoples in Mu'ege" The memorial regarding the handling of the situation states: "The land of the barbarians is treacherous, with narrow, winding paths; their nature is like that of dogs and sheep, changing several times a day; if instigated by hanjian, their cunning will be unleashed, making military intervention necessary".

Zuo Zhuan and Guoyu, among other classics, define "internal chaos as treachery, external chaos as treachery." Therefore, the term hanjian initially referred to those who, using their perceived superiority as Han Chinese, indirectly aided the barbarians in their resistance against the Ming dynasty.

=== Qing dynasty ===
The Qing court initially used the term hanjian to refer to Han Chinese who incited and manipulated the Yi people in the southwestern border regions to rebel against the court. During the Kangxi era, the Guizhou governor Tian Wen wrote in Guhuantang Collection: Qian Shu: "The Miao banditry problem arose from hanjian. Some instigated and instructed them from within, while others patched up the gaps from without. Once their support was established, their courage and arrogance grew, and they became uncontrollable." The Yongzheng Emperor used the term hanjian multiple times.

During the reign of the Qianlong Emperor, in addition to continuing the meaning from the Yongzheng era, the term acquired two additional layers of meaning: first, Han people who illegally seized the property of non-Han (Yi) peoples and bullied and extorted them; second, Chinese people who assisted vassal states in harming China's interests, including both Han people and ethnic minorities from the border regions. Thus, during the Qianlong era, the term hanjian was no longer limited to referring to Han people, but also referred to non-Han peoples who harmed national interests.

During the reign of the Daoguang Emperor, records like the following could be found when the Western powers were at war with the Qing dynasty in the First Opium War: "You hanjian, causing trouble among yourselves." "Using our own people as hanjian is beyond your dog's ability." "The hanjian you employ are all lawbreakers of our Celestial Dynasty, some who have committed murder and fled, others who have manipulated documents and engaged in corruption. They are utterly incompetent and are those whom the Celestial Dynasty has rejected. Yet you have made good use of them." During the Boxer Rebellion, the term "hanjian Christians" was used to refer to the Christians involved. Yuan Chang, Xu Jingcheng, and Xu Yongyi were labeled as hanjian and were executed by Empress Dowager Cixi's faction. Lian Yuan, a Manchu Grand Secretary, and Li Shan, a Mongol Minister of Revenue, were also branded as hanjian and executed.

During the 1911 Revolution, in contrast to the Qing government's designation of the term, the revolutionary party's anti-Manchu propaganda gave rise to a new meaning of the term, referring to Han Chinese who acted as accomplices to the Manchus and harmed their fellow Han people as hanjian.

=== 20th century and the Second Sino-Japanese War ===
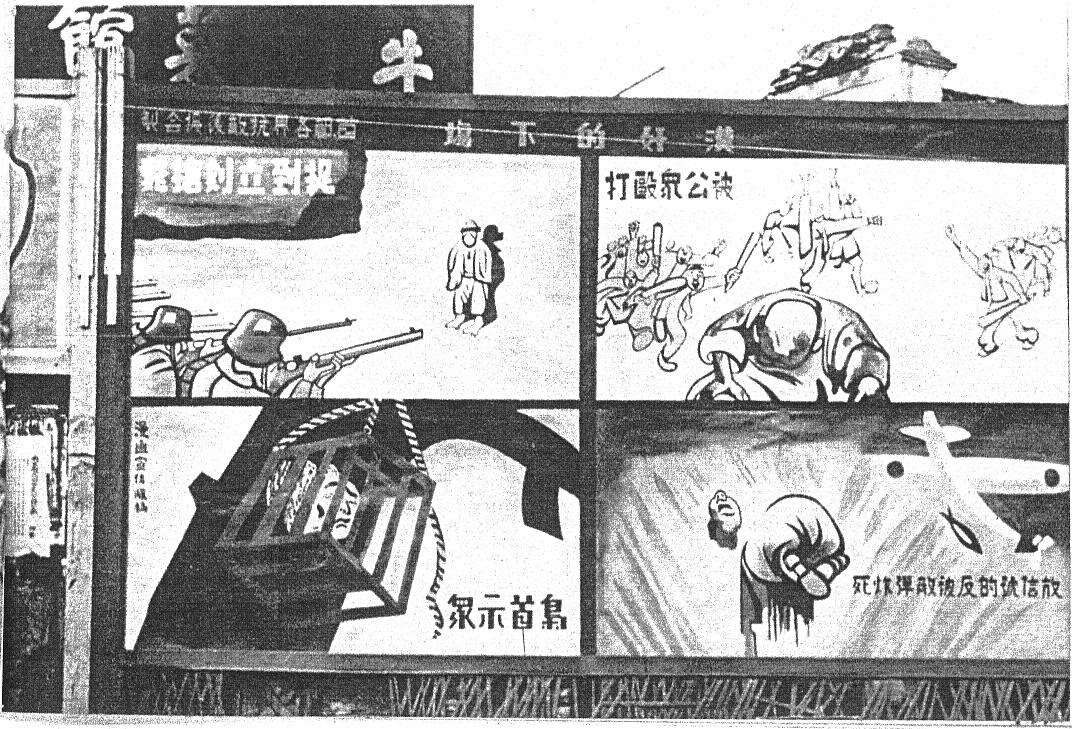
A Chinese propaganda poster titled "Fate of Hanjians", published by the Capital City Resistance War Supporters Association of All Citizens, was posted throughout Nanjing soon after the Battle of Nanking. Clockwise from top right: a hanjian being beaten by a mob; a hanjian who sends a signal to enemy aircraft will die in an air raid; the severed head of a hanjian put on display as a warning to others; a hanjian will be arrested and shot.

Later, the term hanjian was evolved to mean "conflation of political and ethnic identities, which was often blurred in the expression of Chinese nationalism." It is a label applied to individuals who are designated collaborators and by which were not all ethnically Han. The modern usage of the term stems from the Second Sino-Japanese War in which circumstances forced political figures in China to choose between resistance and collaboration. The nuance in understanding why Chinese individuals would decide to cooperate with the Japanese obscures the seemingly clear-cut definition of hanjian, evolving it into an ambiguous term in modern history.

When observing the era of the Sino-Japanese War, there tends to be two types of hanjian: the educated and intellectuals, who "simply wanted to get power and wealth for themselves"; and the poor and uneducated, whose poverty drove them to collaborate and whose "ignorance saved them from even thinking they had to justify what they were doing". Due to this notion and the modern ambiguity of the term, each of these two categories had various motives with the majority being different but some overlapping.

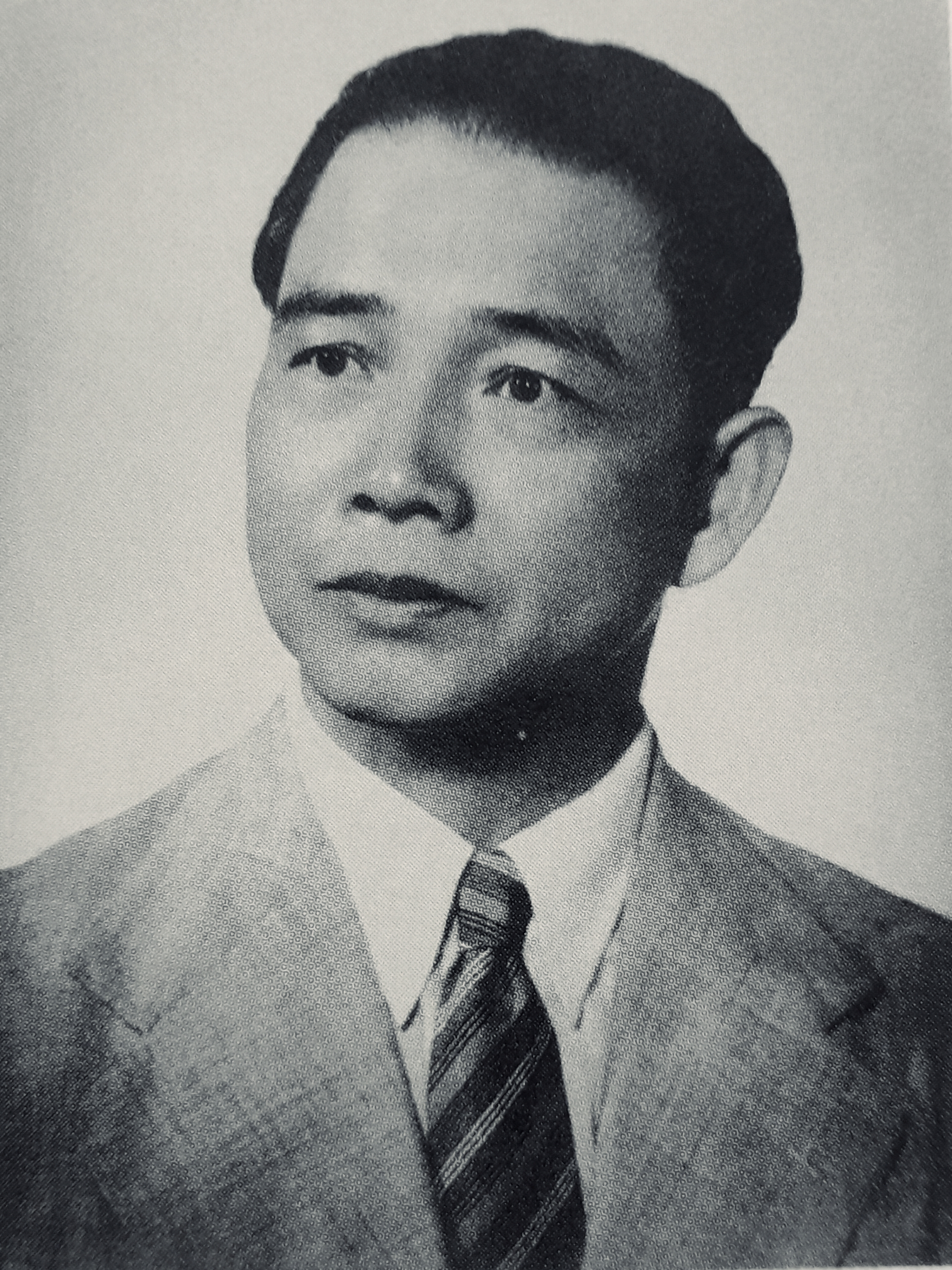
A portrait of Wang Jingwei

Educated hanjian is often reserved for those who were either scholars or within government. The most infamous hanjian government in mainland China is the Reorganized National Government of the Republic of China, often referred to as the Wang Jingwei regime after Wang Jingwei, its president. The Wang Jingwei regime sought to be the dominant governmental force in China and believed it could do so by collaborating and being submissive to Japan in what they deemed as their "Peace Movement". Wang experienced resistance to his government when he visited Shanghai, among other cities. It was recorded that "intellectuals who showed sympathy for Wang risked ostracism, if not death."

During the Second Sino-Japanese War, the National Revolutionary Army was defeated in various battles by the Imperial Japanese Army. Chiang Kai-shek explained that hanjian espionage helped the Japanese. He ordered CC Clique commander Chen Lifu to arrest the hanjians. 4,000 were arrested in Shanghai and 2,000 in Nanjing. Because martial law was enforced, formal trials were not necessary, and the condemned were executed swiftly, while thousands of men, women and children watched with evident approval.

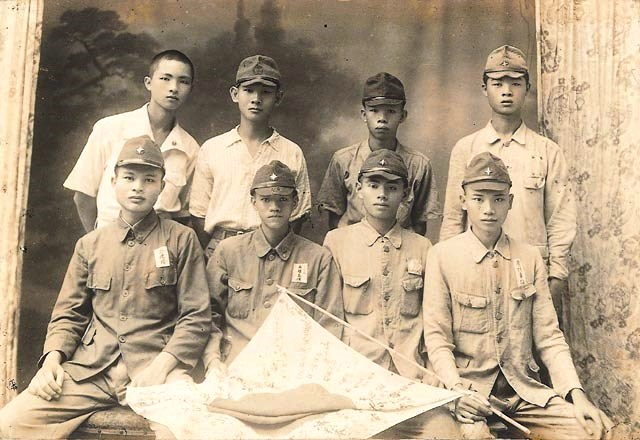
Taiwanese servicemen in the Imperial Japanese Army

Taiwanese soldiers who fought in the Japanese military against Chinese forces and the Allies are also considered to be hanjian. The Republic of China issued an important law in 1937:

The centerpiece of anti-hanjian laws, "Regulations on Handling Hanjian Cases (處理漢奸案件條例; 处理汉奸案件条例; Chŭlǐ Hànjiān Ànjiàn Tiáolì)", promulgated in August 1937, identified collaborators based on their wartime conduct and stipulated punishments regardless of their age, gender, or ethnicity. Popular anti-hanjian discourse, however, paid particular attention to "female collaborators" and deployed a highly gendered vocabulary to attack hanjian suspects of both sexes. Complementing the legal purge of collaborators, such literature brought extreme pressure on individuals targeted as hanjian and influenced how political crimes should be exposed and transposed onto other aspects of social life.

Several Taiwanese were prosecuted by the Nationalist government as hanjian, despite a Judicial Yuan interpretation issued in January 1946 that advised against such action.

After the Sook Ching (肅清; 肃清; Sùqīng) or ethnic cleansing by mass murder of ethnic Chinese opposed to the Japanese occupation of Singapore and Malaya in February–March 1942, Tan Kah Kee, a prominent Chinese industrialist and philanthropist in Southeast Asia, proposed to the provisional Republic of China government to treat all Chinese who attempted to negotiate with the Japanese as hanjians. His proposal was adopted by the Second Legislative Yuan, and was praised by Chinese resistance fighters.

=== Political usage ===
The term hanjian is also used politically, in both the Republic of China and the People's Republic of China, to label certain individuals or movements as treasonous to China, Chinese people, or Chinese interests. In the ROC political song, The Anti-Communist and Anti-Russian Aggression Song, the phrase 殺漢奸 – meaning "kill the hanjians" is sung two times. The term is also used to label the so-called "spiritually Japanese", or Chinese people who express opinions sympathetic of Japanese militarism. It has also been used rhetorically by Chinese nationalists and supporters of Chinese unification, to label supporters of Taiwanese independence and Hong Kong independence.

== Notable people who are considered hanjians ==
- Qin Hui (1091–1155), a Song chancellor who executed a rival politician, Yue Fei, a Song general and war hero who fought against the Jin (a non-Han state) in the Jin-Song Wars. After his death, he was branded a traitor. His political victims, including Yue Fei posthumously, were pardoned by Emperor Xiaozong of Song.
- Wu Sangui (1612–1678), a Ming general who defected to the Qing (a non-Han state) and executed the Yongli Emperor of Ming. He later betrayed the Qing as well, after being demoted of power.
- Wang Kemin (1879–1945), who collaborated with the Japanese during World War II and helped to establish the pro-Japan Provisional Government of the Republic of China (or North China Autonomous Government). After the war, he was arrested by the ROC government and tried for treason but committed suicide before his trial ended.
- Demchugdongrub (1902–1966), commonly known as Prince De, a Mongol leader who collaborated with the Japanese. He was installed by the Japanese as the head of state of Mengjiang, a Japanese puppet state in Inner Mongolia. He was arrested by the PRC government in 1949 and charged with treason but was pardoned later. As he was an ethnic Mongol and not a Han Chinese, some do not consider him to be a hanjian.
- Wang Jingwei (1883–1944), a left-wing Kuomintang politician, revolutionary and former close aide of Sun Yat-sen, who collaborated with the Japanese during the Second Sino-Japanese War. He led the pro-Japan Reorganized National Government of China in Nanjing under the control of the Japanese.
- Zhou Fohai (1897–1948), the second-in-command of the Wang Jingwei government's Executive Yuan. He was convicted of treason after the war and sentenced to death, but Chiang Kai-shek commuted his sentence to life imprisonment. He died of heart and stomach problems in jail.
- Chen Gongbo (1892–1946), who served as the head of the Legislative Yuan of the Wang Jingwei government, is seen as one of China's most prominent hanjians. Chen held important positions within the Reorganized Nationalist Government of the Republic of China and succeeded Wang Jingwei as acting chairman after Wang's death in November 1944. Chen was accused of "plotting with the enemy" and "opposing the central government". Chen defended his work with the Reorganized Nationalist Government of the Republic of China by describing it as "negotiating with the Japanese in an attempt to preserve China’s resources, protect its people, and slowly erode Japan’s control over China." He fled to Japan after the war but was extradited back to China, where he was convicted of treason and executed.
- Yoshiko Kawashima (1907–1948), also known as the "Eastern Jewel", was a Manchu royal raised in Japan who spied for the Japanese in Manchuria. After the war, they were arrested, convicted of treason, and executed. They have been featured in numerous Chinese and Japanese novels, films, television programs, and video games, with the Chinese frequently depicting them as a wanton villain and seductress while the Japanese portrayed them as a tragic hero. Due to their Manchu ethnicity and Japanese background, some do not consider them to be a hanjian.
- Yoshiko Yamaguchi (1920–2014), also known as Li Xianglan, was one of the Seven Great Singing Stars. After the war, she was arrested and sentenced to death for starring in Japanese propaganda films, but after Chinese authorities discovered her Japanese ancestry, she was acquitted, but warned to leave China by the judges due to risk of lynching. As she was the daughter of Japanese immigrants, some do not consider her to be a hanjian.
- Date Junnosuke (1892–1948), also known as Zhang Zongyuan, was a sworn brother of Fengtian Clique warlord Zhang Zongchang, who changed his nationality to Chinese in 1931, though he was of Japanese ethnicity. He took over Jinan and led a massacre of around 400 people in 1939. In 1945, he created the ultimately unsuccessful Zhang Zongchang Unit. After the war, he was arrested for war crimes and executed by firing squad. As he was ethnically Japanese, some do not consider him to be a hanjian.
- Chen Bijun (1891-1959), wife of Wang Jingwei, was among those convicted by China's Nationalist government as hanjian.
- Zhang Haipeng (1867–1949) was a General of Manchukuo Imperial Army. Following the collapse of Manchukuo in 1945, he hid in Tianjin to escape his arrest. He was later discovered, tried and sentenced to death in 1949 in Beijing for treason.
- Lee Teng-hui (1923–2020) was a former President of the Republic of China who was heavily associated with the Taiwan independence movement. He served in the Imperial Japanese Army from 1944 to 1945, which would meet the wartime Kuomintang classification of hanjian, which included Taiwanese who served in the Japanese military. His statements regarding Japan (including denial of the Nanjing massacre and referring to Japan as his "motherland" despite his Chinese (Hakka) origin), wartime service for the Japanese military and visits to the Yasukuni Shrine have generated significant controversy on both Taiwan and Mainland China, especially amongst the conservative Chinese nationalist Pan-Blue Coalition as well as the Communist authorities on mainland China. In 2015, Kuomintang legislators and then-incumbent President Ma Ying-jeou accused Lee of treason and being a hanjian. However, as he was Taiwanese by birth, some feel he should not be formally categorized as a hanjian.

== In popular culture ==
Popularly, most hanjian in Chinese films and drama series, skits, Hanjian are mostly the translators. Sometimes they are also called the er guizi (Chinese: 二鬼子, lit. second devils) or jia yang guizi (Chinese: 假洋鬼子, lit. fake foreign devils). For example, Chinese actor Chen Peisi's famous skit Zhujue yu Peijue (主角与配角, lit. the main actor and the supportive actor), Chen is acting as the supportive actor who is in a film that the character is the translator leading the way for Japanese Imperial Army. The translator represents the Army officer to send a message to the Eighth Route Army officer whose actor would be Zhu Shimao that if he surrenders, the Japanese officer will have a great beautiful offer for him.

== See also ==
- Treason
- Collaborationism
- Chinilpa
- Makapili
- Collaborationist Chinese Army
- Taiwanese Imperial Japan Serviceman
- Vichy France
- Quisling
- Benedict Arnold
- Uncle Tom
- Judas
- Judenrat
- Spiritually Japanese
- Việt gian
- Zappo Zap
- Race traitor
- Legion of the Just Ruler
