= Taiwan Is Good =

Patriotic song of the Republic of China (Taiwan)

Song
- Genre: Anthem

Taiwan is Good (Chinese: 台湾好; Wade–Giles: Tʻai^{2}wan^{1} hao^{3}) is a patriotic song of the Republic of China (ROC), which its tune was originally from the indigenous songs of Amis people and Paiwan people in Taitung County area. It is about the ROC government and people's desire to retake Mainland China from the Chinese Communist forces. It also celebrates the development of modern Taiwan, which is considered one province of the whole ROC. This is also one of the very few ROC political songs that used Taiwan as main themes.

== Lyrics ==
Chinese	English
台灣好(Táiwān hǎo)，台灣好(táiwān hǎo)，台灣真是復興島(táiwān zhēnshi fùxīng dǎo)！ 愛國英雄英勇志士(Àiguó yīngxióng yīngyǒng zhìshì)，都投到她的懷抱(dōu tóu dào tā de huáibào)。 我們受溫暖的和風(Wǒmen shòu wēnnuǎn de héfēng)，我們聽雄壯的海濤(wǒmen tīng xióngzhuàng dì hǎi tāo)， 我們愛國的情緒(wǒmen àiguó de qíngxù)，比那阿里山高(bǐ nà Ālǐshān gāo)，阿里山高(Ālǐshān gāo)！ 我們忘不了大陸上的同胞(Wǒmen wàng bùliǎo dàlù shàng de tóngbāo)， 在死亡線上掙扎(zài sǐwáng xiànshàng zhēngzhá)，在集中營裡苦惱(zài jízhōngyíng lǐ kǔnǎo)。 他們在求救(Tāmen zài qiújiù)，他們在哀嚎(tāmen zài āiháo)， 你聽他們在求救(nǐ tīng tāmen zài qiújiù)，他們在哀嚎求救哀嚎(tāmen zài āiháo qiújiù āiháo)！ 我們的血湧如潮(Wǒmen de xuè yǒng rú cháo)，我們的心在狂跳(wǒmen de xīn zài kuáng tiào)， 槍在肩刀出鞘(qiāng zài jiān dāo chū qiào)，破敵城斬群妖(pò dí chéng zhǎn qún yāo)。 我們的兄弟姊妹(Wǒmen de xiōngdì zǐmèi)，我們的父老(wǒmen de fùlǎo)， 我們快要打回大陸來了(wǒmen kuàiyào dǎ huí dàlù láile)，回來了快要回來了(huíláile kuàiyào huíláile)！	Taiwan is good! Taiwan is good! Taiwan truly is an island of renewal! Patriotic heroes and courageous fighters all leap into her embrace. We enjoy temperate breezes, we listen to majestic ocean waves, Our love of country is greater than the height of Alishan, greater than the height of Alishan! We can never forget our Mainland compatriots, Who are struggling on the brink of death, who are distressed in their internments. They are pleading for help, they are wailing, Hear them pleading for help, they are wailing, pleading for help, wailing! Our blood rushes like the tide, our hearts beat wildly, Our guns are at our shoulders, our swords are unsheathed, breaking through enemy cities and felling multitudes of monsters. Our brothers and sisters, our fathers and elderly, We are returning soon to counterattack the Mainland, we are returning, we are returning soon!
