= Go and Reclaim the Mainland =

Chinese propaganda song

- Traditional Chinese: 反攻大陸去
- Simplified Chinese: 反攻大陆去
Transcriptions
Standard Mandarin
- Hanyu Pinyin: Fǎngōng Dàlù Qù
- Bopomofo: ㄈㄢˇ ㄍㄨㄥ ㄉㄚˋ ㄌㄨˋ ㄑㄩˋ
- Wade–Giles: Fan^{3}-kung^{1} Ta^{4}-lu^{4} Chʻü^{4}
- IPA: [fàn kʊ́ŋ tâ lû tɕʰŷ]
Wu
- Wugniu: fae^{3} kon^{1} da^{6} loq^{8} chi^{5}
- IPA: Shanghainese: [fe˧ koŋ˦ da˨ loʔ˥ tɕʰi˨˩]
Yue: Cantonese
- Yale Romanization: fáangūng daaihluhk heui
- Jyutping: faan^{2} gung^{1} daai^{6} luk^{6} heoi^{3}
- IPA: [fan˧˥ kʊŋ˥ taj˨ lʊk̚˨ hɵɥ˧]

Go and Reclaim the Mainland is an anti-communist patriotic song created by the government of the Republic of China on Taiwan to promote Chinese unification and Project National Glory.

It was composed by Li Zhonghe (李中和) and the lyrics were written by Jing Shu (精舒).

== Lyrics ==
Chinese lyrics

反攻、反攻、反攻大陸去；
反攻、反攻、反攻大陸去！
大陸是我們的國土，大陸是我們的疆域；
我們的國土，我們的疆域；
不能讓共匪盡著盤據，不能讓俄寇盡著欺侮；
我們要反攻回去，我們要反攻回去；
反攻回去，反攻回去；
把大陸收復，把大陸收復！

Hanyu Pinyin

Fǎngōng, fǎngōng, fǎngōng dàlù qù;
Fǎngōng, fǎngōng, fǎngōng dàlù qù!
Dàlù shì wǒmen de guótǔ, dàlù shì wǒmen de jiāngyù;
Wǒmen de guótǔ, wǒmen de jiāngyù;
Bùnéng ràng gòngfěi jǐnzhe pán jù, bùnéng ràng é kòu jǐnzhe qīwǔ;
Wǒmen yào fǎngōng huíqù, wǒmen yào fǎngōng huíqù;
Fǎngōng huíqù, fǎngōng huíqù;
Bǎ dàlù shōufù, bǎ dàlù shōufù!

English Translation

Go and reclaim, reclaim, reclaim the mainland;
Go and reclaim, reclaim, reclaim the mainland!
The mainland is our homeland, the mainland is our territory;
Our homeland, our territory;
We can't let the commies occupy it, we can't let the russkies bully it;
We must go back and reclaim it, we must go back and reclaim it;
Reclaim it, reclaim it;
Recover the mainland, recover the mainland!

== Legacy ==
The song was uploaded by the hacking group Anonymous to a Chinese government tourism promotion website which they hacked on September-October 2021.

== See also ==
- Counterattack the mainland (反攻大陸)
