= 800 Heroes Song =

Chinese patriotic song

- Traditional Chinese: 八百壯士歌
- Simplified Chinese: 八百壮士歌
Transcriptions
Standard Mandarin
- Hanyu Pinyin: Bābǎi Zhùangshì Gē
- Wade–Giles: Pa^{1}-pai^{3} Chuang^{4}-shih^{4} Ko^{1}

China Will Not Perish
- Traditional Chinese: 中國不會亡
- Simplified Chinese: 中国不会亡
Transcriptions
Standard Mandarin
- Hanyu Pinyin: Zhōngguó Bùhùi Wáng
- Wade–Giles: Chung^{1}-kuo^{2} Pu^{4}-hui^{4} Wang^{2}

The 800 Heroes Song, also known by the title "China Will Not Perish", is a Chinese patriotic song from the Second Sino-Japanese War. The song was written to commemorate the heroic efforts of the lone battalion of the National Revolutionary Army in the Defense of Sihang Warehouse during the final stage of the Battle of Shanghai (1937).

After the Second Sino-Japanese War, the Kuomintang government changed the title and lyrics to "China Shall be Strong" (traditional Chinese: 中國一定強; simplified Chinese: 中国一定强; pinyin: Zhōngguó Yídìng Qiáng; Wade–Giles: Chung^{1}-kuo^{2} I^{2}-ting^{4} Ch'iang^{2}).

== Lyrics ==
| Simplified Chinese | Traditional Chinese | Pinyin | English Translation |
|---|---|---|---|
| 中国不会亡,中国不会亡, 你看民族英雄谢团长。 中国不会亡,中国不会亡, 你看那八百壮士孤军奋斗守战场, 四方都是炮火,四方都是豺狼, 宁愿死不退让,宁愿死不投降。 我们的国旗在重围中飘荡飘荡,飘荡飘荡,飘荡。 八百壮士一条心,十万强敌不能挡, 我们的行动伟烈,我们的气节豪壮, 同胞们起来!同胞们起来! 快快赶上战场,拿八百壮士做榜样。 中国不会亡,中国不会亡, 中国不会亡,中国不会亡! 不会亡! 不会亡! 不会亡! | 中國不會亡,中國不會亡, 你看民族英雄謝團長。 中國不會亡,中國不會亡, 你看那八百壯士孤軍奮鬥守戰場, 四方都是砲火,四方都是豺狼, 寧願死不退讓,寧願死不投降。 我們的國旗在重圍中飄蕩飄蕩,飄蕩飄蕩,飄蕩。 八百壯士一條心,十萬強敵不能擋, 我們的行動偉烈,我們的氣節豪壯, 同胞們起來!同胞們起來! 快快趕上戰場,拿八百壯士做榜樣。 中國不會亡,中國不會亡, 中國不會亡,中國不會亡! 不會亡! 不會亡! 不會亡! | Zhōngguó bùhuì wáng, Zhōngguó bùhuì wáng, Nǐ kàn mínzú yīngxióng Xiè túanzhǎng. Zhōngguó bùhuì wáng, Zhōngguó bùhuì wáng, Nǐ kàn nà bābǎi zhùangshì gūjūn fèndòu shǒu zhànchǎng, Sìfāng dōushì pàohuǒ, Sìfāng dōushì cháiláng, Níngyuàn sǐ bù tuìràng, Níngyuàn sǐ bù tóuxiáng Wǒměn de guóqí zài chóngwǒi zhōng piāodàng piāodàng, piāodàng piāodàng, piāodàng. Bābǎi zhuàngshì yī tiáo xīn, shíwàn qíangdí bù néng dǎng, Wǒměn de xíngdòng wěiliè, wǒměn de qìjié háozhuàng, Tǒngbāomen qǐlái! Tǒngbāomen qǐlái! Kuàikuài gǎnshàng zhànchǎng, ná bābăi zhuàngshì zuò bǎngyàng. Zhōngguó bùhuì wáng, Zhōngguó bùhuì wáng, Zhōngguó bùhuì wáng, Zhōngguó bùhuì wáng! Bùhuì wáng! Bùhuì wáng! Bùhuì wáng! | China will not die, China will not die, Look at our national hero Colonel Xie [Colonel Hsieh]. China will not die, China will not die, Watch the eight hundred heroes of the lone battalion fight for every inch of land, From four sides come the gunfire, from the four sides come the wolves, They would rather die than retreat, they would rather die than surrender. Amidst the sea of chaos our nations's flag flies proudly, flies proudly, flies proudly, flies proudly. Eight hundred heroic hearts all beat as one, unstoppable to the thousands of enemies, Our actions are mighty, our integrity heroic Comrades, arise! Comrades, arise! Let's answer the call to arms, and follow the example of the eight hundred heroes China will not die, China will not die! Will not die! Will not die! Will not die! |

== See also ==
- Kuomintang
- Chiang Kai-shek Memorial Song
