= Communist bandit =

Anti-communist epithet directed at the Chinese Communist Party

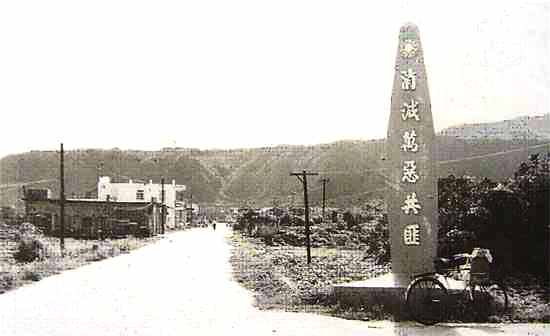
"Exterminate the hordes of Communist bandits" (消滅萬惡共匪) slogan on Lyudao, in 1950s Taiwan.

"Communist bandit" (Chinese: 共匪; pinyin: gòngfěi) is an anti-communist epithet directed at members of the Chinese Communist Party. The term originated from the Nationalist government in 1927 during the Chinese Civil War. Outside mainland China, some Chinese people now use the term "中共" (zhōnggòng, literally: "Chinese Communist") to refer to the People's Republic of China or the Chinese Communist Party. It could also be translated to the English term "commie".

== Etymology ==
The characters for "Communist bandits" are composed as follows:

1. Gòng (Chinese: 共; pinyin: gòng) is a shorter writing for the term meaning "communism" (共產主義).
2. Fěi (Chinese: 匪; pinyin: fěi), "bandits"

== History ==
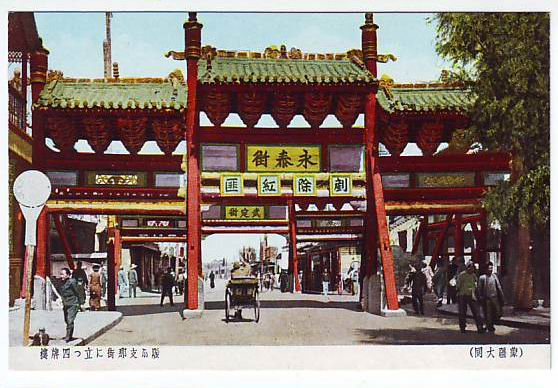
"Destroy the Red bandits", a slogan on a gate in Japanese-occupied Datong.

The term of "Communist bandits" to describe the Chinese Communist Party during the Chinese Civil War between the Nationalists and the Communists. When the Imperial Japanese Army occupied parts of China during the Second Sino-Japanese War, the Japanese occupation authorities used the term "Red bandits" and "Communist bandits". On July 15, 1947, Document 0744 ordered the CCP and its forces to be called "Communist bandits" as a form of rectification of names, to the exclusion of all other terms, such as "Red bandits" (in Chinese 赤匪). Along with the term fei, the term was used in official documents to describe the authorities established on Mainland China and their agencies, and in several slogans such as "Fight against Communist Bandit's Animalistic Life". In the 1980s, the term was replaced by "Chinese Communist Authorities".

In 1996, Microsoft halted sales of its Windows 95 operating system in mainland China due to discoveries that it contained the term in Chinese-language input method software bundled with the operating system following police raids on computer stores. In addition, the term is also used towards non-Chinese communists or communist-governed countries, such as Yuenán gòngfei (越南共匪, directed at Communist Party of Vietnam or Viet Cong and the Vietnamese people), or Běihán gòngfei (北韓共匪, directed at Workers' Party of Korea and the North Koreans).

In May 2020, it became known that YouTube had been deleting any use of the term since October 2019. Posted comments containing the phrase would shortly disappear without a reason being given. Alphabet, owner of YouTube, said the removal of such comments was "an error".

== Similar terms in other countries ==
=== British Malaya ===
During the Malayan Emergency, until 1952, Malayan National Liberation Army fighters were themed "communist bandits" or simply "bandits." The term was changed to "Communist Terrorists", often shortened to "CTs", because it brought comparisons to the People's Liberation Army which ultimately won the Chinese Civil War in 1949

=== Greece ===
During the Greek Civil War, Democratic Army of Greece (DSE) fighters were called "Communist bandits" (Κομμουνιστοσυμμορίτες, Kommounistosymmorites, ΚΣ) by the Royalist forces. In 1989, a law unanimously passed by the Hellenic Parliament replaced this term with "Fighters of DSE."

== Popular culture ==
There is a pastry shop in Chiayi, Taiwan named 共匪餅, meaning "Communist Bandit Pastries", which makes light of the martial law era epithet.

== See also ==
- Anti–People's Republic of China sentiment
- Anti-communism in China
- Mandarin Chinese profanity
