= Fan Tchunpi =

Chinese artist

Fan Tchunpi or Fang Junbi (Chinese: 方君璧; pinyin: Fāng Jūnbì; 1898–1986) was a Chinese artist known for her guóhuà brush-and-ink paintings, which combine European and Chinese elements. Her retrospective exhibitions were held at the Hood Museum of Art, the Musée Cernuschi, and the Fung Ping Shan Museum.

== Background ==
Born in Fuzhou, Fan was the eleventh child of a wealthy merchant family. Her siblings include Fang Shengdong and Fang Junying. In 1912, she moved to France with Junying and sister-in-law Zeng Xing. From 1917 Fan studied art at the Académie Julian in Paris and then at the École des Beaux-Arts in Bordeaux, where she graduated in 1920. Upon her return to China, she became closely associated with the Lingnan School of traditional Chinese painters based in Shanghai. Forced into exile with the establishment of the People's Republic of China in 1949, Fan fled to Paris and eventually moved to Boston in 1957, returning to China only once in 1972. She finally moved to Geneva in 1983, where she lived until her death.

== Career ==
While studying in France, Fan became the first Chinese female student to enter the École nationale supérieure des Beaux-Arts exhibition. She was also the first Chinese female artist to be included in the annual Salon Société des Artistes Françaises. Fan published books in China on her oil painting, including a 1938 volume with a foreword by Cai Yuanpei, former Chinese Minister of Education and a classical scholar. She met Qi Baishi in 1943 and worked in close contact with him until leaving China, producing a series of solo exhibitions from 1944 to 1949.

== Work ==
Fan's early works reflect the Impressionist style of French artists like Paul-Albert Besnard, with whom she studied in 1926. After returning to China, Fan became one of several 20th-century Chinese artists who sought to revitalize the tradition of Chinese brush-and-ink painting as a self-conscious expression of national identity. Her work from this period is particularly influenced by the founders of the Lingnan School, Gao Jianfu (1879–1951) and his brother Gao Qifeng (1889–1933), who combined Western pictorial devices such as single-point perspective and atmospheric light with highly naturalistic and patriotic scenes of modern-day life in China.

== Personal life ==
In 1922, Fan married Zeng Zhongming. They had three children. In 1939, Zeng, then secretary to Wang Jingwei, was assassinated in Hanoi by Chiang Kai-shek's agents. Fan was seriously injured but survived.
