= Canton Coup =

1926 purge undertaken by Chiang Kai-shek

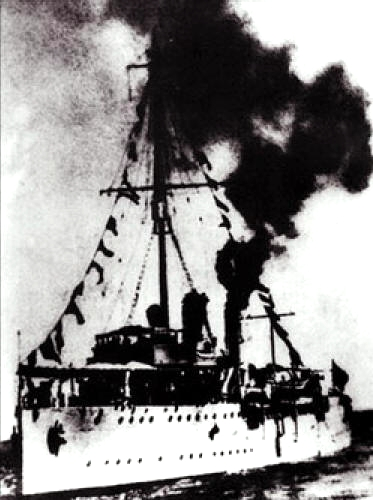
- The Zhongshan under steam.

Zhongshan Incident
- Traditional Chinese: 中山艦事件
- Simplified Chinese: 中山舰事件
- Literal meaning: Zhongshan Warship Incident
Transcriptions
Standard Mandarin
- Hanyu Pinyin: Zhōngshān Jiàn Shìjiàn

March 20th Incident
- Chinese: 三二〇事件
- Literal meaning: 3/20 Incident
Transcriptions
Standard Mandarin
- Hanyu Pinyin: Sān-Èr-Líng Shìjiàn

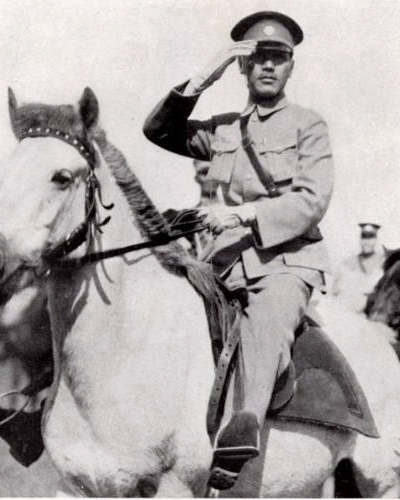
Chiang Kai-shek leading the Northern Expedition in 1926.

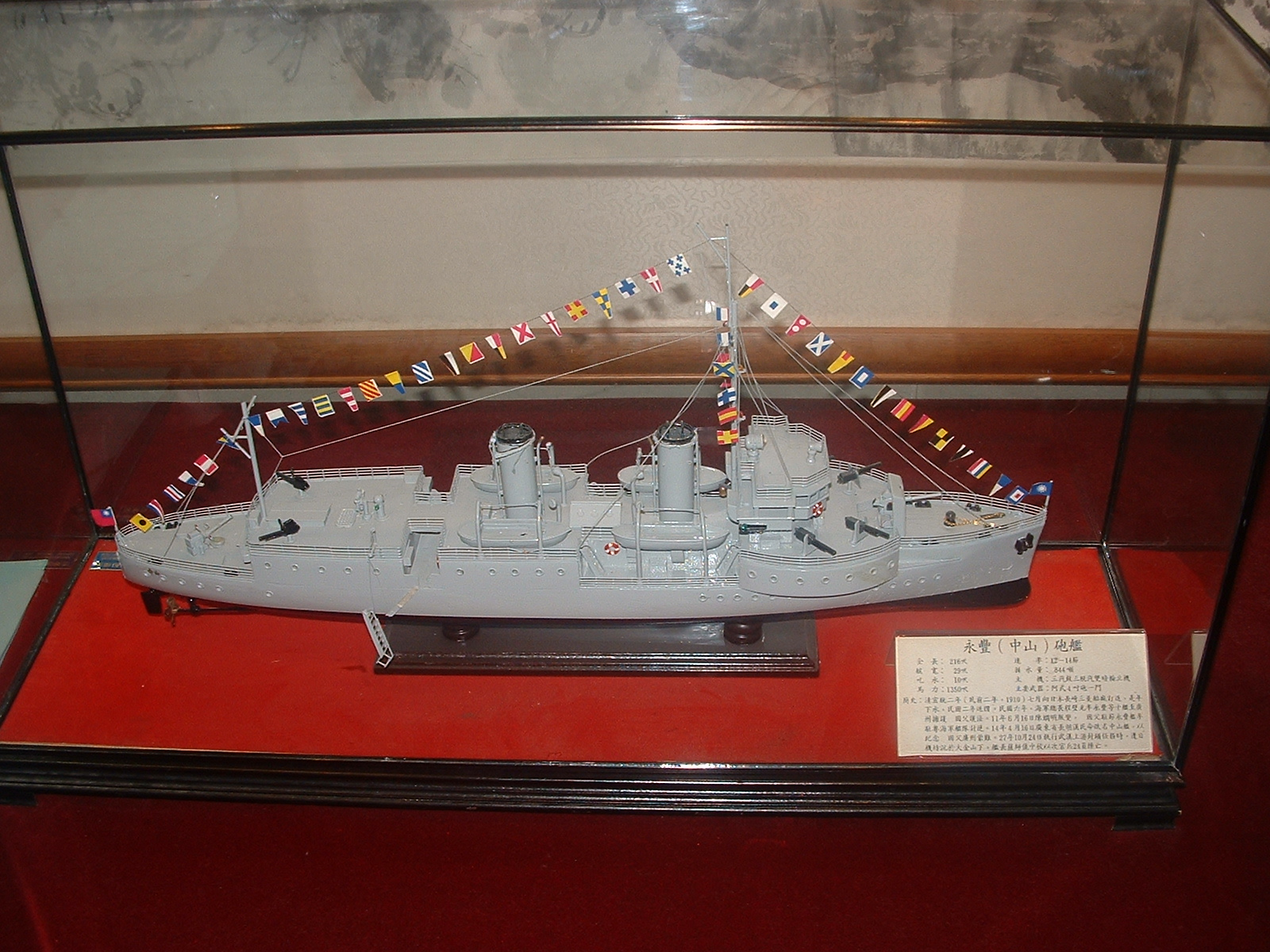
A model of the Zhongshan.

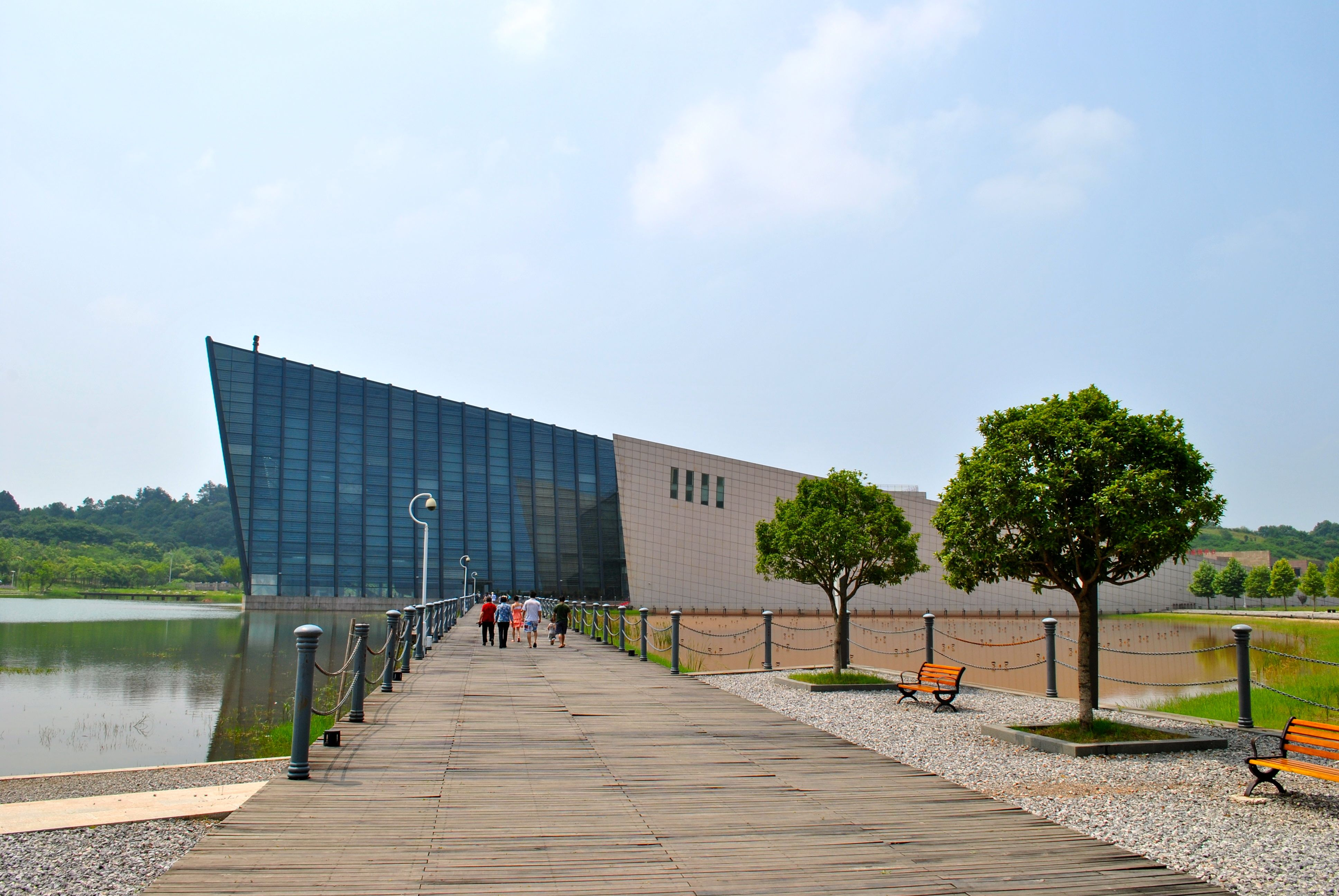
The Zhongshan Warship Museum in Wuhan.

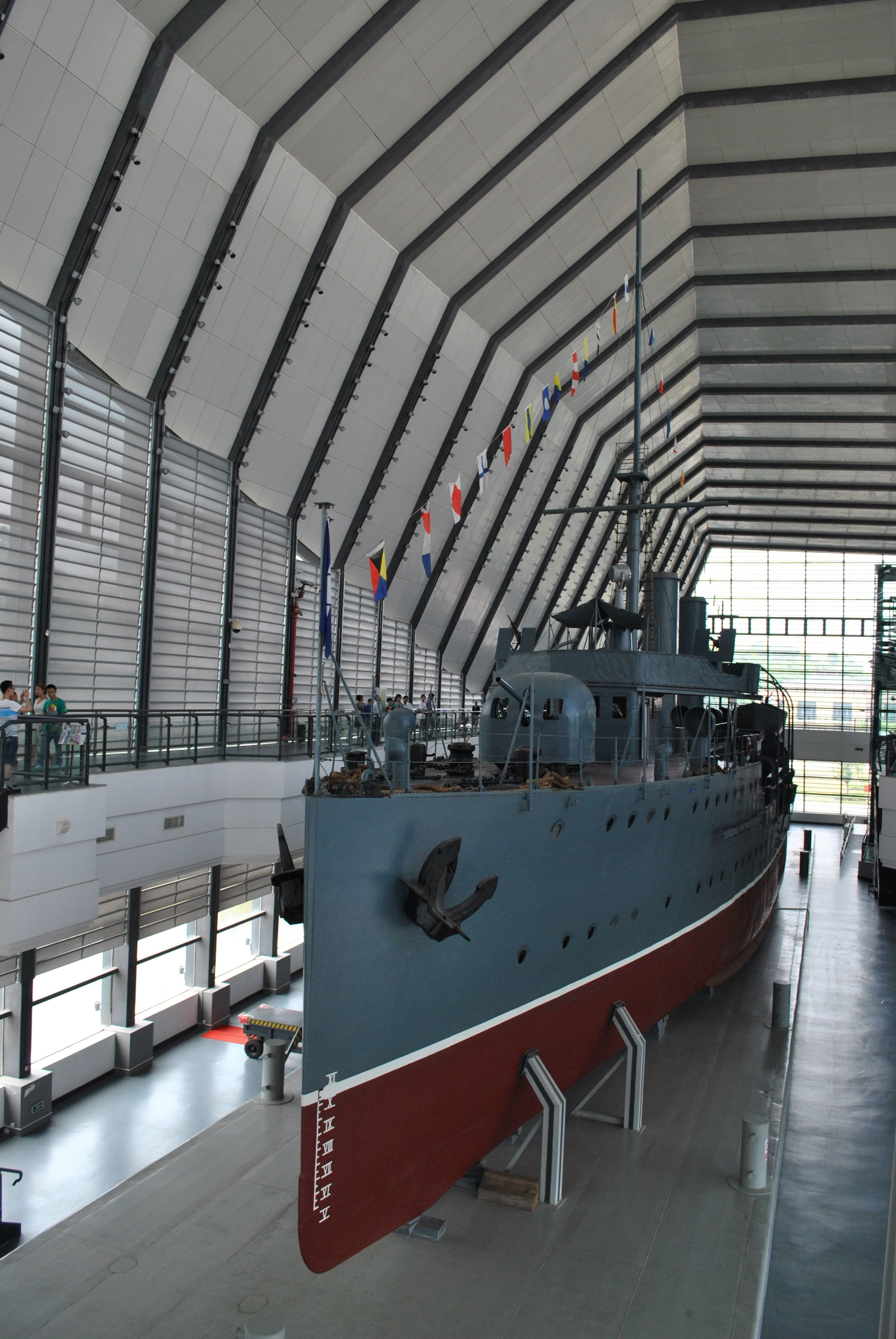
The restored warship.

The Canton Coup of 20 March 1926, also known as the Zhongshan Incident or the March 20th Incident, was a purge of Chinese Communist Party elements of the National Revolutionary Army in Guangzhou (then romanized as "Canton") undertaken by Chiang Kai-shek. The incident solidified Chiang's power immediately before the successful Northern Expedition, turning him into the paramount leader of the country.

== History ==
=== Background ===
At the time of the incident, the Nationalists and Chinese Communist Party (CCP) were working together as part of the First United Front, allied against the local warlords who were carving the country into fiefdoms. The Soviet Union was working with both groups and notably bankrolling Guangzhou's Whampoa Military Academy. It had assisted Sun Yat-sen in regaining control of Guangdong; after his death from cancer in 1925, the Nationalists began a protracted leadership struggle that included interprovincial war. The assassination of Liao Zhongkai led to Hu Hanmin's ouster and the promotion of Chiang Kai-shek, then commandant of the military academy, to commander of the National Revolutionary Army. There were plans for a northern offensive against the warlords, but leadership remained divided—principally between the right-wing Chiang and the left-wing Wang Jingwei. With support from the Soviets and the CCP, the left wing looked ascendant: Hu had said the Nationalists' ultimate goal was socialism and the January 1926 party conference had placed CCP members in strategic posts and the party apparently "almost wholly under leftist control".

=== Incident ===
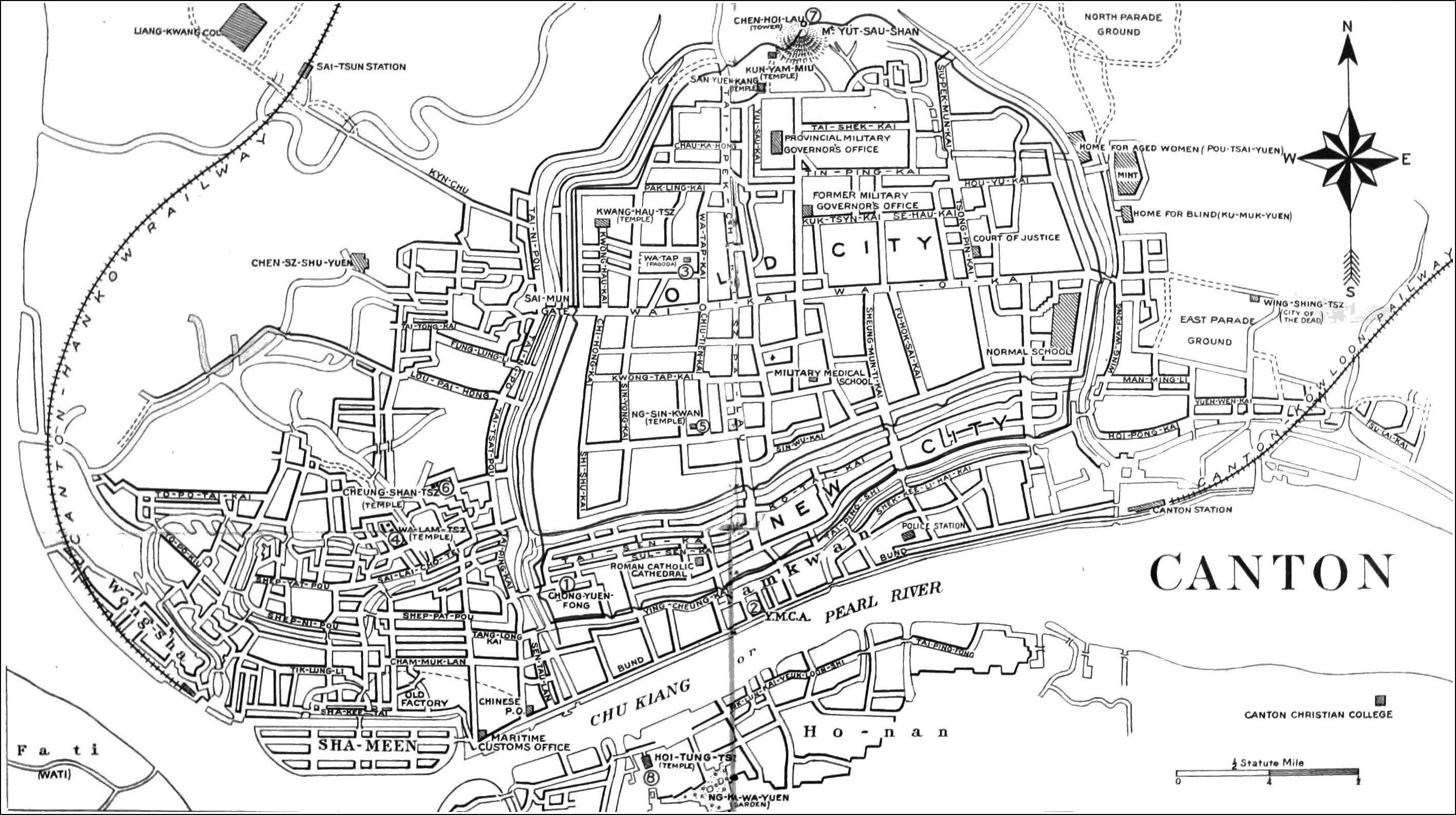
Guangzhou ("Canton") in the 1920s.

The coastal defense ship SS Yongfeng had been renamed the SS Zhongshan (romanized at the time as Chung Shan) in honor of Sun Yat-sen (Note: Among Sun's many names, "Zhongshan" is the most popular within China.) following his death. It was the most powerful ship in the Nationalist navy. Its captain, Li Zhilong, was a Communist, working with a Soviet naval advisor. They had moved his warship to Guangzhou to support uprisings in the area, alarming the Nationalists. On the night of 18/19 March it suddenly relocated from Guangzhou to anchorage off Changzhou ("Dane's Island"). It then sailed back the next day.

In his subsequent reports, Chiang stated that he became alarmed when the ship's commander claimed to be acting on orders from him, which he had never given. His suspicions were further increased by numerous odd phone calls. Chen Jieru reported that Wang's wife Chen Bijun had called her five times on the 18th to check Chiang's schedule. Xu Zhen reported repeated calls by Deng Yanda, Whampoa's political director, inquiring when Chiang would next ride to Changzhou; upon Chiang telling him it would not be soon, Li Zhilong called him to report Deng's order to depart. Li Dongfang stated that Chiang never explained who had made the repeated calls but thought it to have been Wang Jingwei. In reaction, Chiang purchased a ticket on a Japanese steamer to Shantou but ultimately decided to fight rather than run. Andrei Bubnov, head of the Soviet mission in Guangzhou, noted in his reports that the incident was due to an abortive putsch mistakenly pursued by some of the CCP commanders in the Nationalist army.

On 20 March 1926 Chiang declared martial law and cut off Guangzhou's phone network. He used Nationalist troops and cadets from the Whampoa Military Academy (where he was commandant) to arrest its CCP political commissars. Chen Zhaoying, Chen Ce and Ouyang Ge arrested Li Zhilong in his bedroom at dawn and secured the warship, with Jiang Dingwen taking Li's place at the Navy Bureau. Wu Tiecheng and Hui Dongsheng surrounded the residences of Wang Jingwei and the Soviet advisors, effectively placing them under house arrest. Deng Yanda was arrested. Hui also surrounded the Guangzhou–Hong Kong Strike Committee. Liu Zhi arrested Communists in the 2nd Division and those at Whampoa or in the 1st Corps—including Zhou Enlai—were arrested and later expelled following "Three Principles" orientation. Two garrisons were removed. Chiang's men also disarmed the CCP's paramilitary Workers' Guard. Gen. Victor Rogacheff, the head of the Soviet military mission at Guangzhou, fled to Beijing but Vasily Blyukher, the military consultant to the Nationalists, and Mikhail Borodin, the political consultant helping to remake the KMT into a Leninist organization, were both arrested; Borodin's assistant Kassanga (pseudonym of Nikolay Kuibyshev) was expelled on the 24th.

Wang Jingwei, who had a high fever at the time, was visited by Chen Gongbo; Tan Yankai, head of the 2nd Corps; Zhu Peide (3rd Corps); Li Jishen (4th Corps); and T. V. Soong, the minister of finance. Wang was indignant and some of the others felt Chiang was overreacting, but the Nationalist Executive Committee convened at the house on 22 March and a compromise was reached in which Wang would take a vacation abroad in the near future.

=== Aftermath ===
The Canton Coup effectively ended the efforts of the Chinese Communists and the Soviet Union to undermine the right wing of the Nationalists through steady work to strengthen the party's left wing. As the Soviets were anxious to maintain their influence and Chiang had need of their help in the upcoming Northern Expedition; however, he and A.S. Bubnov negotiated a new accord. The Soviets would maintain some advisors and provide support but recall Kuibishev, provide a list of Communist members in the KMT and accept that Communists would no longer hold top cabinet positions. On 3 April a public telegram from Chiang stated that the affair was a "limited and individual matter" of "a small number of members of our Party who had carried out an anti-revolutionary plot". He removed some right-wingers from leadership, including Wu Tiecheng, and criticized the Western Hills Group. He also forbade right-wing demonstrations and never publicly questioned the United Front. Trotsky in Russia and the central committees of the Communist Party in Shanghai and Guangdong all opposed the arrangement with Chiang, but Stalin backed it. On May 15 the Nationalists required the Communists "not to entertain any doubt on or criticize Dr Sun or his principles"; to provide lists of their members within the Nationalist Party; to not exceed one-third of the membership of any municipal, provincial or central party committee; and not to serve as the head of any government department or party. The same session formalized Chiang's leadership of the party and army, ending civilian oversight of the Nationalist military. "Emergency decrees" soon expanded Chiang's power for the duration of the Northern Expedition, although his direct control of the military remained partial owing to its regional composition and divided loyalties.

On 7 April, Wang Jingwei resigned his posts and announced he would travel abroad; he left for France secretly on May 11. Bubnov was recalled to Russia the same month. Wang finally returned in April of the next year, invited by Borodin to counter Chiang's success. Zhou Enlai, removed from his posts in Guangzhou, travelled to Shanghai, where he organized strikes by hundreds of thousands of factory workers in February and March 1927.

== Controversy ==
The CCP denied that there was any plot against Chiang Kai-shek and claimed that his actions were simply intended to remove the left-wing Wang Jingwei from influence over the National Revolutionary Army and over Guangzhou's important military academy.

Historians disagree on whether the incident was plotted by Chiang Kai-shek; (Note: Zhang Qianwu has gone so far as questioning whether Li was even the captain of the Zhongshan and argued from surviving records that Li's "orders" were forgeries and that the actual commander was Zhang Chentong.) a CCP plot to kidnap him and remove him to Vladivostok; or the whole affair was merely "a series of miscommunications, misunderstandings, faulty telephone connections and personal rivalries among junior staff".

== See also ==
- Outline of the Chinese Civil War
- Shanghai massacre
- Warlord Era
- March 18 Massacre
