= 6th Congress =

6th Congress may refer to:

- 6th Congress of the Communist Party of Cuba (2011)
- 6th Congress of the Communist Party of Yugoslavia (1952)
- 6th Congress of the Party of Labour of Albania (1971)
- 6th Congress of the Philippines (1966–1969)
- 6th Congress of the Russian Social Democratic Labour Party (Bolsheviks) (1917)
- 6th Congress of the Workers' Party of Korea (1980)
- 6th National Congress of the Chinese Communist Party (1928)
- 6th National Congress of the Communist Party of Vietnam (1986)
- 6th National Congress of the Kuomintang (1945)
- 6th National Congress of the Kuomintang (Wang Jingwei) (1939)
- 6th National Congress of the Lao People's Revolutionary Party (1996)
- 6th National People's Congress (1983–1988)
- 6th United States Congress (1799–1801)
- International Socialist Congress, Amsterdam 1904, the 6th Congress of the Second International
