= Wang Jingwei =

Chinese politician (1883–1944)

Wang Jingwei Wang Ching-wei
- 汪精衛
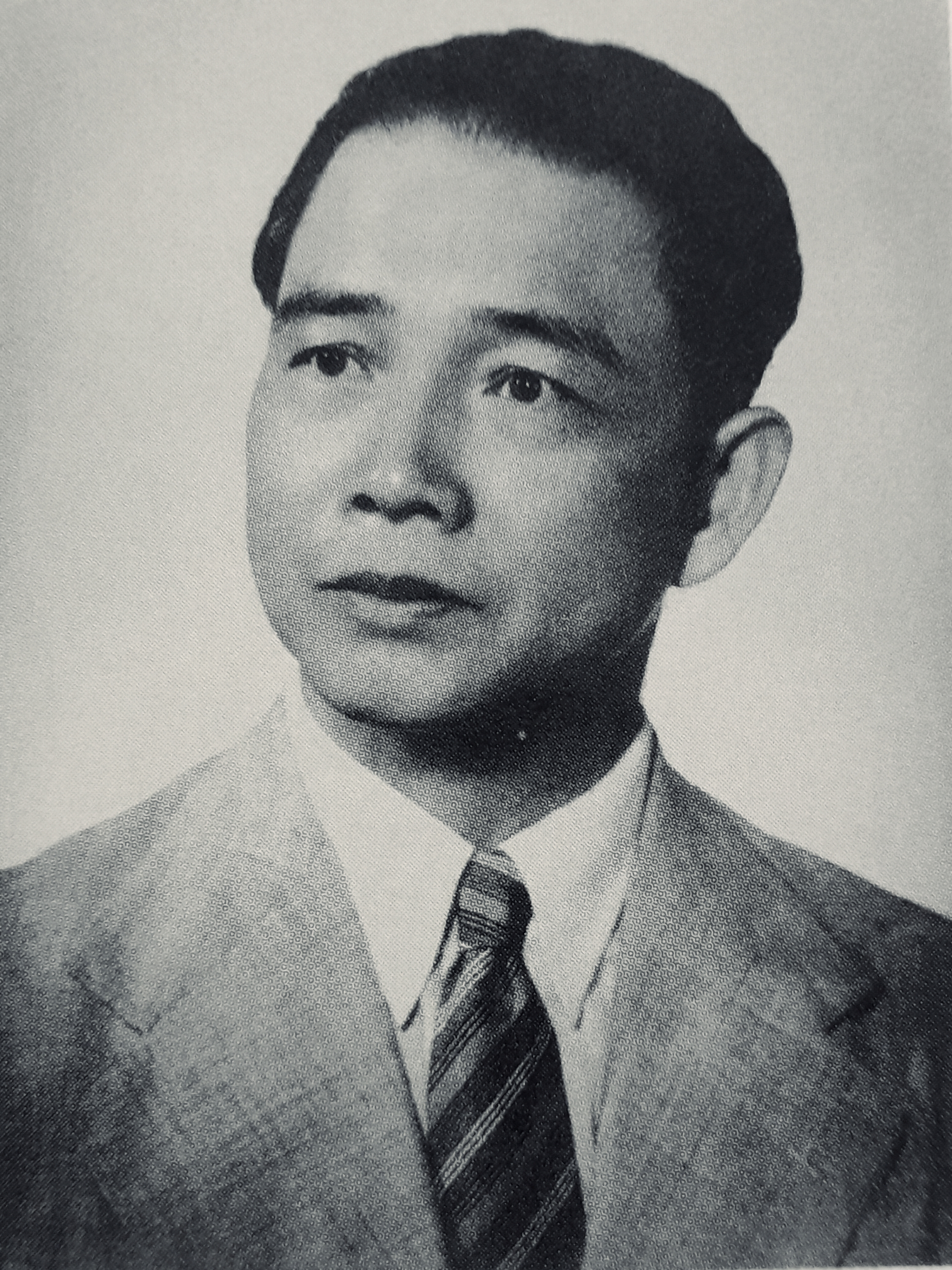

1st Chairman of the National Government Committee of China (Wang Jingwei regime)
- In office 28 November 1940 – 10 November 1944
- Preceded by: Office established
- Succeeded by: Chen Gongbo

Premier of China (Wang Jingwei regime)
- In office 30 March 1940 – 10 November 1944
- Preceded by: Office established
- Succeeded by: Chen Gongbo

1st Chairman of the Central Political Committee (Wang Jingwei regime)
- In office 24 March 1940 – 10 November 1944
- Preceded by: Office established
- Succeeded by: Chen Gongbo

Chairman of Kuomintang (Wang Jingwei regime)
- In office 28 November 1939 – 10 November 1944
- Preceded by: Office established
- Succeeded by: Chen Gongbo
Other offices
Chairman of the National Political Consultative Conference
In office 6 July 1938 – 1 January 1939
Preceded by	Office established
Succeeded by	Chang Po-ling (acting)
Vice Director-General of the Kuomintang
In office 1 April 1938 – 1 January 1939
Preceded by	Office established
Succeeded by	Chen Cheng (acting)
Chairman of the Central Political Committee of the Kuomintang
In office 7 December 1935 – 17 November 1937
Preceded by	Chiang Kai-shek
Succeeded by	Chiang Kai-shek
In office 1 July 1925 – 23 March 1926
Preceded by	Hu Hanmin
Succeeded by	Tan Yankai
Chairman of the National Defense Committee of the Kuomintang
In office 3 March 1937 – 11 August 1937
Preceded by	Chiang Kai-shek
Succeeded by	Chiang Kai-shek
24th Premier of China
In office 28 January 1932 – 1 December 1935
President	Lin Sen
Preceded by	Sun Fo
Succeeded by	Chiang Kai-shek
Chairman of the Military Affairs Commission
In office 3 July 1925 – 16 April 1926
Preceded by	Office established
Succeeded by	Chiang Kai-shek
Chairman of the National Government Committee
In office 1 July 1925 – 23 March 1926
Preceded by	Office established
Succeeded by	Chiang Kai-shek

Personal details
- Born: 4 May 1883 Sanshui, Guangdong, China
- Died: 10 November 1944 (aged 61) Nagoya, Japan
- Party: Kuomintang; Kuomintang-Nanjing
- Spouse: Chen Bijun
- Children: 6

Military service
- Branch/service: Collaborationist Chinese Army
- Years of service: 1940–1944
- Rank: Generalissimo (特級上將)
- Battles/wars: Second Sino-Japanese War

Chinese name
- Traditional Chinese: 汪精衛 / 汪精衞
- Simplified Chinese: 汪精卫
- Hanyu Pinyin: Wāng Jīngwèi
Transcriptions
Standard Mandarin
- Hanyu Pinyin: Wāng Jīngwèi
- Wade–Giles: Wang^{1} Ching^{1}-wei^{4}
Yue: Cantonese
- Yale Romanization: Wōng Jīng-waih
- Jyutping: Wong1 Zing1-wai6

Birth name
- Traditional Chinese: 汪兆銘
- Simplified Chinese: 汪兆铭
- Hanyu Pinyin: Wāng Zhàomíng
Transcriptions
Standard Mandarin
- Hanyu Pinyin: Wāng Zhàomíng
- Wade–Giles: Wang^{1} Chao^{4}-ming^{2}
Yue: Cantonese
- Yale Romanization: Wōng Siuh-míhng
- Jyutping: Wong1 Siu6-ming5
- Wang Jingwei Speech Song of Wang Jingwei regime

Wang Zhaoming (Chinese: 汪兆銘; Wade–Giles: Wang Chao-ming; Japanese: Ō Chōmei; 4 May 1883 – 10 November 1944), widely known by his pen name Wang Jingwei (Chinese: 汪精衛; Wade–Giles: Wang Ching-wei; Japanese: Ō Seiei), was a Chinese politician and poet who became leader of the Reorganized National Government of the Republic of China (RNG), a collaborationist regime with the Empire of Japan during World War II.

Wang attended Hosei University in Japan on a Qing government scholarship, and joined the revolutionary Tongmenghui in Tokyo in 1905. He gained prominence in 1910 for an attempted assassination of the Qing prince regent Zaifeng, for which he was sentenced to life imprisonment but was released after the Wuchang Uprising the following year. Trusted by both sides, he mediated between Yuan Shikai's Beiyang Army and Sun Yat-sen's revolutionary forces, supporting Yuan's presidency to facilitate a peaceful abdication of the Qing court.

In 1912, Wang left for France, where he initiated the Work–Study Movement. Returning to China in 1917, he rejoined Sun's inner circle and in 1925 drafted his political testament. Following Sun's death, Wang became the first president of the Nationalist government and Chiang Kai-shek's principal rival within the Kuomintang (KMT). As Wang adhered to Sun’s policy of cooperation with the Soviet Union and the Chinese Communist Party (CCP), the right-wing Western Hills Group purported to suspend him from the KMT for six months and set up a rival party leadership in Shanghai in 1925.

After losing control of the party and military to Chiang in the Canton Coup, Wang departed for France. He returned in April 1927, when he issued a joint declaration with Chen Duxiu reaffirming KMT–CCP cooperation and led the left-wing Wuhan government in opposition to Chiang's in Nanjing. Wang purged the Communists in the July 15 Incident and reconciled with Nanjing, whereupon both he and Chiang were forced to resign as the New Guangxi clique took control of the reunified government. In late 1929, he joined a series of revolts against Chiang, who had since resumed power, but was defeated in the Central Plains War; Wang fled to British Hong Kong and was expelled from the KMT. He joined an anti-Chiang government in Guangzhou in 1931, but following the Japanese invasion of Manchuria reached an accommodation with Chiang whereby Wang led the government while Chiang commanded the military.

During the Second Sino-Japanese War, Wang initially advocated resistance while pursuing negotiations. Following China's defeat in the First Battle of Hopei, he increasingly favored the peace movement. In December 1938, as the second-ranking leader after Chiang, Wang left China's wartime capital Chongqing for Hanoi and called for a peace settlement with Japan, after which he was expelled from the KMT again. In 1940 Wang established a collaborationist government in Nanjing, administering Japanese-occupied China. Both the KMT and the CCP denounced him as hanjian. Wang died in Nagoya, Japan in 1944.

== Early life and education ==
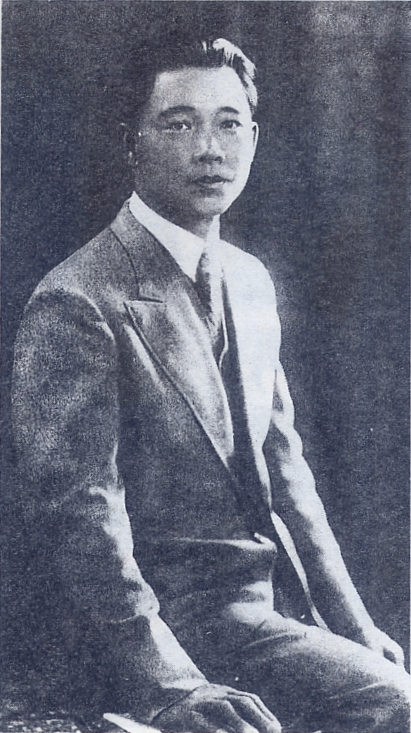
Wang Jingwei in his twenties

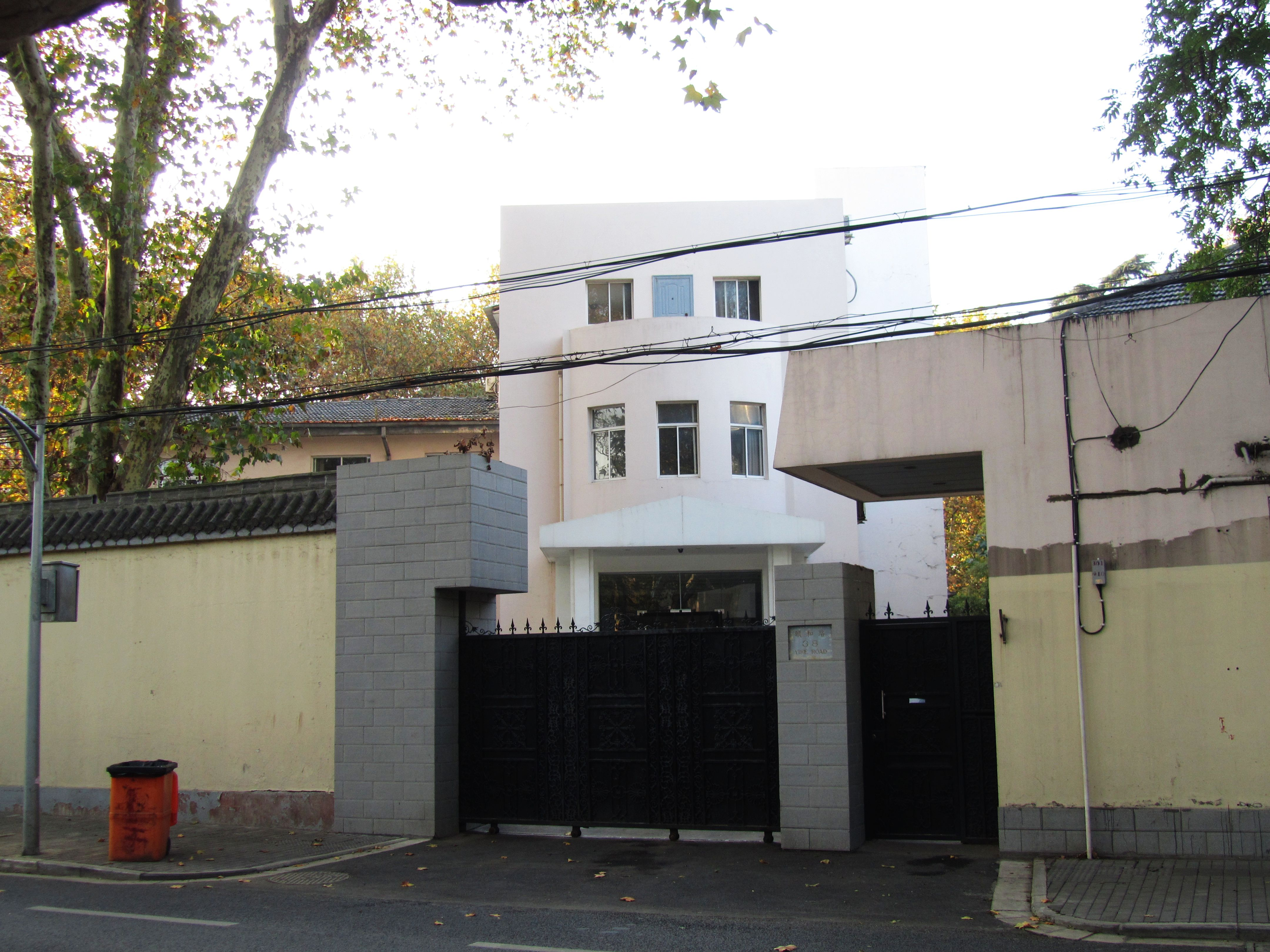
Former residence of Wang Jingwei in Nanjing.

Born in Sanshui, Guangdong, of Zhejiang origin, Wang obtained a xiucai degree by passing the imperial examination at the county-level in 1902, and went to study at Hosei University in Japan on a Qing government scholarship in 1903.

In 1905, Wang first met Sun Yat-sen, the exiled revolutionary leader, and soon joined the Tongmenghui, predecessor of the Kuomintang, in Tokyo. He gained attention as a polemicist for the Tongmenghui organ People's News, notably in his debates with Liang Qichao, who advocated constitutional monarchy. His sobriquet "Wang Jingwei," initially a pen name for the newspaper, was adopted in 1905 and named after the mythical jingwei bird that attempts to fill the ocean with twigs and pebbles.

As a young man, Wang came to blame the Qing dynasty for holding China back, and making it too weak to fight off exploitation by Western imperialist powers. In Japan, he cut off his queue and embraced theories of democracy and liberalism. Wang was among the Chinese nationalists in Japan who were influenced by Russian anarchism, and published a number of articles in journals edited by Zhang Renjie, Wu Zhihui, and a group of Chinese anarchists in Paris.

Japan's victory in the Russo-Japanese War impressed Wang, and influenced his view of nationalism as an ideology that could unite a country around the idea of self-strengthening.

== Early career ==
In the years leading up to the Xinhai Revolution in 1911, Wang was active in opposing the Qing government. During this period he emerged as an excellent public speaker and a staunch advocate of Chinese nationalism.

Wang was part of a Tongmenghui cell which attempted to assassinate the regent, Prince Chun. Wang and Chen Bijun, an admirer of Wang's revolutionary ambitions, were betrothed and informally married shortly before the assassination attempt. The bomb that Wang and his cell planted was discovered, and Wang and two others who planned the assassination were arrested two weeks later. Wang readily admitted his guilt at trial and was not repentant. He was sentenced to life imprisonment.

A number of factors may have contributed to Wang's receiving a life sentence instead of being executed. Shanqi, Prince Su, who was in charge of the Beijing police and presided over the interrogation of Wang, was believed to have been moved by Wang's confession. In his view, leniency would show the government's magnanimity and its commitment to reform. Additionally, Shanqi's advisor Cheng Jiacheng was an undercover Tongmenghui agent and there were other sympathetic officials. Finally, Tongmenghui leaders threatened reprisals if Wang were executed, and these threats may have had an intimidating effect on government officials.

Wang remained in prison for a year, during which he was well treated by Prince Su, who often engaged him in discussions of politics and poetry, an experience that softened Wang's violently revolutionary ardour. Following the Wuchang Uprising, he was released as a national hero; accounts differ as to whether this was part of a general amnesty the Qing court extended to placate the revolutionaries, or specifically arranged by Yuan Shikai, a capable general newly appointed as imperial premier who sought to use Wang as an intermediary in negotiations with the revolutionary forces. A book of poems written by Wang during his incarceration was published after his release and became widely popular.

Amid the fall of the empire, Wang found himself courted by rival factions. He became the revolutionaries' point man with Yuan, and became a sworn brother of Yuan's son, Keding. Wang co-founded a lobby group with Yang Du, a friend from their shared years at Hosei University, with the two men presenting themselves as representatives of the revolutionary and constitutionalist camps respectively. They called for an immediate ceasefire, the convening of a provisional national assembly, and a peaceful resolution of the monarchy-versus-republic question, but the proposal was rejected by both the Qing court and the revolutionaries. The group was dissolved within a month.

Wang subsequently mediated negotiations between the Beiyang Army led by Yuan Shikai and the much weaker revolutionary forces led by Sun Yat-sen. Reflecting a broad consensus among the revolutionaries, including Sun himself, Wang supported Yuan’s presidency in order to secure the Qing court’s abdication and facilitate a peaceful transfer of power.

After the Xinhai Revolution, Wang pledged to hold no government office as a demonstration of his revolutionary and altruistic ideals, declining Yuan's offers of the vice presidency and secretary-generalship of the presidential office, as well as Sun's offer of the Guangdong governorship. When Wang's Hosei classmate Song Jiaoren was assassinated shortly after leading the KMT to a decisive victory in China's first parliamentary election, the killing was widely attributed to Yuan, and tensions between Yuan and Sun reignited. Wang advocated for political compromise and peaceful settlement to no avail. When Sun's Second Revolution against Yuan broke out, Wang lent his vocal support but felt disillusioned by politics and war.

After Yuan quickly suppressed the Second Revolution, Wang left for France with his wife, funded by Yuan and Wang's wealthy father-in-law. He befriended his neighbor Cai Yuanpei in France, and refused Yuan's invitations to return home with promises of political reward. He, though, accepted Yuan's financial gift, which he used to launch Xuefeng magazine with Cai. Wang briefly returned to China with his wife to take part in the National Protection War against Yuan. In 1917, Wang ended his three-year stay in France after Cai, now president of Peking University, invited him to head the Chinese department. Upon returning to China, however, Wang immediately became involved in politics and joined Sun Yat-sen’s Constitutional Protection Movement, abandoning his planned scholarly career.

In 1919, Wang was appointed as a delegate by the Constitutional Protection junta, as opposed to the delegation of the internationally recognized Beiyang government, to attend the post-World War I Paris Peace Conference. Honoring his pledge to decline official positions, he did not accept the appointment but attended the conference as an observer nonetheless. Witnessing China receive no better treatment than a defeated power despite its status as a victorious ally, Wang was outraged by the diplomatic fiasco and the European powers’ disregard for Chinese interests at the conference, which convinced him to abandon his deliberate detachment from practical politics.

In 1921, when Sun Yat-sen assumed the presidency of the Guangzhou government of the ROC that succeeded the Constitutional Protection junta, Wang became Sun's minister of education, the first official office of his career. He also held several other posts, including as Sun’s Chinese secretary and speechwriter. In late 1924, he was one of the few members of Sun's inner circle to accompany him on trips outside of KMT-held territory to Beijing, months before Sun's death. He drafted Sun's political and personal testaments, to the KMT and to his family respectively, before Sun's death in March 1925.

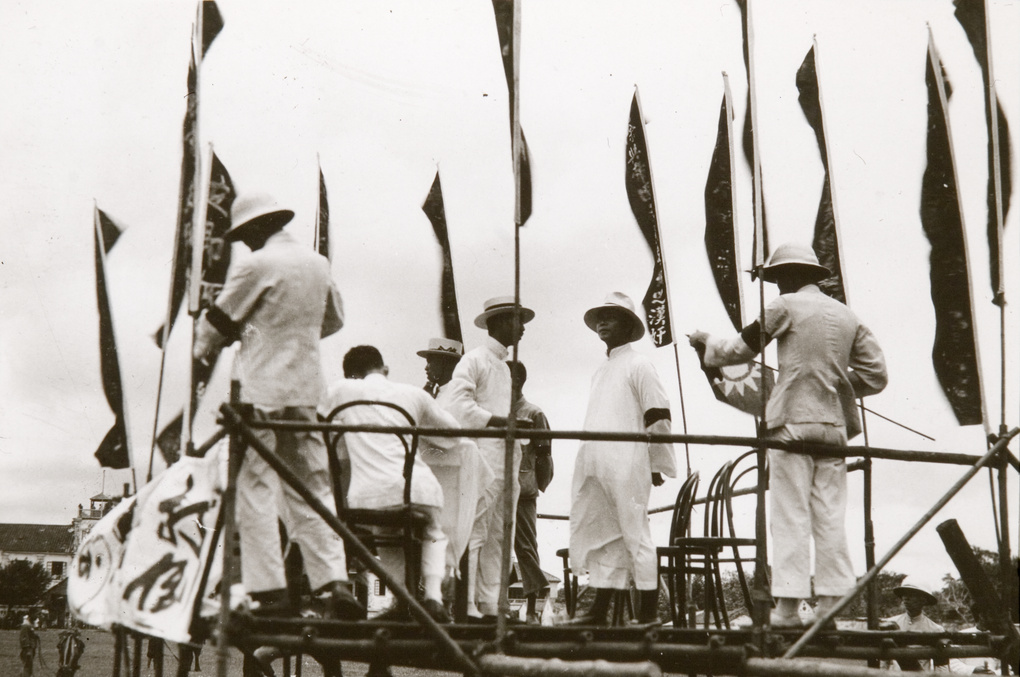
Wang Jingwei addressing the students before a demonstration in Shakee in June 1925 in Guangzhou

== Mid-career ==
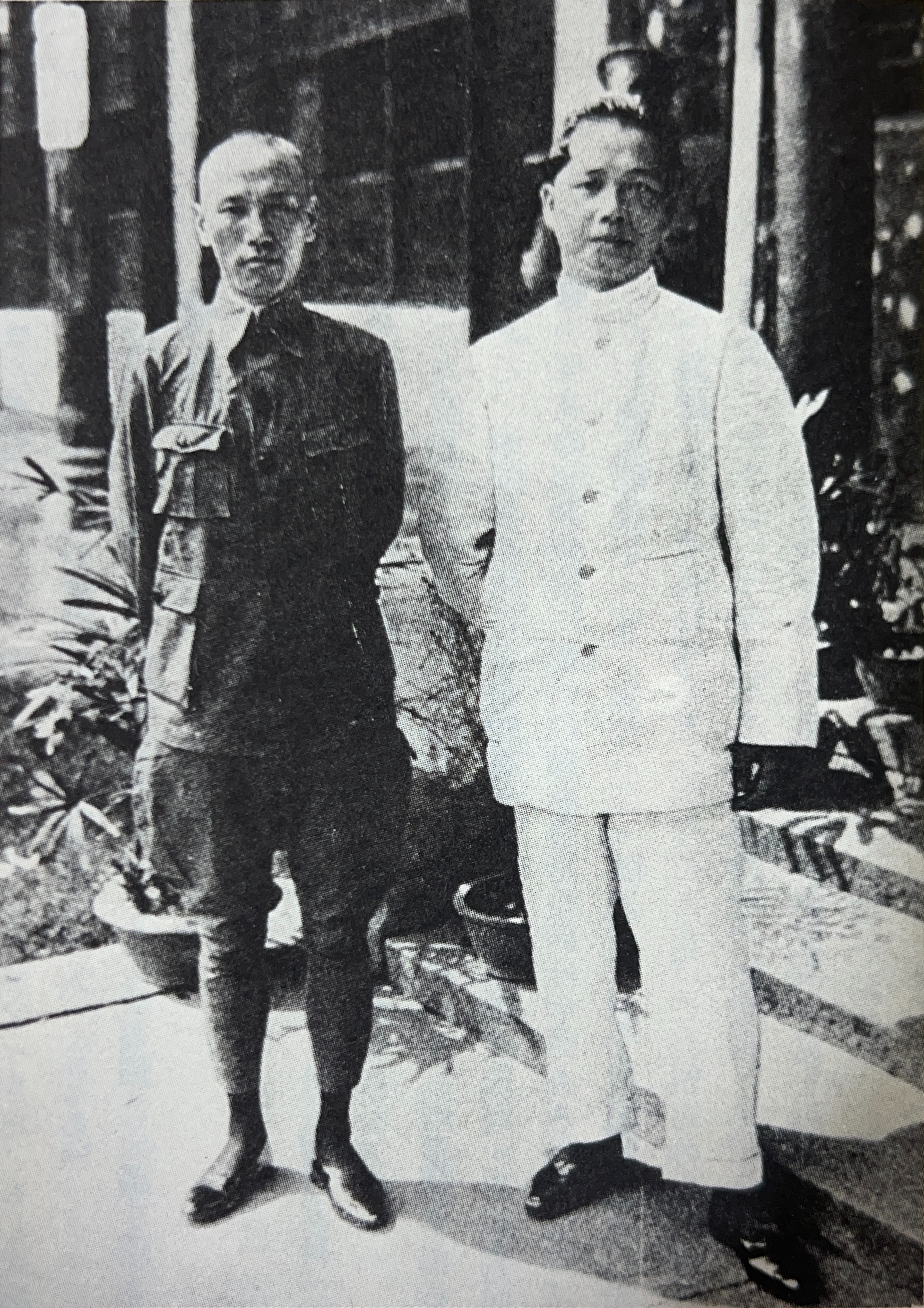
Wang Jingwei and Chiang Kai-Shek in 1927

=== Leader of the Guangzhou Government ===
After Sun's death in 1925, Wang, considered Sun's successor as leader of the KMT, became the first president of the Nationalist government, which at the time controlled only Guangdong province in opposition to the internationally recognized Beiyang Government that held sway over much of the rest of China. At this time, Wang's view was that the KMT should be the lead party in a democratic coalition based on constitutionalism and that it should guide mass movements to change China's social structure. Wang also adhered to Sun's policy of collaborating with Soviet Union, such as with advisors Nikolay Kuybyshev and Mikhail Borodin, as well as accommodating Chinese Communist Party. In October 1925, Wang appointed a number of CCP members to prominent positions within the KMT, including Mao Zedong, who assumed Wang's concurrent post as head of the KMT's Publicity Department.

Wang, leader of the KMT left wing, Chiang Kai-shek, the centre, and Hu Hanmin, the right, emerged as the three principal contenders for power within the KMT. Following the Canton Coup, which some historians believe was a false flag incident orchestrated by the Sun Yat-senism Study Society, a radical right-wing faction within the KMT, Wang lost control of the party and military to Chiang. He resigned and left for France with his family.

=== Leader of the Wuhan Government ===
Following the Northern Expedition, the Nationalist government relocated from Guangzhou to Wuhan, which it declared as its temporary capital. In April 1927, Wang travelled back to China via the Soviet Union, where he met Joseph Stalin. Passing through Shanghai, Wang issued a joint declaration with Chen Duxiu reaffirming his commitment to KMT–CCP cooperation, before proceeding to lead the left-wing Nationalist government in Wuhan. As soon as Wang arrived in Wuhan, Chiang purged CCP in the Shanghai massacre and then established a rival right-wing government in Nanjing. The separation between the governments of Wang and Chiang is known as the "Nanjing-Wuhan Split" (traditional Chinese: 寧漢分裂; simplified Chinese: 宁汉分裂; pinyin: Nínghàn Fenlìe).

In May 1927, the Comintern issued a directive instructing the CCP to strengthen its position within the Wuhan government by organizing a peasant army and establishing a military tribunal to try Chiang over the Shanghai massacre. Mikhail Borodin and Chen Duxiu considered the directive unrealistic. Comintern agent Manabendra Nath Roy, however, showed the directive to Wang, who reacted with alarm, precipitating the July 15 Incident in which Wang followed Chiang's lead in purging the Communists. In a subsequent interview with The New York Times, Wang explained his split with the Communists:

Sun Yat-sen, as you know, was greatly influenced by the American radical Henry George, but he was never a Communist. His economic program, which is ours, means three things: Henry George's method of assessing land, definite laws against monopoly under private ownership, and Government ownership of large public utilities. We propose to realize this program without violence and without confiscation.

As Wang became the last of three KMT leaders to break with the Communists, Nanjing, Wuhan, and Shanghai reached a compromise and established the Central Special Committee as the supreme decision-making body for party and political affairs, ending the period of fragmentation that had seen three separate KMT central party organs and two rival central governments coexist since 1926. However, the New Guangxi clique exploited the intra-party tensions to seize effective control of the Committee. Both Chiang Kai-shek and Wang were edged out before the formal reunification was completed, and Wang departed for France again at the end of 1927.

=== Collaboration with Anti-Chiang Powers ===
In late 1928, when Wang was in France, KMT left-wing figures such as Chen Gongbo and Gu Mengyu founded the Reorganization Group in Shanghai, recognizing Wang as their de facto leader in absentia. In late 1929, following Zhang Fakui's uprising against Chiang and his appeal for Wang's return, Wang came back to China. In 1930, Wang allied with Feng Yuxiang, Yan Xishan, and Li Zongren to form a government based in Taiyuan and then Peiping in opposition to Chiang, but their coalition was defeated in the Central Plains War. Wang then fled to British Hong Kong, where the Reorganization Group was dissolved. In 1931, Wang joined an anti-Chiang government in Guangzhou, composed primarily of the defeated powers in the Central Plains War.

=== Premiership of the Chiang Government ===
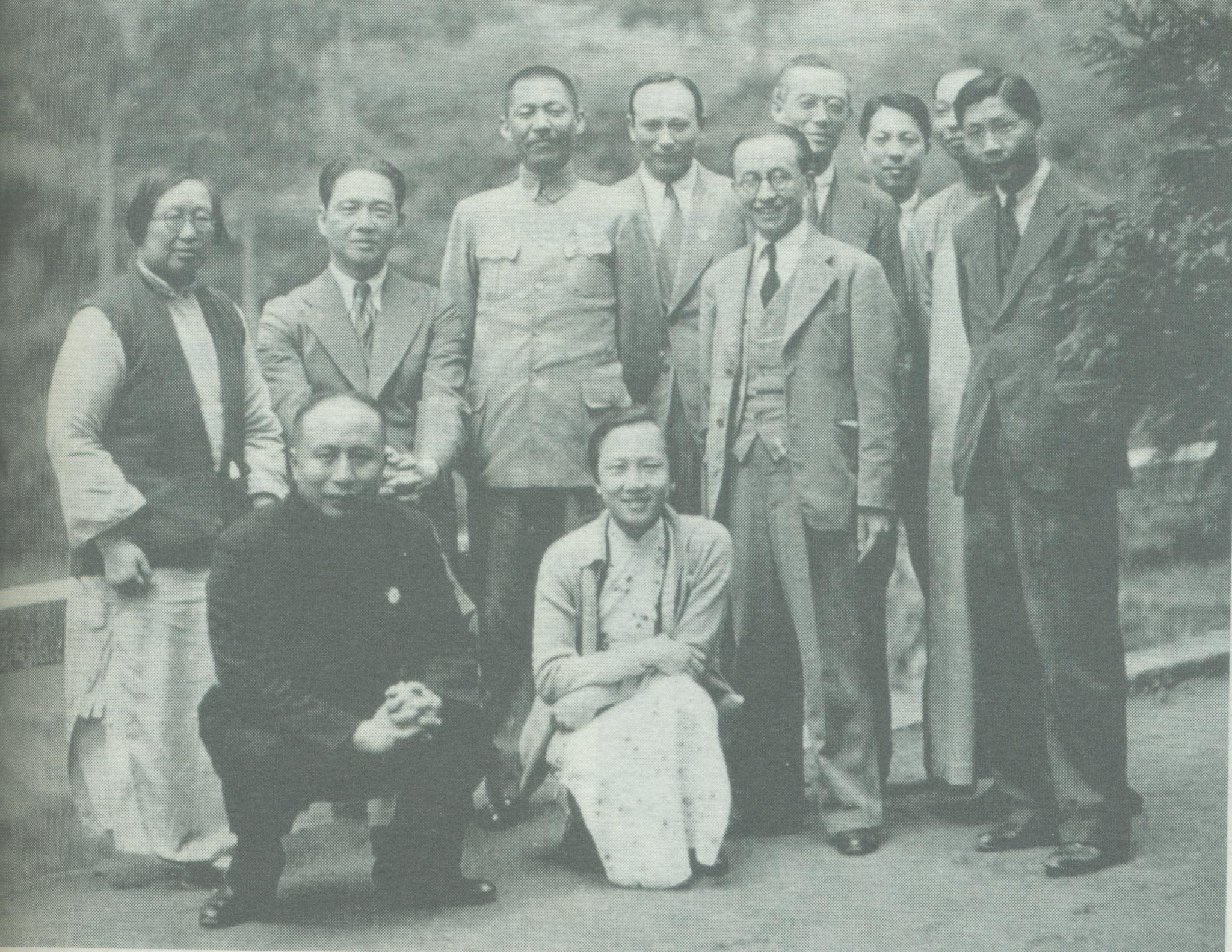
Wang Jingwei (second from left) and Chen Bijun (far left) in British Malaya, 1935

Following the Mukden Incident, Chiang and Wang set aside their intra-party rivalry and reached an uneasy accommodation, whereby Wang served as premier while Chiang commanded the military. During his premiership of the Nanjing government, Wang initially advocated resistance during the Shanghai War of 1932, but as the conflict dragged on, he presided with Chiang's endorsement over settlement negotiations with Japan, drawing criticism for perceived appeasement. From July 1932, Wang repeatedly urged Zhang Xueliang to resist Japanese incursions into Rehe, and in August threatened resignation over the general's policy of non-resistance, which admittedly stemmed from the profound military imbalance between the Northeastern Army and Japanese forces.

Wang proceeded to resign in August and departed for Europe on the stated grounds of medical leave. On the recommendation of his family physician, Kurt Noll (1900–1955) of Giessen, Wang spent much of his leave at clinics and spas in Germany and Austria.

Following Zhang's defeat in the Battle of Rehe, Zhang resigned and left for Europe as well, whereupon Wang returned to the premiership in March 1933. His confidence in military resistance was soon shaken, however, by China's disastrous defeat in the First Battle of Hopei, where Japanese firepower and equipment far outmatched Chinese forces. As head of government, Wang attracted significant criticism over the Tanggu Truce, which many viewed as a humiliating capitulation to Japan.

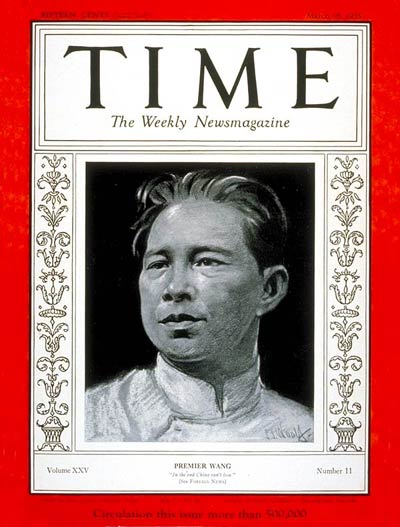
Wang Jingwei on a 1935 cover of Time magazine

While opposed to any effort to subordinate China to Japan, Wang viewed the Soviet Union, Britain, and the United States as equal if not greater dangers to China, insisting that China had to defeat Japan solely through its own efforts if it were to preserve its independence. At the same time, Wang's belief that China was too economically backward to prevail against a Japan that had been aggressively modernising since the Meiji Restoration of 1868 made him an advocate of avoiding war and negotiating an agreement that would safeguard Chinese sovereignty. Chiang, by contrast, believed that if his modernisation programme were given sufficient time, China would win the coming war; and if war came before that programme was complete, he was prepared to ally with any foreign power to defeat Japan, including the Soviet Union. Though a hardline anti-Communist, Chiang was also a self-proclaimed realist willing to countenance such an alliance if necessary. In the short term, Wang and Chiang agreed on the policy of "first internal pacification, then external resistance," but their long-term outlooks diverged: Wang favoured accommodation with Japan, while Chiang sought only to buy time to prepare China for the inevitable war.

In 1934, as Chiang launched the New Life Movement, where law enforcement police sometimes inspected people's homes for cleanliness, Wang sought to persuade Chiang to rely less on coercive measures, contending, "Morality sets the highest standards, but the law should only enforce the minimum standard." Chiang partially accepted this perspective, announcing a modification to the movement's implementation whereby the state would less directly intervene in common people's homes and bodies, and would focus more on government employees, soldiers, and students before expanding to the common people more gradually.

In November 1935, Wang was seriously wounded in an assassination attempt at a group photograph session; the gunman, Sun Fengming, cited Wang's appeasement policy toward Japan as justification, a popular opinion following Wang's role in the truce negotiations after the Shanghai War of 1932 and the Tanggu Truce. Zhang Xueliang, who along with Zhang Puquan had subdued Sun on the spot and then interrogated the assassin, instead claimed that the real plotter was Liu Luyin, who hired the assassin through Wang Yaqiao, as Liu sought to eliminate the Guangdong faction in the government, including Wang, T. V. Soong, Yang Changqing, and Yang Yongtai.

Wang took a three-month medical leave and, following treatment in Hong Kong, resumed office in January 1936. The same year, Wang clashed with Chiang over foreign policy. In a role reversal, the left-wing "progressive" Wang argued for accepting the German-Japanese offer of having China sign the Anti-Comintern Pact while the right-wing "reactionary" Chiang wanted a rapprochement with the Soviet Union. During the 1936 Xi'an Incident, in which Chiang was seized by Zhang Xueliang, Wang favored sending a "punitive expedition" to attack Zhang. Chiang's wife, Soong Mei-ling, and brother-in-law, T. V. Soong, feared that such an action would lead to Chiang's death and his replacement by Wang, so they opposed the action.

In 1937, Wang accompanied the Nationalist government in its retreat to Chongqing, China's wartime capital. As Chinese forces suffered a succession of defeats, Wang continued to advocate a negotiated peace, his growing defeatism increasingly at odds with Chiang's position and a source of division within the KMT.

== Later career ==
=== Breakaway from Chongqing ===
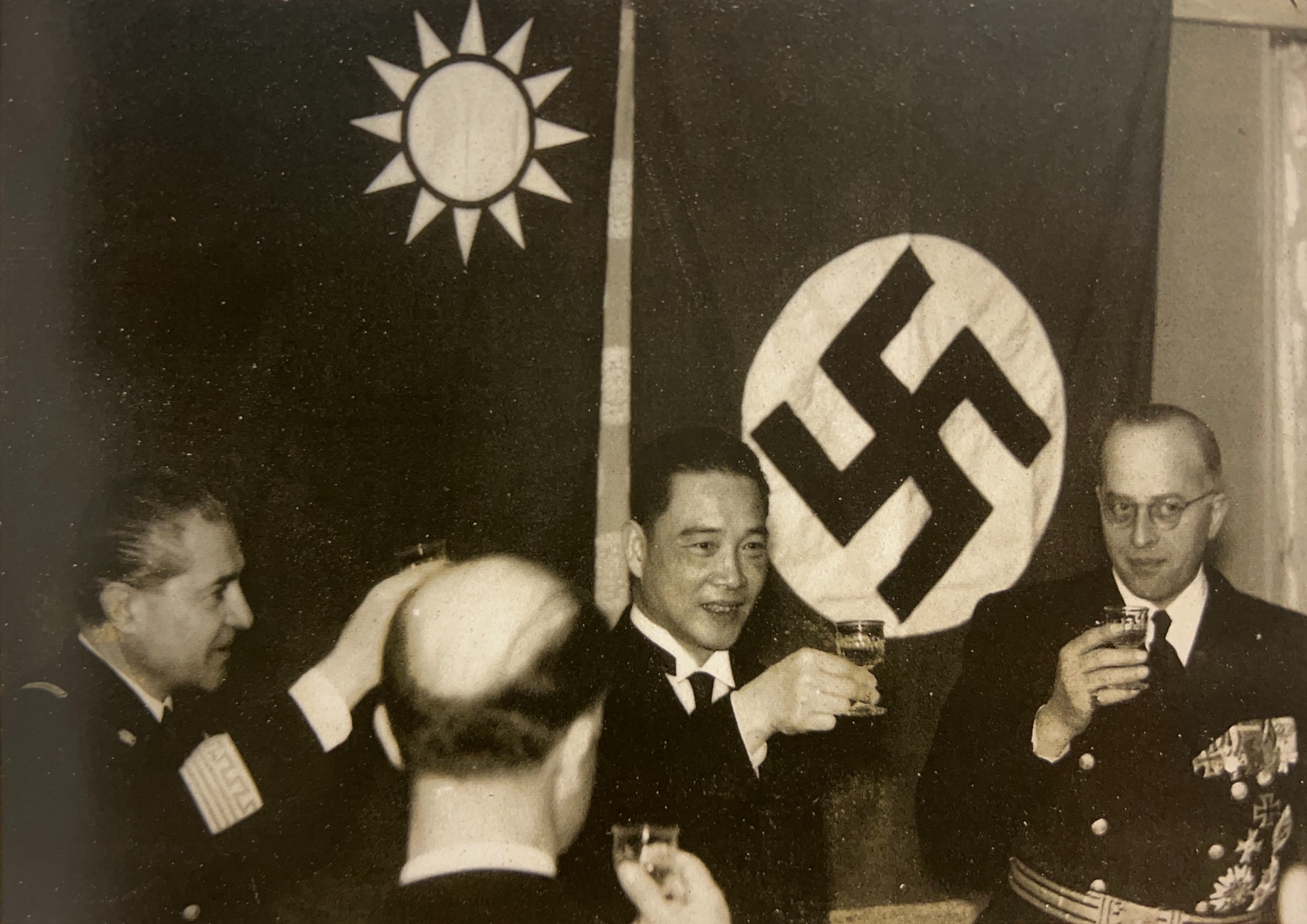
Wang receiving German diplomats while serving as the head of state in 1941

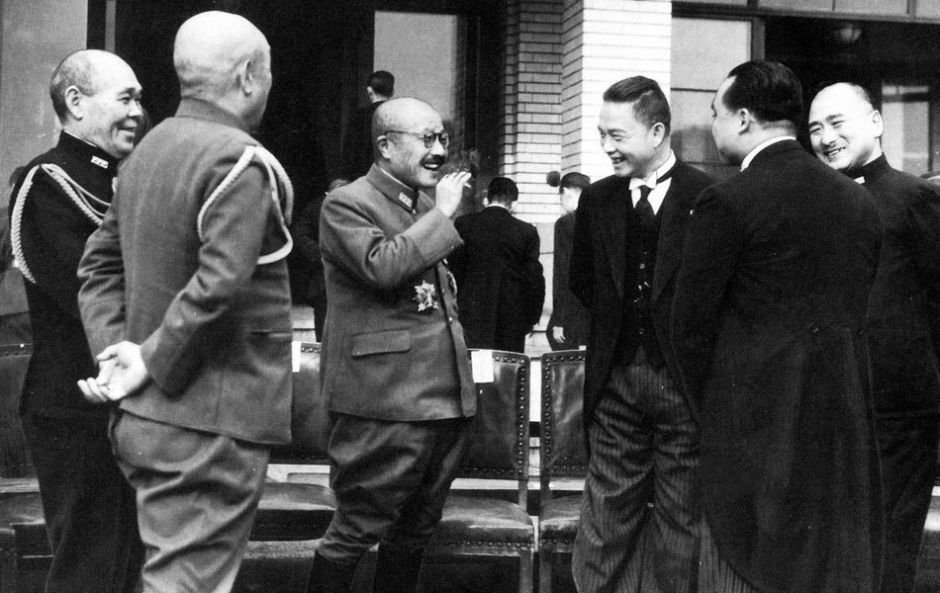
Hideki Tojo and Wang Jingwei meet in 1942

From 1937 to 1938, Wang conducted a series of secret negotiations with Konoe Fumimaro, who approached him in an effort to split the Chinese leadership and agreed in principle to a conditional Japanese troop withdrawal within two years. In December 1938, as the second-ranking leader of the Nationalist government and KMT to Chiang, Wang left Chongqing for Hanoi via Kunming, with the assistance of the Yunnan warlord Long Yun.

On 22 December, Konoe issued a public statement on China policy, but under pressure from the hawkish military, the statement omitted the two-year withdrawal commitment. Despite his disappointment, Wang proceeded to issue a responding statement per their coordinated schedule of public statements in the secret agreement, declaring his support for a negotiated settlement with Japan. He was subsequently expelled from the KMT and placed on a wanted list by the Chongqing government.

Wang had originally planned to establish a rival government in southwestern China, relying on anti-Chiang warlords to provide a territorial base. However, Konoe's cabinet suddenly resigned in January 1939, and the warlords Wang had counted on, including Long Yun, Zhang Fakui, and He Jian, did not respond as expected, leaving him stranded in Hanoi without political or military backing.

In February 1939, Chiang dispatched emissary Gu Zhengding to Hanoi, offering Wang three passports and funds, urging him to leave for Europe. Two were diplomatic passports, issued to Chen Bijun and Wang's secretary Zeng Zhongming; the third was an ordinary passport for Wang himself, as Chiang considered him stripped of party membership and public office and therefore ineligible for diplomatic travel documents. Wang indignantly demanded that all three be of the same type and the dispute dragged on until March. Wang also conveyed to Chiang that he had not abandoned his commitment to a negotiated peace and would return to China if circumstances required. Wang later attributed this intransigence as a factor that provoked the KMT assassination attempt in Hanoi, which mistakenly killed Zeng Zhongming, one of Wang's closest associates.

With his break with Chiang now irreparable and British Hong Kong unwilling to offer protection, the Japanese government proactively sent representatives to Hanoi and offered Wang safe passage. Wang chose to proceed to then Japanese occupied Shanghai, where he entered into negotiations over the formation of a new government.

=== Wang Jingwei Regime ===
On 30 March 1940, Wang became head of the Reorganized National Government of the Republic of China (RNG), commonly known as the Wang Jingwei regime. Established at Nanjing, the Chinese capital which had fallen to Japan, the RNG nominally governed Japanese-occupied China excluding Manchuria, where Japan had already installed the separate Manchukuo puppet state.

The regime was a deliberate carbon copy of the institutional structure of the ROC government and KMT to assert its claim as the legitimate representative of China. From 30 March 1940 to 28 November 1940, the RNG also nominally recognized Lin Sen, then ROC president in Chongqing, as its own president. Lin refused to acknowledge this and denounced Wang. The RNG adopted the same blue sky and white sun flag of the ROC, though Japan imposed its use alongside a slogan banner reading "peace, anti-communism, and national reconstruction" (和平反共建國) to avoid friendly fire on the battlefield.

On 15 June 1940, Wang published an article entitled "Chiang Kai-shek's 'Magnet War'", in which he articulated his justification for the peace movement. Wang summarized his position in three propositions, followed by an extended critique of Chiang's wartime strategy:

1. China and Japan ought properly to be friends, not enemies.
2. If circumstances had made them enemies, one must strive at all times to restore friendship; once restored, it must never again be abandoned.
3. The Konoe Statements had already provided such a path, yet Chiang continued to advocate his "Magnet War" strategy, which held that China, vast in territory and population, could entangle the Japanese army in a prolonged struggle through protracted war, scorched-earth tactics, and guerrilla warfare, occupying points and lines but never the whole.

Wang contended that Chiang's strategy depended entirely on two unreliable hopes — international assistance and Japan's economic collapse — and that prolonged war would destroy China far more thoroughly than Japan, since unlike the Song or Ming, modern China lacked the resilience to recover from collapse. He concluded with the metaphor of "swallowing arsenic to poison a tiger": the strategy would kill China before it harmed Japan.

In November 1940, the RNG signed the "Sino-Japanese Treaty", a document that has been compared with Japan's Twenty-One Demands for its broad political, military, and economic concessions. In June 1941, Wang gave a public radio address from Tokyo in which he praised Japan and affirmed China's submission to it while criticizing the Kuomintang government, and pledged to work with the Empire of Japan to resist Communism and Western imperialism.

On 1 July 1941, Germany and Italy recognized Wang's government. The Axis states of Romania, Bulgaria, Slovakia, and Croatia followed suit on the same day.

In 1943, Wang took advantage of Japan’s overstretch in the Pacific War to obtain greater self-rule for his government. On 9 January 1943, in an alignment with Japan, the RNG declared war on Britain and the United States, though it never committed any troops. Within the hour, Japan signed an agreement with the RNG transferring back the foreign concessions in Japanese-occupied territories and abolishing extraterritoriality. On 30 March, the RNG took over the Japanese concessions in Hangzhou, Suzhou, Hankou, and Tianjin; on 28 May, the Kulangsu International Settlement in Xiamen; on 5 June, the French concessions in Tianjin, Hankou, and Guangzhou; and in July, the Italian concessions in Tianjin and Shanghai.

Meanwhile, in early 1943, the RNG suspended its anti-communist propaganda, including removing the yellow banner reading "peace, anti-communism, and national reconstruction" from its flag, as part of an effort to co-opt the CCP against Chiang's ROC. In April, Wang met CCP agent Pan Hannian in Nanjing.

Wang died in Japan on 10 November 1944 and was succeeded by Chen Gongbo. Following Japan's surrender, the RNG dissolved on 16 August 1945.

== Death ==
In March 1944, Wang left for Japan to undergo medical treatment for the wound left by an assassination attempt in 1935. He died at the Nagoya Imperial University Hospital on 10 November 1944, less than a year before Japan's surrender to the Allies. A testament attributed to Wang, published by Jin Xiongbai, a former official at the RNG, in the 1960s in Hong Kong, purports to record Wang's deathbed dictation to Chen Bijun, with a request that it not be published until twenty years after his death; its authenticity remains disputed. In it, Wang lamented that the threat of China's total subjugation left him no alternative but to cooperate with Japan at the darkest hour, expressed hope at the turning of the tide in the Pacific War as China joined the Allied powers, and declared his confidence in Japan's eventual defeat. He also instructed: "Whatever the future may hold for our nation, my comrades must uphold the principle that the party shall remain united and the country shall not be divided; none may pursue private interests by fomenting separatism."

Wang's death was not announced until 12 November 1944, after commemorative events for Sun Yat-sen's birthday had concluded in China. On 14 November, the RNG issued a state funeral decree. On 18 November, the Ministry of Propaganda (MoP) announced that the Central Political Council had ratified the decree in accordance with Wang's dying wish to "be buried in Guangdong alongside my fallen revolutionary comrades," and a burial site had been selected at the foot of White Cloud Mountain, Guangzhou; Wang would be temporarily interred at Plum Blossom Hill, next to the Sun Yat-sen Mausoleum on the Purple Mountain, Nanjing, with a full state funeral to follow once "general peace was restored."

The MoP announcement, penned by Lin Bosheng, noted that Wang had in life opposed a state funeral, which he regarded as a feudal imperial custom. In their early years, Wang and Chen Bijun, together with comrades and friends including Zeng Xing and Fang Junying, pledged to be buried together so that in death they might remain united, jointly purchasing a burial land at the White Cloud Mountain. Wang wished for a few plum trees by the grave and a tombstone inscribed only "Tomb of Wang Jingwei." Fang Junying died by suicide in 1923; in the spring of 1926, Wang arranged her burial on the White Cloud Mountain, and his second son Wenjing, who had died shortly after birth in Chicago, was interred beside her. In 1937, amid the ROC government's discussions of state funeral arrangements following the death of Zhu Peide, Wang was moved to commit his wishes to writing, entrusting a testament to his loved ones. After Chen Bijun reported these circumstances, the Central Political Council of the RNG resolved to honor both the decree and Wang's wishes by keeping the ceremony in Nanjing simple and unobtrusive.

On 23 November 1944, Wang was interred on Plum Blossom Hill; the construction of the tomb was left incomplete when Japan announced its surrender the following year. In January 1946, after Chiang retook Nanjing, he ordered the tomb demolished, Wang's body exhumed and cremated together with the coffin. In 1947, a pavilion was constructed under the orders of Sun Fo on the site of the former tomb.

In 1988, a memorial tomb was erected at Sotai-in Temple, Tokyo, within which a fragment salvaged from the destroyed Nanjing tomb was interred. The inscription eulogizes Wang as "a patriot, a distinguished disciple of Sun Yat-sen, and a great figure of East Asia." In 1994, a kneeling statue of Wang was installed at the summit of Plum Flower Mountain. After visitors repeatedly defaced the statute, it was removed in 1997.

== Poetry ==
In 1903, Wang and his elder brother passed the prefectural examinations in Guangdong under Zhu Zumou, a renowned late Qing poet serving as educational commissioner, and were awarded the shengyuan degree. By convention, successful candidates addressed their presiding examiner as "teacher," and Wang's relationship with Zhu would bring him prestigious connections in traditionalist literary circles.

In 1912, before he left for France, Wang joined the South Society, a literary club founded in Suzhou in 1909 by Tongmenghui members. In 1931 and 1932, Wang serialized a literary column about South Society in the Hong Kong-based South China Daily, under the nom de plume of Man Zhao (Chinese: 曼昭; pinyin: Mànzhāo; Wade–Giles: Man-chao), which has been generally accepted to be Wang given the publication of his manuscripts in the 2020s.

As a poet, Wang was critically acclaimed by his contemporaries, among them Qian Zhongshu, Chen Yinke, Zhang Bojun and Chen Yan. Swimming against the tide of the modern poetry written in vernacular Chinese of his time, Wang is regarded as one of the last great poets in the classical Chinese tradition. His early poetry is characterized by revolutionary passion and moral fortitude; his middle-period work turns to quieter, contemplative verse on nature and everyday life; while his late poetry grows increasingly dense, desolate, and elegiac, read by some scholars as a palimpsest of an often unfathomable inner life in his collaborationist years. His literary legacy was largely buried and forgotten after his death. In 2012, the republication of his collected poems in Hong Kong, coupled with the rediscovery and reassessment of his work by scholars such as Chia-ying Yeh and Yu Ying-shih, brought renewed interest and readership.

His best-known poem, composed at the age of 27 before his literary reputation was eclipsed by his political career, is a set of verse quatrains written upon his capture following the failed assassination attempt on Prince Chun of the Qing dynasty:

被逮口占

啣石成癡絕
滄波萬里愁
孤飛終不倦
羞逐海鷗浮

姹紫嫣紅色
從知渲染難
他時好花發
認取血痕斑

慷慨歌燕市
從容作楚囚
引刀成一快
不負少年頭

留得心魂在
殘軀付劫灰
青燐光不滅
夜夜照燕臺

— 汪精衛 (1914)
Translation:
Orally Composed upon Being Captured

Carrying pebbles in its beak—what extreme folly!
Over ten thousand miles of dark waves spreads its sorrow.
Its tireless wings empower a solitary flight,
Ashamed to follow the seagulls or float with the tide.

Shades of rich purple and of crimson scarlet—
These bright colors, I know, are hard to dye.
One day when the tender blossoms bloom,
Please recognize on them stains of my blood.

With heroic abandon I sing in the market of Yan;
At utmost ease I become a prisoner from Chu.
The blade drawn turns into a sharp thrill,
That truly deserves this fine young head!

I will preserve only my heart, my soul,
And let the maimed body incinerate in the flames of kalpa.
Its blue ghost-light will never die—
Night after night, it shines upon the Terrace of Yan.

— Wang Jingwei (1914)

Some accounts state that, when Chiang ordered Wang's tomb demolished in 1945, a collection of poems was found in the coffin, including a final piece believed to have been composed shortly before Wang's death:

自嘲

心宇將滅萬事休
天涯無處不怨尤
縱有先輩嘗炎涼
諒無後人續春秋

Translation:
Self-Mockery

As the chamber of the heart falls dark, all things come to rest;
Nowhere at the world’s edge is there not grievance and reproach.
Though those before have known the turns of heat and cold,
Surely none will come after to carry on this Spring and Autumn.

== Legacy ==
=== Assessment ===
Wang is one of the most controversial figures in Chinese history. For his role in the Second Sino-Japanese War, Wang has been denounced as a hanjian by both the KMT and the CCP, one of the few points on which their often divergent historiographies have agreed. Wang's name has become a byword for "traitor" or "treason" in the Chinese world, much like that of Vidkun Quisling in Norway or Benedict Arnold in the United States.

Evidence suggests that Wang's regime maintained contact with both the KMT and the CCP in unoccupied China, though the extent of such collaboration remains unclear. The theory that Wang and Chiang secretly coordinated to hedge China's strategic position between the Axis and the Allied powers has circulated since their public, if not staged, split. Feng Yuxiang, who argued that Chiang sanctioned Wang's defection, cited Wang's smooth departure from Chongqing at a time when wartime movement was heavily regulated, with both the Juntong in Chongqing and Long Yun in Kunming informing Chiang about Wang's movement. The Jungtong's curiously missed Hanoi assassination attempt also raises questions: the KMT's official account holds that Wang had unexpectedly switched rooms with his secretary Zeng Zhongming that night, causing the assassins to kill the wrong man, but Wang's children present at the scene denied that any room switch had taken place. Senior figures in Wang's government, including Chen Gongbo, Zhou Fohai, and Ding Mocun, maintained contact or actively cooperated with Chongqing, while a series of prominent prisoners of war, from Wu Kaixian to Fang Xianjue, managed to "flee back" to Chongqing, a pattern that the CCP cited as evidence of Chiang's collaboration with the enemy.

In early 1943, the yellow banner reading "peace, anti-communism, and national reconstruction" was removed from the RNG's flag. In April, Wang met with CCP agent Pan Hannian in what became one of the most sensitive episodes in CCP history; the meeting's purpose, content, and whether it had been sanctioned by Mao Zedong remain debated. According to declassified records held by the Academia Historica, the RNG and the CCP exchanged emissaries between Nanjing and Yan'an throughout 1943, reaching an understanding on the cession of northwestern territories to the CCP in the event of a Japanese victory. Frederic Wakeman suggested that, given Li Shiqun's sustained intelligence flow to Pan Hannian, Wang's collaboration with the CCP may have run considerably deeper than the public record reflects.

Since the 2000s, a growing body of scholarship has sought to reassess Wang's legacy, casting him not as a self-serving traitor but as a tragic figure who acted under genuine conviction amid impossible circumstances. Historical studies have shed light on his efforts to restore order, revive the economy, and rebuild education in occupied China, enabling students such as Jiang Zemin to attend university. He is also acknowledged for prohibiting his forces from engaging Chiang's anti-Japanese army; for treating Chinese prisoners of war transferred to his custody by Japan humanely; and for shielding civilians from wartime violence and the forced conscription typically imposed in Japan's colonial territories.

=== Estate ===
Following Chiang's resumption of Nanjing in 1945, Wang's estate was seized and his personal collections inventoried and confiscated. The collections, noted for their refined taste and wide-ranging interests, comprised over 400 books — including his own compiled works alongside volumes spanning literature, history, and the arts in multiple languages — and over 370 works of calligraphy, paintings, seal carvings, and ink rubbings; these were transferred to the National Central Library, now mostly held at the Nanjing Library. Wang also held some 350 objets d'art, among them vases, porcelain, and silverware, mostly gifts from political associates and foreign governments, particularly Japan; these were transferred to the National Central Museum, and are now housed at the National Palace Museum in Taipei. Since the 2000s, Wang's calligraphy has attracted considerable interest on the art auction market.

In 2010, Wang's eldest daughter Wang Wenxing and her husband Ho Mang Hang established the Wang Jingwei Irrevocable Trust, an independent nonprofit educational organization based in the United States. The trust maintains a comprehensive archive of materials spanning Wang's adult life, with the stated aim of promoting scholarly and public understanding of Wang through his own writings and the accounts of his associates. In 2021, Wenying, Wang's eldest son, donated Wang's personal papers to the Hoover Institution at Stanford University.

== Personal life ==
Wang was married to Chen Bijun. They were betrothed and had an informal wedding shortly before the assassination attempt on Prince Chun and were formally married in 1912. The couple had six children, five of whom survived into adulthood:

- Wang Wenying (汪文嬰; 1913–2011) — Wang's eldest son; studied political economy at the University of Cologne and served in the RNG before immigrating to the United States.
- Wang Wenxing (汪文惺; 1914–2015) — Wang's eldest daughter, born in Toulouse, France; "Xing" in her name is a homage to Zeng Xing (曾醒, 1882–1954), Wang's family friend who helped raise her. Wenxing graduated from a normal school in Jiangsu and taught primary schools in Hong Kong, where she changed her name to Chorfu (汪楚芙). She married Ho Mang Hang (何孟恒 aka 何文傑, 1916–2016) in Hanoi in 1939. She opposed her father's collaborationist government, held no position within it, and was accordingly spared prosecution after the war. Her husband served two years' imprisonment for collaboration and later worked in the Department of Botany at the University of Hong Kong. The couple retired to the United States in 1984 and founded the Wang Jingwei Irrevocable Trust in 2010.
  - He Chongguang aka He Bingbing (何重光 aka 何冰冰, 1943–) — first daughter of Wenxing, born in Nanjing; named by Wang Jingwei, chongguang means "retrocession." She immigrated to the US in 1974 and retired to New Jersey. She is married to Wu An (吳安).
  - Cindy Ho (何重嘉, 1953–) — second daughter of Wenxing, born in Hong Kong and moved to the US in 1970; director of the Wang Jingwei Irrevocable Trust.
- Wang Wenbin (汪文彬; 1920–2015) — Wang's second daughter; worked for the Indonesian government before becoming a nun.
- Wang Wenxun (汪文恂; 1922–2002) — Wang's third daughter, born in Guangzhou; became a professor of education at the University of Hong Kong.
- Wang Wenjing (汪文靖; 1923) — Wang's second son, born in Chicago while Chen Bijun was on a fundraising tour for Guangzhou Zhixin High School. He was placed in a local foundling home, where he died within weeks.
- Wang Wenti (汪文悌; 1928–2024) — Wang's third son; sentenced in 1946 to 18 months' imprisonment for collaboration. After serving his sentence, he settled in Hong Kong and worked as a bridge engineer, participating in several projects on the mainland in the 1980s.

Some sources indicate that Wang had a mistress named Shi Dan (施旦) in his later years in Nanjing. Originally the wife of a military officer under Zeng Zhongming, Shi divorced and became Wang's secretary and housekeeper. After Wang's death, Shi withdrew to a residence in the New Territories of Kowloon, Hong Kong, where she lived as a Buddhist recluse for the rest of her life. In the garden of her home, she erected a memorial tomb containing Wang's clothing.

== Popular culture ==
Wang appears as a character in Chinese-language film and television, typically in minor roles depicting his early years. Notable directors including Edward Yang, Jiang Wen, and Ang Lee have each attempted to develop films featuring Wang, without success, reflecting the highly sensitive and politically contentious legacy of his later years. Wang Shuo has written a film script for the planned project by Jiang Wen, while Sha Yexin had been working until his death on a stage play centred on Wang Jingwei and Chen Bijun, both works remaining unpublished.

The period of Wang's collaborationist government (1940–1945) was a taboo subject on Chinese screen until Ang Lee's 2007 Chinese-American co-production Lust, Caution, the first film the Chinese authorities permitted to be set against this backdrop. The film, in which Wang is not a character, drew controversy for its alleged sympathy for the Wang regime, among others.

=== Film ===
- In the 1983 film He Long (Chinese: 賀龍軍長), Wang is portrayed by Ma Hongying.
- In the 1988 film Assassinating Wang Jingwei (Chinese: 刺殺汪精衛), Wang is portrayed by Sun Yanjun.
- In the 2007 film Axis of War: The First of August (Chinese: 八月一日), Wang is portrayed by Waise Lee.
- In the 2011 film 1911 (Chinese: 辛亥革命), Wang is portrayed by Yu Shaoqun.
- In the 2011 film The First President (Chinese: 第一大總統), Wang is portrayed by Liu Xiaofeng.
- In the 2017 film The Founding of an Army (Chinese: 建軍大業), Wang is portrayed by Yu Shaoqun.

=== Television ===
- In the 1997 television series Pan Hannian (Chinese: 潘漢年), Wang is portrayed by Yuan Chaoqun.
- In the 1997 television series Originally is Thickly Full of Affection (Chinese: 儂本多情), Wang is portrayed by an unidentified actor (the character is named Wang Jianguo, written as an allusion to Wang Jingwei).
- In the 2001 television series Sun Yat-sen (Chinese: 孫文), Wang is portrayed by Chen Xiaofei.
- In the 2003 television series Towards the Republic (Chinese: 走向共和), Wang is portrayed by Jia Zhigang.
- In the 2003 television series Yan'an Song (Chinese: 延安頌), Wang is portrayed by Qu Guoqiang.
- In the 2006 television series Guangzhou Storm (Chinese: 羊城風暴), Wang is portrayed by Meng Jianhua.
- In the 2008 television series Zhou Enlai in Chongqing (Chinese: 周恩來在重慶), Wang is portrayed by Chen Tianlu.
- In the 2009 television series General Ye Ting (Chinese: 葉挺將軍), Wang is portrayed by Liu Xinfen.
- In the 2009 television series Originally is Thickly Full of Affection (Chinese: 儂本多情), Wang is portrayed by Wang Jianguo (the character shares the actor's name in this remake of the 1997 series).
- In the 2010 television series The Incredible Conspiracy (Chinese: 驚天陰謀), Wang is portrayed by Xia Zhiying.
- In the 2010 television series Huang Yanpei (Chinese: 黃炎培), Wang is portrayed by Liu Xiaoxi.
- In the 2010 television series Freedom Fighter, Lee Hoe-young (Korean: 자유인이회영), Wang is portrayed by Jeong Heung-chae.
- In the 2011 television series Revolution of 1911 (Chinese: 辛亥革命), Wang is portrayed by Ma Guangze.
- In the 2011 television series Heaven and Earth (Chinese: 開天辟地), Wang is portrayed by Yu Yi.
- In the 2013 television series Mao Zedong (Chinese: 毛澤東), Wang is portrayed by Liu Yijun.
- In the 2013 television series Bloody Rose: Women's Special Forces (Chinese: 血色玫瑰之女子特遣隊), Wang is portrayed by Wen Zhang.
- In the 2014 television series Battle of Changsha (Chinese: 長沙保衛戰), Wang is portrayed by Guo Hao.
- In the 2015 television series Young Marshal (Chinese: 少帥), Wang is portrayed by Qiao Minglin.
- In the 2016 television series Eastern Battlefield (Chinese: 東方戰場), Wang is portrayed by Gallen Lo.
- In the 2017 television series Passionate Military Flag (Chinese: 熱血軍旗), Wang is portrayed by Zhang Gong.
- In the 2021 television series Glory and Dream (Chinese: 光榮與夢想), Wang is portrayed by Huang Jue.
- In the 2021 television series Swim Against the Current (Chinese: 中流擊水), Wang is portrayed by Shao Feng.
- In the 2021 television series Xiang Jingyu (Chinese: 向警予), Wang is portrayed by Wang Zheng.
- In the 2023 television series The Forerunner (aka Wondering the Vast) (Chinese: 問蒼茫), Wang is portrayed by Zhang Xiaolong.
- In the 2023 television series Stay Young Stay Passion (Chinese: 珠江人家), Wang is portrayed by an unidentified actor.
- In the 2025 television series Glorious Struggle (Chinese: 浴血榮光), Wang is portrayed by Tan Kai.

=== Stage ===
- In the 2026 stage production Jingwei (Chinese: 精衛), Wang is portrayed by Li Jiade.

== See also ==
- Reorganization Group
- Collaboration with the Empire of Japan

Political offices
Preceded by Hu Hanmin (acting generalissimo)	Chairman of the National Government of the ROC (in Guangdong); 1925–1926	Succeeded by Tan Yankai
Preceded by None	Chairman of the Standing Committee of the National Government (rival nationalist government based in Wuhan); 1927	Succeeded by None
Preceded by Sun Fo	Premier of the Republic of China; 1932–1935	Succeeded by Chiang Kai-shek
Preceded by None	President of the Republic of China (Nanjing regime); 1940–1944	Succeeded by Chen Gongbo
