= Zeng Xing =

Chinese politician (born 1882)

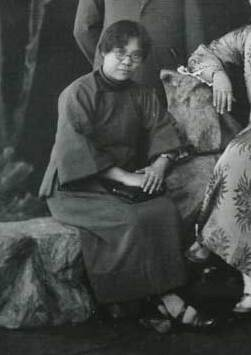
- Born: 1882; Fuzhou, Fujian, Qing dynasty
- Died: 1954 (aged 71–72)
- Political party: Tongmenghui
- Spouse: Fang Shenglian
- Relatives: Zeng Zhongming (brother)

Chinese name
- Chinese: 曾醒
Transcriptions
Standard Mandarin
- Hanyu Pinyin: Zēng Xǐng
- Wade–Giles: Tsêng Hsing

Zeng Xing (Chinese: 曾醒; pinyin: Zēng Xǐng; Wade–Giles: Tsêng Hsing^{3}; 1882–1954) was an early female member of the Tongmenghui and the Head of the Women's Department of the Organizational Development Committee during the 1st National Congress of the Kuomintang. She was a member of the Control Yuan of the Wang Jingwei regime during the Second Sino-Japanese War.

== Life ==
Born in Fuzhou, Zeng Xing studied in Japan in her early years. When her husband died, she accompanied her in-laws such as Fang Shengdong, Fang Shengtao, Fang Junying, who studied in Japan to join the Tongmenghui. After the 1911 Revolution, she was appointed as the Head of the Women's Department during the 1st National Congress of the Kuomintang. She previously served as the supervisor of Fujian Shifan Girls School and the principal of Guangzhou Zhixin High School. In 1912, she studied in France. She participated in several women's movements. During the 1924 International Women's Day, she made a speech with He Xiangning on protecting women's rights.

In September 1939, Zeng Xing joined the 6th National Congress of the Kuomintang led by the Wang Jingwei regime, and served as a member of the Control Yuan.
