= National Government Committee (Wang Jingwei regime) =

Organ in charge of political affairs of Wang Jingwei National Government

- 國民政府委員會

Agency overview
- Formed: March 30, 1940
- Preceding agency: Central Political Committee of the Kuomintang
- Dissolved: August 16, 1945
- Jurisdiction: Wang Jingwei's Nationalist Government
- Headquarters: Nanjing
- Parent department: Central Political Committee

The National Government Committee was the organ in charge of political affairs of Wang Jingwei National Government. According to its Organic Law of the National Government of the Republic of China, the National Government Committee was composed of the Chairman of the National Government and members of the National Government, and the candidates were decided by the Central Political Committee.

== President ==
On March 30, 1940, the Wang Jingwei regime was established in Nanjing, with Wang Jingwei serving as the acting chairman (at that time, Lin Sen, who was still in Chongqing, was the chairman of the National Government). On November 28 of the same year, the Central Political Committee held a meeting to revise the Organic Law of the National Government of the Republic of China, deleting the clauses that "the chairman shall not bear actual political responsibility" and "the chairman shall not hold other official positions," and elected Wang Jingwei as the chairman of the National Government.

In 1944, Wang Jingwei went to Japan for treatment due to the worsening of his condition. On March 22 of the same year, the Central Political Committee held an emergency meeting. Based on Wang Jingwei's proposal before his departure, the meeting decided that Chen Gongbo, the president of the Legislative Yuan, would serve as acting chairman of the National Government. After Wang Jingwei's death, Chen Gongbo held an inauguration ceremony on November 20 as acting chairman of the National Government. Although Wang Jingwei was dead, Chen Gongbo still insisted on using the title "acting chairman".

Name	Assumed office	Left office	Note
Lin Sen			On March 30, 1940, Lin Sen, Chairman of the National Government, issued a statement strongly condemning the puppet organization of Wang Jingwei.
Wang Zhaoming	March 30, 1940	November 28, 1940	Acting
Wang Zhaoming	November 28, 1940	November 10, 1944	Died on November 10, 1944.
Chen Gongbo	March 22, 1944	August 16, 1945	The Nationalist government was dissolved on August 16, 1945.

== Committee ==
The committee members included:

Name	Inauguration date
Wang Kemin	1940
Zhang Yongfu	1940
Pu Dong	1940
Zhang Yinghua	1940
Dong Kang	1940
Chu Minyi	December 12, 1940
Chen Zhongfu	May 1, 1941
Zhao Zhengping	August 16, 1941
Yang Shoumei	August 16, 1941
Zhang Guoyuan	September 11, 1941
Ni Daolang	1942
Liao Entao	1942
Enkebatu	1943
Wang Yitang	1943
Chen Jicheng	1943
Cen Deguang	1943
Zhou Zuoren	1943
Xu Liang	1943
Chen Qun	June 17, 1943
Zhao Yusong	August 26, 1943
Lee Tae-fen	February 3, 1944
Wang Daoyuan	1944
Jiang Kanghu	November 2, 1944
Luo Junqiang	December 27, 1944
Yu Xijie	January 18, 1945
Chen Jizu	January 18, 1945
Kexing'e	February 1, 1945
Gao Guanwu	March 3, 1945
Chen Chunpu	May 3, 1945
Xiang Zhizhuang	May 3, 1945
Cai Pei	May 3, 1945
