= Chen Bijun =

Chinese politician

- 陳璧君
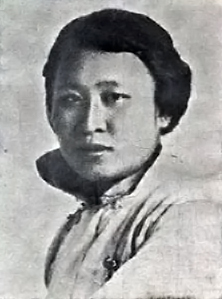
- Chen Bijun in her years of Chinese drama
- Born: 5 November 1891; George Town, Penang, Straits Settlements (now Malaysia)
- Died: 17 June 1959 (aged 67); Shanghai, China
- Occupation: Politician
- Spouse: Wang Jingwei
- Children: 6

Chen Bijun
- Traditional Chinese: 陳璧君
- Simplified Chinese: 陈璧君
Transcriptions
Standard Mandarin
- Hanyu Pinyin: Chén Bìjūn

Chen Bijun (Chinese: 陳璧君, 5 November 1891 – 17 June 1959) was a Chinese revolutionary and politician. Born into a prominent merchant family in British Malaya, she followed Wang Jingwei to join the revolution against the Qing dynasty. After marrying Wang, she wielded considerable influence over his political career from his leadership of the Nationalist government to his collaborationist regime during the Second Sino-Japanese War. She was tried for treason after the war and remained imprisoned until her death.

== Life ==
Daughter of the Chinese Malaysian millionaire Chen Gengji and his second wife Wei Yuelang, Chen Bijun was raised in Penang, British Malaya. Like her many siblings, she received home schooling in traditional Chinese learning before attending Catholic boarding schools for an English-style education.

She was introduced to Wang Jingwei through a local Tongmenghui leader. Chen broke off her engagement to a cousin and went with Wang to Singapore to meet Sun Yat-sen. In 1909, she moved to Japan on the pretext of furthering her studies and formally became a member of the revolutionary Tongmenghui. Her father was a royalist and unaware of her political activities; Chen Bijun's mother funded her activism. They become betrothed and held an informal wedding days before the failed assassination plot by Wang and other Tongmenghui members against Prince Chun. Wang's arrest followed two weeks after the failed attempt. He was released from prison in 1911 as part of the amnesty for political prisoners following the Wuchang Uprising.

Chen and Wang formally married in 1912. They ultimately had six children together.

In 1924, she was one of only three women delegates of the KMT national congress along with He Xiangning and Tang Yungong, and elected a member of the KMT Central Supervisory Committee. During the 1936 kidnapping of Chiang Kai-shek, the Xi'an Incident, she unsuccessfully attempted to have her spouse depose Chiang in a coup.

=== Wartime activities ===
After the outbreak of the Second Sino-Japanese War, Chen and Wang fled to Hanoi, Tonkin in December 1938, where they called for a negotiated peace with Japan. In August 1939, Wang convened the Sixth National Congress of the Chinese Nationalist Party in occupied Shanghai, where Chen was elected a standing member of the Central Control Commission of the collaborationist Kuomintang. The Reorganized National Government of the Republic of China (RNG) was formally established in March 1940.

Within the RNG, Chen and her allies formed the so-called "household clique" (公館派), dominating the political apparatus through Chu Minyi, husband of Chen's adopted sister, as a counterweight to Chen Gongbo. In November 1944, she oversaw the repatriation of Wang's remains from Nagoya, Japan, to Nanjing. By this time, with Japanese forces in retreat and the Allied counteroffensive underway, the Wang government's governor of Guangdong, Chen Chunpu, abandoned his post. Chen Bijun returned to Guangdong to take charge.

=== Post war ===
After the surrender of the Japanese in August 1945, she was offered but rejected an evacuation by the Japanese. She was arrested by the order of Chiang Kai-shek on 25 August and charged with treason. She refused to admit guilt and didn't appeal when she was sentenced for life imprisonment because it was meaningless. She was imprisoned in Suzhou.

In 1949, upon the Communist takeover, she was transferred to a Shanghai prison. A widely circulated but unverified account holds that on the request of He Xiangning and Soong Ching-ling, Mao Zedong and Zhou Enlai offered Chen a pardon if she would write a statement of repentance to denounce Wang Jingwei, but she refused. She remained in prison until her death.

== In popular culture ==
The 2007 Chinese historical film Road to Dawn features the character "Xu Danrong" based on Chen played by Malaysian-born actress Angelica Lee.
