= 6th National Congress of the Kuomintang (Wang Jingwei) =

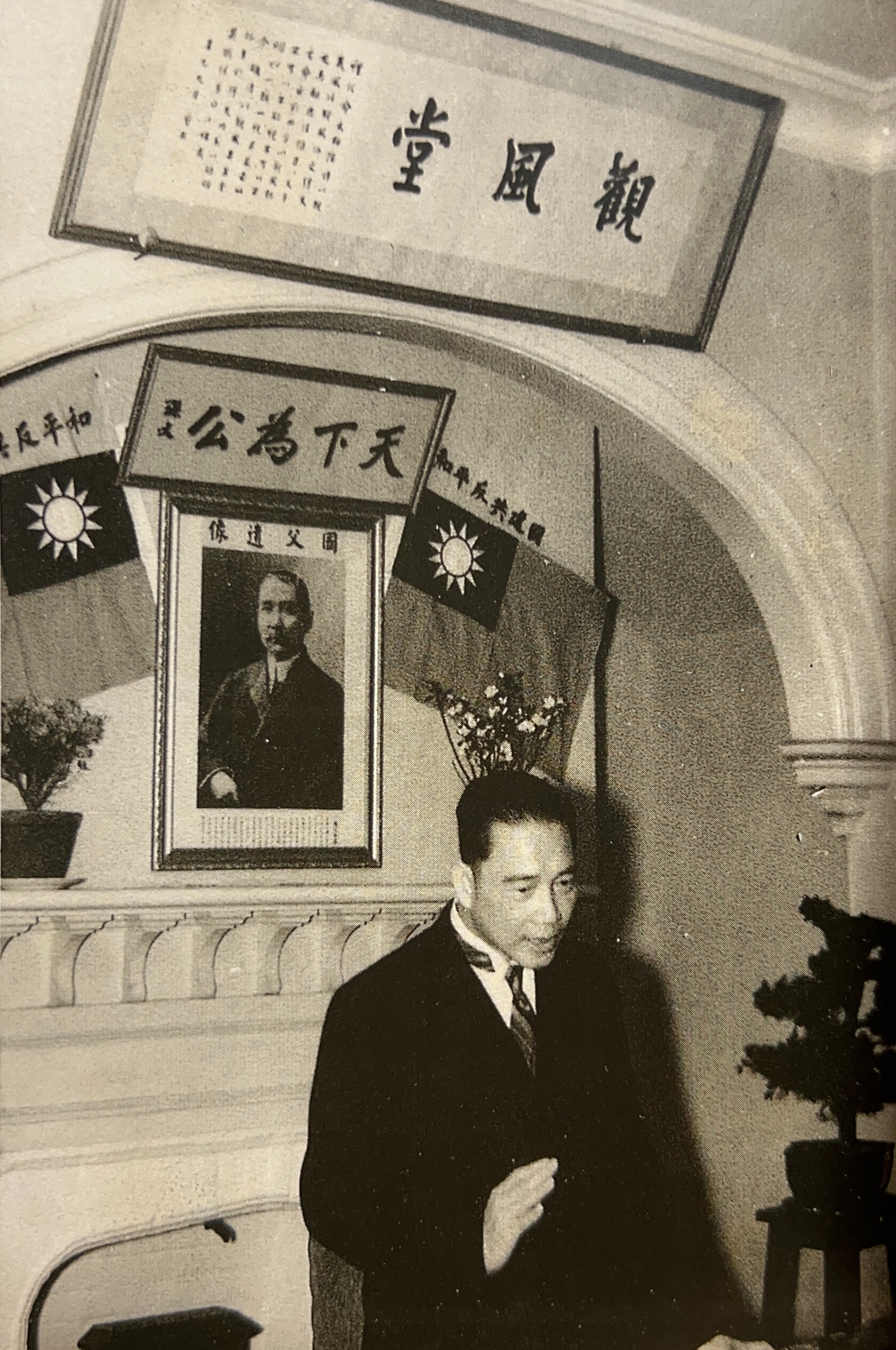
Wang Jingwei at Chinese Embassy in Manchukuo.

The 6th National Congress of the Kuomintang (Chinese: 中國國民黨第六次全國代表大会) was held by Wang Jingwei and his followers from the Kuomintang in exile after he defected from Chiang Kai-shek to Japan, in Japanese-occupied Shanghai, on 28 August 1939. As he was a collaborator, this congress was not considered legitimate after the war. A "central political conference" was held in Nanjing later on 20 March 1940, establishing his new regime. The Congress eventually led to the formation of the Reorganized National Government of the Republic of China, a puppet state of Japan under Wang's leadership.

== Literature ==
- Cai Jin and Xiao Bian (1982). The Chronicle of Wang Jingwei's Former Government (汪精衛偽国民政府紀事). China Social Sciences Press (中国社会科学出版社), Beijing.
