= Kuomintang (Wang Jingwei) =

Axis collaborationist party (1939–1945)

Kuomintang 中國國民黨 Zhōngguó Guómíndǎng Chungkuo Kuomintang Chūgoku Kokumintō
- Abbreviation: KMT
- Premier: Sun Yat-sen (eternal)
- Chairman: Wang Jingwei (1939–1944); Chen Gongbo (1944–1945)
- Founded: 28 November 1939
- Dissolved: 16 August 1945
- Split from: Kuomintang
- Headquarters: Nanjing, Republic of China
- Armed wing: Collaborationist Chinese Army
- Ideology: Three Principles of the People; Pan-Asianism; Anti-communism; Collaborationism
- International affiliation: Greater East Asia Co-Prosperity Sphere
- Colours: Blue
- Anthem: "Three Principles of the People"

Party flag
- Politics of the Republic of China; Political parties; Elections; a: Claimed to be the legitimate Kuomintang in contrast to the Chiang Kai-shek-led government in Chongqing

During the Second Sino-Japanese War, Wang Jingwei, former Premier of the Republic of China and Vice Director-General of the Kuomintang (Chinese Nationalist Party), split from the party in 1939 and established a new Kuomintang in Nanjing. Wang, who collaborated with the Japanese, intended to distance the new party from the Kuomintang led by Chiang Kai-shek in Chongqing. It was the sole ruling party of the Wang Jingwei regime, a puppet government of the Empire of Japan and rival government of the nationalists.

Officially still the "Kuomintang" (traditional Chinese: 中國國民黨; simplified Chinese: 中国国民党; pinyin: Zhōngguó Guómíndǎng), it was also referred to as "Wang's Pseudo-Kuomintang" or "Wang's Puppet Kuomintang" (traditional Chinese: 汪偽國民黨; simplified Chinese: 汪伪国民党; pinyin: Wāng wěi guómíndǎng).

== Establishment ==
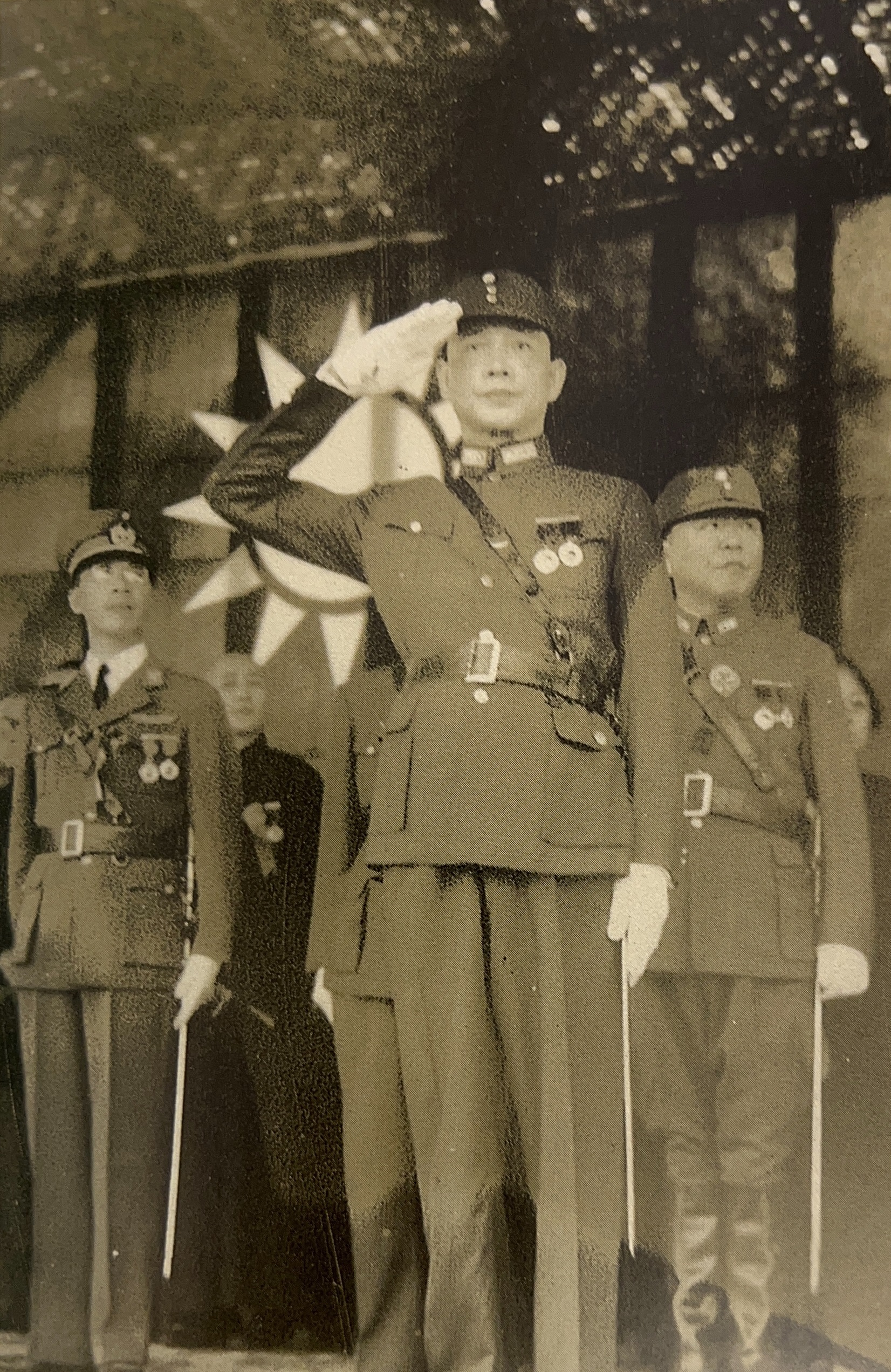
Wang Jingwei in his military uniform; the Kuomintang flag can be seen on the background

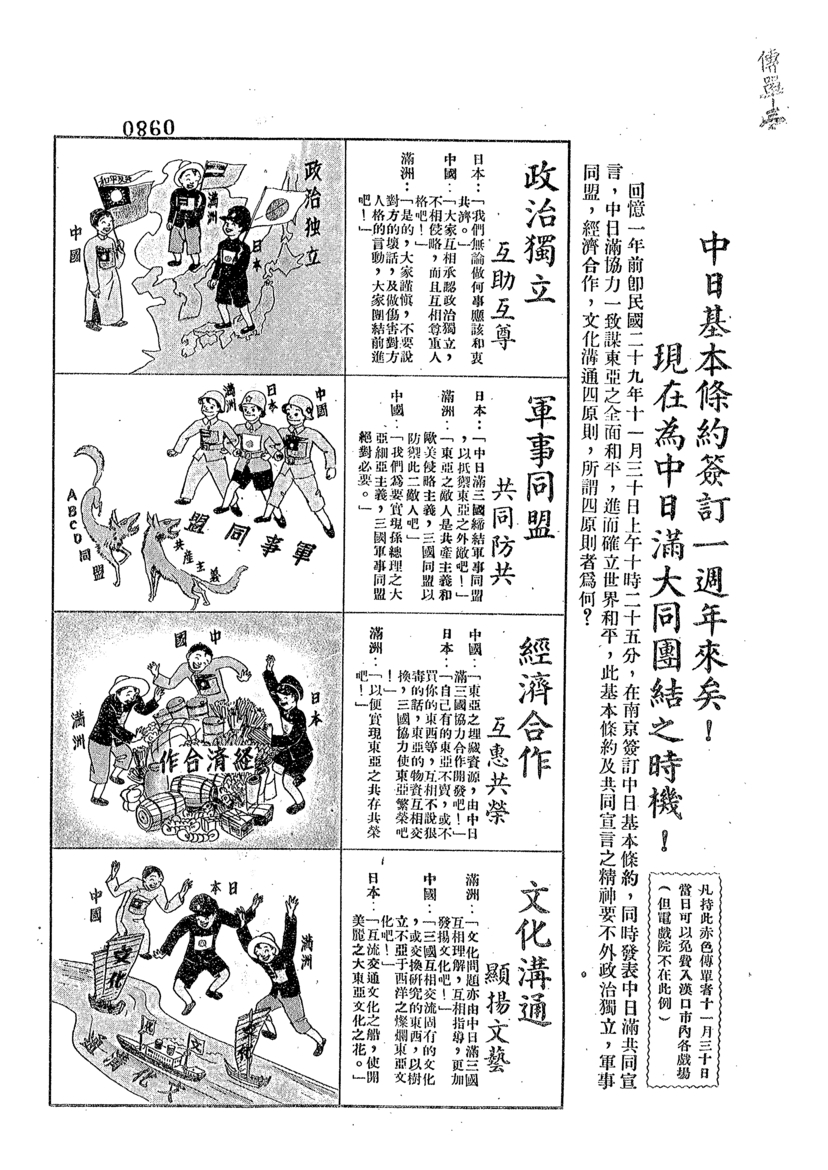
A propaganda leaflet to promote the unequal treaty of "China-Japan Basic Treaty"

From 28 to 30 August 1939, Wang Jingwei secretly convened the 6th National Congress of the KMT in the city of Shanghai. Wang appointed himself and served as the temporary chairman of the conference and gave a political report on the situation of the country regarding the Second Sino-Japanese War. The General Assembly then passed the "Resolution on Reorganizing Party Affairs" and two temporary motions, determined that all resolutions and orders of the Kuomintang under Chiang in Chongqing were completely invalid, and soon elected Wang Jingwei as the chairman of the Central Executive Committee. In accordance with the purpose of "Peaceful Anti-communist Nation Building," the congress then passed the "Revision of the Chinese Kuomintang Political Platform", declared a "Decision to Anti-Communist Basic National Policy", and issued fundamental adjustments to resume Sino-Japanese diplomatic relations.

On 30 March 1940, Wang Jingwei attended the "National Government Capital Returning Ceremony" and established a puppet government in Nanjing. The state was named, "the Reorganized National Government of the Republic of China". Wang served as the President of the Executive Yuan and Chairman of the National Government (Chinese: 行政院長兼國民政府主席). He issued the "Ten Political Platforms for Peaceful Nation Building" which, by this time, the Kuomintang was the only legal sole-ruling party in the regime. it ruled the country directly under Wang Jingwei, essentially a one-party dictatorship. and nominally participated in the management of the North China Political Affairs Committee and the Mengjiang United Autonomous Government.

=== Leadership ===
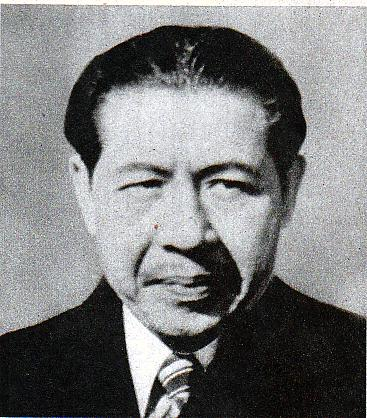
Chen Gongbo, second President of the Wang Jingwei regime. He took the leadership of Wang's KMT after his death in 1944.

At the beginning of its establishment, Wang's Kuomintang still recognized Lin Sen, who was appointed by Chiang Kai-shek in Chongqing as the chairman of the National Government. However, Wang Jingwei appointed himself as the "acting chairman", concurrently serving as the chief executive and chairman of the Standing Committee of the Central Executive Committee.

On 10 November 1944, Wang Jingwei died in Nagoya. On 12 November, the Nanjing "Central Political Committee" held an emergency meeting and decided that Chen Gongbo would be the president of the executive committee, acting chairman of the National Government, and chairman of the military committee. Chen officially took office on 20 November. When he took office, Chen Gongbo stated that he would adhere to the policy set by Wang Jingwei and would not waver no matter how the war progresses or how urgent the current situation is. Following Chen Gongbo, Zhou Fohai became the mayor of Shanghai in January 1945.

== Dissolution ==
After Japan surrendered on 15 August 1945, Chen Gongbo and Zhou Fohai convened an interim meeting of the Central Political Committee in Nanjing at 4 p.m. on 16 August, announcing the abolition of the Reorganized National Government and all of its institutions, including the party.
