= 6th National Congress of the Kuomintang =

The 6th National Congress of the Kuomintang (Chinese: 中國國民黨第六次全國代表大会) was the sixth national congress of the Kuomintang, held on 5 May 1945 at Chungking, Republic of China. This congress saw the first participation of Taiwan Province in the congress, represented by Hsieh Tung-min, despite Taiwan being under Japanese rule.

== Results ==
The congress outlined keynotes for national reconstruction and constitutional matters after the Pacific War. It also established the framework for a democratic government.

== See also ==
- Kuomintang
