= Chen Gongbo =

Chinese politician (1892–1946)

- 陳公博
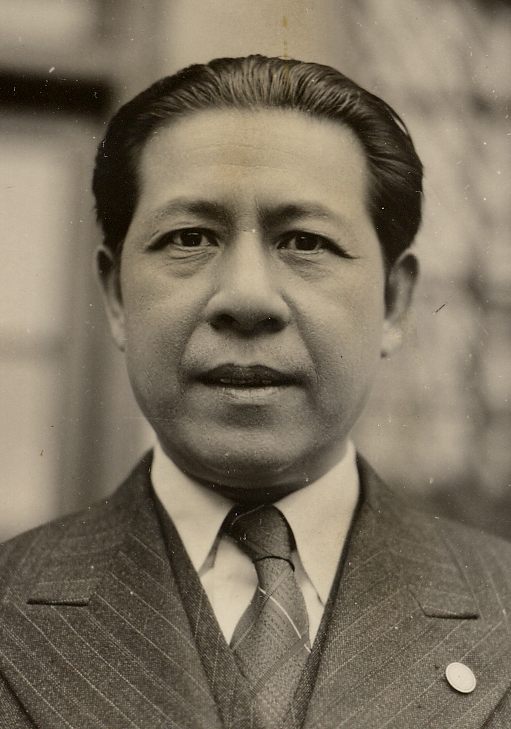
- Chen in 1940

Chairman of the National Government Committee of China (Wang Jingwei regime)
- In office November 1944 – August 1945
- Preceded by: Wang Jingwei
- Succeeded by: Office abolished

Premier of China (Wang Jingwei regime)
- In office November 1944 – August 1945
- Preceded by: Wang Jingwei
- Succeeded by: Office abolished

Chairman of the Central Political Committee (Wang Jingwei regime)
- In office November 1944 – August 1945
- Preceded by: Wang Jingwei
- Succeeded by: Office abolished

Chairman of Kuomintang (Wang Jingwei regime)
- In office November 1944 – August 1945
- Preceded by: Wang Jingwei
- Succeeded by: Office abolished

President of the Legislative Yuan (Wang Jingwei regime)
- In office March 1940 – November 1944
- Preceded by: Office established
- Succeeded by: Liang Hongzhi

Mayor of Shanghai (Wang Jingwei regime)
- In office 20 November 1940 – 11 November 1944
- Succeeded by: Zhou Fohai

Minister of Industry
- In office 28 December 1931 – 1 December 1935
- Preceded by: H. H. Kung
- Succeeded by: Wu Dingchang

Personal details
- Born: 19 October 1892 Nanhai, Foshan, Guangdong, Qing Empire
- Died: 3 June 1946 (aged 54) Suzhou, Jiangsu, Republic of China
- Party: CCP (1921–1922); Independent (1922–1925); KMT (1925–1937); KMT-Nanjing (1937–1945)
- Other political affiliations: Reorganization Group
- Education: Peking University (BS); Columbia University (MA)

Chen Gongbo
- Traditional Chinese: 陳公博
- Simplified Chinese: 陈公博
Transcriptions
Standard Mandarin
- Hanyu Pinyin: Chén Gōngbó
- Wade–Giles: Ch'en2 Kung1-po2
Hakka
- Pha̍k-fa-sṳ: Chhṳ̀n Kûng-pok
Yue: Cantonese
- Jyutping: Can^{4} Gung^{1}-bok^{3}

Chen Gongbo (Chinese: 陳公博; Wade–Giles: Ch'en Kung-po; Japanese: Chin Kōhaku; October 19, 1892 – June 3, 1946) was a Chinese left-wing politician. Due to his role as the second and final president of the Reorganized National Government of the Republic of China, a puppet government of Japan, he was convicted of treason against the Republic of China and executed.

== Biography ==
Chen Gongbo was born in Nanhai, Foshan, Guangdong, Qing Empire in 1892 to a Hakka peasant family which had migrated from Shanghang, Fujian to Ruyuan Yao Autonomous County, Guangdong, with his grandfather eventually settling in Nanhai, Foshan. His father was an official in the Qing administration. As a student at Peking University, he participated in the May Fourth Movement and studied Marxism under Chen Duxiu. Chen Gongbo was one of the founders of the Chinese Communist Party and a member of its First Congress in Shanghai in July 1921, but was expelled from the CCP becaused he supported Chen Jiongming during the June 16 Incident in 1922. When he was in the CCP, He was influenced by social democracy in Germany. He then moved to the United States, where he obtained a master's degree in Economics at Columbia University in 1925.

On his return to China he joined the Kuomintang (KMT) and was named head of the Department of Peasants and Workers under Liao Zhongkai, and was considered a member of the KMT leftist clique together with Wang Jingwei, with whom he developed a close political and personal relationship. Although he played a significant role in Chiang Kai-shek's Northern Expedition, he—along with Wang Jingwei—strongly opposed Chiang as Chiang began to exercise dictatorial power. He felt it particularly unfair for Chiang to have replaced Wang in KMT leadership through a military coup in 1926. However, during a period of Chiang-Wang cooperation, he was named Minister of Industry by the Kuomintang government from 1932 to 1936. Some of the fundamental national economic policies he helped set in this period remained in practice under various Chinese political regimes until the 1970s. As director of the Kuomintang Sichuan branch, he helped organize the evacuation of the Kuomintang government to Chongqing after the start of the Second Sino-Japanese War.

However, he remained politically aloof to Chiang Kai-shek and, after Wang Jingwei broke ranks with the Kuomintang and established the collaborationist Wang Jingwei Government, Chen soon followed despite his initial opposition. Within the new government Chen became the speaker of the Legislative Yuan. After nominal rule over Shanghai was turned over to the Nanjing Nationalist Government by Japan in November 1940, Chen was appointed mayor. In mid-1944, when Wang traveled to Japan for medical treatment, Chen was left in charge as acting president of the Executive Yuan, becoming president of the government upon Wang's death in November 1944.

At the end of World War II, Chen fled to Japan and, immediately following Japan's formal surrender, on September 9, 1945, China's representative Gen. He Yingqin asked Japan's representative Gen. Yasuji Okamura to extradite him to China to stand trial for treason. The request was granted by the American occupation forces, and Chen was escorted back to China on October 3. At his trial he defended himself vigorously, insisting that as president he had refused to cooperate with the Japanese in several significant matters and had acted only because of his loyalty to his friend, Wang Jingwei. Nevertheless, he was convicted of treason and sentenced to death. He took his fate calmly, saying that "soon I will be reunited with Wang Jingwei in the next world". Chen was executed by firing squad at Suzhou, Jiangsu, on June 3, 1946.

== Sources ==
- David P. Barrett and Larry N. Shyu, eds.; Chinese Collaboration with Japan, 1932–1945: The Limits of Accommodation Stanford University Press 2001.
- John H. Boyle, China and Japan at War, 1937–1945: The Politics of Collaboration (Harvard University Press, 1972).
- James C. Hsiung and Steven I. Levine, eds., China's Bitter Victory: The War with Japan, 1937–1945 (Armonk, N.Y.: M. E. Sharpe, 1992).
- Ch'i Hsi-sheng, Nationalist China at War: Military Defeats and Political Collapse, 1937–1945 (Ann Arbor: University of Michigan Press, 1982).
- Frederick W. Mote, Japanese-Sponsored Governments in China, 1937–1945 (Stanford University Press, 1954).
- David Serfass, Biographical Dictionary of Occupied China (ENP-China, 2023).
- Margherita Zanasi, "Chen Gongbo and the Construction of a Modern Nation in 1930s China," in Timothy Brook and Andre Schmid, eds.; Nation Work: Asian Elites and National Identities (University of Michigan Press, 2000).
