= Fang Junying =

Chinese revolutionary (1884–1923)

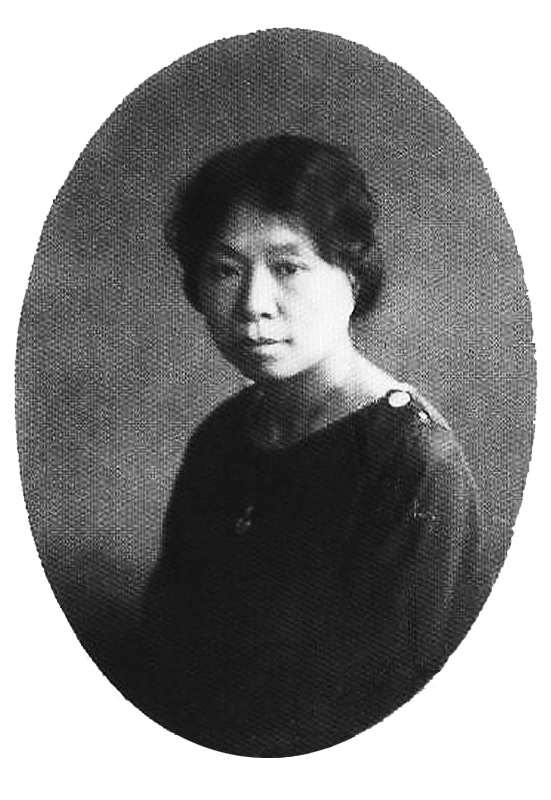
Fang Junying

Fang Junying (1884–1923) was a Chinese revolutionary.

She was the niece of the progressive reformer Fang Jiashi, a follower of Weng Tonghe, and sister of the revolutionaries Fang Shengdong and Fang Shengtao. From 1901 to 1911, she studied in Japan, and became involved with the revolutionary republican movements among the Chinese students there. She became a member of the Tonghmenghui in 1905, and head of its assassination section in 1907. In 1908, she participated in a planned assassination of Prince regent Zaifeng. She was one of the ideologists who planned the Guangzhou Uprising on 27 April 1911.

From 1912 to 1922, she studied in France. Upon her return to China, she committed suicide through an overdose of morphine. She stated her reason as her sorrow over the rampant corruption in China.
