= Zhu Peide =

Chinese General

- 朱培德
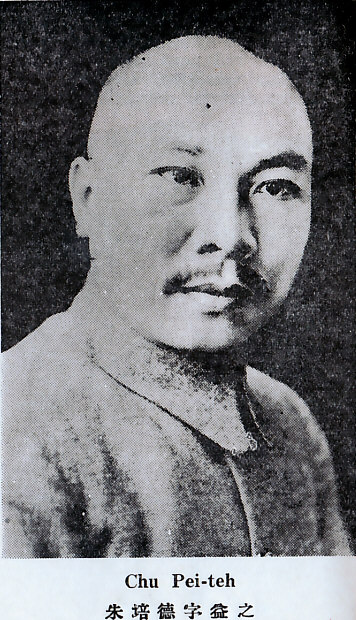

Chief of the General Staff
- In office 11 September 1929 – 16 March 1932
- Preceded by: He Yingqin
- Succeeded by: Chiang Kai-Shek

Governor of Jiangxi
- In office 7 November 1927 – 10 September 1929
- Preceded by: Li Liejun
- Succeeded by: Lu Diping

Personal details
- Born: 6 October 1889 Lufeng, Yunnan, Qing China
- Died: 17 February 1937 (aged 47) Nanjing, Republic of China
- Party: Kuomintang

Zhu Peide, also Chu Pei-teh (Chinese: 朱培德; pinyin: Zhū Péidé; 6 October 1889 – 17 February 1937) was a Chinese General. Born in Lufeng, Yunnan. He held positions such as colonel general of the National Revolutionary Army in China, Commander of the Third Army, and Governor of Jiangxi Province. He died due to medical malpractice in 1937.

== Biography ==
=== Early years ===
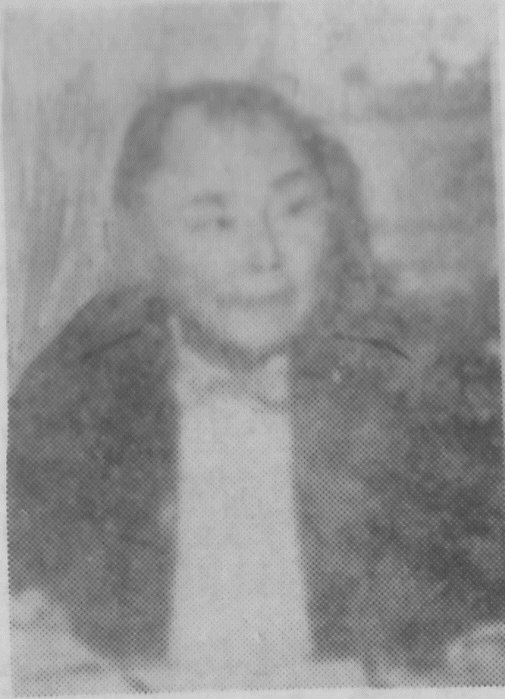
Zhu Peide

Zhu Peide was schoolmates with famous communist General Zhu De, and because of their exceptional grades, they were known as "The Two Exceptional Zhu's" and participated in the Xinhai Revolution in 1911. In 1917, he joined Sun Yat-Sen's Constitutional Protection Movement.

=== Career ===
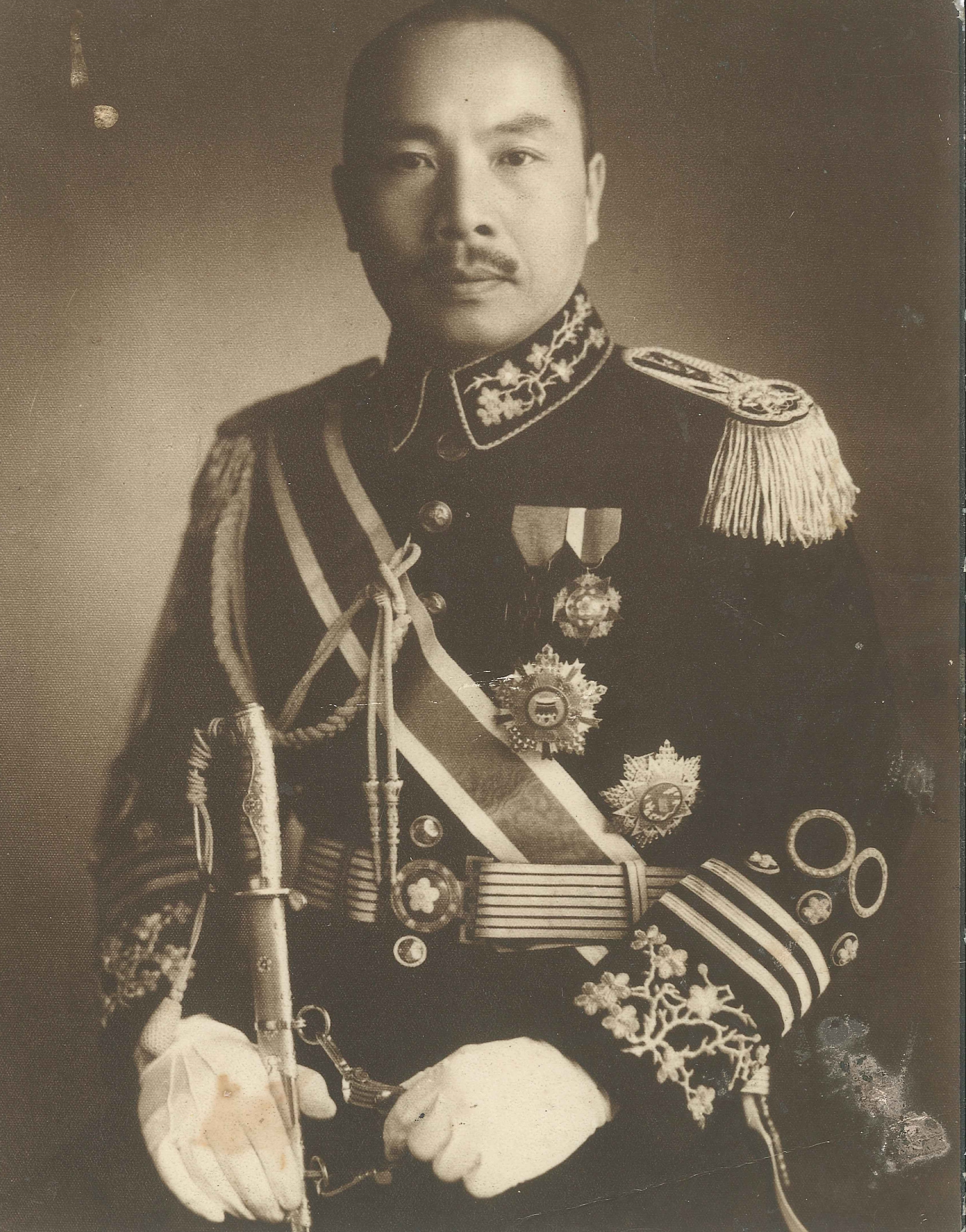
Zhu wearing his military uniform

After the formation of the Nationalist Government in July 1925, his troops were reorganized as the Third Army under the Kuomintang. On October 1, Chen Jiongming tried to convince Zhu to join his forces, considering he already had a deal with Xiong Kewu, however, Zhu was angered to hear the news and ordered them to be arrested while reporting the incident to the Nationalist Government. The government realized the danger of the situation, and promptly arrested Xiong on October 3.

During the Northern Expedition, he served as Governor of Jiangxi Province and appointed Zhu De to be the Nanchang City Public Security Bureau Chief in April 1927. This allowed the Nanchang Uprising to happen.

After the success of the Northern Expedition, he served in a variety of governmental and military roles. and was well trusted by Chiang Kai-Shek. Zhu was invited to be the Director of the General Office of the Military Commission and to participate in the preparations for the Second Sino-Japanese War. While he was anti-communist, he didn't use too much violence against them. In April 1935, he was awarded the position of Army General by the Nationalist Government.

== Death ==
Zhu was hospitalized in the Nanjing Drum Tower Hospital on February 7, 1937 after participating in The Third Plenary Session of the Fifth Central Committee while suffering with his disease. He was treating it with imported anti-anemia drugs, which also caused sepsis. At 11:20 that night, he died.

He was given a state funeral on March 3 of the same year.
