= Central Political Committee (Wang Jingwei regime) =

Highest guiding body of Wang Jingwei's Nationalist government

- 中央政治委員會

Agency overview
- Formed: March 30, 1940
- Preceding agency: Central Political Committee of the Kuomintang
- Dissolved: August 16, 1945
- Superseding agency: Central Political Committee of the Kuomintang
- Jurisdiction: Wang Jingwei's Nationalist Government
- Headquarters: Nanjing

The Central Political Committee was the highest guiding body of Wang Jingwei's Nationalist government, established between March 1940 and 1945.

== History ==
According to the "Organizational Regulations of the Central Political Committee", "the Central Political Committee is the highest guiding body for national politics". Compared with the original Central Political Committee of the Kuomintang, the Central Political Committee of the Wang Jingwei National Government was not an internal party organization. Its members were appointed by the chairman of the Central Political Committee from among the Kuomintang Central Executive Committee members, Central Supervisory Committee members, cadres of other legitimate political parties, and people with prestige in society. However, it still maintained a close relationship with the Kuomintang Central Committee. For example, the organizational regulations stipulated that the chairman of the Central Political Committee was concurrently the chairman of the Kuomintang Central Executive Committee.

In January 1943, the Central Political Council resolved to establish the Supreme National Defense Council, whose powers during its recess were exercised by the Supreme National Defense Council.

== Composition ==
=== The First session (March 24, 1940) ===
- Chairman: Wang Jingwei
- Committee members: Wang Jingwei, Chen Gongbo, Wen Zongyao, Liang Hongzhi, Wang Yitang, and Wang Kemin.
- Attending committee members: Chu Minyi, Zhu Luhe, Jiang Kanghu, Gu Zhongchen
- Designated Committee Members: Zhou Fohai, Chu Minyi, Chen Bijun, Mei Siping, Chen Qun, Lin Bosheng, Liu Yufen, Ren Yuandao, Jiao Ying, Chen Junhui, Chen Yaozu, Ye Peng, Li Shengwu, Ding Mocun, Fu Shishuo, Yang Kuiyi, Bao Wenyue, Xiao Shuxuan, Li Shiqun
- Appointed Committee Members: Qi Xieyuan, Zhu Shen, Yin Tong, Zhuo Tebazhabu, Gao Guanwu, Zhao Zhengping, Miao Bin, Zhao Yusong, Zhu Qinglai, Zhao Shuyong, Cen Deguang
- Secretary-General: Zhou Fohai
- Deputy Secretaries-General: Chen Chunpu, Luo Junqiang

=== The Second session (April 5, 1941) ===
- Committee members: Wang Jingwei, Chen Gongbo, Wen Zongyao, Liang Hongzhi, and Wang Yitang.
- Appointed Committee Members: Wang Kemin, Qi Xieyuan, Zhu Shen, Yin Tong, Gao Guanwu, Zhao Zhengping, Miao Bin, Zhu Qinglai, Zhao Yusong, Zhao Zunyue, Cen Deguang
- Designated Committee Members: Zhou Fohai, Chu Minyi, Chen Bijun, Mei Siping, Chen Qun, Lin Bosheng, Liu Yufen, Ren Yuandao, Jiao Ying, Chen Junhui, Chen Yaozu, Li Shengwu, Ye Peng, Ding Mocun, Fu Shishuo, Yang Kuiyi, Bao Wenyue, Xiao Shuxuan, Li Shiqun
- Attending committee members: Zhu Lihe, Gu Zhongchen, Jiang Kanghu, Xu Liang
- Secretary-General: Zhou Fohai
- Deputy Secretaries-General: Chen Chunpu, Luo Junqiang

=== The Third Session (March 26, 1942) ===
- Committee members: Wang Jingwei, Chen Gongbo, Wen Zongyao, Liang Hongzhi, and Jiang Kanghu.
- Appointed committee Members: Wang Yitang, Wang Kemin, Qi Xieyuan, Zhu Shen, Yin Tong, Gao Guanwu, Zhao Zhengping, Miao Bin, Zhu Qinglai, Zhao Yusong, Zhao Zunyue, Cen Deguang
- Designated committee members: Zhou Fohai, Chu Minyi, Chen Bijun, Mei Siping, Chen Qun, Lin Bosheng, Liu Yufen, Ren Yuandao, Jiao Ying, Chen Junhui, Chen Yaozu, Li Shengwu, Ye Peng, Ding Mocun, Fu Shishuo, Yang Kuiyi, Bao Wenyue, Xiao Shuxuan, Li Shiqun
- Attending committee members: Zhu Lihe, Gu Zhongchen, Xu Liang
- Secretary-General: Zhou Fohai
- Deputy Secretaries-General: Chen Chunpu, Luo Junqiang

=== The Fourth Session (April 1, 1943) ===
- Committee members: Wang Jingwei, Chen Gongbo, Wen Zongyao, Liang Hongzhi, and Jiang Kanghu.
- Appointed Committee members: Wang Yitang, Wang Kemin, Zhu Shen, Wang Shijing, Zhao Zhengping, Zhu Qinglai, Zhao Yusong, Cen Deguang, Wang Yintai, Qi Xieyuan
- Designated Committee members: Zhou Fohai, Chu Minyi, Chen Bijun, Mei Siping, Chen Qun, Lin Bosheng, Liu Yufen, Ren Yuandao, Jiao Ying, Chen Junhui, Chen Yaozu, Li Shengwu, Ye Peng, Ding Mocun, Fu Shishuo, Yang Kuiyi, Bao Wenyue, Xiao Shuxuan, Li Shiqun, Gao Guanwu, Miao Bin, Chen Chunpu, Luo Junqiang
- Secretary-General: Zhou Fohai
- Deputy Secretaries-General: Chen Chunpu, Luo Junqiang

=== The Fifth (March 29, 1944) ===
- Committee members: Same as the fourth session
- Attending committee members: Zhou Fohai, Zhu Qinglai, Zhu Lihe, Gu Zhongchen, Miao Bin
- Secretaries-General: Zhou Fohai, Zhao Zunyue (appointed December 23, 1944), Ding Mocun (appointed January 11, 1945)
- Deputy Secretary-General: Guo Xiufeng (appointed on January 11, 1945)

=== The Sixth (April 5, 1945) ===
- Committee members: Same as the fifth session
- Secretary-General: Ding Mocun, Cen Deguang (appointed June 7, 1945)
- Deputy Secretaries-General: Guo Xiufeng and Peng Ximing (appointed on June 7, 1945)
