= Fang Shengdong =

Chinese politician

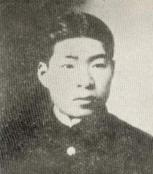
Huong Sing-dong

Fang Shengdong (traditional Chinese: 方聲洞; simplified Chinese: 方声洞; pinyin: Fāng Shēngdòng; Wade–Giles: Fang Sheng-tung; 1886–1911) was a late Qing dynasty revolutionary, He was killed during the Second Guangzhou Uprising.
