= List of shipwrecks in 1965 =

The list of shipwrecks in 1965 includes ships sunk, foundered, grounded, or otherwise lost during 1965.

table of contents
1965
Jan	Feb	Mar	Apr
May	Jun	Jul	Aug
Sep	Oct	Nov	Dec
Unknown date

== January ==
=== 1 January ===
List of shipwrecks: 1 January 1965
Ship	State	Description
Catala	Canada	Catala, 1976 The passenger ship was wrecked in a storm at Ocean Shores, Washington, United States.

=== 3 January ===
List of shipwrecks: 3 January 1965
Ship	State	Description
Lady Ann	United States	The 13-gross register ton, 39.6-foot (12.1 m) fishing vessel was crushed by ice and sank near Ketchikan, Alaska.

=== 6 January ===
List of shipwrecks: 6 January 1965
Ship	State	Description
Diana	United States	The 8-gross register ton, 28.3-foot (8.6 m) motor cargo vessel sank in the small boat harbor at Juneau, Alaska.

=== 7 January ===
List of shipwrecks: 7 January 1965
Ship	State	Description
Dame de Coeur	unknown	The motor yacht, and former naval vessel ML 902, on a voyage from London to Zanzibar, was heavily damaged when she struck a buoy in the Thames Estuary; she was put ashore at Leigh-on-Sea.
Sea Maid	Panama	The cargo ship lost her propeller and suffered engine damage north east of Bonaire, Netherlands Antilles. She was towed in to Willemstad, where she was declared a constructive total loss. Consequently scrapped.

=== 13 January ===
List of shipwrecks: 13 January 1965
Ship	State	Description
Grand	Taiwan	The Liberty ship broke in two and foundered in the Pacific Ocean (34°15′N 145°19′E). She was on a voyage from San Francisco, California, United States to Kaohsiung.

=== 15 January ===
List of shipwrecks: 15 January 1965
Ship	State	Description
Boksetegorsk	Soviet Union	The fishing trawler sank during a gale in the Bering Sea between Saint Matthew Island and the Pribilof Islands with the loss of her entire crew of 14.

=== 17 January ===
List of shipwrecks: 17 January 1965
Ship	State	Description
Mariposa II	Liberia	The T2 tanker ran aground at Augusta, Sicily, Italy. She was being towed from Piraeus, Greece to Castellón de la Plana, Spain for scrapping. She was refloated and completed her voyage.

=== 18 January ===
List of shipwrecks: 18 January 1965
Ship	State	Description
Port Manech	France	The coastal tanker, loaded with gasoline, collided with the American C2 cargo ship Lucile Bloomfield off Le Havre and immediately caught fire, the burning wreck drifted and came ashore near Octeville where it was later scuttled. Seven occupants of the small tanker lost their lives while the Lucile Bloomfield crew escaped unharmed.

=== 20 January ===
List of shipwrecks: 20 January 1965
Ship	State	Description
Nahichevan	Soviet Union	The 125-foot (38.1 m) side trawler was lost in the Bering Sea between the Pribilof Islands and Saint Matthew Island approximately 80 nautical miles (150 km; 92 mi) northwest of Saint Paul Island during a severe storm. Fourteen crew members apparently died aboard each of the three Soviet trawlers lost during the day; two trawlers sank, and the third was found capsized with one crew member – the sole survivor from the three trawlers – clinging to it.
Sebezh	Soviet Union	The 125-foot (38.1 m) side trawler was lost in the Bering Sea between the Pribilof Islands and Saint Matthew Island approximately 80 nautical miles (150 km; 92 mi) northwest of Saint Paul Island during a severe storm. Fourteen crew members apparently died aboard each of the three Soviet trawlers lost during the day; two trawlers sank, and the third was found capsized with one crew member – the sole survivor from the three trawlers – clinging to it.
Sevsk	Soviet Union	The 125-foot (38.1 m) side trawler was lost in the Bering Sea between the Pribilof Islands and Saint Matthew Island approximately 80 nautical miles (150 km; 92 mi) northwest of Saint Paul Island during a severe storm. Fourteen crew members apparently died aboard each of the three Soviet trawlers lost during the day; two trawlers sank, and the third was found capsized with one crew member – the sole survivor from the three trawlers – clinging to it.

=== 22 January ===
List of shipwrecks: 22 January 1965
Ship	State	Description
Hindsia	United Kingdom	The tanker ran aground in the Oslo Fjord, Norway. Refloated 1 February.
San Nicola	Greece	The Liberty ship foundered in the Pacific Ocean (30°13′N 168°52′W).

=== 24 January ===
List of shipwrecks: 24 January 1965
Ship	State	Description
San Nicola	Liberia	The cargo ship sank in the Pacific 750 nautical miles (1,390 km) north west of Honolulu, Hawaii. All 30 crew rescued by Maria and taken to Japan.

=== 25 January ===
List of shipwrecks: 25 January 1965
Ship	State	Description
Queen Elizabeth	United Kingdom	The ocean liner ran aground off Cherbourg, France but was refloated undamaged shortly afterwards.

=== 28 January ===
List of shipwrecks: 28 January 1965
Ship	State	Description
Niagara	United States	The ore-oil carrier, a converted T2 tanker, suffered weather damage in the Atlantic Ocean. She was on a voyage from Nassau, Bahamas to IJmuiden, South Holland, Netherlands. She put in to Ponta Delgada, Azores, where temporary repairs were made. Later towed to Marseille, Bouches-du-Rhône, France where she was declared a constructive total loss and was consequently scrapped.

=== 29 January ===
List of shipwrecks: 29 January 1965
Ship	State	Description
Congo Moko	Belgium	Collided with Kongsvang (Norway) in the River Scheldt near Vlissingen. Repaired and returned to service.
Fleurita	United Kingdom	The dredger foundered in the Thames Estuary.

=== 31 January ===
List of shipwrecks: 31 January 1965
Ship	State	Description
Rascisce	Yugoslavia	The cargo ship sank in the Ionian Sea, all 30 crew rescued.

=== Unknown date ===
List of shipwrecks: Unknown date in January 1965
Ship	State	Description
Meracoulosa	Liberia	The T2 tanker collided with Steel Fabricator (United States) at Karachi, Pakistan and was damaged. Meracoulosa was on a voyage from Beaumont, Texas, United States to Karachi.

== February ==
=== 3 February ===
List of shipwrecks: 3 February 1965
Ship	State	Description
"Star of Freedom"	United Kingdom	The 68.9-foot (21.0 m) fishing vessel struck an object about 15 miles east southeast of Barra Head and sprung a leak. She was beached at Castlebay. Refloated and temporary repairs made, repaired and returned to service.

=== 4 February ===
List of shipwrecks: 4 February 1965
Ship	State	Description
Irini Stefanou	Liberia	The Liberty ship struck a reef off Islas San Benito, Mexico and was beached (28°18′N 114°34′W). She was refloated but declared a constructive total loss and subsequently scrapped.

=== 7 February ===
List of shipwrecks: 7 February 1965
Ship	State	Description
Grammatiki	Greece	The Liberty ship sprang a leak in the Pacific Ocean (40°38′N 159°31′W). She was on a voyage from Tacoma, Washington, United States to Formosa. She sank the next day.

=== 11 February ===
List of shipwrecks: 11 February 1965
Ship	State	Description
Collinstar	South Africa	The tug capsized and sank in Chamais Bay with the loss of all six crew.

=== 13 February ===
List of shipwrecks: 13 February 1965
Ship	State	Description
Spyros Amrenakis	Greece	The 2,065-ton collier wrecked on Nolleplaat sandbank, off Vlissingen, Zeeland, Netherlands. She was on a voyage from Immingham, Lincolnshire, United Kingdom to Terneuzen, Zeeland.

=== 16 February ===
List of shipwrecks: 16 February 1965
Ship	State	Description
C-143	Vietnam People's Navy	Vietnam War: The blockade runner was scuttled with demolition charges that blew the ship in two in Vu Rung Bay, South Vietnam, while she was under attack by a Douglas A-1 Skyraider aircraft.

=== 17 February ===
List of shipwrecks: 17 February 1965
Ship	State	Description
Normanner	Norway	Became stranded and sank on a voyage from Kopervik and Kristiansund.

=== 19 February ===
List of shipwrecks: 19 February 1965
Ship	State	Description
Sophocles	Netherlands	The cargo ship's cargo of fertilizer caught fire. The ship later capsized and sank in the Atlantic, with three of her 44 crew reported missing. Ulysees (Netherlands) rescued the other 41 crew.

=== 26 February ===
List of shipwrecks: 26 February 1965
Ship	State	Description
Ever Prosperity	Liberia	The Liberty ship ran aground at New Caledonia, a total loss.

=== 28 February ===
List of shipwrecks: 28 February 1965
Ship	State	Description
Tristein	Norway	Wrecked at Rolvsøy.

=== unknown February ===
List of shipwrecks: unknown February 1965
Ship	State	Description
Boston Pionair	United Kingdom	The 103-foot (31 m) fishing vessel vanished in a Force 10 storm off Horn Reef. She was last heard from on 13 February, debris was found on 16 February 130 miles west southwest of last known position. Lost with all hands.

== March ==
=== 9 March ===
List of shipwrecks: 9 March 1965
Ship	State	Description
Bermuda Trader	Hong Kong	The heavy lift ship ran aground near Sakata, Japan (38°57′N 130°40′E). She broke in two on 14 March and was declared a constructive total loss and was consequently scrapped.
Nicolaos P	Greece	The Liberty ship ran aground off Necochea, Argentina. Declared a constructive total loss, she was subsequently scrapped.

=== 10 March ===
List of shipwrecks: 10 March 1965
Ship	State	Description
Traveler	United States	The 9-gross register ton, 39.8-foot (12.1 m) fishing vessel was destroyed by fire at Klawock, Alaska.

=== 11 March ===
List of shipwrecks: 11 March 1965
Ship	State	Description
Master Elias	Liberia	Stranded on Burias Island, Philippines. Refloated 15 March and towed to Manila, where sold for scrapping.

=== 19 March ===
List of shipwrecks: 19 March 1965
Ship	State	Description
Delwind	United Kingdom	The cargo ship ran aground on the Bombay Reef, 380 nautical miles (700 km) south of Hong Kong. She was on a voyage from Hong Kong to Thailand. She was refloated on 7 April with the assistance of a salvage tug, but grounded again. She was declared a constructive total loss.
Roland L	Belgium	Collided at Antwerp with Santos (Sweden) and sank. Raised on 26 March, repaired and returned to service in July 1965.

=== 26 March ===
List of shipwrecks: 26 March 1965
Ship	State	Description
Empire Demon	United Kingdom	The tug collided with the tanker Norse Lion (Norway) and was severely damaged. She was declared a constructive total loss and consequently scrapped.

=== 27 March ===
List of shipwrecks: 27 March 1965
Ship	State	Description
Nora	Norway	The tanker collided with Otto N. Miller (Liberia) in the English Channel. Both ships caught fire and there was a large spill of oil.

=== 29 March ===
List of shipwrecks: 29 March 1965
Ship	State	Description
Katharina Kolkmann	West Germany	The cargo ship collided with Gannet (United Kingdom): and sank in the English Channel 5 nautical miles (9.3 km) off Folkestone, Kent with the loss of one of the fifteen crew.

== April ==
=== 4 April ===
List of shipwrecks: 4 April 1965
Ship	State	Description
Nan An	Panama	The cargo ship ran aground off Hong Kong (22°24′N 114°24′E) and broke up. All 41 crew were rescued. The wreck was looted and set afire. She was on a voyage from Kaohsiung, Taiwan to Hong Kong.

=== 6 April ===
List of shipwrecks: 6 April 1965
Ship	State	Description
Cagliari	Italy	The cargo ship ran aground in the River Thames and Gravesend, Kent in fog.

=== 11 April ===
List of shipwrecks: 11 April 1965
Ship	State	Description
Transatlantic	West Germany	The cargo ship collided with Hermes (Netherlands) and sank in the Saint Lawrence River, Canada. One of her fourteen crew was killed and two were reported missing.

=== 13 April ===
List of shipwrecks: 13 April 1965
Ship	State	Description
Bremerhaven	West Germany	The passenger ship capsized and sank at Bremerhaven.

=== 27 April ===
List of shipwrecks: 27 April 1965
Ship	State	Description
Orient Merchant	Greece	The cargo liner ran aground in Lake Erie near Port Colborne, Ontario, Canada. She was refloated on 8 May. Although declared a constructive total loss, she was sold and returned to service.

=== 28 April ===
List of shipwrecks: 28 April 1965
Ship	State	Description
T-161	Vietnam People's Navy	Vietnam War: The Type 55A gunboat was sunk by Douglas AD-6 and United States Air Force Republic F-105 Thunderchief aircraft at Song Gianh, South Vietnam.
T-163	Vietnam People's Navy	Vietnam War: The Type 55A gunboat was sunk by Douglas AD-6 and United States Air Force Republic F-105 Thunderchief aircraft at Song Gianh, South Vietnam.
T-173	Vietnam People's Navy	Vietnam War: The Type 55A gunboat was sunk by Douglas AD-6 and United States Air Force Republic F-105 Thunderchief aircraft at Song Gianh, South Vietnam.

=== 29 April ===
List of shipwrecks: 29 April 1965
Ship	State	Description
Parks No. 5	United States	The 7-gross register ton, 29.5-foot (9.0 m) motor vessel sank at Port Lions, Alaska.

=== 30 April ===
List of shipwrecks: 30 April 1965
Ship	State	Description
King Abdelaziz	Saudi Arabia	The passenger ship ran aground on the Algaham Reef, 5 nautical miles (9.3 km) west of Jeddah. All on board were rescued.

=== Unknown date ===
List of shipwrecks: Unknown date June 1969
Ship	State	Description
Becky Thatcher	United States	The riverboat, operating as an entertainment venue, sank on the Mississippi River at St. Louis, Missouri, during the spring flood. Her steel hull was refloated and put into service as a landing barge for a new stationary showboat, also named Becky Thatcher (United States).

== May ==
=== 2 May ===
List of shipwrecks: 2 May 1965
Ship	State	Description
Rea	United States	The 9-gross register ton, 31.5-foot (9.6 m) fishing vessel collided with an unidentified object and was lost in Sukoi Bay north of Cape Douglas (58°52′N 153°16′W) in Cook Inlet on the south-central coast of Alaska.

=== 5 May ===
List of shipwrecks: 5 May 1965
Ship	State	Description
Mecca	United Arab Republic	The passenger ship collided with Fremantle Star (United Kingdom) in the Gulf of Suez and was damaged. Mecca was consequently withdrawn from service and laid up.

=== 7 May ===
List of shipwrecks: 7 May 1965
Ship	State	Description
Kitak	Norway	The sealer foundered in the Norwegian Sea. She was on a voyage from the West Ice to Ålesund.
Cedarville	United States	During a voyage from Rogers City, Michigan, to Gary, Indiana, with a cargo of 14,411 long tons (14,642 t; 16,140 short tons) of limestone, the 588.3-foot (179.3 m), 8,575-gross register ton bulk carrier sank after colliding with the motor vessel Topdalsfjord (Norway) in the Straits of Mackinac 1 nautical mile (1.9 km) east of the Mackinac Bridge, killing 10 of her 35 crew members.

=== 8 May ===
List of shipwrecks: 8 May 1965
Ship	State	Description
Northland	United States	The motor vessel sank off Baranof Island in the Alexander Archipelago in Southeast Alaska.

=== 9 May ===
List of shipwrecks: 9 May 1965
Ship	State	Description
Pal	United States	The 7-gross register ton, 32-foot (9.8 m) fishing vessel sank near Saint Joseph Island (55°36′N 133°43′W) in Southeast Alaska.
Tassia	Greece	The Liberty ship sank in the Atlantic Ocean off Cape Race, Newfoundland, Canada (36°36′N 51°24′W).

=== 18 May ===
List of shipwrecks: 18 May 1965
Ship	State	Description
Cedar	United States	The 32-gross register ton, 43.5-foot (13.3 m) fishing vessel was lost off Kodiak, Alaska.

=== 23 May ===
List of shipwrecks: 23 May 1965
Ship	State	Description
Heimvard	Norway	The tanker exploded and caught fire at Mururan, Japan. Three of her crew were killed, 22 were injured, five others reported missing.

=== 26 May ===
List of shipwrecks: 26 May 1965
Ship	State	Description
Meracoulosa	Liberia	The T2 tanker ran aground on the Buffalo Rock, off Pulo Bukom, Indonesia (1°08′N 103°49′E) and was severely damaged. She was on a voyage from Palembang to Dumai. She was refloated on 29 May and towed to Singapore. She was declared uneconomic to repair and was consequently scrapped.
T-136	Vietnam People's Navy	Vietnam War: The Type 55A gunboat was sunk by aircraft at Lach Troung, South Vietnam. Seven crewmen were killed.

=== 28 May ===
List of shipwrecks: 28 May 1965
Ship	State	Description
La Salle	Monrovia	The ship struck the Grunes de L'Ouest rocks (49.29209N 02.39333W) between Guernsey and Jersey Channel Islands. 40 people were rescued by the Guernsey lifeboat.

=== 29 May ===
List of shipwrecks: 29 May 1965
Ship	State	Description
San Carlos	(United Kingdom) Dominica	The tanker was driven ashore and wrecked at Rio Haina.

=== Unknown date ===
List of shipwrecks: Unknown date 1965
Ship	State	Description
Mount McKinley	United States	The 39-gross register ton, 60-foot (18.3 m) barge sank off Seldovia, Alaska.
Yousuf Baksh	Pakistan	The steam cargo ship caught fire in the English Channel, becoming a total loss.

== June ==
=== 4 June ===
List of shipwrecks: 4 June 1965
Ship	State	Description
Pendennis Castle	United Kingdom	The ocean liner ran aground in Southampton Water. Refloated undamaged after 4½ hours.

=== 6 June ===
List of shipwrecks: 6 June 1965
Ship	State	Description
Luisa	Italy	The tanker exploded and caught fire at Bandar Mashar, Iran, killing 30 of her 41 crew, and two others onshore. The ship capsized and sank in shallow water.
Normanby Hall	United Kingdom	The collier ran aground off Tara, County Down. She was on a voyage from Birkenhead, Cheshire to Belfast, County Antrim. She was refloated and taken in tow for Belfast in a severely leaky condition but consequently foundered in the Belfast Lough on 8 June.

=== 16 June ===
List of shipwrecks: 16 June 1965
Ship	State	Description
USS Hartley	United States Navy	The Dealey-class destroyer collided with the Liberty ship Dicoronia (Liberia) off Cape Henry, Virginia and was severely damaged.

=== 17 June ===
List of shipwrecks: 17 June 1965
Ship	State	Description
Bluebell	United States	The 14-gross register ton, 35.4-foot (10.8 m) fishing vessel sank at Whale Pass, Alaska.

=== 27 June ===
List of shipwrecks: 27 June 1965
Ship	State	Description
Polly	United States	The 12-gross register ton, 33.5-foot (10.2 m) fishing vessel sank in Cook Inlet approximately 5 nautical miles (9.3 km; 5.8 mi) north of Anchor Point, Alaska.

=== 29 June ===
List of shipwrecks: 29 June 1965
Ship	State	Description
Thrasyvoulos	Greece	The Liberty ship was reported to be leaking 750 nautical miles (1,390 km) south east of Aden. She was on a voyage from Madras, India to Constanța, Bulgaria. No further trace, presumed foundered.

== July ==
=== 1 July ===
List of shipwrecks: 1 July 1965
Ship	State	Description
Thrasyvoulos	Greece	The Liberty ship sank in the Arabian Sea off Abd al Kuri, South Yemen. Crew abandoned ship and landed on the island, from where their distress calls were answered by RAF Shackleton aircraft and HMS Zulu (Royal Navy).

=== 13 July ===
List of shipwrecks: 13 July 1965
Ship	State	Description
HMS Tiptoe	Royal Navy	The T-class submarine collided with HMS Yarmouth (Royal Navy) in the English Channel 10 nautical miles (19 km) south of Portland Bill, Dorset.

=== 14 July ===
List of shipwrecks: 14 July 1965
Ship	State	Description
Zoe	Greece	The Liberty ship struck a submerged object off the coast of Brazil (33°03′S 72°27′W) and sprang a leak. She was declared a constructive total loss.

=== 15 July ===
List of shipwrecks: 15 July 1965
Ship	State	Description
Jag Sevak	India	The cargo ship ran aground at Visakhaptnam and was severely damaged. She was declared a constructive total loss. She subsequently broke in two. The wreck was towed out to sea and scuttled.

=== 17 July ===
List of shipwrecks: 17 July 1965
Ship	State	Description
Alaska Queen	United States	The 40-gross register ton, 61.4-foot (18.7 m) tug was destroyed off Rocky Point in Bechevin Bay (52°03′N 175°06′W) on the coast of Atka Island in the Aleutian Islands by a fire that broke out in her engine room. Her crew of three abandoned ship in a skiff and survived.

=== 18 July ===
List of shipwrecks: 18 July 1965
Ship	State	Description
Avra	Greece	The Liberty ship was abandoned 140 nautical miles (260 km) north of Cochin, India. She sank the next day.
USS Frank Knox	United States Navy	USS Frank Knox aground. The Gearing-class destroyer ran aground in the South China Sea on Pratas Reef near Pratas Island. She was salvaged and repaired and eventually returned to service.
Pen 38	United States	A storm destroyed the 8-gross register ton 28.6-foot (8.7 m) fishing vessel at Port Moller (59°59′30″N 160°34′30″W), Alaska.

=== 20 July ===
List of shipwrecks: 20 July 1965
Ship	State	Description
Napier Star	United Kingdom	The cargo ship ran aground off Bahia Potrero, Uruguay. She was on a voyage from the Gallegos River to London. She was refloated on 18 August but was declared a constructive total loss. She was scrapped in February 1966.

=== 21 July ===
List of shipwrecks: 21 July 1965
Ship	State	Description
Orient Trader	Greece	The Victory ship caught fire at Toronto, Ontario, Canada and was severely damaged. She was declared a constructive total loss and was consequently scrapped.

=== 22 July ===
List of shipwrecks: 22 July 1965
Ship	State	Description
Mariviki	Liberia	The cargo ship sprang a leak and was beached near Mormugao, India (15°11′N 73°55′E). She was on a voyage from Madras, India to Constanţa, Romania. She broke in two the next day and was a total loss.

=== 27 July ===
List of shipwrecks: 27 July 1965
Ship	State	Description
Diana	United States	The 7-gross register ton, 30.3-foot (9.2 m) fishing vessel was destroyed by fire in Taku Inlet in Southeast Alaska.

=== 31 July ===
List of shipwrecks: 31 July 1965
Ship	State	Description
Eagle	United States	The 10-gross register ton, 32.3-foot (9.8 m) fishing vessel suffered an explosion, burned, and sank at Sitka, Alaska.

=== Unknown date ===
List of shipwrecks: Unknown date 1965
Ship	State	Description
Warrior	United States	The 7-gross register ton, 34.2-foot (10.4 m) motor vessel was destroyed by a storm at St. Michael, Alaska.

== August ==
=== 1 August ===
List of shipwrecks: 1 August 1965
Ship	State	Description
Samson II	United States	The motor vessel was destroyed by fire 3.5 nautical miles (6.5 km; 4.0 mi) north of Sitka, Alaska.
Sea Maid	United States	The 8-gross register ton, 28.7-foot (8.7 m) fishing vessel was destroyed by fire at the Arctic Maid Fisheries warehouse at Naknek, Alaska.

=== 2 August ===
List of shipwrecks: 2 August 1965
Ship	State	Description
Leucoton	Chilean Navy	The lighthouse tender, a converted naval tugboat, was wrecked during a storm in the Bahia San Pedro, 60 nautical miles (110 km) south of Corral, Chile, when her anchor chain broke.
Meiko Maru	Japan	The tanker collided with Arizona (United States) 100 nautical miles (190 km) south of Tokyo and sank with the loss of 18 crew.

=== 6 August ===
List of shipwrecks: 6 August 1965
Ship	State	Description
ROCS Jian Men	Republic of China Navy	Chinese Civil War: Battle of Dongshan: The Chien Men-class patrol ship was damaged by Red Chinese patrol ships and then was torpedoed and sunk south of Quemoy by No. 119 ( (China) People's Liberation Army Navy).
ROCS Zhang Jiang	Republic of China Navy	Chinese Civil War: Battle of Dongshan: The Qing Jiong-class submarine chaser was shelled and sunk south of Quemoy by No. 611 ( (China) People's Liberation Army Navy).

=== 15 August ===
List of shipwrecks: 15 August 1965
Ship	State	Description
Barbara	United States	The 12-gross register ton, 29.7-foot (9.1 m) fishing vessel was destroyed by fire at Naknek, Alaska.
Cathy Joy	United States	The 12-gross register ton, 29.7-foot (9.1 m) fishing vessel was destroyed by fire at Naknek, Alaska.
Edith	United States	The 9-gross register ton, 28.7-foot (8.7 m) fishing vessel was destroyed by fire at Naknek, Alaska.
Janie	United States	The 12-gross register ton, 29.7-foot (9.1 m) fishing vessel was destroyed by fire at Naknek, Alaska.
Janequeo	Chilean Navy	The tug sank during a storm in the Bay of Manquemapu, 60 nautical miles (110 km) south of Corral, Chile, with the loss of 51 men while trying to assist Leucotón, which had run aground.
Laurie	United States	The 12-gross register ton, 29.7-foot (9.1 m) fishing vessel was destroyed by fire at Naknek, Alaska.
Peggy	United States	The 9-gross register ton, 28.6-foot (8.7 m) fishing vessel was destroyed by fire at Naknek, Alaska.
Suzie	United States	The 12-gross register ton, 29.7-foot (9.1 m) fishing vessel was destroyed by fire at Naknek, Alaska.

=== 20 August ===
List of shipwrecks: 20 August 1965
Ship	State	Description
Iola	United States	A storm destroyed the 13-gross register ton, 34.1-foot (10.4 m) fishing vessel at Carroll Inlet (55°17′N 131°30′W) in Southeast Alaska.

=== 22 August ===
List of shipwrecks: 22 August 1965
Ship	State	Description
S B P Co. No. 12	United States	The 38-gross register ton, 49-foot (14.9 m) barge was destroyed by fire at Kenai, Alaska.

=== 23 August ===
List of shipwrecks: 23 August 1965
Ship	State	Description
Kathe Niederkirchner	East Germany	The cargo ship ran aground on Muckle Skerry, in the Pentland Firth, Scotland. All fifty on board survived.

=== 25 August ===
List of shipwrecks: 25 August 1965
Ship	State	Description
Maria	United States	The 8-gross register ton, 28.7-foot (8.7 m) fishing vessel was destroyed by fire at Naknek, Alaska.
Sauveur	United States	The 8-gross register ton, 28.4-foot (8.7 m) fishing vessel was destroyed by fire at Naknek, Alaska.
Two Johns	United States	The 8-gross register ton, 28.7-foot (8.7 m) fishing vessel was destroyed by fire at Naknek, Alaska.
Vagabond	United States	The 8-gross register ton 28.4-foot (8.7 m) wooden fishing vessel was destroyed by fire at Naknek, Alaska.

=== 28 August ===
List of shipwrecks: 28 August 1965
Ship	State	Description
Isla N	United States	The 11-gross register ton 30.8-foot (9.4 m) fishing vessel sank in Monashka Bay (57°50′N 152°25′W) on the south-central coast of Alaska.

=== 30 August ===
List of shipwrecks: 30 August 1965
Ship	State	Description
Arsinoe	France	Stranded on the Scarborough Reef (15°10′N 117°40′E). Broke in two on 2 September and sank.

=== 31 August ===
List of shipwrecks: 30 August 1965
Ship	State	Description
T-181	Vietnam People's Navy	Vietnam War: The Type 55A gunboat was sunk by aircraft at Ben Thuy, South Vietnam.

== September ==
=== 2 September ===
List of shipwrecks: 2 September 1965
Ship	State	Description
Maxine	United States	The motor vessel was destroyed by fire on the Copper River Flats southeast of Cordova, Alaska.

=== 7 September ===
List of shipwrecks: 7 September 1965
Ship	State	Description
Amaryllis	Panama	Amaryllis The cargo ship ran aground at Riviera Beach, Florida, overnight on 7–8 September during Hurricane Betsy. Later refloated and scuttled in August 1968 to form an artificial reef.

=== 9 September ===
List of shipwrecks: 9 September 1965
Ship	State	Description
Aeakos	Greece	The cargo ship ran aground in the South China Sea north west of Borneo (5°07′N 112°33′E) and was abandoned. She was seized by pirates on 5 December and salvage efforts were abandoned.
USS AFDM-2	United States Navy	Hurricane Betsy: The auxiliary floating drydock broke loose from her moorings at Todd Shipyards and blew upstream three miles (4.8 km). The vessel then capsized and sank in the Mississippi River 300 feet (91 m) off the Mandeville and Press Street wharves. The drydock was raised on 25 August 1966.
Bowqueen	United Kingdom	The dredger capsized and sank off Clacton-on-Sea, Essex with the loss of four of her seven crew.
Elizabeth Lykes	United States	Hurricane Betsy: The incomplete Louise Lykes-class cargo ship was in the auxiliary floating drydock USS AFDM-2 (United States Navy) when the drydock broke loose from her mooring at Todd Shipyards and was pushed upstream. Elizabeth Lykes eventually drifted out of the drydock and went ashore 3 1/2 miles (5.6 km) north of the shipyard, off the Dumaine Street Wharf.
Genevieve Lykes	United States	Hurricane Betsy: The incomplete Louise Lykes-class cargo ship was blown upriver from her moorings at Avondale Shipyards and sank in the Mississippi River at about Mile 115.4 above the Head of Passes, approximately two miles (3.2 km) south of New Orleans International Airport.
USS Keller	United States Navy	Hurricane Betsy: The incomplete Keller-class hydrographic survey ship was struck by a cargo ship and crane barge, broke loose from her moorings at New Orleans, and struck by other vessels as she blew upstream 900 yards (820 m). The vessel capsized and sank in shallow water, partially above water in the Mississippi River. Salvage began on 27 September and the ship was raised on 10 November 1965.
Letitia Lykes	United States	Hurricane Betsy: The incomplete Louise Lykes-class cargo ship was blown upriver from her moorings at Avondale Shipyards and sank in the Mississippi River at about Mile 115.4 above the Head of Passes, approximately two miles (3.2 km) south of New Orleans International Airport with Genevieve Lykes on top of her.
Maverick	United States	Hurricane Betsy: The state-of-the art jackup drilling rig owned by the Zapata Corp. was destroyed in the Gulf of Mexico off Louisiana.
MTC-602	United States	The barge sank in the Mississippi River during Hurricane Betsy. It was raised on 12 November 1965.
Platform A and Platform B	United States	Hurricane Betsy: The Gulf Oil Company's two oil drilling platforms were destroyed in the Gulf of Mexico off Louisiana.

=== 10 September ===
List of shipwrecks: 10 September 1965
Ship	State	Description
Everbloom	Liberia	The cargo ship was driven ashore at Wakanoura, Japan in a typhoon. She was on a voyage from Kure to Wakayama, Japan. She was refloated but was declared a constructive total loss and consequently scrapped.
Wake Forest Victory	United States	Hurricane Betsy: The Victory ship was driven from her moorings at New Orleans, Louisiana. She collided with Managua (Nicaragua), Ondine (Liberia) and Witmarsum (Netherlands) and was severely damaged.
Winner	Liberia	The Liberty ship was driven ashore at Wakayama in a typhoon. She was declared a constructive total loss.

=== 14 September ===
List of shipwrecks: 14 September 1965
Ship	State	Description
Fort William	Canada	The package carrier exploded and sank at Montreal, Quebec after an unbalanced load caused the ship to capsize, letting aerosolized calcium chloride powder to become exposed to water. The ship was raised and returned to service in May 1966.
Yewgarth	United Kingdom	The tug was crushed against the quayside at Cardiff, Glamorgan by Aldersgate (United Kingdom). Yewgarth was beached in a sinking condition and was declared a constructive total loss. She was refloated on 20 September and subsequently scrapped.

=== 20 September ===
List of shipwrecks: 20 September 1965
Ship	State	Description
Eretto	Italy	The Liberty ship ran aground in the Sakhalin Islands, Soviet Union and broke in two, a total loss.

=== 22 September ===
List of shipwrecks: 22 September 1965
Ship	State	Description
Tactician	United Kingdom	The cargo ship caught fire off Canvey Island, Essex whilst laden with explosives. Ship flooded during firefighting operations.

=== 23 September ===
List of shipwrecks: 23 September 1965
Ship	State	Description
Esso Wandsworth	United Kingdom	The tanker collided with Moerdyk (Netherlands) in the River Thames. She was on a voyage from Thames Haven, Essex to Dartford, Kent. Declared a constructive total loss, she was scrapped.

=== 26 September ===
List of shipwrecks: 26 September 1965
Ship	State	Description
Albin Köbis	Volksmarine	The decommissioned training ship was sunk as a target off "Rosenort".
Nadezhda Krupskaya	Soviet Union	The cruise ship ran aground off Stockholm, Sweden. All 94 passengers returned to Stockholm by a Swedish ship.

=== 28 September ===
List of shipwrecks: 28 September 1965
Ship	State	Description
Sir Joseph Rawlinson	United Kingdom	Sank after a collision with a hopper barge. Ten crew were rescued by the tug Danube VIII, but nine others died. Raised in 1966.

=== 30 September ===
List of shipwrecks: 30 September 1965
Ship	State	Description
Protostatis	Greece	The Liberty ship ran aground in Lake Ontario. She was on a voyage from Detroit, Michigan, United States to Genoa, Italy. She was refloated on 12 October and towed in to Kingston, Ontario, Canada.
Transcaribbean	United States	The Victory ship was driven ashore at Bermuda in a storm.

=== Unknown date ===
List of shipwrecks: unknown date in September 1965
Ship	State	Description
Agia Thalassina	Liberia	The Liberty ship ran aground and was severely damaged. She was on a voyage from Necochea, Argentina to Civitavecchia, Italy. She was refloated and put in to Montevideo, Uruguay on 25 September. She was laid up unrepaired and was scrapped in September 1968.

== October ==
=== 5 October ===
List of shipwrecks: 5 October 1965
Ship	State	Description
Fairweather	United States	The 73-gross register ton, 70-foot (21.3 m) fishing vessel was wrecked at the head of "American Bay" – probably American Bay on Dall Island in the Alexander Archipelago in Southeast Alaska, but possibly American Bay on the Alaska Peninsula – in Alaska.

=== 6 October ===
List of shipwrecks: 6 October 1965
Ship	State	Description
Dina	Denmark	The coaster ran aground off the Mull of Kintyre, Scotland. Refloated the next day.

=== 8 October ===
List of shipwrecks: 8 October 1965
Ship	State	Description
Cities Service Baltimore	United States	The tanker ran aground in Boston Harbor, Massachusetts.
SAS Fleur	South African Navy	The decommissioned boom defence vessel was sunk as a naval gunnery target in False Bay off Simon's Town, South Africa.
Normanby Hall	United Kingdom	The coaster sank in Belfast Lough. All crew rescued.

=== 10 October ===
List of shipwrecks: 10 October 1965
Ship	State	Description
G P C 21	United States	The 15-gross register ton, 34.2-foot (10.4 m) fishing vessel was destroyed by a storm at Ouzinkie, Alaska.

=== 11 October ===
List of shipwrecks: 11 October 1965
Ship	State	Description
Nerée	France	The coaster sank 10 nautical miles (19 km) off Cherbourg, the loss of six of her 25 crew.

=== 16 October ===
List of shipwrecks: 16 October 1965
Ship	State	Description
Akti	Greece	The cargo ship caught fire in the Nieuwe Waterweg. She was towed in to the Europoort, South Holland, Netherlands and was beached. Akti was on a voyage from Assab, Ethiopia to Copenhagen, Denmark. The fire was extinguished the next day but she later capsized. She was righted on 6 October 1966 but declared a constructive total loss and was consequently scrapped.

=== 17 October ===
List of shipwrecks: 17 October 1965
Ship	State	Description
Ekaterini G	Greece	The Liberty ship was driven ashore on Great Sitkin Island, Alaska, United States. She was abandoned as a constructive total loss.

=== 18 October ===
List of shipwrecks: 18 October 1965
Ship	State	Description
Marlin	Liberia	The cargo ship foundered in the North Atlantic Ocean 120 nautical miles (220 km) east of Cape Fear, North Carolina, United States (34°38′N 75°32′W), after her cargo shifted. She was on a voyage from Tampa, Florida, United States to Port Williams, Nova Scotia, Canada.

=== 22 October ===
List of shipwrecks: 22 October 1965
Ship	State	Description
Jessel	United States	The 16-gross register ton, 36.7-foot (11.2 m) fishing vessel was destroyed by fire at Gould Island (55°17′N 132°36′W) off Prince of Wales Island in the Alexander Archipelago in Southeast Alaska.
Tradeways II	Liberia	The Liberty ship broke in two in the Atlantic Ocean (49°58′N 25°40′W). The bow section sank that day, the stern section sank the next day. She was on a voyage from Antwerp, Belgium to Montreal, Quebec, Canada.

=== 26 October ===
List of shipwrecks: 26 October 1965
Ship	State	Description
Ekaterini G	Greece	Under tow by the tug Tawakoni (flag unknown) after losing her propeller in the North Pacific Ocean 500 nautical miles (930 km; 580 mi) south of Adak, Alaska, the converted Liberty ship was wrecked on Great Sitkin Island in the Aleutian Islands with the loss of one crew member after her towline parted during a storm and she drifted ashore. United States Navy helicopters rescued the rest of her crew.

=== 27 October ===
List of shipwrecks: 27 October 1965
Ship	State	Description
Panagathos	Liberia	The Liberty ship was driven ashore on Ameland, Friesland, Netherlands. She was on a voyage from Hamburg, West Germany to an American port. She was declared a constructive total loss. Her wreck was scrapped in situ in 1970.

=== 29 October ===
List of shipwrecks: 29 October 1965
Ship	State	Description
Success	United States	The 57-gross register ton, 62.1-foot (18.9 m) fishing vessel was destroyed by fire at Japanese Bay (56°56′N 153°41′W) on the coast of Kodiak Island. The fishing vessel Brisk (United States) rescued her entire crew of three.

=== 30 October ===
List of shipwrecks: 30 October 1965
Ship	State	Description
Christiakis	Greece	The coaster collided with Mairoula (Greece) off Nara Burnu, Turkey and was beached. Christiakis was on a voyage from Galaţi, Romania to Alexandria, Egypt. She was refloated on 15 November. Declared a constructive total loss, she was subsequently beached at Ambeliki.

== November ==
=== 1 November ===
List of shipwrecks: 1 November 1965
Ship	State	Description
Artemon	United Kingdom	The cargo ship caught fire at Piraeus, Greece. She was on a voyage from Cebu, Philippines to Rotterdam, South Holland, Netherlands. She was beached in Ambeliki Bay on 6 November. The fire was extinguished on 8 November but she was declared a constructive total loss and consequently scrapped.

=== 2 November ===
List of shipwrecks: 2 November 1965
Ship	State	Description
Paget Trader	United Kingdom	The Liberty ship caught fire in the Indian Ocean. She put in to Singapore on 6 November. Subsequently laid up a Hong Kong, she was scrapped in 1966.
Panagathos	Greece	The Liberty ship ran aground north of Ameland, Friesland, Netherlands and was wrecked. All 33 crew rescued.

=== 3 November ===
List of shipwrecks: 3 November 1965
Ship	State	Description
Fosming	China (Taiwan)	The Liberty ship ran aground on Castle Island, Bahamas. She was later refloated and towed to Philadelphia, Pennsylvania, United States where she was declared at constructive total loss.

=== 7 November ===
List of shipwrecks: 7 November 1965
Ship	State	Description
Craig Foss	United States	The 179-gross register ton, 88-foot (26.8 m) tug sank in Cook Inlet on the south-central coast of Alaska. Her entire crew of 10 survived.

=== 8 November ===
List of shipwrecks: 8 November 1965
Ship	State	Description
Bianca Venture	Liberia	The cargo ship ran aground 40 nautical miles (74 km) north of Mukho, South Korea (38°09′N 128°36′E). She broke in two three days later, a total loss.

=== 13 November ===
List of shipwrecks: 13 November 1965
Ship	State	Description
ROCS Lin Huai	Republic of China Navy	Chinese Civil War: Battle of Chongwu: The Zhen Nan-class minesweeper was damaged by shelling by People's Liberation Army Navy patrol ships and then was torpedoed by the motor torpedo boat No. 145 ( (China) People's Liberation Army Navy). She was then beached on Magong Island to prevent her from sinking.
Reina	United States	The 94-gross register ton motor vessel sank at "Segum Island", probably Seguam Island in the Andreanof Islands group in the Aleutian Islands.
Yarmouth Castle	Panama	The passenger liner burned and sank in the Atlantic Ocean off Miami, Florida, with the loss of 90 lives.

=== 14 November ===
List of shipwrecks: 14 November 1965
Ship	State	Description
ROCS Yung Chang	Republic of China Navy	Chinese Civil War: The Zhen Nan-class minesweeper was sunk off the South China coast by a People's Liberation Army Navy escort vessel.

=== 16 November ===
List of shipwrecks: 16 November 1965
Ship	State	Description
Lief H	United States	The fishing vessel grounded on a shoal and sank with the loss of two lives near Channel Light 32A in Wrangell Narrows in the Alexander Archipelago in Southeast Alaska.
Protostatis	Greece	The Liberty ship ran aground on Wolf Island in the Saint Lawrence River and was abandoned. She was declared a constructive total loss. She was being towed from Kingston, Ontario, Canada to Genoa, Italy. She was refloated on 31 January 1966 and consequently scrapped.

=== 18 November ===
List of shipwrecks: 18 November 1965
Ship	State	Description
Beverwijk 30	Netherlands	The dredger ran aground off Tynemouth, Northumberland, United Kingdom. Refloated on 6 February 1966.

=== 19 November ===
List of shipwrecks: 19 November 1965
Ship	State	Description
Banora	Morocco	The cargo ship foundered while under tow off Cape Villano, Spain.

=== 21 November ===
List of shipwrecks: 21 November 1965
Ship	State	Description
Achilles	Greece	The Liberty ship ran aground at Muroran, Japan. She was refloated on 2 December and declared a constructive total loss.

=== 22 November ===
List of shipwrecks: 22 November 1965
Ship	State	Description
Tyke	United States	A storm destroyed the motor vessel in Southeast Alaska in Shakan Strait (56°07′30″N 133°30′00″W) on the northwest coast of Prince of Wales Island in the Alexander Archipelago.

=== 23 November ===
List of shipwrecks: 23 November 1965
Ship	State	Description
Elmira B	United States	The 8-gross register ton, 28.4-foot (8.7 m) fishing vessel sank in Sumner Strait in the Alexander Archipelago in Southeast Alaska.
Maumee Sun	United States	The T1 tanker collided with American Pilot (United States) off the entrance to the Cape Cod Canal. She was subsequently towed in to Bedford, Massachusetts. Declared uneconomic to repair, she was laid up. Maumee Sun was scrapped in 1972.

=== 24 November ===
List of shipwrecks: 24 November 1965
Ship	State	Description
Ping An	Liberia	The cargo ship was driven ashore at Ter Heijde, South Holland, Netherlands. All 49 crew were rescued. The ship was declared a constructive total loss and scrapped in situ.
Santa Kyriaki	Liberia	Santa Kyriaki The 2,958-ton cargo ship beached south of IJmuiden, Netherlands. Refloated on 8 March 1966 but declared a constructive total loss. Scrapped in July 1966.

=== 26 November ===
List of shipwrecks: 26 November 1965
Ship	State	Description
Oduna	United States	The 7,252-gross register ton, 422-foot (128.6 m) Liberty ship was wrecked in heavy seas on rocks at Cape Pankof on the east coast of Unimak Island in the Aleutian Islands. Her crew survived and was evacuated by helicopter and breeches buoy to the medium endurance cutter USCGC Storis ( United States Coast Guard) and the tug Adeline Foss (United States), with assistance by the United States Fish and Wildlife Service Bureau of Commercial Fisheries cargo liner US FWS Pribilof (United States).

=== 27 November ===
List of shipwrecks: 27 November 1965
Ship	State	Description
Achilles	Greece	The Liberty ship ran aground at Muroran, Hokkaido, Japan. She was declared a constructive total loss.

=== 28 November ===
List of shipwrecks: 28 November 1965
Ship	State	Description
Blue Fin	Spain	The cargo ship sank in the Bay of Biscay whilst under tow following the loss of her rudder. The accident was caused by her cargo shifting.

=== Unknown date ===
List of shipwrecks: Unknown date 1965
Ship	State	Description
Mabel M	United States	The 10-gross register ton, 31.9-foot (9.7 m) fishing vessel sank at Grave Island (58°06′35″N 135°27′15″W) off Hoonah, Alaska.
Romanoff	United States	The 114-gross register ton, 83.9-foot (25.6 m) barge was destroyed by a storm near St. Michael, Alaska.

== December ==
=== 1 December ===
List of shipwrecks: 1 December 1965
Ship	State	Description
Bear Bait	United States	The 10-gross register ton, 33-foot (10.1 m) fishing vessel was destroyed by a storm at Uyak (57°38′20″N 154°00′00″W) on the coast of Kodiak Island in Alaska.

=== 4 December ===
List of shipwrecks: 4 December 1965
Ship	State	Description
Pawtucket	United States	While towing a 200-foot (61.0 m) barge from Seward to Cold Bay, Alaska, the 141-gross register ton, 97.6-foot (29.7 m) motor tug burned near "Otter Island" – probably a reference to Outer Island (59°21′N 150°25′W) – in Nuka Bay on the south-central coast of Alaska after an engine room fire spread out of control. Her crew of four abandoned ship in a skiff and rowed to the barge, from which the buoy tender USCGC Sorrel ( United States Coast Guard) rescued them.

=== 13 December ===
List of shipwrecks: 13 December 1965
Ship	State	Description
Vesper	Panama	The Liberty ship caught fire and was abandoned in the Mediterranean Sea (37°00′N 1°38′W). She was towed to Cartagena, Spain where she was declared a constructive total loss.

=== 18 December ===
List of shipwrecks: 18 December 1965
Ship	State	Description
Ronnie M	United States	During a voyage from Juneau to Kodiak, Alaska, the 196-gross register ton, 89.6-foot (27.3 m) fishing vessel was last heard from on this date while in the Gulf of Alaska off Cape Saint Elias on the southwest end of Kayak Island on the south-central coast of Alaska. She then disappeared with the loss of her entire five-man crew.

=== 22 December ===
List of shipwrecks: 22 December 1965
Ship	State	Description
Papadiamandis	Liberia	The bulk carrier, a converted T2 tanker, ran aground off the Faja Grande Lighthouse, Flores Island, Azores, Portugal . She was on a voyage from New Orleans, Louisiana, United States to Hamburg, West Germany. She broke in three on 27 December and was a total loss.

=== 24 December ===
List of shipwrecks: 24 December 1965
Ship	State	Description
Gertrud C Ertel	West Germany	The cargo ship ran aground at Falsterbo, Sweden and broke in two. Declared a constructive total loss. Refloated in July 1968, cargo discharged and subsequently scrapped the following month.

=== 27 December ===
List of shipwrecks: 27 December 1965
Ship	State	Description
Noemi	Lebanon	The cargo ship ran aground off Ras Abu ar Rasas, Oman and was abandoned by her crew. She was on a voyage from Matanzas, Cuba to Basra, Iraq. She was declared a constructive total loss.

=== 30 December ===
List of shipwrecks: 30 December 1965
Ship	State	Description
Singo	Norway	The coastal tanker collided with Fina Two (Belgium) and sank in the Scheldt with the loss of four crew.

== Unknown date ==
List of shipwrecks: Unknown date 1965
Ship	State	Description
Banjul	United Kingdom	The VIC-type lighter was reported to have been scuttled.
Cindy W	United States	The 45-foot (13.7 m) fishing vessel was wrecked on Left Cape (57°15′30″N 152°57′00″W) at the entrance to Kiliuda Bay (57.3158°N 152.9872°W) on the coast of Alaska's Kodiak Island after her helmsman fell asleep at her wheel. Her bottom eventually was damaged beyond repair. Her wreck was visible on Left Cape for decades afterward.
Khersones	Soviet Union	The 708 GRT coastal tanker was sunk as a target in the Black Sea.
Star No. 74	United States	The 39-gross register ton, 61.4-foot (18.7 m) barge was destroyed by a storm at Old Sitka in Southeast Alaska.
