= Battle of East Chongwu =

1965 naval battle

- Part of Project National Glory
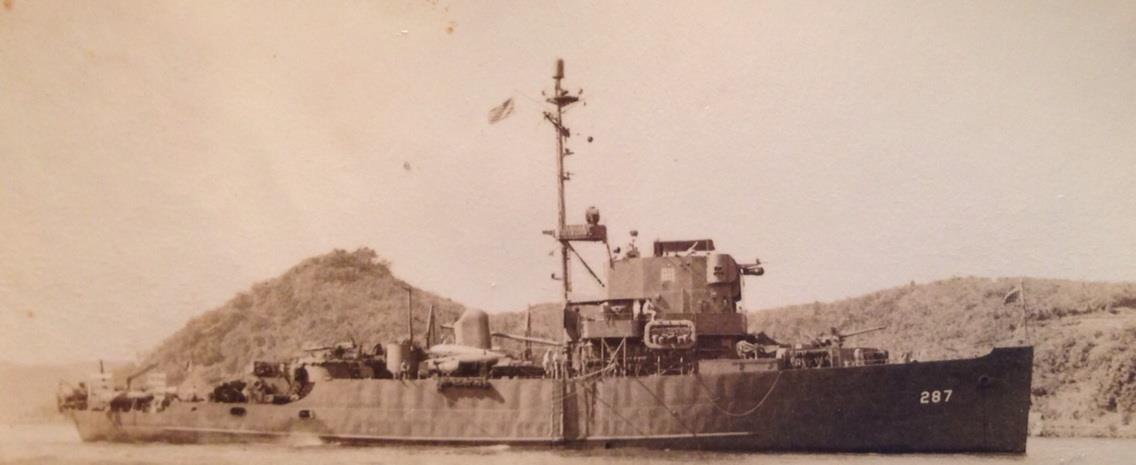
- ROCS Lin Huai (formerly USS Refresh)
Date	3–4 November 1965 (1 day)
Location	Taiwan Strait 24.82°N 119.46°E
Result	People's Republic of China victory

Belligerents
Republic of China (Taiwan)	People's Republic of China

Commanders and leaders
Mai Bingkun; Zhu Puhua; Chen Dekui	Zhou Renjie; Wei Hengwu; Ma Gan; Zhang Yimin

Units involved
Republic of China Navy	People's Liberation Army Navy

Strength
1 Admirable-class minesweeper: Lin Huai; 1 PCE-842-class patrol craft: Shan Hai	Attack Team: 6 patrol boats; 6 PT boats; Support Team: 4 patrol boats as direct support; 3 patrol boats to Dongyin

Casualties and losses
Lin Huai sunk; Shan Hai damaged; 78 killed or missing	Official claim: 2 patrol boats damaged; 2 PT boats damaged; 2 killed; 17 wounded; ROC claim: 4 ships sunk; 1 ship severely damaged

The Battle of East Chongwu (Chinese: 崇武以东海战), also known in Taiwan as the Battle of Wuqiu (Chinese: 烏坵海戰), was a naval battle fought between the Republic of China and the People's Republic of China from 13 to 14 November 1965.

== Background ==
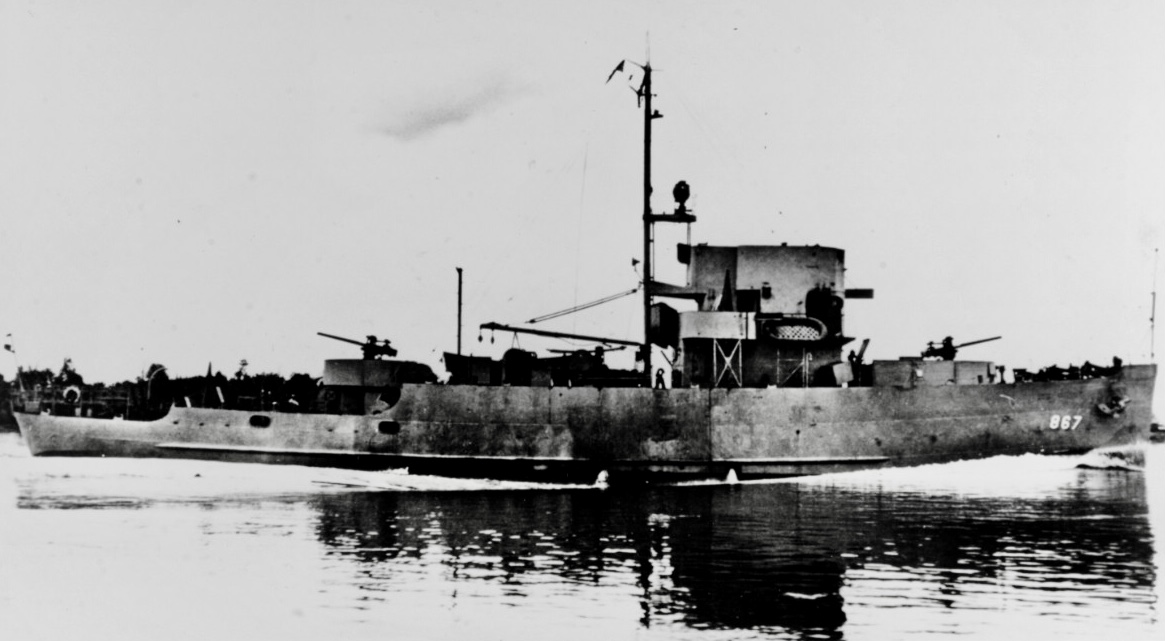
ROCS Shan Hai (formerly USS PCE-867)

After experiencing the loss of two ships on 6 August 1965 at the Battle of Dongshan, the ROC Navy (ROCN) decided to step up its activities and tried to draw the PLA Navy (PLAN) into another battle.

On 13 November at 1:15 p.m, two ships were dispatched to Wuqiu. They were Lin Huai (originally named Yung Chang) captained by Chen Dekui and Shan Hai (originally named Yong Tai) captained by Zhu Puhua with the force being overall led by Mai Bingkun. According to ROC accounts, the ships were sent to Wuqiu to evacuate injured soldiers from accidents caused by engineering blasting on it.

== Operation ==
=== Planning ===
On 13 November at 1:20 p.m, the PLA high command received information that two ROC ships, Lin Huai and Shan Hai had departed Magong Island for the Chongwu coast with the information being confirmed by radar stations. Zhou Enlai and Marshal He Long decided to attack the ROC ships. Zhou reiterated the key principles were concentrating force and firepower on one ship first; attacking at close range at night; avoiding mistakenly firing on our own; and disengaging before dawn. Zhou's instructions were passed on to the PLAN HQ and Fuzhou Military Region Command. The PLAN issued the order to Zhou Renjie, East Sea Fleet deputy commander, who was charged with the operation that afternoon.

The plan was to intercept the ROC ships at eight nautical miles south of Wuqiu Island around 11 pm. The same tactics from the Battle of Dongshan would be used. Zhou dispatched an Attack Team with six patrol boats and six PT boats under the command of Wei Hengwu. Meanwhile, the navy's Fujian Command deployed four patrol boats to fifteen nautical miles (28 km; 17 mi) east of Chongwu and three patrol boats to the waters around Dongyin. The plan was approved by PLA high command.

Wei held a captain meeting organizing three attack formations and giving assignments to each captain. He ordered three patrol boats to form the first attack group which under his command would fire on Lin Huai to slow it down. The second group consisting of the other three patrol boats under the command of Ma Gan, would attack Shan Hai. After the ROC ships were stopped or slowed down, the third attack group, consisting of six PT boats commanded by Zhang Yimin, would launch their attack to sink the ROC ships.

=== Battle ===
At 10:16 p.m, Wei's team embarked to locate their targets. Around 11:14 p.m, his radar discovered the two enemy ships about 10.5 nautical miles (19.4 km; 12.1 mi) away, with a speed of 12 knots (22 km/h; 14 mph). Wei ordered his gunboats to speed up toward the enemy ships, which did not know the approaching PLAN boats. About thirteen minutes later, Wei's formation met the ROC ships. He ordered his patrol boats to run through between the two ships and separate them. At around 11 p.m his team opened fire on the two ships.

Then Wei ordered Zhang to launch the torpedo attack on Lin Huai, however, the attacks missed. Meanwhile, Shan Hai opened fire on Wei's team from behind with its bigger guns and hit Wei's flagship killing three officers and badly wounding Wei. The after his first torpedo attack failed to hit Lin Huai, Zhang split the second PT boats into two formations for frontal and flanking attacks. On 14 November 1965 at around 12:30 am, a PT boat reached within four cable lengths of Lin Huai and fired two torpedoes within 300 meters (330 yd). One of them hit Lin Huai and it began to sink. Around this time, the ROC Air Force who had been previously notified shortly before midnight was providing air support with four North American F-86 Sabre and four Lockheed F-104 Starfighter aircraft. In addition, PLAN forces detected two U.S. destroyers approaching Wuqiu so they needed fight quickly. At 1:06 am, Lin Huai sank about fifteen nautical miles south of Wuqiu.

At 1:20 a.m, the now-damaged Shan Hai was notified by a reconnaissance team in Wuqiu that Lin Huai had been sunk and that it should retreat to Wuqiu covered by shore artillery before it got trapped. At 1:40 a.m, it reached the Wuqiu anchorage where it managed to repel all further attacks until 4:28 a.m when dawn arrived and the PLAN forces retreated. The ROC Air Force searched the Wuqiu area for PLAN forces but were not able to find anything.

The ROC estimated it sank four PLAN ships and damaged one while the PRC claimed its casualties were two patrol and two PT boats damaged, 2 killed and 17 wounded. Regarding Lin Huai, 78 people were killed or reported missing with only Chen and 15 others surviving. Soon after the battle, two U.S. destroyers from the United States Seventh Fleet, USS O'Brien and USS Leonard F. Mason, arrived and rescued Chen and the other survivors from the water. Mai and Chen who were responsible for carrying out the mission returned to Zuoying District where Chiang Ching-kuo ordered that they be detained and handed over to the Military Justice Bureau of the Ministry of National Defense to stand trial.

== Aftermath ==
On 26 November 1965, Zhou Enlai and Luo Ruiqing met the representatives from the task squadron in Shanghai and congratulated their victory.

PLAN historians argue that the battles of Dong-Yin, Dongshan and East Chongwu that resulted in a loss of three ROC warships dealt a significant blow to the ROCN. The military balance across the Taiwan Strait was altered and the dominance of the ROCN over it was a thing of the past. Taiwanese strategist Zhong Jian agrees with the assessment and stated Project National Glory and Chiang Kai-shek's dream of retaking back mainland China was now diminished with a loss of confidence in the military. By 1966, the number of "special military talks" personally hosted by Chiang Kai-shek had significantly decreased with Chiang himself getting ill with age. His son, Chiang Ching-kuo expressed that the ROC will no longer attack as it cannot suffer any more setbacks. Instead he wanted to focus on the ROC's economy, obtain US military aid and build a strong defensive force that will deter the PRC from attacking.

== Sources ==
- Li, Xiaobing (15 October 2023). China's New Navy: The Evolution of PLAN from the People's Revolution to a 21st Century Cold War. Naval Institute Press. ISBN 978-1-68247-809-7.
- Ryan, Mark A.; Finkelstein, David M.; McDevitt, Michael A.; Corporation, C. N. A. (29 April 2016). Chinese Warfighting: The PLA Experience since 1949: The PLA Experience since 1949. Routledge. ISBN 978-1-134-94250-3.
- 孫建中 (1 June 2020). 軍事史評論第27期 (in Chinese). 國防部政務辦公室(秀威經銷).
