= Project National Glory =

Republic of China plan to reconquer mainland China

- Part of and the Chinese Civil War the cross-strait conflict
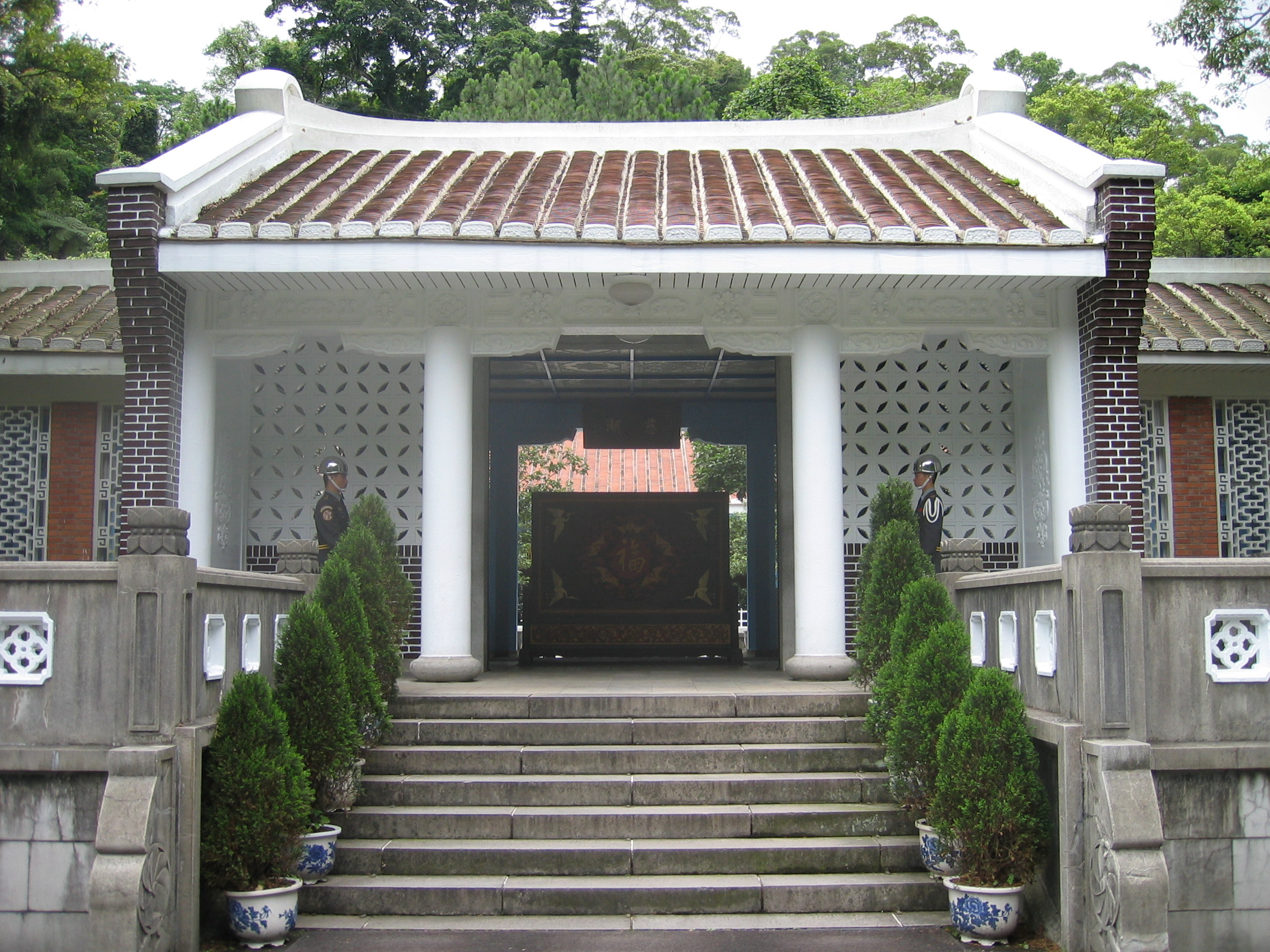
- The Cihu Mausoleum displays the project's documentation
Date	1 April 1961 – 20 July 1972 (11 years, 3 months, 2 weeks and 5 days)
Location	Taiwan Strait
Result	Inconclusive

Belligerents
Republic of China (Taiwan)	People's Republic of China

Commanders and leaders
Chiang Kai-shek	Mao Zedong

Units involved
Republic of China Armed Forces	People's Liberation Army

Casualties and losses
>300	Unknown

Project National Glory
- Traditional Chinese: 國光計劃
- Simplified Chinese: 国光计划
Transcriptions
Standard Mandarin
- Hanyu Pinyin: Guóguāng Jìhuà
- Bopomofo: ㄍㄨㄛˊ ㄍㄨㄤ ㄐㄧˋ ㄏㄨㄚˋ
- Wade–Giles: Kuo^{2}-kuang^{1} Chi^{4}-hua^{4}
- IPA: [kwô kwáŋ tɕî xwâ]
Wu
- Wugniu: koq^{7} kuaon^{1} ci^{5} waq^{8}
- IPA: Shanghainese: [koʔ˧ kuɑ̃˦ tɕi˧ ɦuaʔ˨]
Hakka
- Pha̍k-fa-sṳ: Kwet-kwong Kè-va̍k
Yue: Cantonese
- Yale Romanization: gwok gwōng gai waahk
- Jyutping: gwok^{3} gwong^{1} gai^{3} waak^{6}
- IPA: [kʷɔk̚˧ kʷɔŋ˥ kɐj˧ wak̚˨]
Southern Min
- Hokkien POJ: Kok-kong Kè-e̍k

Project National Glory (Chinese: 國光計劃; pinyin: Guóguāng jìhuà; Wade–Giles: Kuo^{2}-kuang^{1} chi^{4}-hua^{4}) or Project Guoguang was a planned attempt by the Republic of China (ROC) to reconquer mainland China from the People's Republic of China (PRC) by large scale amphibious invasion after the Chinese Civil War. Guoguang was the most elaborate of the ROC plans or studies to invade the mainland after 1949. It was initiated in 1961 in response to events involving the PRC, particularly the Great Leap Forward and the Sino-Soviet split. Guoguang was never executed; it required more troops and material than the ROC could muster, and it lacked support from the United States, especially after the PRC developed nuclear weapons and the disastrous naval skirmishes at Dongshan and East Chongwu. The use of a large scale invasion as the initial stage of reunification was effectively abandoned after 1966, although the Guoguang planning organization was not abolished until 1972. The ROC abandoned the policy of using force for reunification in 1990.

== Background ==
In 1949, the ROC retreated from the mainland to Taiwan. The ROC took steps to stabilize its position and prepare for the future war. The armed forces (ROCAF) undertook reforms. The conscription system was modified to produce a reserve. Former Japanese soldiers, the White Group, contributed to planning and personnel training. The provision of military aid from the US was formalized with the Sino-American Mutual Defense Treaty. By the end of the 1950s, the ROCAF was an effective defensive force. General indoctrination and anti-PRC propaganda was widespread. The sinicization of the native Taiwanese population drew special attention to support conscription and mobilization. In March 1956, plans envisioned the mobilization of 730,000 men from the ages of 21 to 35.

The ROC also planned and sought opportunities to attack the PRC. From 1951 to 1954, the ROC's irregular Anti-Communist Salvation Army — trained by the US Central Intelligence Agency — raided the PRC coast from ROC-controlled islands near the mainland. The ROC's offer to attack the PRC during the Korean War — while the PRC's attention was diverted — was declined by the US. Other options that were considered were a regional campaign on the PRC-Myanmar border, and guerrilla involvement in the Vietnam War as a supporting diversion for a ROC invasion across the Taiwan Strait.

By 1961, the ROC assessed that conditions were becoming favorable. Project Guoguang later identified that the ideal time to attack was when the PRC was embroiled in political strife, or at war with rebels or neighbouring countries. The PRC was suffering internal unrest from the Great Leap Forward and the ongoing Sino-Soviet split was also considered to be advantageous.

== Invasion planning and postponement ==
Project Guoguang was established on 1 April 1961. The ROCAF created a staff, the Guoguang Operation Office, that was the primary supervisory body for invasion planning and preparations; it was led by a lieutenant general and reported directly to Chiang Kai-shek. The government also prepared in the first half of 1962; it created organizations for wartime mobilization and administration, the Special Defence Budget, and a new tax — the Special Defence Levy — that would be collected until June 1963. These government developments were noticed by foreign observers. ROC agents and paramilitary forces along the coast shifted from gathering intelligence to probing attacks in 1962 and 1963. In April 1964, Chiang Kai-shek ordered the construction of a headquarters, including air raid shelters, behind his residence at Cihu.

The war plan was divided into multiple phases, with Phase I being the initial surprise amphibious assault of Xiamen in Fujian province. The ROC island of Jinmen would be the forward operating base. PRC reinforcements were expected to arrive five days before the landing, so any landing would meet an immediate counterattack. It was estimated the landing would require 270,000 troops — about a third of mobilized strength — and suffer 50,000 casualties. After the landing, the ROC would advance by covertly fomenting, or taking advantage of unrest in the PRC. However, this was too vague for planning purposes, and so detailed planning did not proceed beyond Phase I. Planners recognized that even Phase I was a difficult proposition; it stretched available manpower and exceeded available sea and airlift for troops and logistics.

The ROC also sought US support as a necessary precondition for war, and which could make up for the transport and logistics shortfalls. However, the US opposed the resumption of warfare in China; it communicated this through diplomatic channels, and by overtly surveilling the ROC's preparations through the Military Assistance Advisory Group. This prompted the ROC to put the invasion on hold.

== Second attempt ==
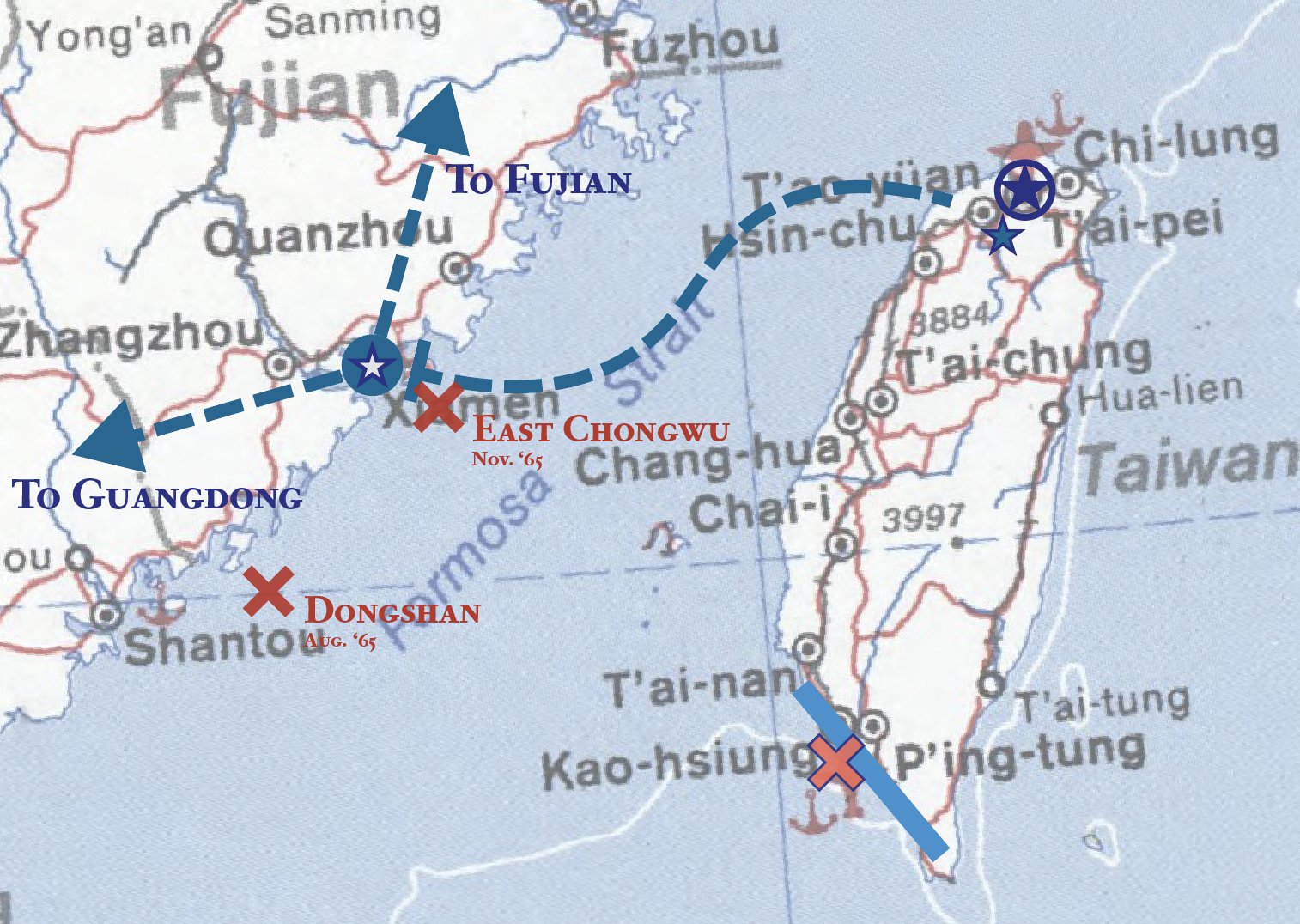
The plans of Project Guoguang.

Chiang Kai-shek decided to proceed without US approval following the PRC's first successful nuclear weapon test in October 1964; on 17 June 1965, he notified officers at a meeting at the ROC Military Academy that the invasion was imminent. A final decision was to be made on 20 July. Mobilized officers, and personnel deployed to Kinmen, were required to have a will and testament as part of preparations. Ultimately, no invasion was launched but the year was marred by accidents and defeats.

On 24 June, an amphibious landing exercise in southern Taiwan caused the deaths of over ten soldiers when strong waves overturned five amphibious assault vehicles.

On 6 August at the Battle of Dongshan, two ROC Navy (ROCN) warships carrying troops to conduct a reconnaissance of the mainland were intercepted and sunk by People's Liberation Army Navy torpedo boats near Dongshan Island, Fujian; 200 ROC personnel were killed. The warships lacked air support; the ROC Air Force had been unaware of the mission due to a communication error.

In November at the Battle of East Chongwu, the ROCN warships Shan Hai and Lin Huai were intercepted by the PLAN while en route the islands of Magong and Wuqiu to pick up wounded troops. Lin Huai was sunk by two torpedoes, and 90 ROC personnel were killed.

== Further proposals to the US ==
In September 1965, the ROC offered to aid the US in the Vietnam War by invading Guangdong province. The offer was rejected as the US was then attempting to limit the war and did not want to expand the conflict (at this time intervention in Cambodia and Laos was not US policy).

The start of the PRC's Cultural Revolution in 1966 prompted the ROC to review its plans in anticipation of exploiting unrest on the mainland. In 1967, Chiang Kai-shek was confident that the instability overtaking the PRC — including in the government and military — would not be short-lived. The ROC again — and for the last time — sought US aid for an invasion; the request was rejected.

The Guoguang Operation Office was renamed as the Operation Planning Office in 1966.

== Reassessing strategy ==
The acceptance of US non-involvement and the replacement of US military aid by Foreign Military Sales forced the ROC to reassess its strategy. Economic development — upon which military preparedness would depend — now had to be considered. Chiang Ching-kuo believed that success required a popular and armed anti-Communist revolution ("Hungary-style") in the PRC — which an ROC invasion could then support — and significant changes to the international environment. The new strategy was to build an economy to support offensive operations while encouraging revolution in the PRC with psychological warfare and propaganda. Initially, the ROCAF studied the "Wang-shih" plan which used special forces to infiltrate the PRC and incite rebellion. In response to the new strategy, the ROCAF adopted the defensive "Ku-an" plan while offensive preparations continued.

Chiang Ching-kuo's control over policy began to increase in 1969. He was appointed as Vice Premier in July 1969, and then Premier on 1 June 1972. Crucially, Chiang Kai-shek suffered a road accident in September 1969 after which he gradually receded from politics as his health declined. Between 1969 and 1972, the international position of the ROC changed radically due to the normalization of relations between the US and the PRC. The Nixon Doctrine and announcement of the withdrawal of US troops from Taiwan in the Shanghai Communiqué demanded that the ROC pay more attention to defense. Chiang Ching-kuo appreciated this, although he continued to support — at least in principle — an eventual offensive.

For a time, the ROC may have abandoned the expectation of mounting a large scale attack on the PRC; the Operation Planning Office was abolished on 20 July 1972. Attention shifted to the "Wang-shih" plan, which was revised in 1976 on the unrealized possibility of exploiting the death of Mao Zedong. However, in 1987 the nominally defensive "Ku-an" plan gained an — ultimately incomplete — section pertaining to attacking the mainland based on the strategic concept that "the principal battlefield is the mainland, and the secondary battlefield is Taiwan." The ROCAF remained organized as an offensive force, and paratroops were trained to support an offensive.

== Aftermath ==
Lee Teng-hui served as acting president after Chiang Ching-kuo's death in 1988, then formally assumed that office in 1990. He immediately abandoned the policy of pursuing the reunification of China through force, which allowed the ROCAF to adopt a fully defensive posture starting in 1991.

In April 2009 it was announced that secret documentation for Project Guoguang would be declassified and displayed at the Cihu Mausoleum starting in May 2009.

== See also ==
- Outline of the Chinese Civil War
- Outline of the military history of the People's Republic of China
- Go and Reclaim the Mainland
- Black Bat Squadron
- Black Cat Squadron
- Ray S. Cline
