= MV Pozarica =

A number of motor vessels were named Pozarica, including

- MV Pozarica (1937), built by William Doxford & Sons, became HMS Pozarica during World War II. Lost due to enemy action on 13 February 1943 at Bougie, Algeria
- MV Pozarica (1945), built by NV Scheepswerke Gebroeders Pot. In service 1953–64
