= USS PCE-867 =

PCE-842-class of the US Navy

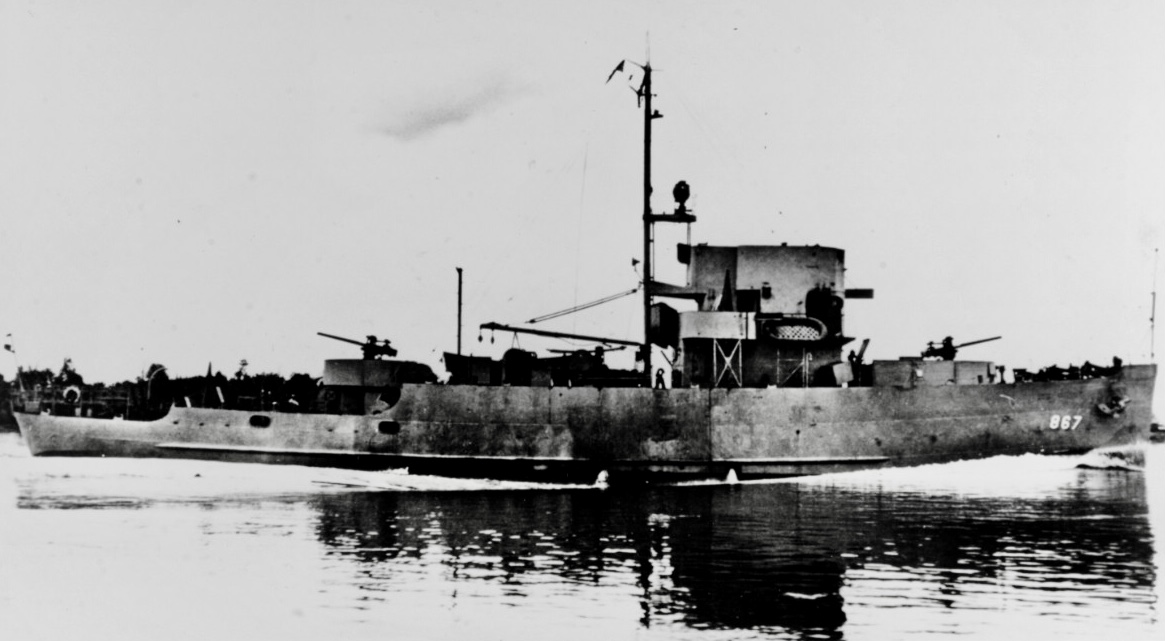
- USS PCE-867

History

United States
- Name: PCE-867
- Builder: Albina Engine & Machine Works, Portland
- Laid down: 8 July 1942
- Launched: 3 December 1942
- Commissioned: 20 June 1943
- Identification: Callsign: NXLP
- Fate: Transferred to Republic of China, 12 September 1945

History

Taiwan
- Name: Yong Tai; (永泰)
- Namesake: Yongtai County
- Acquired: 12 September 1945
- Renamed: Shan Hai; (山海)
- Namesake: Shan Hai
- Reclassified: PCE-41; PCE-62, 1954
- Identification: Pennant number: PCE-35
- Fate: Scrapped

General characteristics
- Class & type: PCE-842-class patrol craft
- Displacement: 914 Tons (Full Load)
- Length: 184.5 ft (56.2 m)
- Beam: 33 ft (10 m)
- Draft: 9.75 ft (2.97 m)
- Installed power: 2,200 hp (1,600 kW)
- Propulsion: Main: 2 × GM 12-567A diesel engines; Auxiliary: 2 × GM 6-71 diesel engines with 100KW gen and 1 × GM 3-268A diesel engine with 60KW gen
- Speed: 16 knots (30 km/h; 18 mph) (maximum),
- Range: 6,600 nmi (12,200 km; 7,600 mi) at 11 knots (20 km/h; 13 mph)
- Complement: 79
- Armament: 1 × Mk.26 3"/50 caliber gun dual purpose gun; 3 × single Bofors 40 mm gun; 4 × Mk.10 Oerlikon 20 mm guns; 4 × M2 .50 cal (12.7 mm) machine guns

USS PCE-867 was a PCE-842-class patrol craft for the United States Navy during World War II. She was renamed ROCS Yong Tai (PCE-41) and ROCS Shan Hai (PCE-62) after being acquired by the Republic of China Navy on 7 February 1948.

== Construction and career ==
PCE-867 was laid down by Albina Engineer & Machine Works, Portland on 8 July 1942 and launched on 3 December 1942. She was commissioned on 20 June 1943.

After the war on 12 September 1945, she was transferred to the Republic of China Navy as ROCS Yong Tai (PCE-41) under the Lend-Lease program. Yong Tai was commissioned on an unknown date under the command of Lieutenant Colonel Wang Enhua. On 8 June 1947, Yong Tai was transiting from Huludao to Qingdao when a newly assigned second lieutenant Ji Rui armed with a gun fired 7 shots on board the ship, injuring the captain, Lieutenant Colonel Li Yuxi and two other officers. Naval officer Zheng Jiamo was killed during the incident. On the 17th, the ship then arrived in Qingdao and the Qingdao naval authorities were notified of the incident.

On 1 January 1954, the naval fleet was reorganized thus, Yong Tai was renamed to Shan Hai (PCE-62).

Between 13 and 14 November 1965, the ship alongside ROCS Linhuai (AM-51) were underway southeast of Wuqiu when they came under attack during the Battle of East Chongwu. Shan Hai would then be scrapped on an unknown date.
