= Battle of Dong-Yin =

1965 naval battle in the Taiwan Strait

- Part of Project National Glory
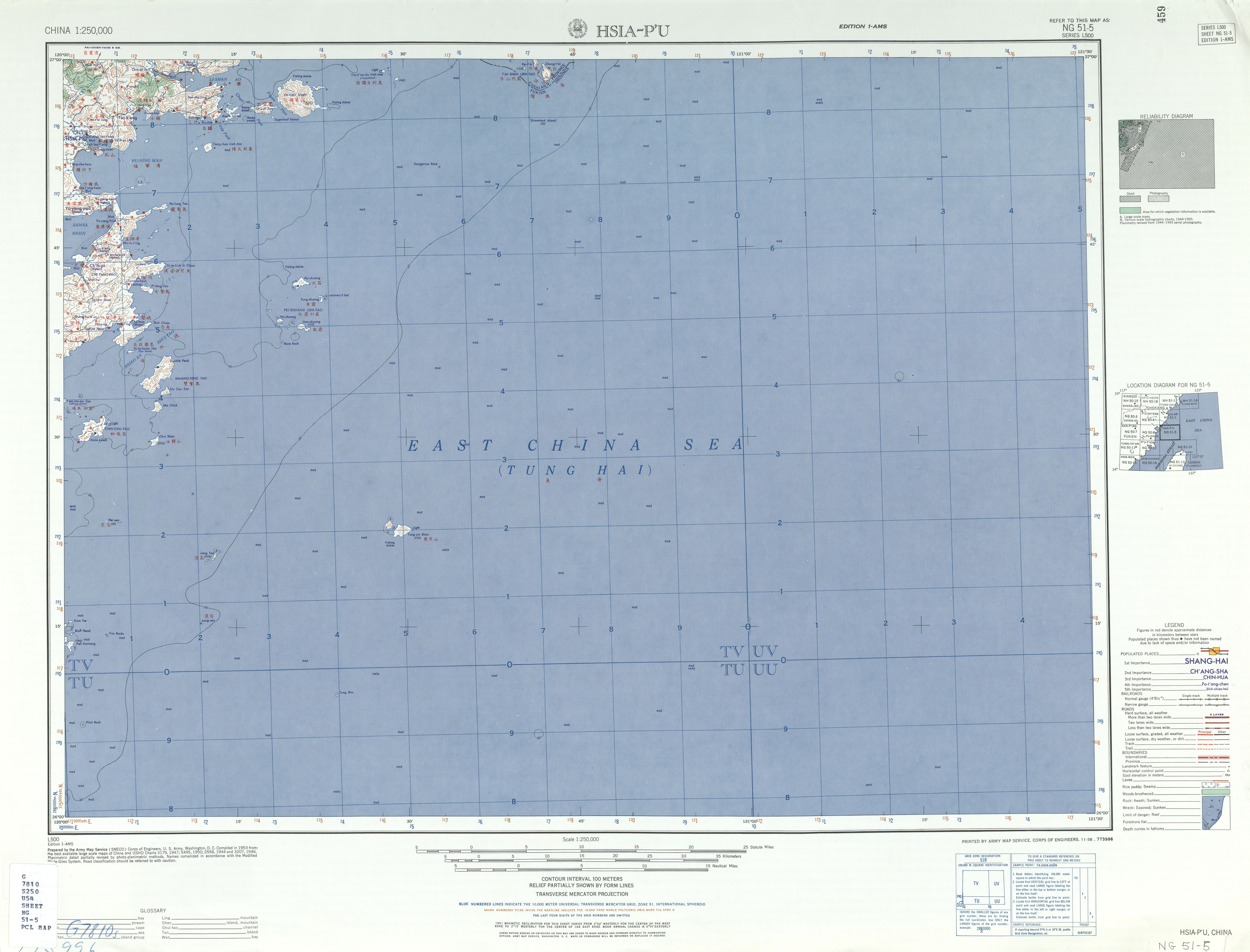
- Map of Dong-Yin (labelled as Tung-yin Shan 東引山) (1953)
Date	1 May 1965
Location	Taiwan Strait 26.378°N 120.507°E
Result	Inconclusive

Belligerents
Republic of China (Taiwan)	People's Republic of China

Commanders and leaders
Ho Ten Song	?

Units involved
Republic of China Navy	People's Liberation Army Navy

Strength
1 destroyer	8 gunboats

Casualties and losses
Official claim: 3 killed; 4 wounded; Estimate: 7 killed; 43 wounded	4 gunboats sunk; 2 gunboats damaged

The Battle of Dong-Yin (Chinese: 東引海戰) also known as the Battle of May First (Chinese: 五一海戰) was a naval conflict between forces of the Republic of China Navy and the People's Liberation Army Navy around Dongyin island, Fukien Province, Republic of China on 1 May 1965. Both sides subsequently claimed victory.

== Overview ==
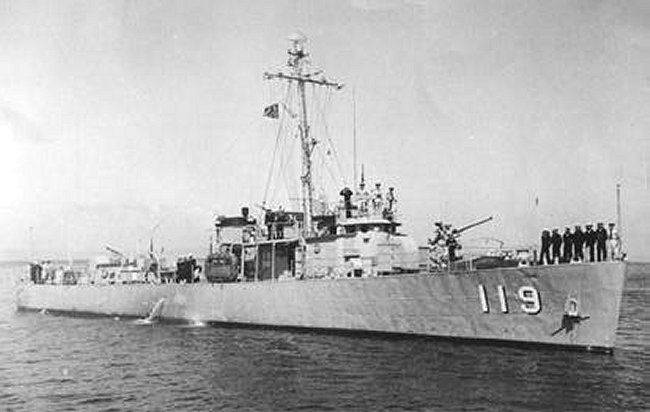
ROCS PC-119 Tung Kiang.

Around 12:40 AM on May 1, 1965, a ROCN Northern Division Dong-jiang a PC-461-class submarine chaser on patrol northeast of Dong-Yin Island encountered a PLAN force consisting of 4 fast attack Type 062 gunboat. The PLAN combatants attempted to encircle the ROCN destroyer, and the two sides exchanged fire from a distance of 500 to 1,000 yards.

In the ensuing exchange, the Dong-jiang received a total of 154 hits. Seven crew members died, 19 received serious injuries, and 24 received minor injuries. The ship's casualty rate reached 62%. The ship remained in service until 1970.

2 PLAN gunboats were damaged, one was slightly damaged by Taiwanese retaliatory fire, and a second which collided with a gunboat had to be towed.

== See also ==
- Outline of the Chinese Civil War
- Outline of the military history of the People's Republic of China
