= USCGC Sorrel =

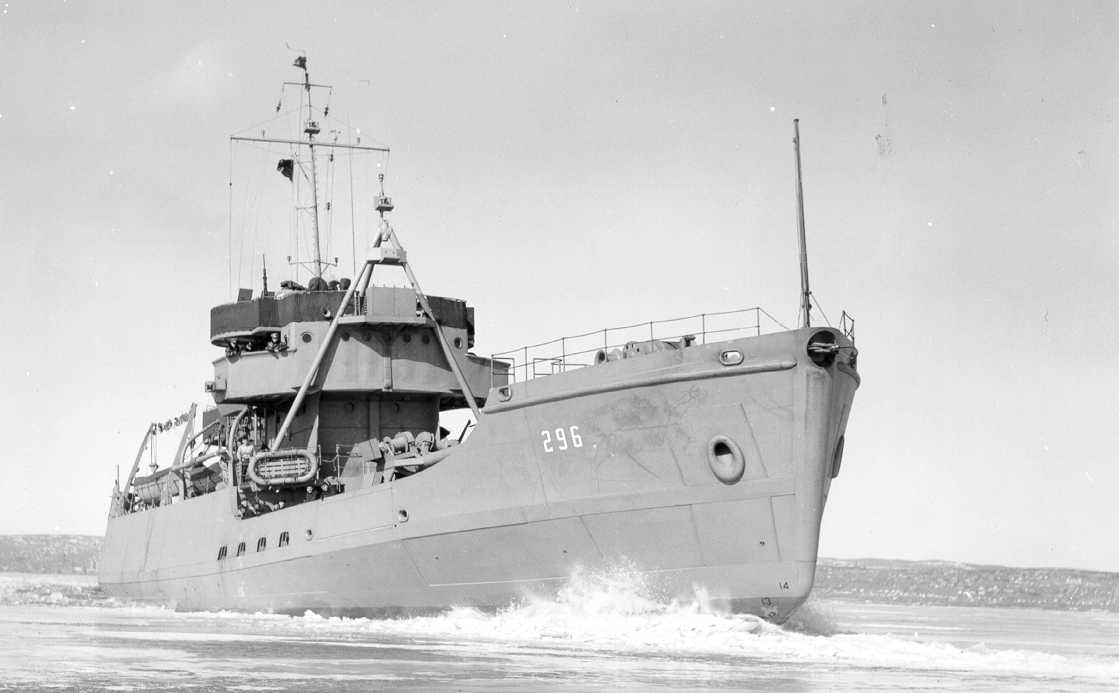
- USCGC Sorrel.

History

United States
- Namesake: Sorrel plant
- Builder: Zenith Dredge, Duluth, Minnesota
- Laid down: 26 May 1942
- Launched: 28 September 1942
- Commissioned: 15 April 1943
- Identification: USCG Doc. No.: 1097357; Callsign: WDC3952
- Fate: Scrapped in Mexico by Ocean Express Recycling

General characteristics
- Class & type: Cactus (A)
- Displacement: 935 long tons (950 t) full load (1945); 1,026 long tons (1,042 t) full load (1966); 700 long tons (710 t) light (1966);
- Length: 180 ft (55 m)
- Beam: 37 ft (11 m)
- Draft: 12 ft (3.7 m) (1945); 14 ft 7 in (4.45 m) (1966)
- Speed: 13 kn (24 km/h; 15 mph) (1945); 11.9 kn (22.0 km/h; 13.7 mph) (1966)
- Complement: 6 Officers, 74 men (1945); 4 officers, 2 warrants, 47 men (1966)
- Armament: 1 × 3 in (76 mm)/50 (single); 2 × 20mm Oerlikon/80 (single); 2 × depth charge tracks; 2 × Mousetraps; 4 × Y-guns (1945); None (1966)

USCGC Sorrel (WAGL/WLB-296) was a Cactus (A) class buoy tender of the United States Coast Guard built by Zenith Dredge of Duluth, Minnesota. Her keel was laid 26 May 1942, launched 28 September 1942 and commissioned on 15 April 1943.

== History ==
After commissioning, Sorrel joined her sister ships Cactus and Cowslip in Boston, Massachusetts, until 25 July 1947. During her tenure in Boston, she was used for maintaining navigational aids and ice breaking. On 25 July 1947 she reported to Rockland, Maine, and then on 25 October 1948 she returned to Boston, where she would remain until 1 May 1954. All during this time of being shuffled between Boston and Rockland, she frequently worked out of Argentia, Newfoundland.

On 8 December 1948 Sorrel freed icebound USS Whitewood; on 23–24 October 1950 rescued eight crew from the motor vessel North Voyager; on 29 November 1951 assisted following collision between motor vessel Ventura and fishing vessel Lynn near Boston; on 20–21 July 1952 towed disabled fishing vessel Richard J. Nunan to Portland, Maine, for repairs; and on 19 February 1953 towed disabled fishing vessels Geraldine and Phyllis to Boston, Massachusetts, for repair.

On 1 May 1954 Sorrel was reassigned to Sitka, Alaska, for maintaining navigational aids, search and rescue missions, ice breaking, law and treaty enforcement and enforcement of U.S. territorial waters. On 12–13 September 1956 she assisted fishing vessel Valencia near Sitka, Alaska; on 18 June 1958 assisted fishing vessel Guardian 120 miles west of Sitka; and on 10–11 July 1958 assisted residents at Lituya Bay and Yakutat Bay following an earthquake in the region. On 22 October 1962 Sorrel assisted in the successful rescue of 95 passengers of a Northwest Airlines DC-7C that crashed near Sitka, Alaska.

On 1 July 1965 Sorrel was reassigned to Seward, Alaska, where she would remain until 18 April 1973. On 13 September 1966 she assisted towing fishing vessel Jo Ann to Cordova, Alaska; on 6 November 1967 fought a fire at Shelter Cove, Alaska; on 4 November 1969 medevaced two crewmen seriously burned in a fire on the Japanese fishing vessel Koshin Maru'; and on 21 November 1970 medevaced crewman from fishing vessel Lee Ann to Seward, Alaska, for medical aid.

From 18 April 1973 to 31 March 1976 Sorrel was stationed in Cordova, Alaska. On 31 March 1976 Sorrel left Alaska and reported to the Coast Guard Yard at Curtis Bay, Maryland, for major renovation under the Service Life Extension Program (SLEP). Under SLEP, she would get new generator and propulsion systems, navigational electronics, new vang supported boom system (eliminating the distinctive Cactus (A) Class "A" frame boom support), reworked superstructure and renovations to crew's living spaces.

Following SLEP, on 2 December 1982 Sorrel reported to Governor's Island, New York, to continue her career as a buoy tender until decommissioned on 20 June 1996. Sorrel was sold and is now the SS Reliance operated by Sea Scout Ship #13 of Stockton, California. She was used for training cruises to teach seamanship to young men and women.

In 2007, the Reliance was sold to Seaway Trading Inc. and renamed Fearless. Efforts to convert her into a humanitarian aid ship failed and she sat at anchor off Terminal Island in Long Beach, California, for 14 years, changing ownership at least once. At some point between 2021 and 2023, she was sold again – this time for scrapping. As of spring 2023 she was listed as bound for Mexico to be dismantled.
