= USS Toucan =

Minesweeper of the United States Navy

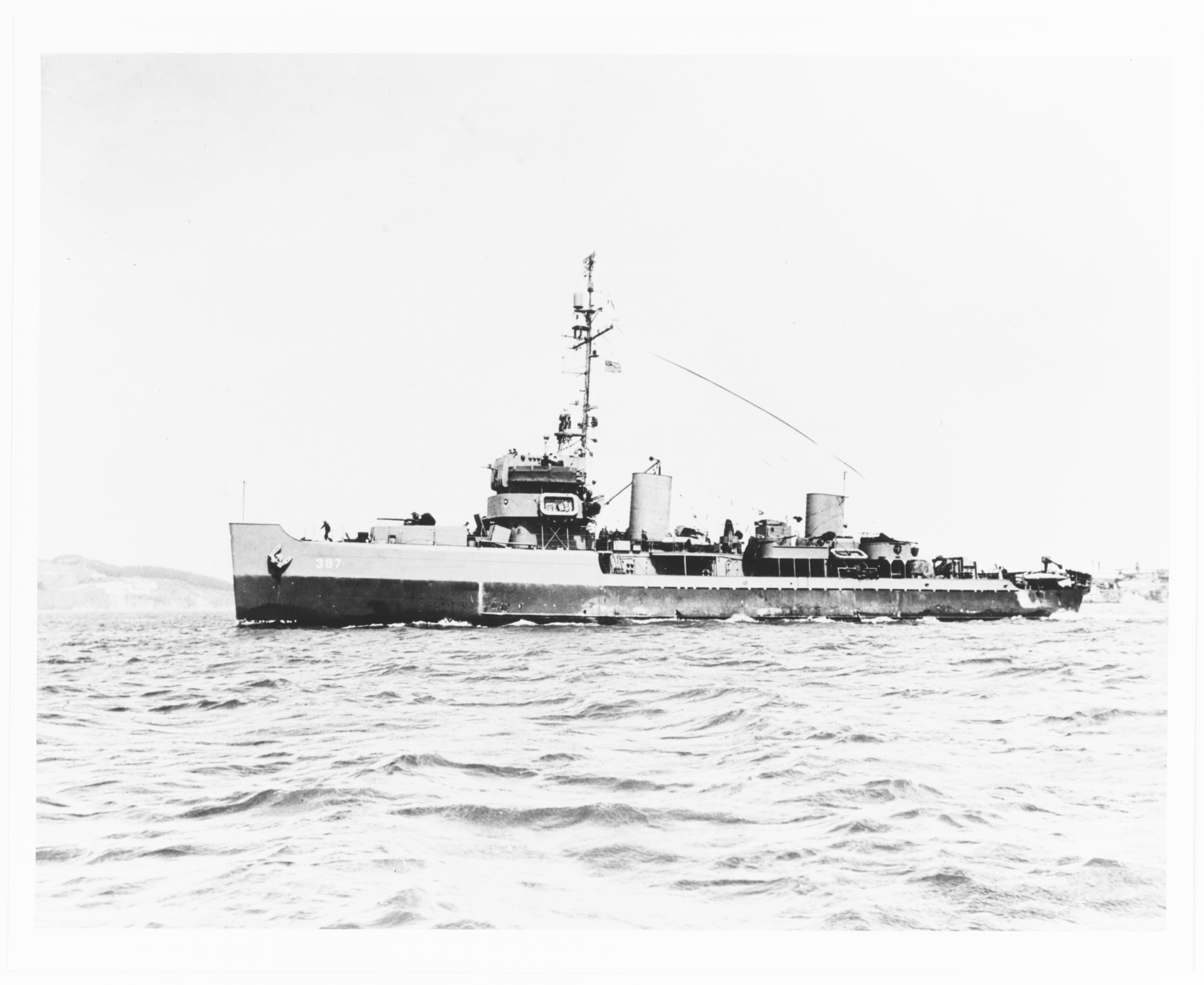

History

United States
- Name: USS Toucan (AM-387)
- Namesake: toucan
- Builder: American Ship Building Company, Cleveland, Ohio
- Laid down: 16 February 1944
- Launched: 15 September 1944
- Commissioned: 25 November 1944
- Decommissioned: 1 July 1946
- Recommissioned: 27 October 1950
- Reclassified: MSF-387, 7 February 1955
- Decommissioned: 1 May 1957
- Honors and awards: 3 battle stars (World War II); 2 battle stars (Korea)
- Fate: Transferred to Republic of China, 22 December 1964

History

Republic of China
- Name: ROCS Chien Men (PCE-45) 劍門
- Acquired: 22 December 1964
- Fate: Sunk at the Battle of Dongshan on 6 August 1965

General characteristics
- Class & type: Auk-class minesweeper
- Displacement: 890 long tons (904 t)
- Length: 221 ft 3 in (67.44 m)
- Beam: 32 ft (9.8 m)
- Draft: 10 ft 9 in (3.28 m)
- Speed: 18 knots (33 km/h; 21 mph)
- Complement: 100 officers and enlisted
- Armament: 1 × 3"/50 caliber gun; 2 × 40 mm guns; 2 × 20 mm guns; 2 × Depth charge tracks

USS Toucan (AM-387) was an Auk-class minesweeper acquired by the United States Navy for the dangerous task of removing mines from minefields laid in the water to prevent ships from passing. She was the only U.S. Navy ship named for the toucan, a brightly colored and easily tamed bird of the American tropics, characterized by its large but thin beak.

Toucan was laid down on 16 February 1944 at Cleveland, Ohio, by the American Ship Building Company; launched on 15 September 1944; sponsored by Miss Rose B. Jackiewicz; and commissioned on 25 November 1944.

== Service history ==
=== World War II ===
The minesweeper departed Cleveland on 28 November and proceeded via the Great Lakes and the St. Lawrence River to Boston where she arrived on 15 December. Toucan spent the next four months preparing for duty in the western Pacific.

Toucan departed Charleston, South Carolina, on 20 April, transited the Panama Canal, and arrived at San Diego, California, on 6 May. Three days later, the minesweeper sailed for Hawaii and arrived at Pearl Harbor on the 15th.Getting underway again on the 27th, the ship served in the screens of various convoys as she proceeded to the Ryukyus via Eniwetok, Guam, and Ulithi.

Reaching Okinawa as American forces pushed ever closer to Japan's home islands, Toucan swept the waters surrounding the Ryukyus and then performed escort duty and sweeping operations with the U.S. 3rd Fleet as it hammered away at Japanese ports, cities, and airfields through the end of July.

With the collapse of Japan, the task of clearing the offensive and defensive minefields in Pacific seas began in earnest. From 14 to 24 August, Toucan took part in the "Skagway" sweep in the East China Sea and Ryukyus area. A call at Shanghai, China, punctuated two further sweeping operations — from 7 September to 2 October and from 25 to 30 October. The latter was conducted in the Kyūshū-Korea area. All told, she steamed over 40,000 miles and swept 134 mines in the East China Sea, the lower Yangtze River, and in the Chusan Archipelago. On 6 February 1946, Toucan left Japanese waters and headed for the west coast, arriving at San Francisco, California, on 23 March 1946. Moving to San Diego on 24 April, she began preparations for inactivation and was placed out of commission, in reserve, there on 1 July 1946.

=== Korean War ===
The outbreak of hostilities in Korea in June 1950 increased the Navy's need for minecraft. Accordingly, Toucan was recommissioned on 27 October and operated on the west coast for more than a year. On 4 January 1952, Toucan sailed for Sasebo and called at Pearl Harbor and Midway Islands before reaching Sasebo on 2 February. She commenced Korean War operations in the Hungnam and Wonsan areas on 21 February, streaming her sweeping gear and hunting for the dangerous North Korean mines. With periodic repairs at Sasebo, Toucan operated primarily off Wonsan. From February through August 1952, the ship fired more than 8,000 rounds of ammunition at Communist shore targets — trading fire with the enemy on many occasions and dodging everything from 76 millimeter shells to small arms fire.

Her duties included the disruption of the North Korean fishing trade. The ship took 13 prisoners while destroying three sampans and damaging 22 more. The minesweeper also scored hits on enemy bunkers, box cars, and railroad trestles before departing Korean waters on 1 August to head for Long Beach, California.

The minesweeper returned to the Korean fighting zone the following year and continued her sweeping and interdiction operations in the vicinity of the Cho-Do, Paengyoung-Do, and Cheju-Do island areas from June to September 1953. The ship sailed for California and operated along the west coast from the time of her arrival at Long Beach on 3 December 1953 through 17 July 1954.

=== Post-war activity ===
Toucan returned to the Far East in the summer of 1954 and reached Incheon, Korea, on 14 August. Two days later, she got underway for the west coast of Korea and operated primarily in the Taeyongyong-Do and Tojang Po vicinity. She departed Sasebo on 11 January 1955 and proceeded to Hong Kong only to return to Japanese waters a fortnight later. Her stay at Sasebo was brief. Four days later, she weighed anchor for Keelung, Formosa, and thence moved to the Tachen Islands. On 7 February, the minesweeper took part in the evacuation of Chinese Nationalists from the Tachen group and disembarked the evacuees at Sasebo a week later. During this mission, on 7 February 1955, Toucan was redesignated MSF-387.

Departing Sasebo only two days after her arrival from the Tachens, Toucan headed home and arrived at Long Beach, California, on 11 March. She operated on the west coast as a unit of Mine Division 71 until August 1956 when she began another deployment to the Far East. She called at Yokosuka, Kobe, Sasebo, Fukuoka, Beppu, and Kagoshima, Japan, as well as Keelung, Formosa, before returning to Long Beach on 21 December.

=== Decommissioning and transfer to Taiwan ===
On 1 May 1957, Toucan was inactivated and assigned to the Pacific Reserve Fleet, berthing at the Columbia River, Oregon, Group. Upon disestablishment of this group, the minesweeper was transferred to Bremerton, Washington, where she remained until 27 May 1964. On that day, she was withdrawn from the reserve fleet for conversion and transfer to the Republic of China, effective on 22 December 1964.

The ship served in the Republic of China Navy as Chien Men (PCE-45), until sunk by boats from the Chinese People's Liberation Army Navy on 6 August 1965 at the Battle of Dongshan.

== Awards ==
Toucan received three battle stars for World War II and two battle stars for the Korean War.

== See also ==
- Commander Mine Squadron SEVEN
