= USS AFDM-2 =

Large auxiliary floating drydock of the US Navy

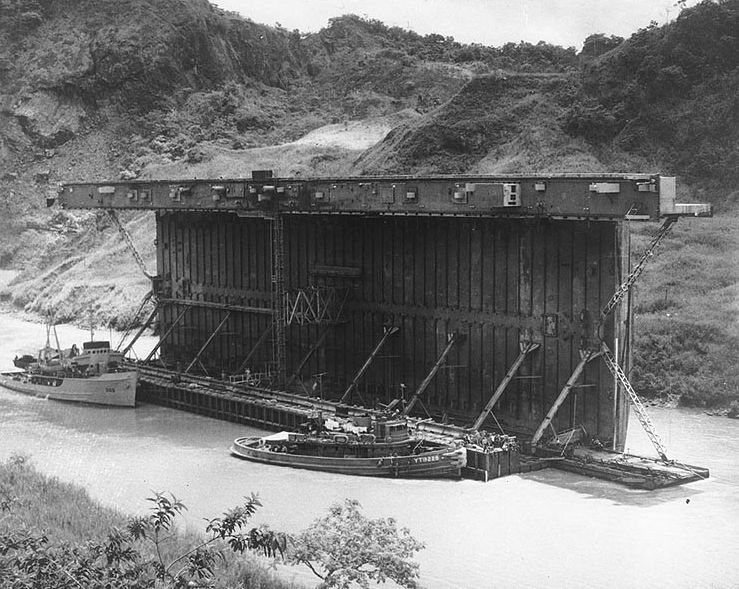
- AFDM-1-class floating drydock, on it side for Panama Canal passage

History

United States
- Name: YDS-4
- Operator: Todd Shipyards at New Orleans
- Builder: Alabama Drydock and Shipbuilding Company, Mobile
- Cost: $2,760,300 (1942)
- Laid down: January 1943
- Commissioned: 1 October 1943
- Reclassified: AFDM-2, 1945
- Honors and awards: See Awards
- Fate: Sold to Gulf Copper & Manufacturing Corp., 11 February 1999
- Status: Operational in Port Arthur, Texas

General characteristics
- Class & type: AFDM-1-class floating drydock
- Displacement: 6,360 t (6,260 long tons)
- Length: 616 ft (187.8 m)
- Beam: 116 ft (35.4 m)
- Draft: 6 ft (1.8 m), empty
- Capacity: 9,000 t (8,858 long tons), lift
- Complement: 4 officers, 146 enlisted
- Armament: 2 × Bofors 40 mm guns; 4 × Oerlikon 20 mm cannons
- Notes: 2 × service cranes

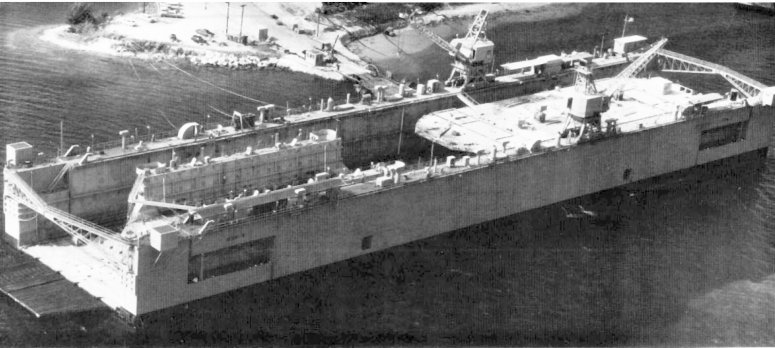
Sister ship USS Richland

USS AFDM-2, (former YFD-4), is an AFDM-3-class medium auxiliary floating drydock built in Mobile, Alabama, by the Alabama Drydock and Shipbuilding Company for the United States Navy. Originally named USS YFD-4, Yard Floating Dock-4, she operated by Todd Shipyards at New Orleans, Louisiana for the repair of US ships during World War II. YFD-4 was renamed an Auxiliary Floating Dock Medium AFDM-2 in 1945 after the war.

== Design ==
AFDM-2 was 37 feet (11.3 m) tall, 116 feet (35.4 m) wide, length of 614 feet (187.1 m) (all three section connected), and has a displacement of 6,360 tons. AFDM-2 could lift capacity 9,000 tons and had two service cranes to lift material and parts for removing damage parts and the installation of new parts. The floating drydock can repair ships up to a beam of 90 feet (27.4 m), as she is 90 feet wide between the wing walls. Ballast pontoons tanks are flooded with water to submerge or pumped dry to raise the ship. Submerged she can load a ship with a draft up to 20 feet (6.1 m).

== History ==
It was built by Alabama Drydock and Shipbuilding Company in Mobile, Alabama. she was laid down in January 1942 and commissioned on 1 October 1943, right after her delivery to the Navy.

Hurricane Betsy, Category 4, sank and damaged AFDM-2 on 9 September 1965. USS AFDM-2 was at Todd Shipyards on the west side of the Mississippi River in Algiers, New Orleans. AFDM-2 had the water pumped out of her pontoon tanks and was raised for repair. The salvage ships MS Cable and USS Curb and USS Salinan, an Achomawi-class fleet ocean tug, helped in the recovery of AFDM-2. Due to the large size of AFDM-2 two rescue and salvage ships, USS Salvager and USS Windlass arrived with three special support barges to help in the salvage. Land-based winches were also used in the recovery. On 25 August 1966 tugs returned AFDM-2 to Todd Shipyards, eleven months after her sinking. Repairs where completed and she was put back in service. Divers had to repair more than 100 holes in AFDM-2 to float her again.

On 16 May 1995 she was laid up in the National Defense Reserve Fleet, Beaumont, Texas. On 11 February 1999 she was reactivated and transferred to the Government of the Dominican Republic. She was later sold to Gulf Copper & Manufacturing Corporation at Port Arthur, Texas and renamed Mr. Morris. In 2013 USS LST-325, a landing ship, tank, now a museum ship, was repaired in AFDM-2. On 17 December 2021, USS Orleck (DD-886) arrived in Port Arthur to be repaired in AFDM-2.

== Awards ==
- American Campaign Medal
- Asiatic-Pacific Campaign Medal
- World War II Victory Medal

== See also ==
- Dry dock
- Hughes Mining Barge
- Semi-submersible naval vessel
- List of auxiliaries of the United States Navy
