= SS Yousuf Baksh =

History
- Name: SS Yousuf Baksh
- Port of registry: Pakistan
- Fate: Wrecked 1965

General characteristics
- Tonnage: 5,975 tons

SS Yousuf Baksh was a 5,975-ton Pakistan registered freighter which caught fire and ran aground in May 1965.

The Royal National Lifeboat Institution's Walmer Lifeboat Station attended the freighter, its cargo of jute being ablaze. The ship had become unsteerable and was drifting helplessly in The Downs - the stretch of water off the Kent coast between the Goodwin Sands and the Cinque Port town of Deal. The Walmer Lifeboat spent over 50 hours afloat, giving assistance and saving lives. Forty-eight survivors were brought ashore in the first hours of the emergency after which the ship's officers, the skipper's wife and two children were also taken safely to Walmer Lifeboat Station. During this time Yousuf Baksh's captain, Mahmood Ahmed remained aboard his vessel, relinquishing his bridge only after the Walmer Lifeboat returned with a doctor on board to treat a badly injured officer who later died – the only fatality. During the evening the ship ran aground at Sandwich Bay where the fires burnt out. Yousuf Bakhsh and its cargo were a total loss.

The fire fighter that lost his life was Reginald Deverson. There is a bench in St Mary's church yard, Eastry, Kent dedicated to his memory.
