= Battle of Dongshan =

1965 naval battle

- Part of Project National Glory
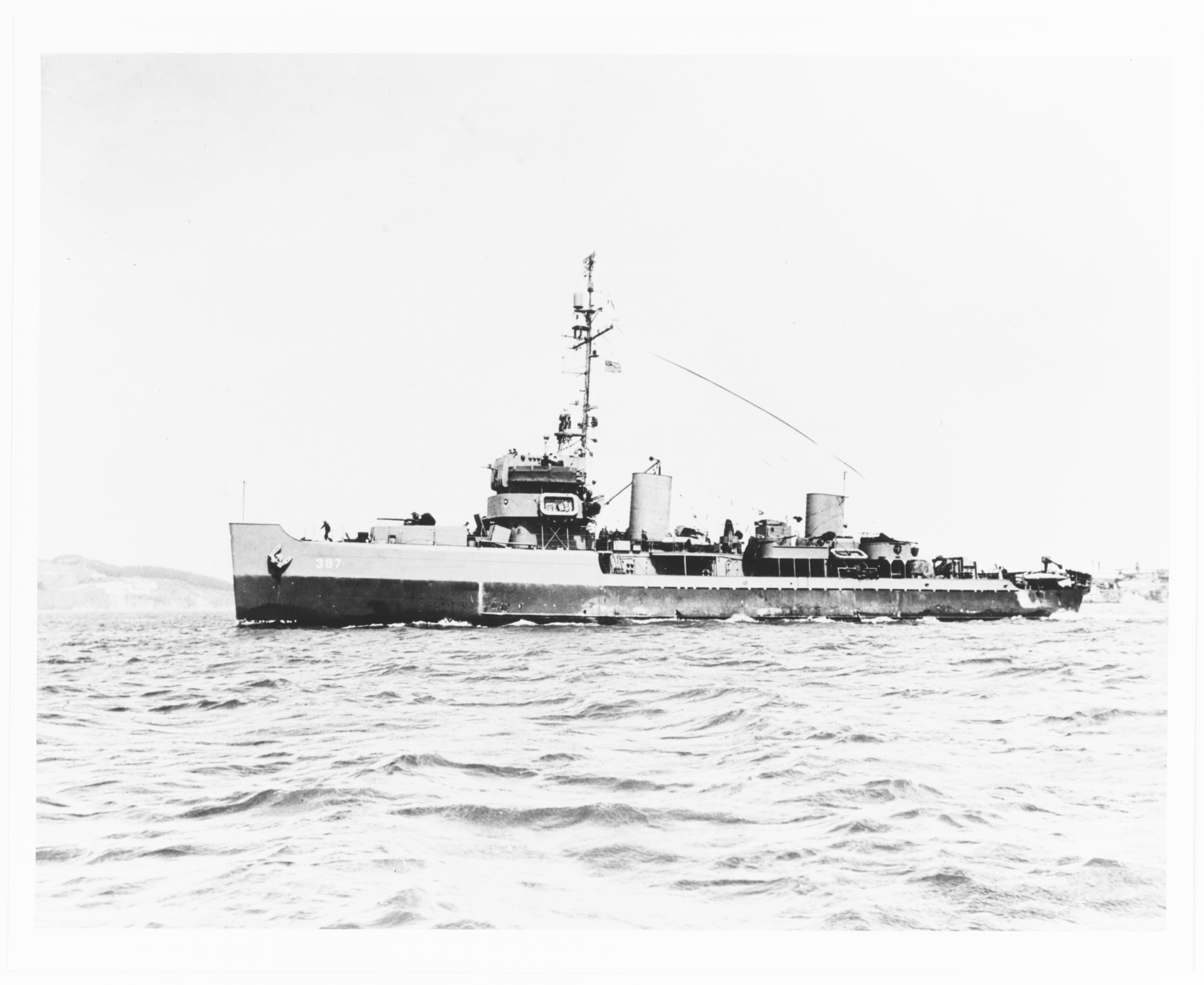
- ROCS Chien Men (formerly USS Toucan)
Date	6 August 1965
Location	Taiwan Strait 26.378°N 120.507°E
Result	People's Republic of China victory

Belligerents
Republic of China (Taiwan)	People's Republic of China

Commanders and leaders
Hu Jiaheng †; Li Zhuan †; Wang Yunshan (POW)	Wu Ruilin; Kong Zhaonian; Wang Jin; Cui Yudong; Liu Weihuan; Zhang Shouying

Units involved
Republic of China Navy	People's Liberation Army Navy

Strength
1 Auk-class minesweeper: Chien Men; 1 submarine chaser: Chang Kiang	Attack Group: 4 Patrol boats; 6 PT boats; Reinforcement Group: 1 Patrol boat; 6 PT boats

Casualties and losses
Both ships sunk; 170 killed; 33 captured	2 patrol boats damaged; 2 PT boats damaged; 4 killed; 28 wounded

The Battle of Dongshan (Chinese: 東山海戰), also known as the Battle of August Sixth (Chinese: 八六海戰), was a naval battle fought between the Republic of China and the People's Republic of China on 6 August 1965.

== Background ==
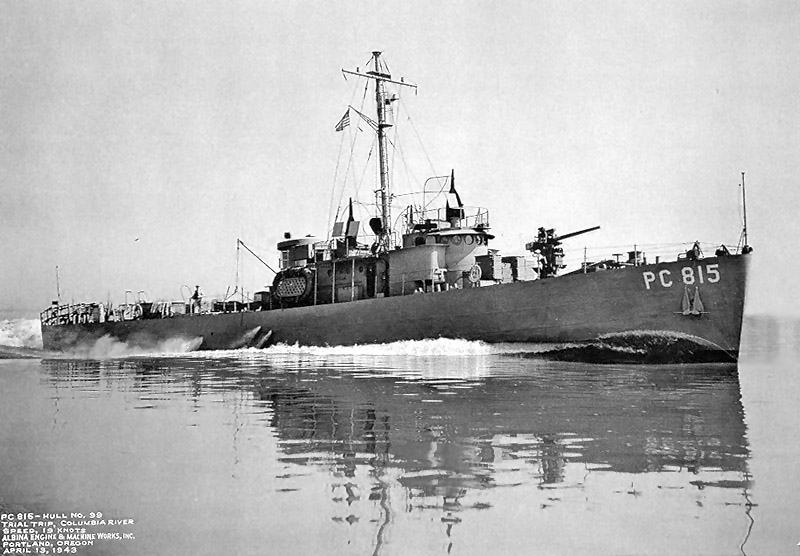
Chang Kiang was a PC-461-class submarine chaser. Formerly known as PC-1262 in service with the United States Navy.

In 1963, after China experienced difficulties from the Great Leap Forward and the Great Chinese Famine, the ROC Defense Ministry took the opportunity to create a plan to retake the mainland known as Project National Glory.

On 14 July 1965, Chiang Kai-shek visited the ROC Navy Navy headquarters and instructed his admirals "to reach the mainland’s coastline and probe the PLA's responses". On 30 July, the ROC navy planned Operation Tsunami No. 1 in which the army would land a special force unit at Dongshan Island destroying the radar station and capturing PLA prisoners there.

After the plan was approved by the Defense Ministry, the ROC navy assigned Rear Admiral Hu Jiaheng, commander of the Second Fleet, to command two submarine hunters, Chien Men and Chang Kiang, to carry out the attack plan on 6 August. Chien Men previously operated with the United States Navy as USS Toucan and was transferred to the ROC in 1965 while Chang Kiang was a former United States Navy PC-461-class submarine chaser that was transferred to the ROC in 1954. Chien Men was under the command of Commodore Wang Yunshan while Chang Kiang was under Lieutenant Commander Li Zhuan.

== Operation ==
=== Planning ===
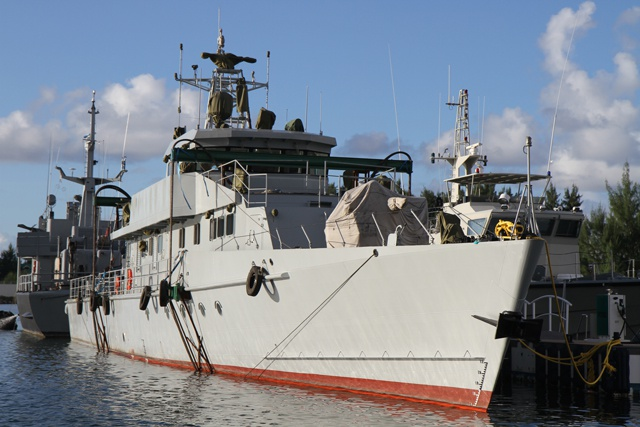
Shanghai-class Type 062 gunboat

Hu led his fleet and the special force unit, departing from the Zuoying Naval Base around 5 a.m. on 5 August. After setting sail, both ships shut down their onboard communication to avoid PLA radar detection.

The PLAN received intelligence in Beijing that the two ROC ships had left and informed the South Sea Fleet (SSF) Command in Guangzhou at 5:45 p.m. Around the same time, two PLAN front radar stations also spotted the ROC ships moving towards the mainland coast. The SSF commander, Lieutenant General Wu Ruilin decided to take part in the battle.

At 7 p.m. on 5 August 1965, Wu made a plan by using both patrol boats and PT boats to attack the two ROC ships. The patrol boats included newly commissioned Shanghai-class Type 062 gunboats. The battle tactics were to employ the patrol boats to provide gunfire to silence the enemy guns and cover the PT boats as they engaged in high-speed charging and torpedo launchings to sink the two ROC ships. A task squadron consisting of 5 patrol boats and 12 PT boats was formed. It was split into an Attack Group consisting of 4 patrol boats and 6 PT boats and a Reinforcement Group consisting of 1 patrol boat and 6 PT boats. The Attack Group was led by Kong Zhaonian and Wang Jin who commanded the patrol boats while Cui Yudong commanded the PT boats. Liu Weihuan and Zhang Shouying commanded the Reinforcement Group. Wu asked the radar stations to confirm the two ROC ships were not American and report on their movement every ten minutes.

=== Battle ===
Wu assigned the overall mission to Kong and instructed him to concentrate his firepower and try to destroy one enemy ship at the time. At 9:24 p.m. on 5 August 1965, Kong led the first group of four PC boats departing from Shantou for the interception site east of Xiongdi Island, eighteen miles (29 km) southeast from the Dongshan Islands. At 11:43 pm, the first group of six PT boats left Haimen to meet the group at the interception site. As they only had lower-power radars, they depended on land-based high-power radars to provide enemy positions and battle directions.

Around the same time at 11 pm, following Operation Tsunami No. 1, Hu landed the special force unit at Dongshan Island. Since the PLAN did not have any large warships like frigates or destroyers along the Fujian and Guangdong coast, Hu was not concerned.

After confirming the enemy ships' movement, the PLA General Staff approved the SSF plan at 11:10 p.m. with Zhou Enlai's instructions. Wu was instructed to make sure they were ROC ships (not PRC or foreign); to let the enemy ships in closer; to attack within thirty nautical miles (56 km; 35 mi) of the shore; to concentrate firepower; to attack in the night, and to disengage before dawn.

The SSF HQ had miscalculated the direction and speed of the two ROC ships and when the Attack Group reached the interception site at 12:31 a.m. on 6 August, the two ROC ships had already passed the point and were about fourteen nautical miles (26 km; 16 mi) away. The planned interception immediately turned into a chase.

==== Chang Kiang ====
At 1:42 a.m. the Attack Group spotted the two ROC east of the Xiongdi Islands. Around the same time, Hu received his radar report that Chien Men was being approached by the Attack Group. At 1:58 am, Hu ordered the 76.2-millimetre (3.00 in) guns to fire on them from six nautical miles (11 km; 6.9 mi) and then all the guns to fire on them from at four nautical miles (7.4 km; 4.6 mi). The Attack Group patrol ships only had two twin 37 mm (1.5 in) and two twin 25 mm (0.98 in) guns and therefore were outranged. Kong ordered the Group to make close contact with the two ROC ships at high speed without firing. Chien Men turned east and fled as a result.

After Chien Men disappeared in the dark, at 2:41 am. Kong ordered the patrol boats to advance to about three cable lengths from Chang Kiang and then open fire from 500 to 100 metres (550 to 110 yd) targeting the guns, bridge and crew members on the deck of Chang Kiang. Li Zhuan made a sharp right turn and let the patrol boats pass. However the patrol boats launched a second attack which Li did not expect which killed many crew members and caused a fire on the deck. During the third attack around 2:54 am, two patrol boats were hit by several shells with one suffering significant casualties and the other losing three of its four engines. Engineer Mai Xiande who was on the second patrol boat was wounded severely but continued to operate in the engine room so the boat could continue to fire at Chang Kiang. At the same time Kong ordered the PT boats to launch torpedoes but they all missed their attack opportunities due to lack of communication and radar guidance leading them to go in the wrong direction and firing mistakenly at a large rock. Five out of six PT boats returned to the base after running out of torpedoes. After the failed PT boat attack, Kong ordered a fourth attack instructing to fire armor-piercing shells below the waterline of Chang Kiang.

After an hour of fighting, Li changed the tactics from avoiding the PLAN fire to facing the patrol boats. Chang Kiang turned around and headed toward the PCs to break the attack formation. It worked for a while with the patrol boats running in different directions and firing on their own. However, Kong regrouped them and launched a fifth attack. Eventually Chang Kiang caught fire and its ammunition exploded during the sixth attack. After a ninety-minute fight, Chang Kiang sank around 3:33 a.m. at twenty-five nautical miles (46 km; 29 mi) southeast of Dongshan Island. Li and most of his crew were lost at sea.

==== Chien Men ====
When Chang Kiang was sunk, Chien Men lingered about five miles (8.0 km)s from the battle site. Hu waited for the ROC Air Force to provide support that he had requested. Wang suggested that they immediately return to Taiwan but Hu refused instead wanting ROC bomber aircraft to retaliate by attacking the PLAN task squadron at dawn (due to lack of night bombing experience at sea) and turn the battle situation around.

While Chien Men waited, Kong received orders from Wu to attack Chien Men. He ordered three patrol boats and five PT boats to get into a new attack formation and pursue Chien Men before the ROC Air Force could reach his forces. At 4:40 am, Wang discovered the patrol boats about three miles (4.8 km) away from Chien Men and ordered his artillery to fire on them. Kong ordered the patrol boats not to fire while keeping up a high-speed charge. At 5:10 am, after the patrol boats had closed to about seven cable lengths of Chien Men, they opened fire. During the second attack on Chien Men's deck, Hu was killed on the bridge. Meanwhile, the PT boats from the Reinforcement Group had reached their firing position about two cable lengths from Chien Men. At 5:19 am, Zhang ordered the PT boats to launch torpedoes at Chien Men with three out of ten hitting the ROC ship. At 5:22 am, Chien Men began to sink thirty-eight nautical miles (70 km; 44 mi) southeast of Dongshan. Hu and 170 sailors and soldiers were killed. Wang and 33 sailors were captured. When Kong and his men were picking up the survivors, four ROC bombers came to the area but eight PLAN fighter aircraft also appeared leading the ROC bombers to turn back. The battle was a victory for the PLAN with the two ROC ships being sunk. The PLAN had four PLAN officers and sailors killed, twenty-eight wounded, and two Patrol boats and two PT boats damaged.

== Aftermath ==
On 9 August, the PLAN sent the battle report to the high command. Their report described the 6 August battle as "the largest victory of naval engagements in recent years" and stated it proved small boats can attack and sink large warships. On 15 August, Mao Zedong read and approved the report.

On 17 August, Kong and several representatives met with PRC leaders including Mao, Zhou, Liu Shaoqi and Deng Xiaoping to give a battle presentation. Zhou concluded naval warfare should be fought like land warfare in close combat under a night attack that concentrates the forces, separate the enemies and destroy them individually after they have been isolated. The PLAN realized the new Shanghai-class patrol boats made a big difference in combat because they had better speed and stronger firepower than the 1955 Guangzhou-class patrol boats. As a result, the PLAN began to emphasize the importance of technology development. The PRC Defense Ministry granted the title of "Battle Hero" to engineer Mai. It was the first time in PLA history that a technician was honored as a battle hero, an indication that the PLAN had shifted its emphasis to machine and technology in battle rather than individual men.

ROC military leaders blamed their naval failure on their underestimation of the PLAN's combat effectiveness, lack of cooperation between the navy and air force, poor training in fighting against small speedboats, poor communication and information, and outdated equipment. Chiang believed that the navy ignored the enemy, so their warships were not prepared for a night attack. He also blamed the air force for being unable to provide effective air protection before the two ships were destroyed. On 11 August, Admiral Liu Guangkai who was Commander of the ROC Navy was stripped from his position despite pleas from American naval advisers to give him a second chance. Liu pointed out the problems in naval planning, arguing that Operation Tsunami No. 1 was designed for such a battle disaster. His subordinates believed the PLAN could only attack small gunboats and would avoid large warships since it did not have any. The PLAN task squadron was near the coast and had more accurate information thanks to the land based radars while the two ROC ships were on their own and did not know they were pursued until it was too late. In addition, the ROC navy failed to share information with the ROC air force in a timely manner with the ROC bombers taking over two hours to get ready to launch after Hu's call.

== Sources ==
- Li, Xiaobing (15 October 2023). China's New Navy: The Evolution of PLAN from the People's Revolution to a 21st Century Cold War. Naval Institute Press. ISBN 978-1-68247-809-7.
- Ryan, Mark A.; Finkelstein, David M.; McDevitt, Michael A.; Corporation, C. N. A. (29 April 2016). Chinese Warfighting: The PLA Experience since 1949: The PLA Experience since 1949. Routledge. ISBN 978-1-134-94250-3.
- Wortzel, Larry M. (30 September 1999). Dictionary of Contemporary Chinese Military History. Bloomsbury Publishing USA. ISBN 978-1-56750-976-2.
