= MV Pozarica (1945) =

1945 Dutch cargo ship

History
- Name: Hermes (1945-49); Empire Dove (1949-53); Pozarica (1953-64); Blue Fin (1964-65)
- Owner: Koninklijke Nederlandsche Stoomboot Maatschappij (1945); Ministry of War Transport (1945); Ministry of Transport (1945-49); MacAndrews & Co Ltd (1949-64); Sociedad Anónima Letas (1964-65)
- Operator: MacAndrews & Co Ltd (1949-64); Sociedad Anónima Letas (1964-65)
- Port of registry: United Kingdom (1946-1964); Spain (1964-65)
- Builder: NV Scheepswerke Gebroeders Pot
- Laid down: 1940
- Launched: 1945
- Completed: 1949
- Out of service: 28 November 1965
- Fate: Sank

General characteristics
- Type: Cargo ship
- Tonnage: 2,503 GRT
- Length: 105.16 m (345 ft 0 in)
- Beam: 14.63 m (48 ft 0 in)
- Propulsion: Diesel engine

Pozarica was a 2,503 GRT cargo ship that was built in 1945 as Hermes by NV Scheepswerke Gebroeders Pot, Bolnes, South Holland, Netherlands for the Koninklijke Nederlandsche Stoomboot Maatschappij. She was seized by the British in an incomplete state in May 1945. She was passed to the Ministry of War Transport (MoWT) and renamed Empire Dove. The ship was completed during 1946. She was sold into merchant service in 1949 and renamed Pozarica in 1953. In 1964, she was sold to Spain and renamed Blue Fin. On 27 November 1965, she lost her rudder in a storm in the Bay of Biscay. Although the ship was taken under tow, her cargo shifted the next day and she sank.

== Description ==
The ship was built in 1945 by NV Scheepswerke Gebroeders Pot, Bolnes.

The ship was 105.16 metres (345 ft 0 in) long, with a beam of 14.63 metres (48 ft 0 in). She was assessed at 2,503 GRT.

The ship was propelled by a diesel engine.

== History ==
The ship was laid down in 1940. Intended to be named Hermes for the Koninklijke Nederlandsche Stoomboot Maatschappij, she was seized in May 1945 in an incomplete state. In 1949 the ship was completed in Germany as Empire Dove. She was operated under the management of MacAndrews & Co Ltd, London, being sold to them in 1949. Empire Dove was renamed Pozarica in 1953. On 3 July 1957, Pozarica had to be fumigated as her cargo of Spanish onions was infested with Colorado beetles.

In 1964, Pozarica was sold to Sociedad Anónima Letas, Spain. On 27 November 1965, she lost her rudder in a storm in the Bay of Biscay. The ship was taken in tow, but on 28 November her cargo shifted and she sank 60 nautical miles (110 km) west of La Rochelle, Charente-Maritime, France.
