= USS Refresh =

Minesweeper of the United States Navy

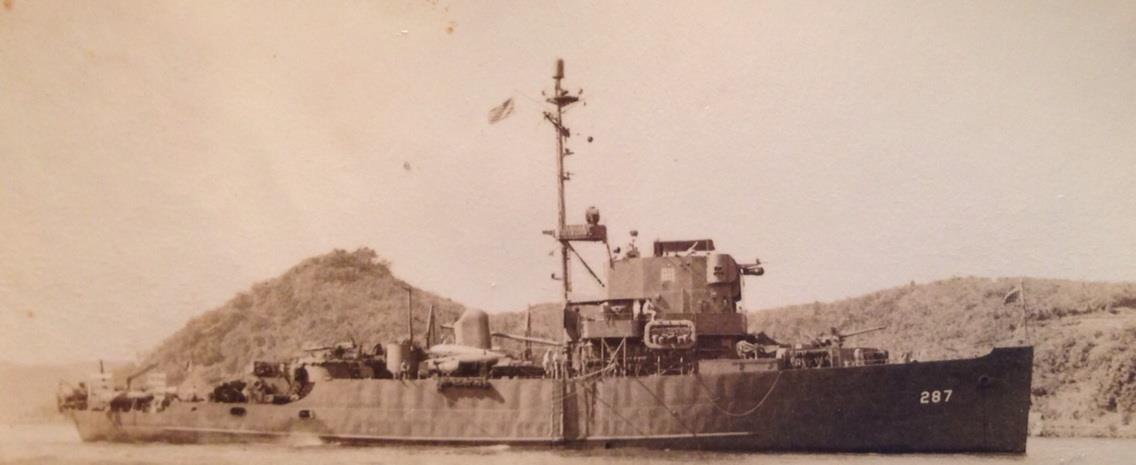

History

United States
- Name: USS Refresh
- Builder: General Engineering & Dry Dock Company, Alameda, California
- Laid down: 22 September 1943
- Launched: 12 April 1944
- Commissioned: 10 April 1945
- Decommissioned: 9 November 1946
- Fate: Transferred to the Republic of China, 30 June 1948
- Stricken: 13 July 1948

History

Taiwan
- Name: ROCS Yung Chang (AM 51)
- Acquired: 30 June 1948
- Fate: Sunk at the Battle of East Chongwu on 14 November 1965

General characteristics
- Class & type: Admirable-class minesweeper
- Displacement: 650 tons
- Length: 184 ft 6 in (56.24 m)
- Beam: 33 ft (10 m)
- Draft: 9 ft 9 in (2.97 m)
- Propulsion: 2 × ALCO 539 diesel engines, 1,710 shp (1.3 MW); Farrel-Birmingham single reduction gear; 2 shafts
- Speed: 14.8 knots (27.4 km/h)
- Complement: 104
- Armament: 1 × 3"/50 caliber gun DP; 2 × twin Bofors 40 mm guns; 1 × Hedgehog anti-submarine mortar; 2 × Depth charge tracks

Service record
- Part of: US Pacific Fleet (1945-1946)
- Awards: 2 Battle stars

USS Refresh (hull number AM-287) was an Admirable-class minesweeper built for the U.S. Navy during World War II. She was built to clear minefields in offshore waters, and served the Navy in the Pacific Ocean. Post-war, her crew returned home with two battle stars to their credit.

The ship itself was given to the Republic of China Navy in June 1948, initially renamed ROCS Yung Chang (AM-51), and sometime later renamed Lin Huai. Following 17 years of service with its second navy, Lin Huai was hit by a PLA Navy torpedo and sunk during the Battle of East Chongwu in November 1965.

== Career ==
Refresh, a minesweeper, was laid down 22 September 1943 by the General Engineering & Dry Dock Company, of Alameda, California, launched 12 April 1944, sponsored by Miss Muriel Maddox of San Francisco, California; and, commissioned 10 April 1945.

Following a Pacific coast shakedown out of San Pedro, California, Refresh reported to Commander in Chief, Pacific for duty 9 June 1945. After a call at Pearl Harbor, she departed 1 July for Okinawa via Eniwetok and Guam. Arriving Buckner Bay 31 July, she joined Commander, Mine Squadron 15 and began minesweeping operations in the Okinawa area 13 August. The last week of August she swept the approaches to Jinsen, Korea, and operated in the Yellow Sea through 7 September.

During the remainder of September, Refresh assisted task group TG 52.3 in minesweeping operations in the East China Sea approaches to Nagasaki and Sasebo, Japan, and in the Goto Archipelago, primarily in the area of Fukse, southwest of Kyūshū. Arriving Sasebo 1 October, Refresh was assigned several hydrographic missions, conducting soundings in shoal waters southwest of Kagoshima, Kyūshū, Japan. After upkeep in Sasebo, she continued to operate in Japanese waters through the new year.

Calling at Pearl Harbor 8–26 March 1946, Refresh then proceeded to San Pedro, California, arriving 4 April. Designated for transfer to the Chinese Navy 29 April 1946, she sailed for Subic Bay, Philippine Islands 17 September, decommissioned there 9 November 1946, was delivered to the Chinese 30 June 1948, and struck from the Navy list 13 July 1948. She served in the Navy of the Republic of China as Yung Chang (AM 51). She was sunk on 14 November 1965 at the Battle of East Chongwu.

Refresh received two battle stars for World War II service.
