= Legislative Yuan elections =

Taiwanese parliamentary elections

In Taiwan, parliamentary elections are held every four years to elect the 113 members of the Legislative Yuan, the unicameral legislature of Taiwan. The current electoral system was introduced in 2008. The constitutional amendments of 2005 extended term length from three to four years, reduced seat count from 225 to 113, and abolished the National Assembly, originally another governmental organ equivalent to a chamber of parliament.

== Current electoral system ==
Members are elected by parallel voting:

- 73 members by first-past-the-post in single-member districts
- 6 by single non-transferable voting in multi-member districts, exclusive for persons with indigenous status
- 34 by party-list proportional representation voting

=== Single-member constituencies ===
The delimitation of the single-member constituencies within the cities and counties was initially a major political issue in the early years, with bargaining between the government and the legislature. Of the 15 cities and counties to be partitioned (the ten others have only one seat), only seven of the districting schemes proposed by the CEC were approved in a normal way. The eight other schemes were decided by drawing lots: "Taipei and Taichung cities and Miaoli and Changhua counties will adopt the version suggested by the CEC, while Kaohsiung city will follow the consensus of the legislature. Taipei county will follow the proposal offered by the opposition Taiwan Solidarity Union, Taoyuan county will adopt the ruling Democratic Progressive Party's scheme, and Pingtung county will use the scheme agreed upon by the Non-partisan Solidarity Union, People First Party, Kuomintang and Taiwan Solidarity Union."

Under Articles 35 and 37 of the Civil Servants Election and Recall Act, the electoral constituencies are to be revised every ten years based on population density. Demographic data is obtained by investigation of household registration and should be compiled two years and two months before the tenure of current legislators end. The Central Election Commission reviews the boundaries, then submits any proposed alterations to the Legislative Yuan 20 months before the election for final consent and announcement.

=== Indigenous districts ===
Six seats are reserved for indigenous peoples. They are elected by single non-transferable vote in two 3-member constituencies for lowland aborigines and highland aborigines respectively. This system did not fulfil the promise in the treaty-like document A New Partnership Between the Indigenous Peoples and the Government of Taiwan, where each of the 13 recognised indigenous peoples was to get at least one seat, and the distinction between highland and lowland abolished.

=== Party-list ===
Seats are allocated using the largest remainder method with the Hare quota which, with 34 seats, is 2.9412%. A party's vote share must exceed a threshold of 5% to win any seats. Votes for parties which do not pass the threshold are first excluded. The vote share for the remaining parties are calculated. A party is allocated one seat for every 2.9412% of votes. The remaining seats are allocated in succession to the party with the largest remainder.

For each party, at least half of the legislators elected under this system must be female. Therefore, with an odd number of seats, females will always outnumber males.

== Parliamentary elections since 1991 ==
Year	Chamber Order		Seat composition	Political parties by popular vote			
Year	Chamber Order		Seat composition	Political party	Constituency	Party list	Seats
1991	NA	2		Kuomintang	6,053,366	Refer to constituency	254
1991	NA	2		Democratic Progressive	2,036,271	Refer to constituency	66
1991	NA	2		Democratic Nonpartisan Union	193,234	Refer to constituency	3
1991	NA	2		Independents	253,032	—	2
1992	LY	2		Kuomintang	5,030,725	Refer to constituency	95
1992	LY	2		Democratic Progressive	2,944,195	Refer to constituency	51
1992	LY	2		Chinese Social Democratic	126,213	Refer to constituency	1
1992	LY	2		Independents	1,331,555	—	14
1995	LY	3		Kuomintang	4,349,089	Refer to constituency	85
1995	LY	3		Democratic Progressive	3,132,156	Refer to constituency	54
1995	LY	3		New	1,222,931	Refer to constituency	21
1995	LY	3		Independents	730,529	—	4
1996	NA	3		Kuomintang	5,180,829	Refer to constituency	183
1996	NA	3		Democratic Progressive	3,112,736	Refer to constituency	99
1996	NA	3		New	1,425,896	Refer to constituency	46
1996	NA	3		Green Party Taiwan	113,942	Refer to constituency	1
1996	NA	3		Independents	572,961	—	5
1998	LY	4		Kuomintang	4,659,679	Refer to constituency	123
1998	LY	4		Democratic Progressive	2,966,835	Refer to constituency	70
1998	LY	4		New	708,465	Refer to constituency	11
1998	LY	4		Democratic Union	375,118	Refer to constituency	4
1998	LY	4		Democratic Nonpartisan Union	66,033	Refer to constituency	3
1998	LY	4		New Nation Alliance	157,826	Refer to constituency	1
1998	LY	4		Taiwan Independence	145,118	Refer to constituency	1
1998	LY	4		Independents	946,431	—	12
2001	LY	5		Democratic Progressive	3,447,740	Refer to constituency	87
2001	LY	5		Kuomintang	2,949,371	Refer to constituency	68
2001	LY	5		People First	1,917,836	Refer to constituency	46
2001	LY	5		Taiwan Solidarity Union	801,560	Refer to constituency	13
2001	LY	5		New	269,620	Refer to constituency	1
2001	LY	5		Taiwan Number One	12,917	Refer to constituency	1
2001	LY	5		Independents	899,254	—	9
2004	LY	6		Democratic Progressive	3,471,429	Refer to constituency	89
2004	LY	6		Kuomintang	3,190,081	Refer to constituency	79
2004	LY	6		People First	1,350,613	Refer to constituency	34
2004	LY	6		Taiwan Solidarity Union	756,712	Refer to constituency	12
2004	LY	6		Non-Partisan Solidarity Union	353,164	Refer to constituency	6
2004	LY	6		New	12,137	Refer to constituency	1
2004	LY	6		Independents	577,292	—	4
2005	NA	ad hoc		Democratic Progressive	Party list only	1,647,791	127
2005	NA	ad hoc		Kuomintang	Party list only	1,508,384	117
2005	NA	ad hoc		Taiwan Solidarity Union	Party list only	273,147	21
2005	NA	ad hoc		People First	Party list only	236,716	18
2005	NA	ad hoc		Other parties	Party list only	209,560	17
2008	LY	7		Kuomintang	5,291,512	5,010,801	81
2008	LY	7		Democratic Progressive	3,775,352	3,610,106	27
2008	LY	7		Non-Partisan Solidarity Union	239,317	68,527	3
2008	LY	7		People First	28,254	—	1
2008	LY	7		Independents	393,346	—	1
2012	LY	8		Kuomintang	6,339,301	5,863,379	64
2012	LY	8		Democratic Progressive	5,763,186	4,556,526	40
2012	LY	8		Taiwan Solidarity Union	—	1,178,896	3
2012	LY	8		People First	175,032	722,089	3
2012	LY	8		Non-Partisan Solidarity Union	168,861	—	2
2012	LY	8		Independents	532,270	—	1
2016	LY	9		Democratic Progressive	5,416,683	5,370,953	68
2016	LY	9		Kuomintang	4,724,394	3,280,949	35
2016	LY	9		New Power	351,244	744,315	5
2016	LY	9		People First	156,212	794,383	3
2016	LY	9		Non-Partisan Solidarity Union	27,690	77,672	1
2016	LY	9		Independents	668,446	—	1
2020	LY	10		Democratic Progressive	6,383,783	4,811,241	61
2020	LY	10		Kuomintang	5,761,995	4,723,504	38
2020	LY	10		Taiwan People's	264,478	1,588,806	5
2020	LY	10		New Power	141,952	1,098,100	3
2020	LY	10		Statebuilding	141,503	447,286	1
2020	LY	10		Independents	1,086,463	—	5
2024	LY	11		Kuomintang	5,401,933	4,764,576	52
2024	LY	11		Democratic Progressive	6,095,276	4,982,062	51
2024	LY	11		Taiwan People's	403,357	3,040,615	8
2024	LY	11		Independents	1,069,758	—	2

== Early parliamentary supplementary elections (1969–1989) ==
According to the interpretation of the Constitutional Court (Judicial Yuan), under the original constitution the National Assembly, Legislative Yuan, and Control Yuan were seen to constitute the Parliament in Taiwan. After 20 years of relocating the government to Taiwan, the Kuomintang-led government of the Republic of China amended the Temporary Provisions against the Communist Rebellion to start limited parliamentary elections. Delegates of the National Assembly and members of the Legislative Yuan are directly elected, while members of the Control Yuan were indirectly elected by the provincial legislatures. The elected members served together with existing members elected by the 1947 Chinese National Assembly election, the 1948 Chinese legislative election, and the 1947-1948 Chinese Control Yuan election in the respective chambers.

Year	Chamber/Order		Seat composition	Political party	Seats			
Year	Chamber/Order		Seat composition	Political party	Direct election	Indirect election	Presidential appointment	Total
1969	NA	supp.		Kuomintang	15	—	—	15
1969	LY	supp.		Kuomintang	8	—	—	11
1969	LY	supp.		Independents	3	—	—	11
1969	CY	supp.		Kuomintang	—	1	—	2
1969	CY	supp.		Independents	—	1	—	2
1972	NA	1st supp.		Kuomintang	43	—	—	53
1972	NA	1st supp.		Independents	10	—	—	53
1972	LY	1st supp.		Kuomintang	30	—	11	51
1972	LY	1st supp.		Chinese Youth	1	—	0	51
1972	LY	1st supp.		Independents	5	—	4	51
1973	CY	1st supp.		Kuomintang	—	9	4	15
1973	CY	1st supp.		China Democratic Socialist	—	1	0	15
1973	CY	1st supp.		Independents	—	0	1	15
1975	LY	2nd supp.		Kuomintang	30	—	13	52
1975	LY	2nd supp.		Chinese Youth	1	—	0	52
1975	LY	2nd supp.		Independents	6	—	2	52
1980	NA	2nd supp.		Kuomintang	63	—	—	76
1980	NA	2nd supp.		China Democratic Socialist	1	—	—	76
1980	NA	2nd supp.		Independents	12	—	—	76
1980	LY	3rd supp.		Kuomintang	58	—	23	97
1980	LY	3rd supp.		Chinese Youth	0	—	2	97
1980	LY	3rd supp.		Independents	12	—	2	97
1980	CY	2nd supp.		Kuomintang	—	16	5	32
1980	CY	2nd supp.		Chinese Youth	—	1	0	32
1980	CY	2nd supp.		China Democratic Socialist	—	0	1	32
1980	CY	2nd supp.		Independents	—	5	4	32
1983	LY	4th supp.		Kuomintang	62	—	21	98
1983	LY	4th supp.		Chinese Youth	0	—	2	98
1983	LY	4th supp.		China Democratic Socialist	0	—	1	98
1983	LY	4th supp.		Independents	9	—	3	98
1986	NA	3rd supp.		Kuomintang	68	—	—	84
1986	NA	3rd supp.		Democratic Progressive	11	—	—	84
1986	NA	3rd supp.		China Democratic Socialist	1	—	—	84
1986	NA	3rd supp.		Independents	4	—	—	84
1986	LY	5th supp.		Kuomintang	59	—	20	100
1986	LY	5th supp.		Democratic Progressive	12	—	0	100
1986	LY	5th supp.		Chinese Youth	0	—	2	100
1986	LY	5th supp.		China Democratic Socialist	0	—	1	100
1986	LY	5th supp.		Independents	2	—	4	100
1987	CY	3rd supp.		Kuomintang	—	17	7	32
1987	CY	3rd supp.		Chinese Youth	—	1	0	32
1987	CY	3rd supp.		China Democratic Socialist	—	0	1	32
1987	CY	3rd supp.		Independents	—	4	2	32
1989	LY	6th supp.		Kuomintang	72	—	22	130
1989	LY	6th supp.		Democratic Progressive	21	—	0	130
1989	LY	6th supp.		Chinese Youth	0	—	1	130
1989	LY	6th supp.		Independents	8	—	6	130

== See also ==
- Legislative Yuan constituencies
- Politics of Taiwan
- Presidential elections in Taiwan
- Elections in Taiwan
