= National Constituent Assembly (Republic of China) =

Constituent assembly of Democratic China

National Constituent Assembly 制憲國民大會
- National emblem of the Republic of China

History
- Founded: 15 November 1946
- Disbanded: 25 December 1946
- Preceded by: Political Consultative Conference
- Succeeded by: National Assembly

Leadership
- Presidium: Chiang Kai-shek and 47 others
- Secretary-general: Hung Lan-yu, KMT
- Seats: 2050

Meeting place
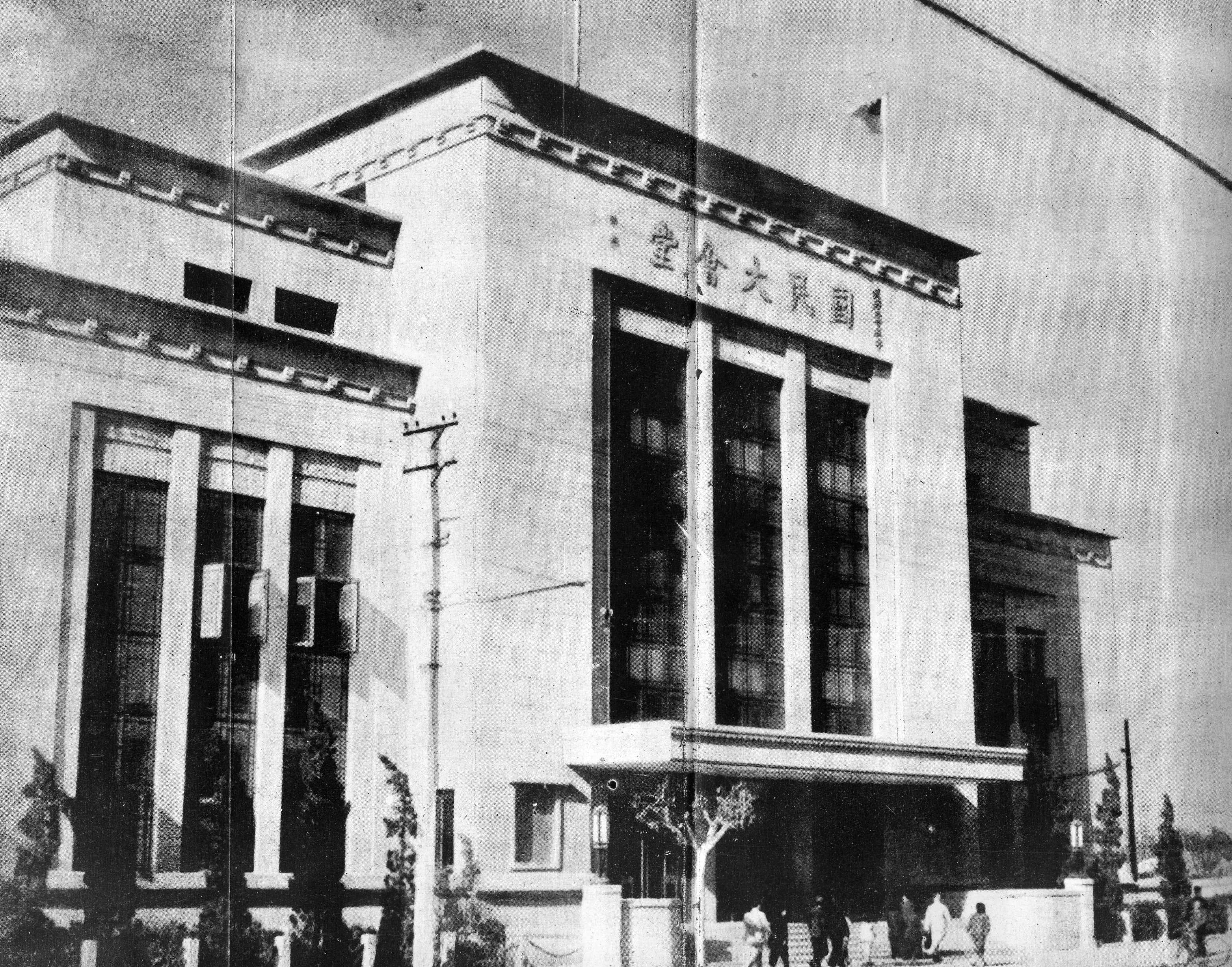
- National Great Hall, Nanjing

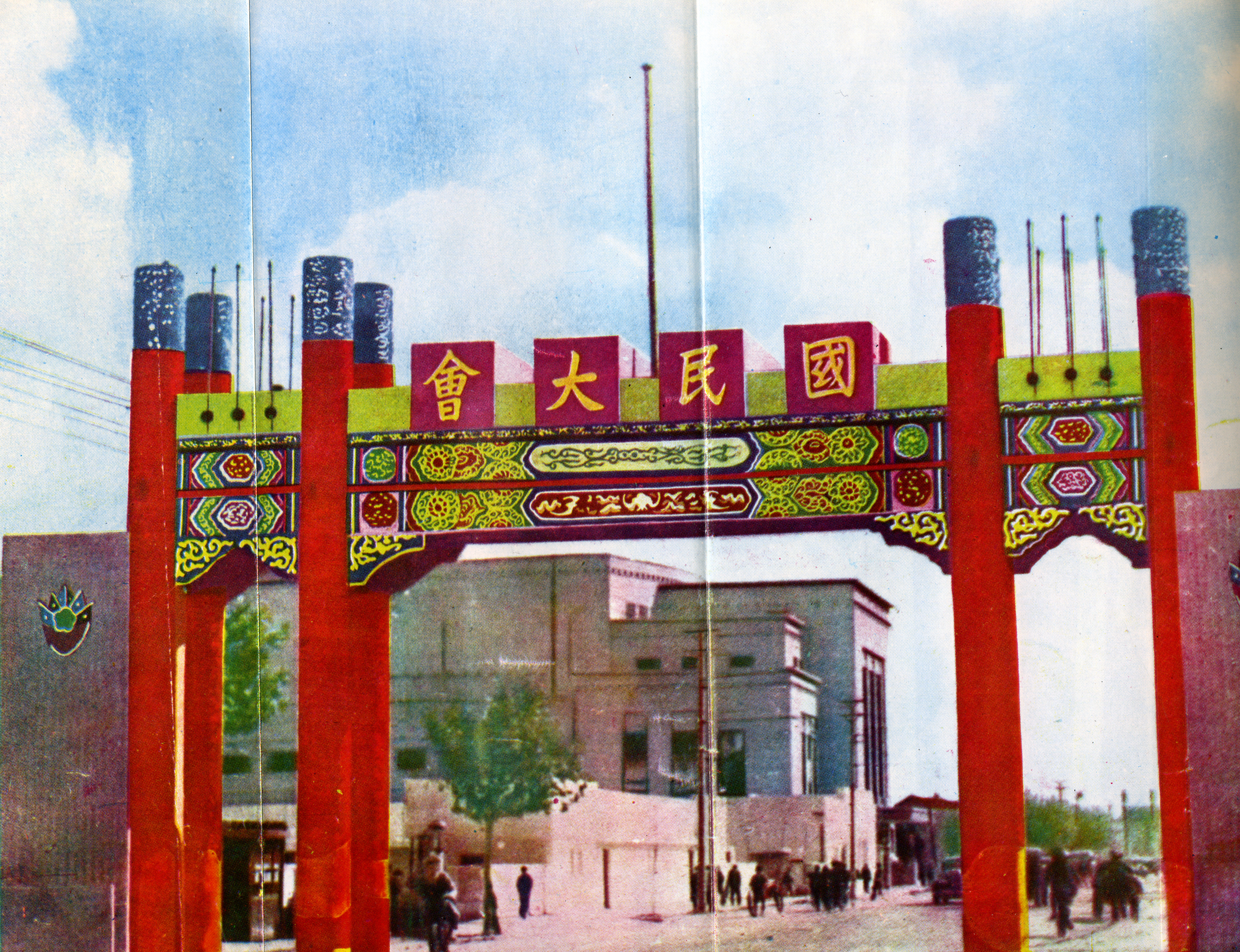
Paifang near the National Great Hall

The National Constituent Assembly (Chinese: 制憲國民大會) was a constituent assembly in China, assembled for drafting the Constitution of the Republic of China. Meetings were convened in November and December 1946 at National Great Hall, Nanjing.

Boycotted by Chinese Communist Party (CCP) and its allies, the Assembly was joined by Chinese Nationalist Party (or Kuomintang, KMT), Young China Party (Youth), and China Democratic Socialist Party (CDSP), with delegates directly or indirectly elected. The Constitution drafted by the Assembly was considered to have resulted in the issue of Two Chinas with distinct constitutions.

== Background ==
Under Plans (or Fundamentals) of National Reconstruction proposed by Sun Yat-sen, later honoured as founding father of the Republic of China, the revolution was divided into three stages: military-rule, political tutelage, and constitutional government.

One of the earliest constitutions of the Republic of China was promulgated by Cao Kun in 1923 (Tsao's Constitution; 曹錕憲法). The junta based in Canton, led by Sun from Kuomintang, boycotted the enactment and called for the convocation of National Convention for drafting a new constitution.

Following the Beijing Coup in 1924 that overthrown Cao's government, Sun accepted the invitation by Feng Yuxiang to convene National Convention. Sun, however, died in 1925 and the convention was abandoned. The will left by Sun before his death includes the convocation of such meetings.

The work of the Revolution is not yet done. Let all our comrades follow my Plans for National Reconstruction, Fundamentals of National Reconstruction, Three Principles of the People, and The Manifesto of the First National Convention of the Kuomintang, and strive on for their consummation. Above all, our recent declarations in favor of the convocation of a National Convention and abolition of unequal treaties should be carried into effect with the least possible delay. This is my heartfelt charge to you.

— The Founding Father's Will (excerpt)

Upon the conclusion of Northern Expedition in 1928, one-party rule by the KMT began and so was the drafting of the new constitution. In 1936, a new constitutional draft (May Fifth draft; 五五憲草) was announced.

The authorities decided to convene a National Constituent Assembly in 1937 to adopt the draft, only to be delayed by the Second Sino-Japanese War. The Assembly was further delayed to 1946 for various reasons.

Delay of National Constituent Assembly
Planned convocation	Proponent	Reason
12 November 1936	5th National Congress of KMT	Provincial elections underway
12 November 1937	3rd Plenary Session of 5th Central Committee of KMT	Outbreak of war
12 November 1940	6th Plenary Session of 5th Central Committee of KMT	Delegates in occupation zones unable to attend
12 November 1945	Nationalist Government	CCP demanded reforming government
5 May 1946	Political Consultative Conference	CCP declined to submit list of delegates
12 November 1946	Supreme Military Commission of Nationalist Government	Await submission of list of delegates by CCP, CDL

On 1 January 1946 or the 35th anniversary of the Republic of China, Chiang announced the decision of convening the Assembly by the end of the year. After six delays, the Assembly was finally convened on 15 November 1946 after Young China Party and China Democratic Socialist Party confirmed the attending delegates.

== Electoral method ==
An election was held in 1936 across the nation to elect members of the Assembly, except in Japanese-occupied Northeast China (Manchukuo) which special elections substituted direct elections. The Nationalist Government invited celebrities unwilling to campaign for the election to the Assembly, while members of KMT's Central Committee were designated as ex-officio members of the Assembly. CCP was unable to participate in the election due to KMT-CCP civil war and could only enter the Assembly with party-list quota. Tenure of the elected and selected members of the Assembly was extended to 1946 due to the delay of the Assembly.

=== Political Consultative Conference ===
After the victory in Sino-Japanese War in 1945, the Chinese Government was urged by the public to convene the Assembly. KMT and CCP, which by then became a substantial anti-government force, along with China Democratic League (CDL), Young China Party, and independents, (Note: 38 members of the Conference were: KMT (8), CCP (7), CDL (9), Youth (5), Ind. (9)) convened Political Consultative Conference on 10 January 1946 in Chongqing, wartime capital of the China. The Conference, lasted until 31 January, adopted 12 resolutions including reforming government, amending draft constitution, and convening National Constituent Assembly. A committee on organising draft constitution was also formed.

The membership quota of the National Constituent Assembly was one of the rifts between Nationalists and the Communists. CCP and CDL demanded disqualifying the members elected in 1936, while KMT insisted the membership was still legitimate and rejected the idea of disqualification for respecting the integrity of the government and the law. Both sides eventually compromised on disqualifying the unelected members of the Assembly, i.e., appointed members in special elections and ex-officio members of KMT's Central Committee, and replacing them with party representatives.

Resolution on National Assembly by Political Consultative Conference (translation)

1. The National Assembly to be convened on 5 May 1946.
2. The duties of the first session of the National Assembly shall be enacting the constitution.
3. The adoption of the constitution shall be agreed by three-fourths of attending members.
4. The membership of 1,200 delegates elected by Areas and Occupational Groups shall be unchanged.
5. Taiwan and Northeast shall be assigned with additional 150 delegates in total for Areas and Occupational Groups.
6. Political parties and dignitaries shall be assigned with additional 700 delegates; distribution of such shall be in accordance with the annexed terms.
7. The total number of delegates of the National Assembly shall be 2,050.
8. Authority for implementing constitutionalism as stipulated by the constitution shall, within six months upon promulgation of the constitution, hold elections and convene (the National Assembly) in accordance with the constitution.

Annex:

1. Representatives sent to the National Assembly by the political parties shall uphold the drafted constitution as amended in the Political Consultative Conference in the National Assembly.
2. Any advice on improving the constitution draft shall be decided after temporary consultation between the parties.
3. The distribution of additional delegates for political parties and dignitaries is as follows:
  1. Nationalist Party, 230 members
  2. Communist Party, 200 members
  3. Youth Party, 100 members
  4. Democratic League, 100 members
  5. Dignitaries, 100 members
4. The Nationalist Party and the Communist Party shall each yield 10 members to the Democratic League.

=== Civil war ===
Despite the new constitution draft (Conference Draft; 政協憲草) and other important agreements, the relation between the KMT and CCP worsened sharply after KMT's Central Committee meeting in March 1946 due to ideological differences and lack of mutual trust. Conflicts and skirmishes in Northeast broke out a month later.

Negotiations between two sides in Chongqing and Nanjing were also near breakdown. Over the membership of reformed coalition government, communists insisted on assigning 14 members to CCP and CDL out of 40 to secure one-third veto power. KMT, in return, only agreed on assigning 13. The standoff prolonged for more than half a year without much progress.

== Members ==
Delegates of the National Constituent Assembly

Statutory

Attending

Type	Statutory delegates	Attending delegates	Notes
Areas	770	735	Directly elected
Occupational groups	437	406	Elected by occupational groups
Special	143	142	Selected by the government
KMT representatives	220	216	
CCP representatives	190	0	Boycotted
CDL representatives	80	0	Boycotted (excluding CDSP)
CDSP representatives	40	39	Split from CDL
Youth representatives	100	99	
Dignitaries	70	64	Majority of independent members of National Political Assembly
Total	2,050	1,701	Quorum of 82.98%

== Session ==
=== Pre-meeting controversies ===
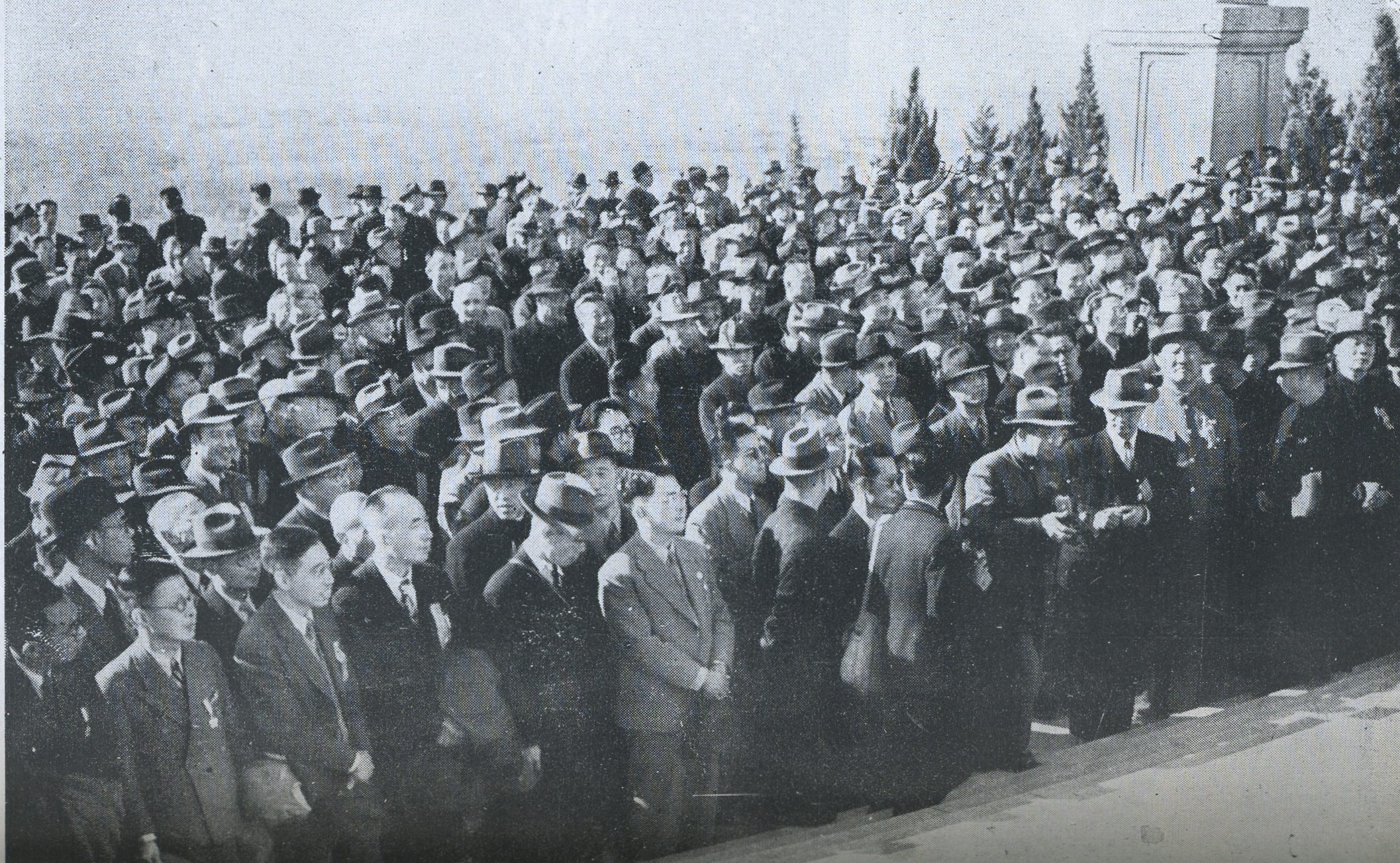
Delegates, led by Chiang, visited the mausoleum of Sun on 12 November 1946

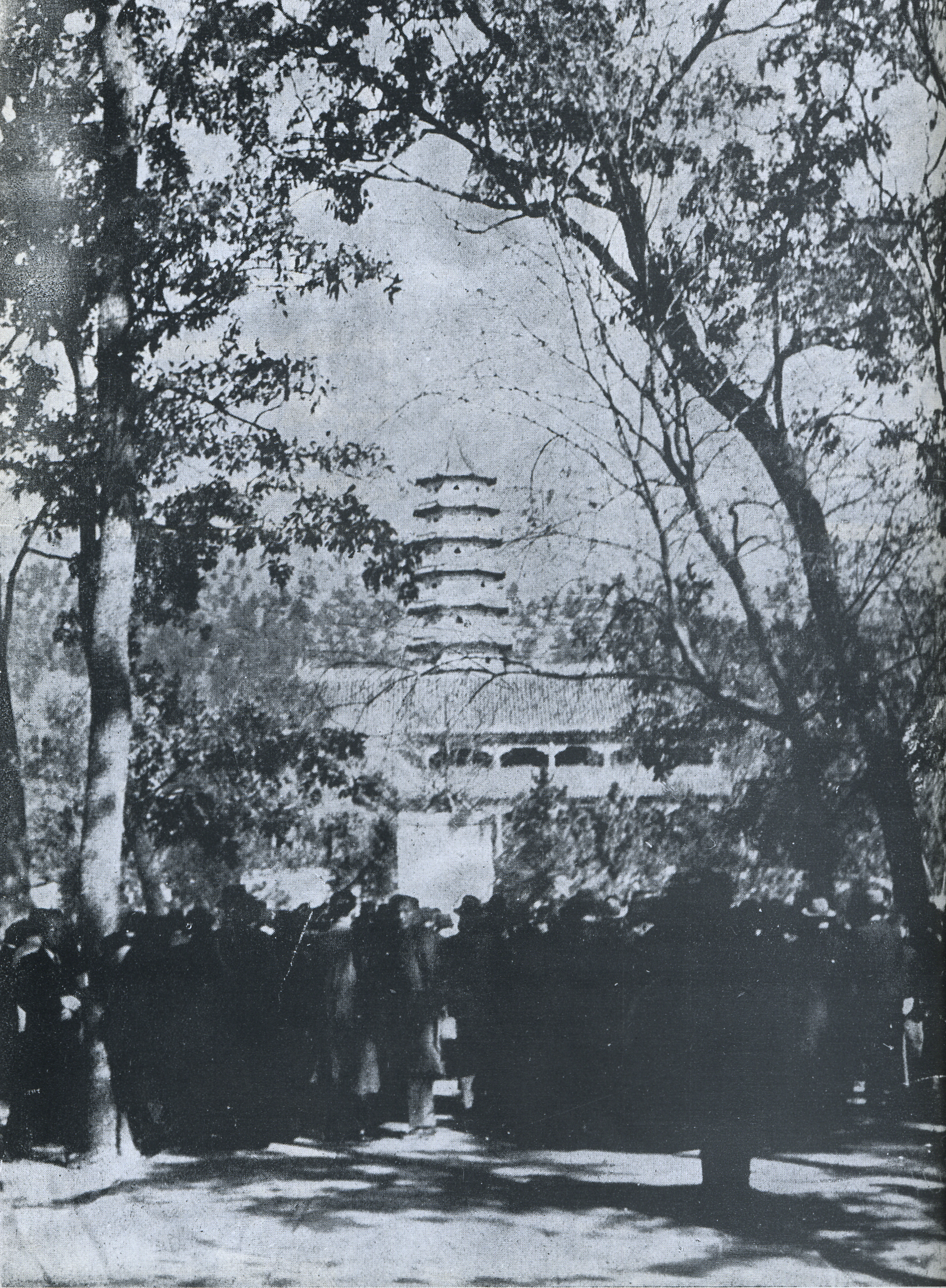
Delegates paid tribute at National Revolutionary Army Memorial Cemetery, Nanjing on 15 November 1946

According to resolution of Political Consultative Conference, the National Constituent Assembly shall be convened on 5 May 1946, anniversary of Sun's inauguration as "Extraordinary Great President" (非常大總統). Nevertheless, it was forced to delay as CCP and CDL declined to submit list of delegates amid stalled negotiations with KMT on reforming the government. The diplomatic mission by George C. Marshall, United States Special Envoy to China, to broker peace between two sides also failed.

With the aim of ending the party-rule as soon as possible, Kuomintang decided to convene, unilaterally, the National Assembly on 12 November, the birthday of Sun, claiming the Communists continued the armed rebellion. The decision was immediately opposed by CCP and CDL, then both decided to boycott the Assembly. Youth rested with the decision of participating, while CDSP split with CDL with the internally assigned quota of 40 delegates, hoping CDL would reverse their boycott. The Communists later described the decision of participating in the "puppet National Assembly" as the "touchstone" distinguishing whether the party is standing with the people.

=== Opening of Assembly ===
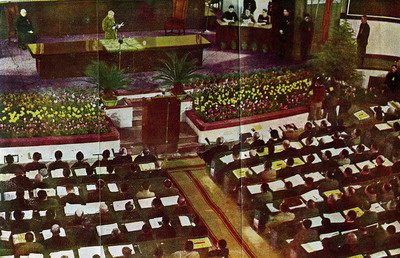
Chiang addressed the Assembly in opening ceremony

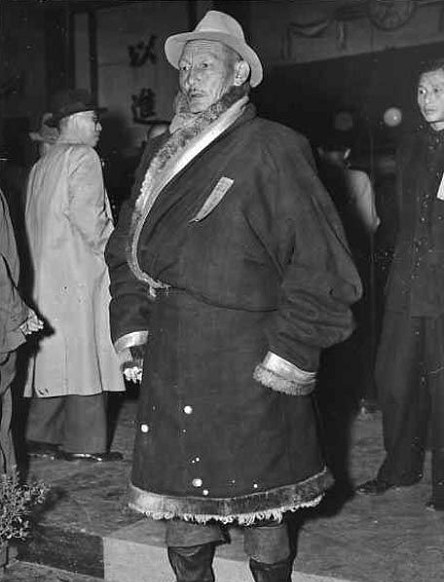
Attending delegate from Tibet area

On 11 October 1946, Chiang Kai-shek, chairman of the Nationalist Government, ordered the convention of the National Assembly, after strategic town Zhangjiakou was captured from the Communists. Originally planned on 12 November, the Assembly was further delayed for three days to await delegation list from Youth and CDSP.

The Assembly opened on 15 November, but then adjourned as CDSP had not submitted the list yet, which only did on 20 November. As the required quorum of 75% was met, the Assembly re-convened without CCP and CDL. In addition to 1936-elected members of mainland China, members from Taiwan joined the meeting as Japanese rule ended in 1945. The Assembly elected the Presidium to rotate the chairmanship, and chose Hung Lan-yu as Secretary-general, Chen Qitian and Lei Chen as vice secretary-general.

The presidium was elected by a total of 1,446 delegates. Some resigned upon election, as indicated by strikethrough, and replaced by italicised supplementary members. Members of the presidium are as follows, with votes received bracketed.

- Chiang Kai-shek (1,371)
- Sun Fo (1,246)
- Bai Chongxi (1,193)
- Yu Youren (1,165)
- Zeng Qi (1,125)
- Hu Shih (1,099)
- Wu Tiecheng (1,053)
- Chen Guofu (1,035)
- Li Huang (1,026)
- Zuo Shunsheng (1,020)
- Cheng Qian (982)
- Serengdongrub (958)
- ~~Wu Yi-fang~~ (953)
- Zou Lu (939)
- Chang Li-sheng (913)
- Paul Yu Pin (905)
- Mo Teh-hui (876)
- Kong Geng (851)
- Ku Cheng-kang (844)
- Chen Qitian (844)
- Li Zongren (841)
- Zhang Qun (830)
- Wu Jingheng (802)
- ~~Chen Cheng~~ (798)
- Thubten? (圖丹桑批; 793)
- ~~Chen Lifu~~ (788)
- Zhu Jingnong (775)
- Ehmetjan Qasim (739)
- Hu Shuhua (720)
- H. H. Kung (706)
- Zhu Jiahua (689)
- Lin Qingnian (林慶年; 681)
- He Chengjun (670)
- Huang Kuo-shu (633)
- Zhang Ji (631)
- Liang Hancao (615)
- Guo Zhongkai (郭仲隗; 614)
- Huang Yunsu (604)
- Zeng Kuoqing (588)
- Duan Xipeng (561)
- Sun Weiru (558)
- Liu Heng-ching (527)
- Wang Yun-wu (520)
- He Zhonghan (436)
- Wang Depu (434)
- Yu Ching-tang (427)
- ~~Shao Lizi~~ (425)
- Ding Weifen (419)
- Tien Chung-chin (408)
- Zhou Yongneng (周雍能; 401)
- Li Daming
- Xu Fulin

==== Party-or-state dispute ====
National flag of Republic of China

Party flag of Kuomintang

Upon entering the National Great Hall, opposition parties including CDSP and Youth requested replacing the party flag of Kuomintang with national flag, arguing the National Assembly is not party congress. The authorities agreed and therefore took off the party flag.

The two parties then declined to take oath of office, claiming the Tridemism references in the oath were incompatible with the ideology of their parties, and insisted the importance of freedom of thought.

=== Deliberation ===
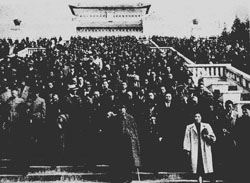
Delegates of National Constituent Assembly

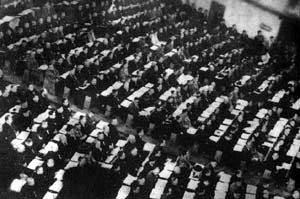
Meeting chamber of National Constituent Assembly

The debate on the constitution draft adopted the three readings procedures. Prior to the first reading, some delegates proposed drafting a new constitution by the Legislative Yuan, instead of following the agreed "Conference Draft". The Assembly later decided to deliberate with "Conference Draft" as the basis after opposition from the minor parties.

On 28 November, Chiang tabled the "Conference Draft" in the Assembly for consideration, starting the first reading. A number of nationalist delegates were resentful as they deemed the draft deviated from Sun's Five-power constitution model, therefore reverted the proposal to "May Fifth Draft" version within a week. Under CDSP's threat of quitting the Assembly, Chiang, also head of Kuomintang, convinced his party colleagues to respect the minor parties. A week later, the draft was reverted to the original version. Most of the amendments were also rejected for breaching the resolution of Political Consultative Conference after the urge from leaders of KMT and CDSP. In total, 104 out of 151 amendments proposed in the first reading were voted down, with 98% of the draft kept from the "Conference Draft". Chiang reaffirmed the hope to establish a parliamentary system in the constitution to shun Communists from attacking the constitution as "fascism" for empowering the executive and presidency.

Second reading began on 21 December immediately after first reading. The draft was gone through clause by clause with details heavily debated. Delegates disputed whether the capital shall be Nanjing or Beijing, eventually resolved with no specific reference in the constitution. It was also argued that Manchu shall enjoy autonomy equal to Mongols and Tibetan, but rejected on basis that Manchu and Han are under one family. Another issue over assigning one-fifth quota to woman in the National Assembly was settled by stipulating that "[the] number of delegates to be elected by women's organizations shall be prescribed by law".

Third reading commenced on 24 December with only minor amendments on the draft. The Constitution of the Republic of China was formally adopted on the other day, along with the implementation timeframe. Both document were handed to Chiang by Wu Jingheng, chairman of the closing ceremony of the National Assembly. The Assembly, and the drafting of the constitution, were thus concluded.

According to the timeline, the constitution shall be promogulated on 1 January 1947 and come into effect on 25 December 1947.

== Aftermath ==
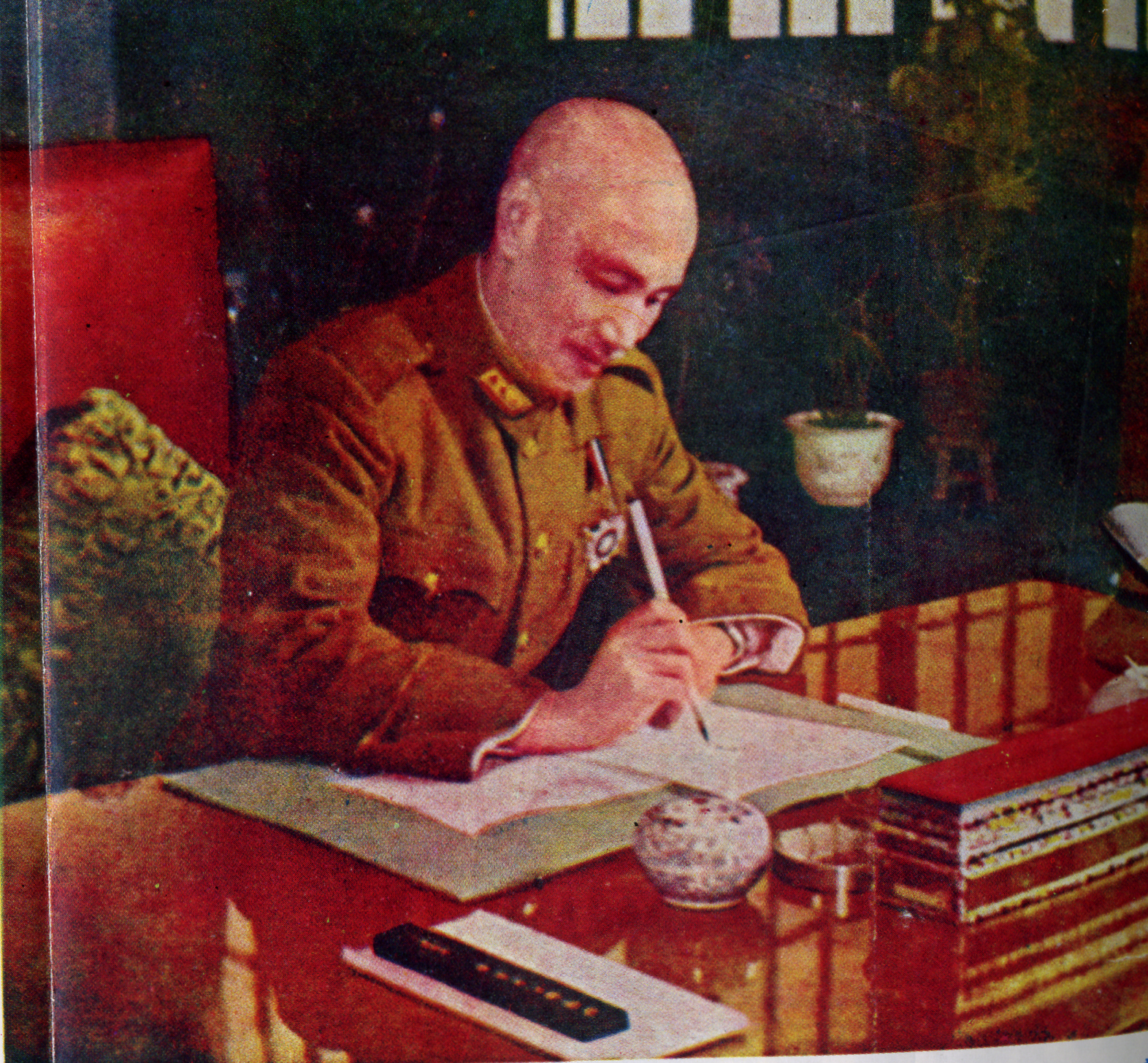
Chiang, chairman of Nationalist Government, signed the Constitution of the Republic of China, marking the start of constitutional government

Following the end of National Constituent Assembly, the Nationalist Government offered an olive branch towards the communists at three occasions in January 1947. CCP insisted on repealing the constitution and restoring to the troop positions as of January 1946 as the fundamental prerequisites to restart negotiations. In June, CCP was officially banned by the Chinese Government, with party leaders including Mao Zedong wanted.

With the Constitution publicized, the government was reformed three months after in line with resolutions of the Political Consultative Conference, ending one-party rule. General election was held in November, with the Constitution finally implemented on 25 December 1947.

The Christmas Day of the thirty-sixth year of the Republic, A.D. Nineteen Forty Seven, will be the starting day of unity, independence, equality, freedom, and new lives of our Republic of China and all of her people. Our new constitution specifically grants personal dignity and freedom, the basic fundamentals of Christianity, to brothers across our nation. This new constitution affirms every freedom and rights of nationals, fostered under unity and freedom of the country and spirit of free people. We believe the implementation of the new constitution is only the first step towards the final target of constructing the new China, but it is still an epic improvement for our China under 3,000-year authoritarianism and feudalism. I wish our brothers across the country will work together forward with faith and devoution.

— Broadcast of chairman of Nationalist Government on 21 December 1947 (translation, excerpt)

The National Assembly, under the new constitution, was convened on 29 March 1948, receiving the power transferred from the Nationalist Government. All five "Yuans" (branches) were convened in May by the President, elected as prescribed by the constitution and the election law, signaling a new stage of constitutionalism. However, due to the outbreak of the civil war, the constitution would be suspended for the next 43 years and the government's seat would later be transferred to Taipei on 7 December 1949 after the Communists took over the mainland; this also led to the imposition of martial law in Taiwan. The original constitution was then reinstated by Lee Teng-hui on 1 May 1991 and has been amended seven times.

== Reaction ==
The Kuomintang believed the National Constituent Assembly cannot be further delayed, citing the urgency to end the party-rule and return power to the people, and the fact that most of the delegates arrived the capital for the Assembly. The Kuomintang further argued the constitution adopted was in line with the principles agreed by all parties including the rebellious Communists, and therefore their objection was unjustifiable.

The Communist Party, on the other hand, claimed Kuomintang was "receiving orders from the United States", and the convocation of the "puppet" National Assembly was breaching the resolutions agreed in the Political Consultative Conference as the government was not reformed in advance. The communists said the National Assembly was to legitimise the civil war and aid by the United States, and that the adopted "fascist" constitution restricted human rights and made the presidency into a dictatorship.

George C. Marshall, the United States Special Envoy, claimed that "[in] fact, the National Assembly has adopted a democratic constitution which in all major aspects is in accordance with the principles laid down by the all-party Political Consultative Conference of last January. It is unfortunate that the Communists did not see fit to participate in the Assembly since the constitution that has been adopted seems to include every major point that they wanted."

== Sources ==
- 孟, 廣涵, ed. (1989). 政治協商會議紀實 (in Chinese (China)). Chongqing: 重慶出版社.
- 荆, 知仁 (1984). 中國立憲史. Taipei: 聯經出版公司.
- 國民大會秘書處 (1946). 國民大會實錄. 國民大會秘書處.
- 蔣, 匀田. 中國近代史轉折點. Hongkong: 友聯出版公司.

== See also ==
- Constitution of the Republic of China
- National Assembly (Republic of China)
- 1947 Chinese National Assembly election
- 1948 Chinese legislative election
- 1948 Chinese presidential election
- Constitution of the People's Republic of China
