= Regions of Taiwan =

The regions of Taiwan are based on historical administrative divisions. However, most of the definitions are not precise.

== Division into two regions ==
- Eastern and Western Taiwan: the Central Mountain Range separates Taiwan into east and west.

- Eastern Taiwan: Yilan, Hualien and Taitung.
- Western Taiwan: other divisions from Taipei to Pingtung.

- Northern and Southern Taiwan: Zhuoshui River, the longest river of Taiwan, flows through about the middle of the island.

- Northern Taiwan: Taipei, New Taipei, Keelung, Taoyuan, Hsinchu (City/County), Miaoli, Taichung, Changhua, and Nantou.
- Southern Taiwan: Yunlin, Chiayi (City/County), Tainan, Kaohsiung, and Pingtung.

== Division into four regions ==
The most widely used definition is from the Council for Economic Planning and Development (經濟建設委員會), Executive Yuan. This division into four regions (tetrachotomy) scheme corresponds to the prefectures under Qing dynasty rule.

No.	1	2	3	4	–
Name	Northern Taiwan	Central Taiwan	Southern Taiwan	Eastern Taiwan	Outlying Islands
Name	北臺灣	中臺灣	南臺灣	東臺灣	外島
Province	Taiwan & 6 Special municipalities				Fujian; Kaohsiung City
Map					
Present divisions	Taipei; New Taipei; Keelung; Taoyuan; Hsinchu City/County; Yilan	Miaoli; Taichung; Changhua; Nantou; Yunlin	Chiayi City/County; Tainan; Kaohsiung; Pingtung; Penghu	Hualien; Taitung	Kinmen; Matsu (Lienchiang); South China Sea Islands (governed by Zhongxing Village, Cijin of Kaohsiung)
Historical Prefectures	Taipeh (臺北府)	Taiwan (臺灣府)	Tainan (臺南府)	Taitung (臺東直隸州)	

== Division into five regions ==
The scheme of division into five regions (pentachotomy) is a fusion of the tetrachotomy and hexachotomy schemes. Although no specific names are given in each division, it is the most commonly used scheme among the highest divisions of the central government. This scheme is used by the Joint Service Centers (JSC, 區域聯合服務中心) under Executive Yuan (行政院) and the jurisdiction of High Court Branches (高等法院分院) under Judicial Yuan (司法院).

No.	Present divisions	Joint Service Center	High Court Branch
1	Taipei, New Taipei, Keelung, Taoyuan, Hsinchu City/County, Yilan	(Headquarter)	Taiwan HC (Headquarter)
2	Miaoli, Taichung, Changhua, Nantou	Central Taiwan JSC	Taiwan HC Taichung BC
3	Yunlin, Chiayi City/County, Tainan	Yunlin-Chiayi-Tainan JSC	Taiwan HC Tainan BC
4	Kaohsiung, Pingtung, Penghu	Southern Taiwan JSC	Taiwan HC Kaohsiung BC
5	Hualien, Taitung	Eastern Taiwan JSC	Taiwan HC Hualien BC
–	Kinmen, Matsu (Lienchiang)	Kinmen-Matsu JSC	Fuchien HC Kinmen BC

== Division into six regions ==
Political division of Taiwan in 1945

The division into six regions (hexachotomy) scheme corresponds to the prefectures under Japanese rule. This scheme was used for national electoral districts in the legislative elections in 1972, 1975, 1980, 1983, and 1986. The discussion of this scheme became popular after the elections of five new municipalities in 2010.

No.	Name		Present divisions	Historical Prefectures	
1	Pei–Pei–Kee–(Yi)	北北基(宜)	Taipei, New Taipei, Keelung, (Yilan)	Taihoku	臺北州
2	Tao-Chu-Miao	桃竹苗	Taoyuan, Hsinchu City/County, Miaoli	Shinchiku	新竹州
3	Chung–Chang–Tou	中彰投	Taichung, Changhua, Nantou	Taichū	臺中州
4	Yun–Chia–Nan	雲嘉南	Yunlin, Chiayi City/County, Tainan	Tainan	臺南州
5	Kao–Ping(–Peng)	高屏(澎)	Kaohsiung, Pingtung, (Penghu)	Takao, Hōko	高雄州、澎湖廳
6	(Yi–)Hua–Tung	(宜)花東	(Yilan), Hualien, Taitung	Karenkō, Taitō	花蓮港廳、臺東廳
–	(Peng–)Kin–Ma	(澎)金馬	(Penghu), Kinmen, Matsu (Lienchiang)	None	

== See also ==
- Administrative divisions of Taiwan
- Geography of Taiwan
- North–South divide in Taiwan
- Political divisions of Taiwan (1895–1945)
