= Young China Association =

Nationalist youth organization in China (1918–1925)

Young China Association (Chinese: 少年中國學會; pinyin: Shàonián Zhōngguó Xuéhuì) was a nationalist youth organization active in Republican China from 1918 to 1925. Formed amid foreign imperialism and the intellectual currents of the New Culture Movement, it modeled itself on Giuseppe Mazzini's Young Italy and sought to foster national consciousness through cultural and educational initiatives.

== History ==
Founded by young intellectuals including Wang Guangqi, Zhou Taixuan, Chen Yusheng, Zhang Mengjiu, Zeng Qi, Lei Meisheng, and Li Dazhao, the Association built networks across Chinese cities, overseas Chinese communities in Southeast Asia, and student circles in France. Its journal Young China, introduced Western political and literary ideas, promoted cultural patriotism, and often critiqued organized religion as part of broader social modernization, and often critiqued organized religion as part of broader social modernization.

By 1925, the Association had largely dissolved. Its members followed diverse political paths: some joined the Chinese Communist Party, others found the Young China Party, while many remained independent or entered other reformist and professional networks.

== Factions and membership ==
=== Statists ===
They later founded the YCP.

- Zeng Qi
- Li Huang
- Zuo Shunsheng (左舜生)
- Chen Qitian (陳啟天)
- Yu Jiaju

=== Communists ===
Individuals in this grouping either joined or sympathized with the Communist movement; many later played prominent roles in the Chinese Communist Party.

- Li Dazhao
- Zhang Wentian
- Mao Zedong
- Deng Zhongxia
- Yun Daiying

=== Social reformers ===
This tendency prioritized cultural and social reforms (education, publishing, and social work) while avoiding direct partisan politics.

- Wang Guangqi
- Zhou Taixuan
