= Yu Jiaju =

Chinese educator and activist

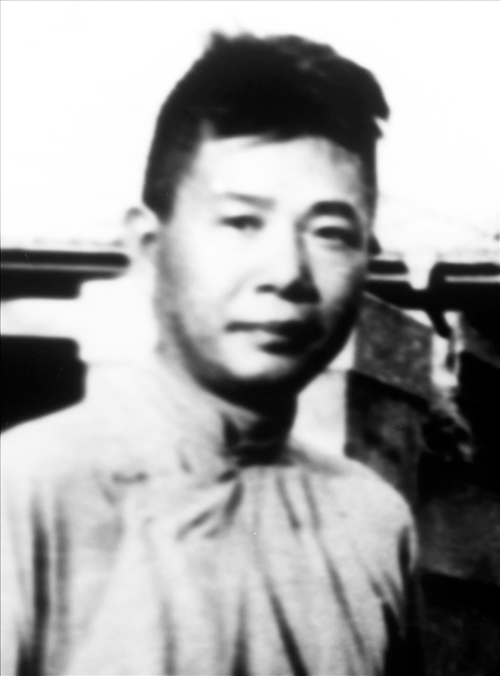
Yu Jiaju

Yu Jiaju (Chinese: 余家菊; pinyin: Yú Jiājú; Wade–Giles: Yü Chia-chü; 9 April 1898 - 12 May 1976) was a Chinese educator, social advocate and the co-founder of the Young China Party.

== Biography ==
Yu was born to a scholarly family in Huangpi County, Hubei, Republic of China. He studied education at Beijing Normal University, and was later funded by the Chinese Ministry of Education to study in the UK, first in the University of London before transferring to the University of Edinburgh. He returned to China in 1924 to serve as head of the Department of Education at Wuchang University. In 1937, he became the head of the Department of Education at Henan University.

Yu was a member of the Young China Association and was instrumental in the 1920s Educational Rights Movement. He particularly attacked Christian educational institutions as impinging on Chinese nationalism.

Yu Chuan-tao, Yu's son, is a biochemist who later served as Deputy Minister of Education and President of National Central University. Yu Chuan-tao married Chen Hsing, daughter of Vice President Chen Cheng.

After 1949, Yu moved to Taiwan and died there on May 12, 1976.
