= China Democratic Socialist Party =

China Democratic Socialist Party 中國民主社會黨
- Founder: Carsun Chang
- Founded: 15 August 1946
- Dissolved: 29 April 2020
- Merger of: Chinese State Socialist Party; Democratic Constitutionalist Party
- Ideology: Democratic socialism Social democracy Chinese nationalism 1949–1987: Anti-communism; Conservatism; Neo-Confucianism

Party flag

The China Democratic Socialist Party (CDSP; Chinese: 中國民主社會黨; pinyin: Zhōngguó mínzhǔ shèhuìdǎng) was a Chinese political party founded in Shanghai on 14 August 1946. It was formed through the merger of the former Chinese State Socialist Party (Chinese: 中國國家社會黨) and the Democratic Constitutionalist Party (Chinese: 民主憲政黨). The inaugural leader of the party was Carsun Chang. Along with the Kuomintang, the Young China Party and China Democratic League, it was one of the longest active political parties in both Nationalist China and in post-civil war rump Republic of China in Taiwan.

== Ideology ==
The CDSP's platform was to promote democratic socialism in China, world peace, individual freedoms, economic development, a narrowing of the gap between rich and poor, and equal rights for women. The party also sought the implementation of a social welfare system for public health and social security.

Despite this, the party can also be described as Neo-Confucianist, as its founder Carsun Chang argued for incorporating reformist Confucian elements to create a humane, just society, combining traditional values with democratic socialism.

== History ==
Both the Socialists and the Democratic Constitutionalists had strong ties to Liang Qichao's defunct Progressive Party. The former were based in China as part of the China Democratic League while the latter was made up of overseas Chinese and expatriates. Most of their members were middle-age to elderly. They never actively recruited and most of their members were friends or relatives of each other. Their small numbers meant they lacked influence but also allowed them to operate under the radar of the Kuomintang and prevent infiltration by other parties.

After the promulgation of the Republic of China's constitution in January 1947, the CDSP established branches in several provinces and cities around China and participated in the first elections to the National Assembly, Legislative Yuan and Control Yuan. The party also postulated Hsu Fu-lin as candidate for vice-president in the First National Assembly of 1948 in Nanking.

After the ROC Government's retreat from mainland China, key members, including elected representatives and party leaders, followed the Kuomintang to Taiwan. Carsun Chang moved to the United States and was replaced as party head by Hsu Fu-lin until Hsu's death in 1958. Chang was elected party chairman by a national congress of the CDSP held in 1959.

The CDSP, along with the Young China Party, was one of two authorized opposition parties in the Republic of China during the imposition of Martial Law by the ruling Kuomintang. The party held a small number of seats in the National Assembly, Legislative Yuan and Control Yuan, and was regarded as having little influence. The party failed to gain elected representation after Taiwan's democratic transition in the 1990s.

On 29 April 2020, the party was disbanded by the Ministry of the Interior due to a failure to re-register after changes in the law regarding political parties.

== Electoral performances ==
The party did not contest in elections after 1992.

=== Presidential elections ===
Election	Candidate	Running mate	Total votes	Share of votes	Outcome
1954	Hsu Fu-lin	Shih Chih-chuan	48	3.09%	Defeated

=== Legislative elections ===
Election	Total seats won	Total votes	Share of votes	Changes	Status
1948	17 / 759	?	?		Minority
1969	0 / 11	did not contest			Minority
1972	0 / 51	did not contest			Minority
1975	0 / 52	did not contest			Minority
1980	0 / 97	5,816	0.09%		Minority
1983	1 / 98	2,154	0.03%		Minority
1986	1 / 100	?	?		Minority
1989	0 / 130	?	?		Minority
1992	0 / 161	418	0.00%		Minority

=== National Assembly elections ===
Election	Total seats won	Total votes	Share of votes	Changes	Status
1947	68 / 3,045	?	?		Minority
1969	0 / 84	?	?		Minority
1972	0 / 53	?	?		Minority
1980	1 / 76	?	?		Minority
1986	1 / 84	?	?		Minority
1991	0 / 130	1,125	0.01%		Minority

== See also ==
- Democratic Socialist Party (Japan)
