= Li Huang (disambiguation) =

Li Huang (1895–1991) was a Chinese politician and educator.

Li Huang may also refer to following other individuals of which name in Chinese character can be transliterated to Hanyu Pinyin:

- 黎煌 (Lí Huáng; born 1956), Vietnamese film director and screenwriter
- 李滉 (Lǐ Huǎng; 1501–1570), Korean philosopher
- 李晄 (Lǐ Huǎng; 1450–1470), the eighth monarch of the Joseon dynasty of Korea
