= CDSP =

CDSP may refer to:

- China Democratic Socialist Party, a former political party in China
- Church Divinity School of the Pacific, a seminary in the United States
