= Liu Heng-ching =

Chinese politician

- 劉蘅靜
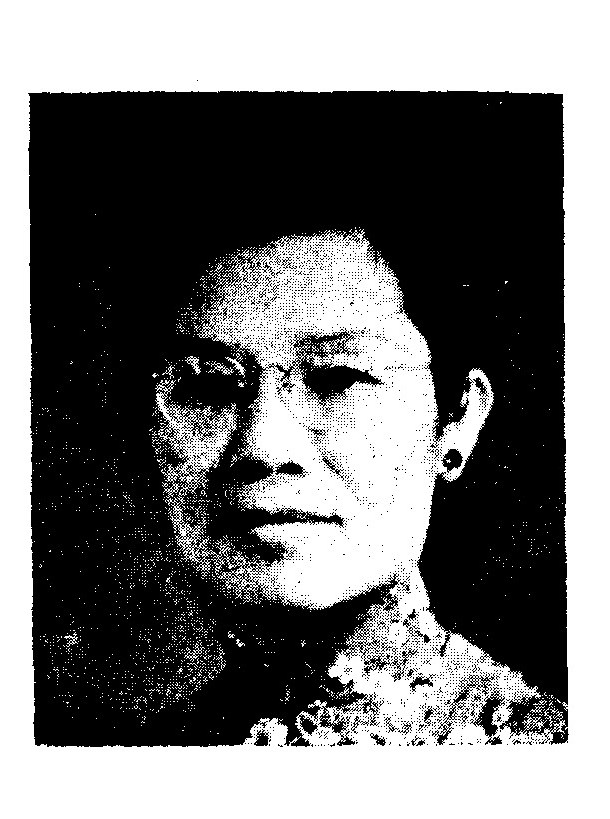

Member of the Legislative Yuan
- In office 1948–1979
- Constituency: Nanjing

Personal details
- Born: 8 March 1900
- Died: 8 August 1979 (aged 79)

Liu Heng-ching (Chinese: 劉蘅靜, 8 March 1900 – 8 August 1979) was a Chinese politician. She was among the first group of women elected to the Legislative Yuan in 1948.

== Biography ==
Originally from Panyu County, Liu graduated from Peking Normal Women's University, after which she carried out research at the Teacher's College of Columbia University in the United States. Returning to China, she worked as headmistress of Jiangsu Provincial Nanjing Girls' High School and taught at Chongqing Private Rural Construction College.

Liu became a member of the Kuomintang and served on its central supervisory committee. In the 1948 elections to the Legislative Yuan, she ran as a Kuomintang candidate in Nanjing and was elected to parliament. She relocated to Taiwan during the Chinese Civil War, where she remained a member of the Legislative Yuan until her death in 1979.
