= 1989 Taiwanese legislative election =

- 2 December 1989

All 130 seats in the Legislative Yuan 65 seats needed for a majority
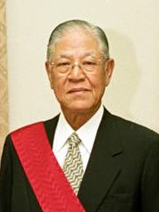

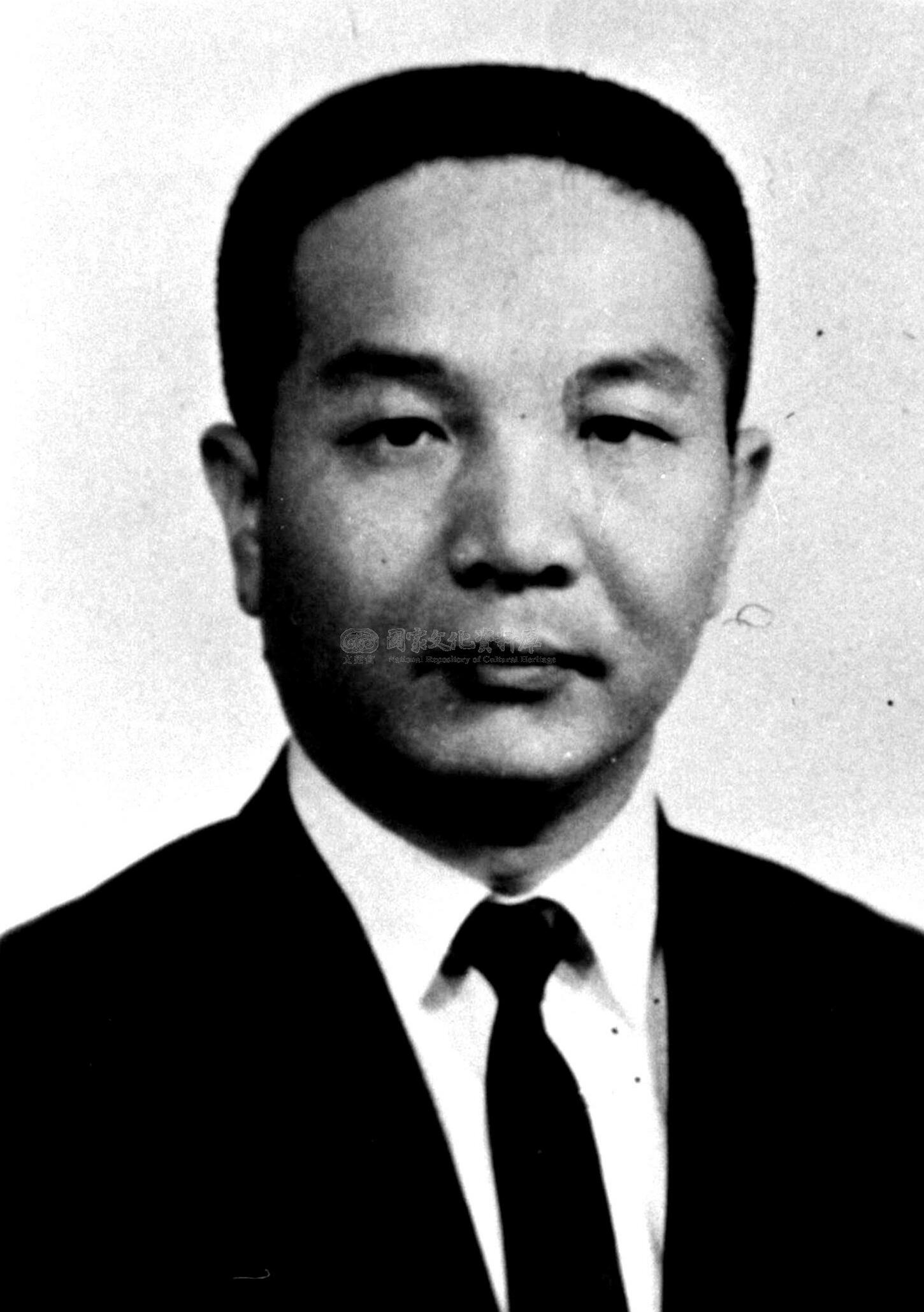

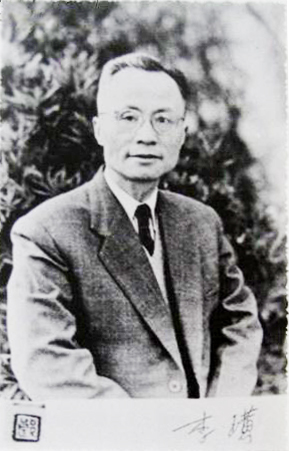
	Majority party	Minority party	Third party
Leader	Lee Teng-hui	Huang Hsin-chieh	Li Huang
Party	KMT	DPP	Youth
Alliance	Pan-Blue	Pan-Green	—
Seats before	83	12	2
Seats won	94	21	1
Seat change	▲11	▲9	▼1

Legislative elections were held in Taiwan on 2 December 1989 to elect members of the Legislative Yuan.

== Background ==
Compared with the sixth supplementary election the number of new delegates to the Legislative Yuan had been increased from 100 to 130. Of these, 101 were to be elected directly representing Taiwan Province and the special municipalities of Taipei City and Kaohsiung City. The remaining 29 seats were to represent overseas nationals, these delegates were appointed by the President.

== Results ==
Turnout for the supplementary election was 75.5%. Of the 101 directly elected delegates, 72 belonged to the Kuomintang, 21 to Democratic Progressive Party and 8 were independents.

By virtue of achieving more than 20 seats, the Democratic Progressive Party secured the prerogative to propose legislation in the Legislative Yuan.

Party	Votes	%	Seats	+/–
Kuomintang			94	+11
Democratic Progressive Party			21	+9
Chinese Youth Party			1	–1
Independents			14	+8
Total			130	+30
Valid votes	9,115,778	96.25		
Invalid/blank votes	354,748	3.75		
Total votes	9,470,526	100.00		
Registered voters/turnout	12,600,901	75.16		
Source: Nohlen et al.

== See also ==
- History of Taiwan (1945–present)#Democratic reforms
- Politics of the Republic of China
- List of political parties in Taiwan
- Political status of Taiwan
