= 1991 Taiwanese National Assembly election =

National Assembly elections were held in the Republic of China on 22 December 1991. The result was a victory for the Kuomintang, which won 254 of the 325 seats. Voter turnout was 68.3%.

== Results ==
Election results.

Party	Votes	%	Seats	+/–
Kuomintang	6,053,366	69.11	254	+186
Democratic Progressive Party	2,036,271	23.25	66	New
Democratic Non-Partisan Alliance	193,234	2.21	3	New
Chinese Social Democratic Party	185,515	2.12	0	New
Labor Party	18,008	0.21	0	New
Workers' Party	7,698	0.09	0	New
Farmers' Party	4,268	0.05	0	New
Chinese Youth Party	1,573	0.02	0	New
China Renaissance Party	1,189	0.01	0	New
China Democratic Socialist Party	1,125	0.01	0	–1
China Old Veterans Unification Party	910	0.01	0	New
China Democratic Constitutional Party	695	0.01	0	New
China Neutral Party	576	0.01	0	New
China All People Welfare Party	530	0.01	0	New
National Revival Party	430	0.00	0	New
China Justice Party	276	0.00	0	New
China Great Harmony Democratic Party	183	0.00	0	New
Independents	253,032	2.89	2	–13
Total	8,758,879	100.00	325	+241
Valid votes	8,758,879	97.99		
Invalid/blank votes	179,743	2.01		
Total votes	8,938,622	100.00		
Registered voters/turnout	13,083,119	68.32		
Source: Nohlen et al.
