= 1992 Taiwanese legislative election =

- 19 December 1992

All 162 seats in the Legislative Yuan 82 seats needed for a majority
- Turnout: 72.02%
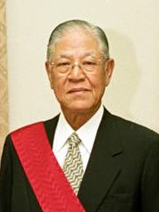

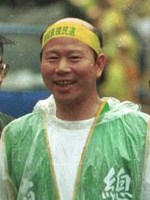
	Majority party	Minority party
Leader	Lee Teng-hui	Hsu Hsin-liang
Party	KMT	DPP
Seats won	102	51
Seat change	▲1	▲30
Popular vote	5,030,725	2,944,195
Percentage	53.02%	31.03%

- Elected member party by seat: Kuomintang; Democratic Progressive Party; Independent
President before election
Liang Su-yung
KMT
Elected President
Liu Sung-pan
KMT

Legislative elections were held in Taiwan on 19 December 1992.

== Background ==
The Constitution of the Republic of China took effect on December 25, 1947 (36th year of the Republic) and held its first parliamentary election in 1948. Amidst the backdrop of the Chinese Civil War between the Kuomintang nationalist government and the Chinese Communist Party, the National Assembly invoked article 174 of the constitution and implemented the Temporary Provisions against the Communist Rebellion. After the mainland fell to the Communists, the central government retreated to Taiwan thus holding another nationwide elections would be too difficult in the Communist-held areas.

As democratization began in the late 1980s, the government repealed the Temporary Provisions and introduced the Additional Articles of the Constitution of the Republic of China, allowing the electorates residing in the free area to directly elect the president and the complete re-election of the Legislative Yuan.

The result was a victory for the KMT, which won 95 of the 161 seats. Voter turnout was 72.0%.

== Results ==
Party	Votes	%	Seats	+/–
Kuomintang	5,030,725	53.02	95	+1
Democratic Progressive Party	2,944,195	31.03	51	+30
Chinese Social Democratic Party	126,213	1.33	1	New
Workers' Party	32,349	0.34	0	New
Labor Party	11,224	0.12	0	New
Truth Party	6,545	0.07	0	New
China Unity Party	1,438	0.02	0	New
People's Action Party	1,221	0.01	0	New
Chinese Youth Party	1,035	0.01	0	–1
National Revival Party	886	0.01	0	New
China All People Welfare Party	677	0.01	0	New
China Democratic Socialist Party	418	0.00	0	New
China Great Harmony Democratic Party	201	0.00	0	New
China Justice Party	90	0.00	0	New
Independents	1,331,555	14.03	14	0
Total	9,488,772	100.00	161	+31
Valid votes	9,488,772	98.17		
Invalid/blank votes	177,249	1.83		
Total votes	9,666,021	100.00		
Registered voters/turnout	13,421,170	72.02		
Source: Nohlen et al.
