= 1996 Taiwanese National Assembly election =

National Assembly elections were held in the Republic of China on 23 March 1996, the first direct presidential election was also held on the same day. The result was a victory for the Kuomintang, which won 183 of the 334 seats. Voter turnout was 76.2%.

== Results ==
Popular vote of each district

Party	Votes	%	Seats	+/–
Kuomintang	5,180,829	49.68	183	–71
Democratic Progressive Party	3,121,423	29.93	99	+33
New Party	1,417,209	13.59	46	New
Green Party Taiwan	113,942	1.09	0	New
Taiwan Indigenous Party	7,458	0.07	0	New
Chinese Youth Party	6,197	0.06	0	0
Labor Party	4,340	0.04	0	0
Modern Progressive Party	4,029	0.04	0	New
Independents	572,961	5.49	6	+4
Total	10,428,388	100.00	334	+9
Valid votes	10,428,388	96.84		
Invalid/blank votes	340,836	3.16		
Total votes	10,769,224	100.00		
Registered voters/turnout	14,130,084	76.21		
Source: Nohlen et al.
