= 1983 Taiwanese legislative election =

The fifth supplementary elections for the Legislative Yuan were held in the Republic of China (Taiwan) on 3 December 1983.

Compared with the fourth supplementary election the number of new delegates to the Legislative Yuan had been increased by one from 97 to 98 due to an increase in population. Of these, 71 represented Taiwan Province and the special municipalities of Taipei and Kaohsiung and were elected directly. The remaining 27 seats represented overseas nationals and were appointed by the President. Due to attrition, the number of delegates in the Legislative Yuan originally elected in 1948 had reduced from 760 to 274, with an average age of 77.

Turnout for the supplementary election was 63.2%. Of the 71 directly elected delegates, 62 belonged to the Kuomintang and 9 were independents. Of the independents, six belonged to the Tangwai. All chosen were born Taiwanese, except for five who were born on the Mainland or from parents from the Mainland.

== Results ==
Party	Votes	%	Seats	+/–
Kuomintang			83	+4
Chinese Youth Party			2	0
China Democratic Socialist Party			1	New
Independents			12	–4
Total			98	+1
Valid votes	6,741,873	97.84		
Invalid/blank votes	148,796	2.16		
Total votes	6,890,669	100.00		
Registered voters/turnout	10,908,171	63.17		
Source: Nohlen et al.
