= 1986 Taiwanese legislative election =

The sixth supplementary elections for the National Assembly and Legislative Yuan were held in Taiwan on 6 December 1986.

== Background ==
Compared with the last supplementary election (1980 for the National Assembly and 1983 for the Legislative Yuan respectively) the number of eligible seats for the National Assembly had been increased from 76 to 84 and for the Legislative Yuan from 98 to 100 due to an increase in population. Of these, 73 seats for the Legislative Yuan represented Taiwan Province and the special municipalities of Taipei and Kaohsiung and were to be elected directly. The remaining 27 seats for the Legislative Yuan represented overseas nationals and were appointed by the President.

== Results ==
Turnout for the supplementary election of the National Assembly was 65.1% and for the Legislative Yuan 65.4%. Of the newly elected members to the National Assembly 68 belonged to the Kuomintang, 11 to the Democratic Progressive Party (running as independents), one to the Chinese Youth Party and four were independents. Of the 73 directly elected delegates to the Legislative Yuan 59 belonged to the Kuomintang, 12 to Democratic Progressive Party (running as independents) and two were independent. All chosen were born Taiwanese except for 8 in the National Assembly and 3 in the Legislative Yuan, who were born on the Mainland or from parents from the Mainland.

This was the first time the Democratic Progressive Party organized much of the Tangwai forces into a political party and contested in elections as such, defying the Kuomintang government's ban on the formation of new political parties under the Temporary Provisions Effective During the Period of Communist Rebellion.

=== Legislative Yuan ===
Party	Votes	%	Seats	+/–
Kuomintang			79	–4
Democratic Progressive Party (Note: Running as independents)			12	New
Chinese Youth Party			2	0
China Democratic Socialist Party			1	0
Independents			6	–6
Total			100	+2
Valid votes	7,515,747	97.32		
Invalid/blank votes	207,266	2.68		
Total votes	7,723,013	100.00		
Registered voters/turnout	11,814,315	65.37		
Source: Nohlen et al., People News

=== National Assembly ===
Party	Votes	%	Seats	+/–
Kuomintang			68	+7
Democratic Progressive Party			11	New
China Democratic Socialist Party			1	0
Independents			4	–10
Total			84	+8
Valid votes	7,422,398	96.21		
Invalid/blank votes	291,994	3.79		
Total votes	7,714,392	100.00		
Registered voters/turnout	11,790,344	65.43		
Source: Nohlen et al., People News
