= 1980 Taiwanese legislative election =

The fourth supplementary elections for the National Assembly and Legislative Yuan were held in Taiwan on 6 December 1980.

== Background ==
Originally these elections were scheduled for December 1978. They were postponed after the United States terminated diplomatic relations with the Republic of China just days before the elections were planned. They were subsequently held in December 1980. President Chiang Ching-kuo made agreements with Tangwai leaders and other independent politicians so they could compete for seats with Kuomintang candidates. These elections were the first competitive elections for Taiwan on a national level.

Compared with the last supplementary elections in 1972 for the National Assembly and 1975 for the Legislative Yuan, the number of eligible seats for the National Assembly increased from 53 to 76 and for the Legislative Yuan from 52 to 97. Of these, 70 seats representing Taiwan Province and the special municipalities of Taipei and Kaohsiung were to be elected directly. The remaining 27 seats representing overseas nationals were chosen by the President.

== Results ==
Turnout for both the supplementary elections of the National Assembly and the Legislative Yuan was 66,4%. Of the newly elected members to the National Assembly, 61 belonged to the Kuomintang, one to 1 the Chinese Youth Party and 14 were independents. Of the 70 directly elected delegates to the Legislative Yuan, 56 belonged to the Kuomintang and 14 were independents. Of these independents 9 could be counted as belonging to the Tangwai movement. All chosen were born Taiwanese except for 14 (7 in each of the legislative bodies) who were born on the Mainland or from parents from the Mainland.

=== Legislative Yuan ===
Party	Votes	%	Seats	+/–
Kuomintang	4,721,301	74.07	56	+14
Chinese Youth Party	57,919	0.91	0	–1
China Democratic Socialist Party	5,816	0.09	0	New
Independents	1,588,721	24.93	14	+5
Total	6,373,757	100.00	70	+18
Valid votes	6,373,757	96.80		
Invalid/blank votes	210,581	3.20		
Total votes	6,584,338	100.00		
Registered voters/turnout	9,921,965	66.36		
Source: Executive Yuan, Dong

==== By constituency ====
Constituency	Seats	Electorate	Turnout	%	Party	Votes	%	Seats won
Taipei City	8	1,168,405	758,113	64.88	Kuomintang	520,579	70.18	6
Taipei City	8	1,168,405	758,113	64.88	Chinese Youth Party	12,044	1.62	0
Taipei City	8	1,168,405	758,113	64.88	China Democratic Socialist Party	1,044	0.14	0
Taipei City	8	1,168,405	758,113	64.88	Independents	208,102	28.06	2
Kaohsiung City	5	571,795	386,320	67.56	Kuomintang	245,577	64.94	4
Kaohsiung City	5	571,795	386,320	67.56	Independents	132,605	35.06	1
Taiwan I	8	1,437,965	894,745	62.22	Kuomintang	608,496	69.89	5
Taiwan I	8	1,437,965	894,745	62.22	Independents	262,239	30.11	3
Taiwan II	6	1,072,170	743,124	69.31	Kuomintang	549,119	76.22	5
Taiwan II	6	1,072,170	743,124	69.31	Chinese Youth Party	9,338	1.30	0
Taiwan II	6	1,072,170	743,124	69.31	Independents	162,009	22.48	1
Taiwan III	9	1,586,509	1,081,325	68.16	Kuomintang	800,669	76.66	8
Taiwan III	9	1,586,509	1,081,325	68.16	Chinese Youth Party	7,455	0.71	0
Taiwan III	9	1,586,509	1,081,325	68.16	Independents	236,263	22.63	1
Taiwan IV	8	1,547,649	955,259	61.72	Kuomintang	603,115	65.24	6
Taiwan IV	8	1,547,649	955,259	61.72	Chinese Youth Party	6,764	0.73	0
Taiwan IV	8	1,547,649	955,259	61.72	Independents	314,509	34.03	2
Taiwan V	5	906,545	607,543	67.02	Kuomintang	468,368	79.62	4
Taiwan V	5	906,545	607,543	67.02	Independents	119,917	20.38	1
Taiwan VI	2	233,791	146,302	62.59	Kuomintang	112,469	79.47	2
Taiwan VI	2	233,791	146,302	62.59	China Democratic Socialist Party	4,772	3.37	0
Taiwan VI	2	233,791	146,302	62.59	Independents	24,278	17.16	0
Fujian	1	20,460	19,384	94.74	Kuomintang	19,228	100	1
Highland Aborigine	1	82,247	60,414	73.45	Kuomintang	58,803	100	1
Lowland Aborigine	1	66,570	42,752	64.22	Kuomintang	40,635	100	1
Farmers	4				Kuomintang	232,595	79.71	4
Farmers	4				Chinese Youth Party	19,057	6.53	0
Farmers	4				Independents	40,150	13.76	0
Fishermen	2				Kuomintang	72,640	100	2
Workers	4				Kuomintang	249,679	73.28	3
Workers	4				Chinese Youth Party	3,261	0.96	0
Workers	4				Independents	87,794	25.76	1
Industrial group	2				Kuomintang	20,947	100	2
Business group	2				Kuomintang	69,364	100	2
Education group	2				Kuomintang	49,018	98.29	2
Education group	2				Independents	855	1.71	0
Source: Dong

=== National Assembly ===
Party	Votes	%	Seats	+/–
Kuomintang			61	+18
China Democratic Socialist Party			1	New
Independents			14	+4
Total			76	+23
Valid votes	6,333,065	96.38		
Invalid/blank votes	237,782	3.62		
Total votes	6,570,847	100.00		
Registered voters/turnout	9,891,068	66.43		
Source: Nohlen et al.
