= 1975 Taiwanese legislative election =

The third supplementary elections for the Legislative Yuan were held in the Republic of China (Taiwan) on 20 December 1975.

Compared with the second supplementary election the number of new delegates to the Legislative Yuan had been increased by one to 52, because of an increase in population. Of these, 37 were to be elected directly to represent Taiwan Province and the special municipality of Taipei. The remaining 15 seats were to represent overseas nationals and were appointed by the President.

Turnout for the supplementary election of the Legislative Yuan was 75.97% of 8,410,775 eligible votes. Of the 37 elected delegates, 30 belonged to the Kuomintang, one belonged to the Chinese Youth Party, and 6 were independent. All members chosen were born on Taiwan except for 5 delegates, who (or their parents) were from the Mainland.

== Results ==
Party	Votes	%	Seats	+/–
Kuomintang	4,942,461	79.46	42	+1
Chinese Youth Party	143,992	2.31	1	0
Independents	1,133,981	18.23	9	0
Total	6,220,434	100.00	52	+1
Valid votes	6,220,434	97.36		
Invalid/blank votes	168,877	2.64		
Total votes	6,389,311	100.00		
Registered voters/turnout	8,410,775	75.97		
Source: Executive Yuan, Dong

=== By constituency ===
Constituency	Seats	Electorate	Turnout	%	Party	Votes	%	Seats won
Taipei City	5	1,013,279	578,989	57.14	Kuomintang	356,809	63.01	3
Taipei City	5	1,013,279	578,989	57.14	Independents	209,359	36.99	2
Taiwan I	3	1,077,411	768,463	71.32	Kuomintang	305,936	41.41	2
Taiwan I	3	1,077,411	768,463	71.32	Chinese Youth Party	143,992	19.49	1
Taiwan I	3	1,077,411	768,463	71.32	Independents	288,871	39.1	0
Taiwan II	3	903,559	823,355	91.12	Kuomintang	809,367	100	3
Taiwan III	5	1,404,152	1,108,684	78.96	Kuomintang	951,533	88.05	4
Taiwan III	5	1,404,152	1,108,684	78.96	Independents	129,035	11.95	1
Taiwan IV	5	1,442,204	1,104,955	76.62	Kuomintang	914,456	84.91	4
Taiwan IV	5	1,442,204	1,104,955	76.62	Independents	162,468	15.09	1
Taiwan V	4	1,256,684	929,583	73.97	Kuomintang	693,413	89.28	4
Taiwan V	4	1,256,684	929,583	73.97	Independents	213,332	10.72	0
Taiwan VI	1	229,718	187,358	81.56	Kuomintang	155,174	84.99	1
Taiwan VI	1	229,718	187,358	81.56	Independents	27,409	15.01	0
Fujian	1	30,307	29,744	98.14	Kuomintang	29,436	100	1
Highland Aborigine	1	124,896	114,017	91.29	Kuomintang	112,590	100	1
Farmers	2	329,169	299,322	90.93	Kuomintang	288,188	100	2
Fishermen	1	81,829	61,982	75.75	Kuomintang	60,716	100	1
Workers	2	367,088	266,996	72.73	Kuomintang	173,142	68.00	1
Workers	2	367,088	266,996	72.73	Independents	81,480	32.00	1
Industrial group	1	21,221	13,627	64.21	Kuomintang	12,766	100	1
Business group	1	87,403	66,751	76.37	Kuomintang	46,634	73.24	1
Business group	1	87,403	66,751	76.37	Independents	17,038	26.76	0
Education group	1	41,855	38,437	88.71	Kuomintang	32,301	86.99	1
Education group	1	41,855	38,437	88.71	Independents	4,829	13.01	0
Source: Dong
