= 1969 Taiwanese legislative election =

The first supplementary elections took place for the National Assembly and the Legislative Yuan in the Republic of China on 20 December 1969. Voter turnout was 54.7% and 55.0% respectively.

== Background ==
Between 1949 and 1969 both bodies were composed almost exclusively of delegates elected in 1947 and 1948, when the Government was on the Mainland. After moving to Taiwan the elected position of the representatives of provinces on the mainland in both the National Assembly and the Legislative Yuan was retained under the Temporary Provisions against the Communist Rebellion. However the number of delegates began to decline because of old age and attrition. In March 1966 the National Assembly approved regulations to make possible the replacement of retired members by elected members rather than leave the seats vacant or appoint members who had run in the 1948 election unsuccessfully. On 1 July 1969 the President announced a direct election was to be held for 15 new members to the National Assembly and 11 to the Legislative Yuan, all representing Taiwan Province and the special municipality of Taipei.

== Results ==
All 15 newly elected members of the National Assembly belonged to the Kuomintang. Of the 11 newly elected members of the Legislative Yuan eight belonged to the Kuomintang and three were independent. All elected were born Taiwanese.

The newly elected delegates comprised only about one percent and three percent of the National Assembly and the Legislative Yuan respectively. Still, on the assumption the island was part of China, the election gave Taiwan a greater representation in these legislative organs than was constitutionally justified by its population.

The result of Districts

=== Legislative Yuan ===
Party	Votes	%	Seats
Kuomintang	2,675,910	76.00	8
Chinese Youth Party	111,187	3.16	0
Independents	733,685	20.84	3
Total	3,520,782	100.00	11
Valid votes	3,520,782	95.61	
Invalid/blank votes	161,575	4.39	
Total votes	3,682,357	100.00	
Registered voters/turnout	6,694,978	55.00	
Source: Nohlen et al., Taiwan Provincial Government

==== By constituency ====
Constituency	Seats	Electorate	Turnout	%	Party	Votes	%	Seats won
Taipei City	4	891,351	388,359	43.57	Kuomintang	166,901	44.61	2
Taipei City	4	891,351	388,359	43.57	Chinese Youth Party	8,094	2.16	0
Taipei City	4	891,351	388,359	43.57	Independents	199,119	53.23	2
Taiwan I	3	2,495,227	1,442,617	57.82	Kuomintang	1,263,332	90.75	3
Taiwan I	3	2,495,227	1,442,617	57.82	Independents	128,796	9.25	0
Taiwan II	4	3,308,400	1,851,381	55.96	Kuomintang	1,245,677	71.00	3
Taiwan II	4	3,308,400	1,851,381	55.96	Chinese Youth Party	103,093	5.88	0
Taiwan II	4	3,308,400	1,851,381	55.96	Independents	405,765	23.12	1

=== National Assembly ===
Party	Votes	%	Seats
Kuomintang			15
Total			15
Valid votes	1,726,645	94.90	
Invalid/blank votes	92,757	5.10	
Total votes	1,819,402	100.00	
Registered voters/turnout	3,325,203	54.72	
Source: Nohlen et al.
