= 1948 Chinese legislative election =

Held in China between 21 and 23 January 1948

- 21–23 January 1948

759 seats to the Legislative Yuan
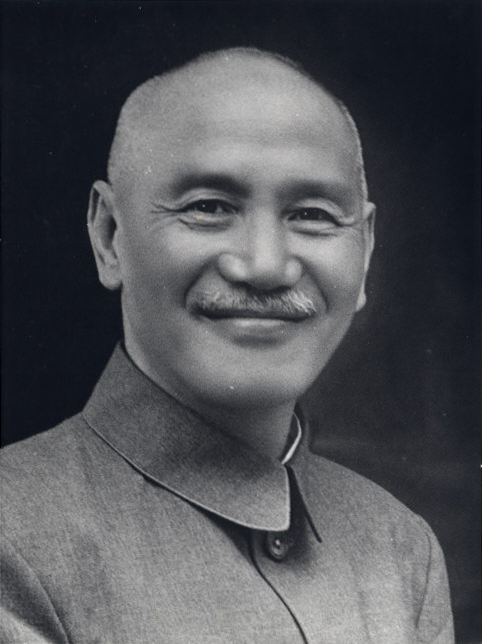

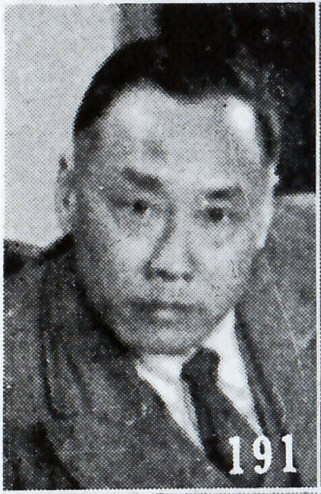

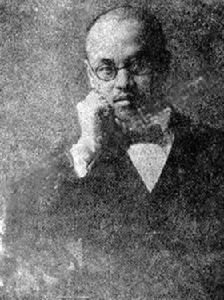
	Majority party	Minority party	Third party
Leader	Chiang Kai-shek	Carsun Chang	Tseng Chi
Party	KMT	Democratic Socialist	Youth
Seats won	716	17	6

The 1st Legislative Yuan election was held in China between 21 and 23 January 1948. This election, and the preceding 1947 National Assembly election are the first elections of under the newly ratified 1947 Constitution of the Republic of China. Under this constitution, the Legislative Yuan is a standing legislature when the National Assembly is not in session. At the time most of Chinese territory was under the control of the government of the Republic of China, using a direct voting system elected 759 Legislative Representatives. Using the Republic's then 461 million population to calculate, on average 600,000 people elected one representative in the Legislative Yuan.

The newly elected Legislative Yuan met for the first time on 21 May. These were the only Legislative Yuan elections held in mainland China. Over a year later, the Chinese Communist Party won the Chinese Civil War, forcing the Nationalist government to flee to Taiwan.

== Background ==
In 1928, the Nationalist government completed the Northern Expedition and after achieving unification in the name of China, initiated the "Political Tutelage" period and created the Legislative Yuan. But the Legislative Representatives at the time were not elected, but appointed by the Nationalist government for a 2-year term. There were initially 49 seats, but it was increased to the 194 seats before the Second Sino-Japanese War. However, during the Second World War, the 194 Legislative Representatives selected in 1934's terms were extended until after WWII in 1947.

On 1 January 1947, the Constitution of the Republic of China was published, and in the same year on 25 December promulgated. In April 1947, according to the Political Consultative Conference, the National Government was reorganized to allow other political parties (e.g. Youth Party, Democratic Socialist Party) to enter. In the beginning of 1948, according to the Constitution's Article 64, the first Constitutional Legislative Election was held. Because of the large size of the provinces, not all of the elections in the various provinces were held on the same date. The starting and ending dates were from 21 to 23 January.

Elected government officials under the 1947 Constitution of the Republic of China
Title	Role	Constitutional provisions	Amended provisions	First election
National Assembly delegate	Exercise political powers on behalf of citizens	Directly elected by citizens of county-level divisions	Institution de facto suspended, with its powers transferred to the Legislative Yuan and referendums	1947 Chinese National Assembly election
President	Head of state	Indirectly elected by the National Assembly	Directly elected by the citizens within the Free area	1948 Chinese presidential election
Legislative Yuan members	Legislature	Directly elected by citizens of provincial-level divisions	Directly elected by the citizens within the Free area	1948 Chinese legislative election
Control Yuan members	Monitoring authority	Indirectly elected by provincial legislatures	Parliamentary chamber de facto suspended. Appointed by the President and confirmed by the Legislative Yuan	1947–1948 Chinese control election

Because of the problems that took place during the 1947 National Assembly election (i.e. party candidates were not nominated by their political parties, but by self-gathering voter signatures), the Nationalist Party Central Government strengthened the requirements for party member candidates.

== Election ==
Party	Seats
Party	Legislative Yuan
Kuomintang	716
Democratic Socialist Party	17
Young China Party	6
Independents	20
Total	759

In accordance with the Constitution of the Republic of China, members of the Legislative Yuan shall be elected in accordance with the following provisions:

1. Those to be elected from the provinces and by the municipalities under the direct jurisdiction of the Executive Yuan shall be five for each province or municipality with a population of not more than 3,000,000, one additional member shall be elected for each additional 1,000,000 in a province or municipality whose population is over 3,000,000
2. Those to be elected from Mongolian leagues and banners
3. Those to be elected from Tibet
4. Those to be elected by various racial groups in frontier regions
5. Those to be elected by Chinese citizens residing abroad
6. Those to be elected by occupational groups

The number of women to be elected under the provinces, municipalities, and other items shall be prescribed by law. Based on the census calculations, at the time the citizen population of China numbered at 461 million, in this election 773 representatives were elected. Their numbers are as follows

1. Elected representatives from the provinces and municipalities: 622
2. Elected representatives from the Mongolian leagues: 22
3. Elected representatives from Tibet: 15
4. Elected representatives by various racial groups in frontier regions: 6
5. Elected representatives by Chinese citizens residing abroad: 19
6. Elected representatives by occupational groups: 89

=== Campaigning ===
Legislative Election and Recall Law, article XII, when generating the candidates for the election, once a candidate has over 3000 voters' signatures or has been nominated by the party as a candidate, they may begin campaigning. Those who have failed will not be allowed to campaign. Overseas Chinese and occupational groups can only campaign if they have the required number of voters. Because the constitution had just been promulgated, opposition was small, and most of the nominated candidates were from the Nationalist Party.

== Election process ==
As a process of constitutional succession, before the establishment of the elected government, in accordance with the "End of Political Tutelage Procedure Law", the first Legislative and National Assembly election is to be organized by the National Government. In accordance with the "National Assembly and Legislative Yuan Election Ordinance" from 25 June 1947, the National Government are to establish general elections at the central government office and around the various provinces, municipalities, and counties. In 1948, from 21 to 23 January, the country's 47 provinces, municipalities, 18 Mongolian leagues, Tibetan area, domestic occupational groups, women's organisations, and overseas Chinese regions, making up nearly 200 million voters voted for their legislators. Because of the Chinese Civil War, the elections could not be held in Communist controlled areas, the National government, through the supplementary regulations, had the people living nearest to the areas elect representation for the areas.

Because the Chinese Communist Party refused to participate in the election, only the Chinese Nationalist Party, China Democratic Socialist Party, Chinese Youth Party, and other small party and independents participated. In the election, all citizens who had gone through citizen registration at least 20 years old could vote using the "radio, anonymous, secret" voting system. Not counting the small groups like the occupational groups and the ethnic minority groups, only those who were close to the ballot offices could participate. If using an average 30% between all of the provinces of citizens who have registered, it is estimated that 150 million people participated. Although the turn-out rate was low, this session of the Legislative Yuan and National Assembly remains to date the only session of the Greater China region that has been directly elected.

Also, Sinkiang had 6 seats, but 1 seat of the Yitaasan district was reserved to elected, so only 5 were elected from the province; Tibet Area originally was given 5 seats, but because the Kashag did not report the list on time, 3 of the Tibetan representatives in the capital filled in the seats, and Tibet had 2 vacant seats; Overseas Chinese citizens had 19 seats, but only votes from districts 6 to 13 were counted, electing 8 representatives with 11 vacancies. In total, there were 14 vacancies.

== Aftermath ==
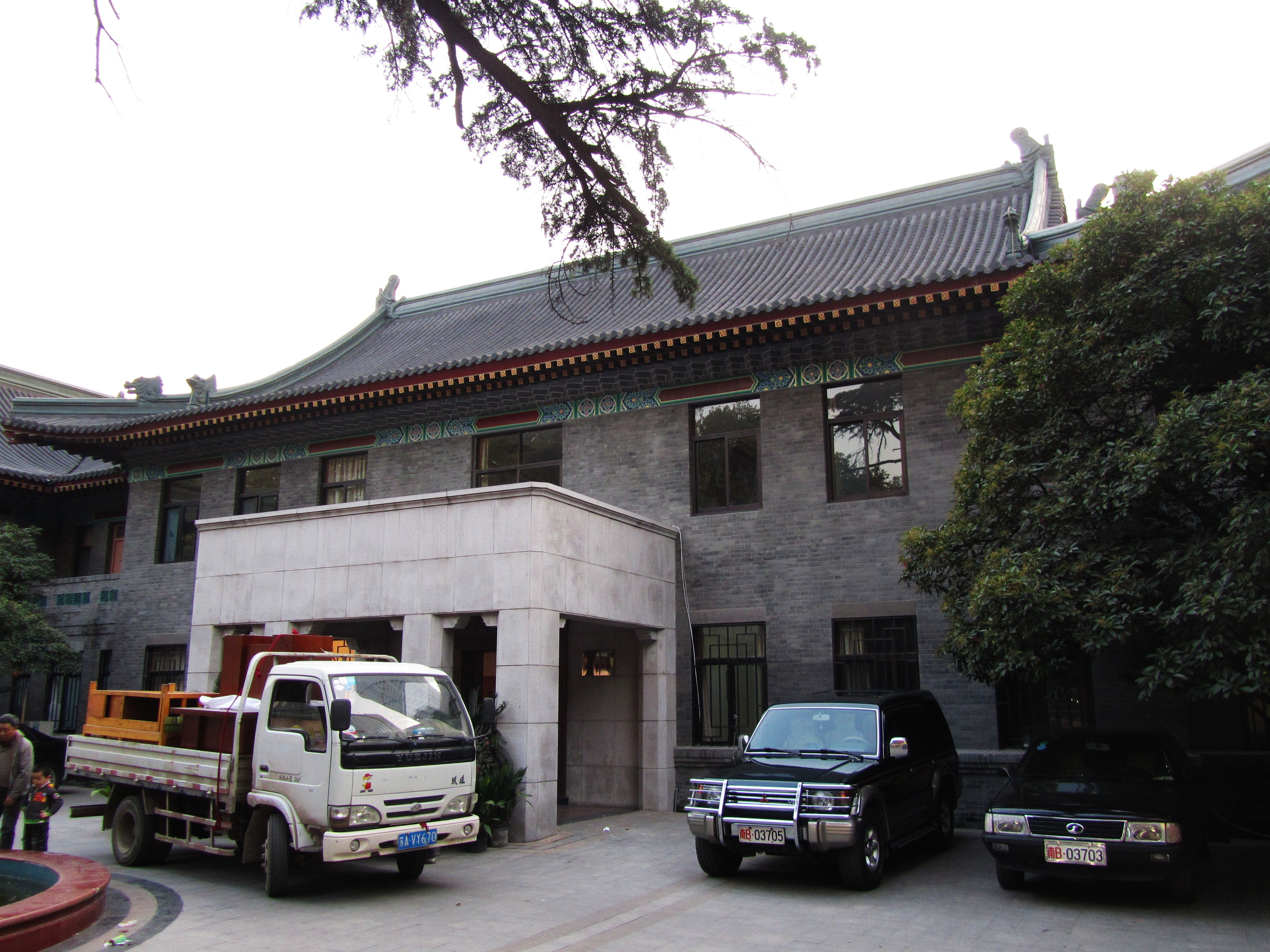
Site of Legislative Yuan Meetings in Nanjing from 1946 to 1949

In 1948, 759 members were elected to the first Legislative Yuan under the rule of the recently promulgated Constitution of the Republic of China. The members convened of their own accord on 8 May in the National Assembly Hall of Nanking and held six preparatory meetings during which Ko Sun (son of Sun Yat-sen) and Li-fu Chen were elected president and vice president respectively. On 18 May, the first meeting of the first session of the first Legislative Yuan officially inaugurated 21 standing committees in operation.

=== 1950 ===
Owing to the Chinese Civil War between the Nationalists, led by the Kuomintang, and the Communists, led by the Chinese Communist Party, the central government was moved to Taipei in 1950. Of the 759 legislators, 380 followed the government to Taiwan. On 24 February of the same year, the remaining legislators gathered for its first meeting of the fifth session at the Sun Yat-sen Hall in Taipei. Before long the Legislative Yuan voted to revise its organization law and reduced the number of the standing committees to 12; at the same time, it set up other ad hoc committees. In 1960, the Legislative Yuan moved to its current location on Chungshan South Road.

=== 1951 ===
The term of the first Legislative Yuan members was supposed to have expired by May 1951, had it not been for a major national conflict that made impossible an election as required by law for the next Legislative Yuan. Accordingly, the Council of Grand Justices of the Judicial Yuan passed the No. 31 Interpretation of the Constitution to justify and legalize continuous performance of these members elected in 1948. During this extended tenure, however, 11 additional members were elected in 1969 to the Legislative Yuan according to the "Temporary Provisions Effective During the Period of Communist Rebellion" to perform their functions together with those remaining members elected in 1948. This situation resulted in a de facto dictatorship led by president Chiang Kai-shek and his cabinet, which lasted until his death and continued under Yen Chia-kan and Chiang Ching-kuo. While the Legislative Yuan seldom rejected measures proposed by the Executive Yuan, it became on the few places where political dissension was formally permitted (as guaranteed by the constitution). Besides members of the Kuomintang, only members of political parties formed before 1948, such as (Chinese Youth Party and China Democratic Socialist Party) or independents were allowed to be candidates. Organized independents (tangwai, "who are outside the party") were not tolerated during this period of time.

=== 1972 ===
In December 1972, the Legislative Yuan was invigorated with 51 additional members of three-year term elected in accordance with the amended "temporary provisions." Subsequently, in December 1975, 52 members were elected and sworn in on 1 February in the following year. The election slated for December 1978 was suspended until 20 November 1980, because of the severance of diplomatic relations between the Republic of China and the United States of America. Yet the number of members elected in that election was increased to 97 in accordance with the "Election and Recall Law During the Period of General National Mobilization for the Suppression of Communist Rebellion". From then onward, 98 members in 1983, 100 members in 1986 and 130 members in 1989 were elected respectively and sworn in on 1 February 1984, 1987 and 1990.

=== 1991 ===
On 31 December 1991, all remaining veteran members elected in 1948 finally retired, and the legislative power was taken over by the 130 additional members elected in 1989.

== National Assembly and legislative election gallery ==
Because the election dates of the two elections are almost the same, it is difficult to determine which election is depicted in the pictures, as a result the pictures are placed together into the same gallery.

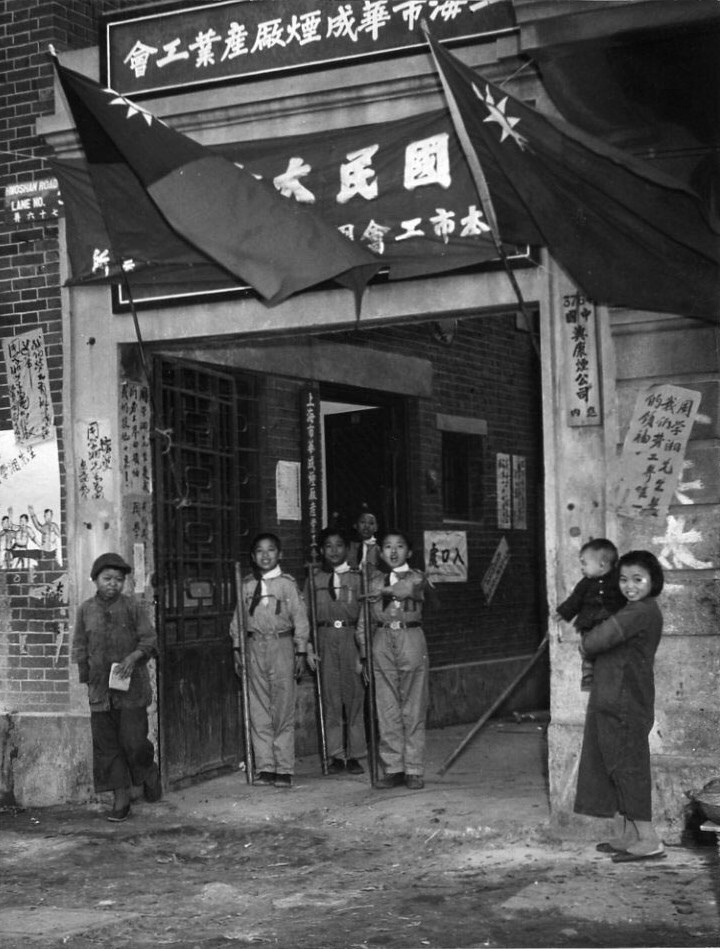
Boy Scouts standing in front of the door of a polling office in Shanghai

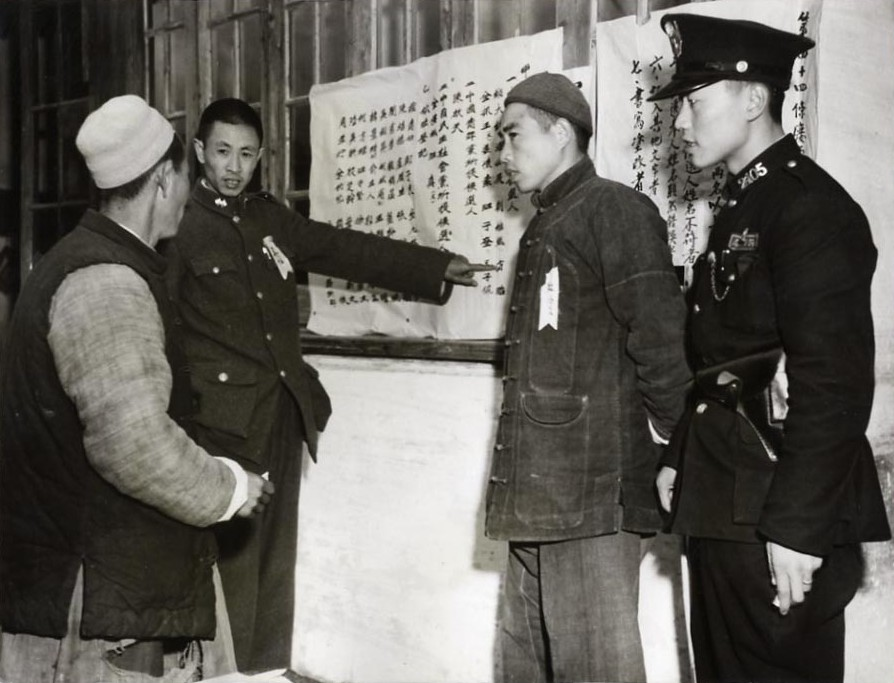
Government officials explaining the rules of the voting process

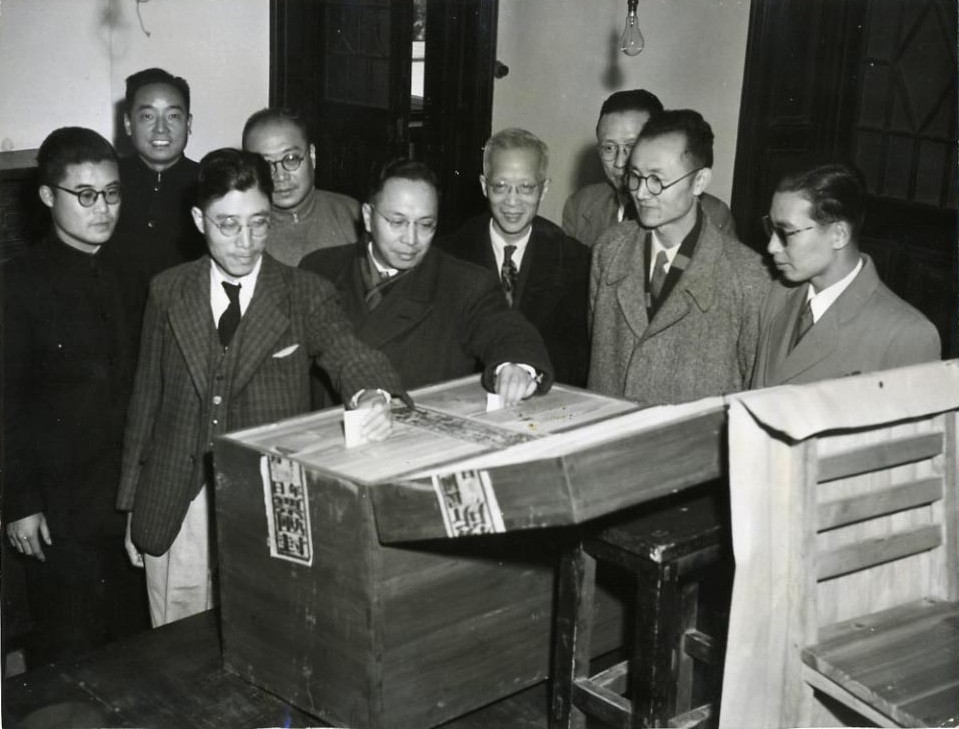
A group of professors of the Jiaotong University of Shanghai casting their ballots

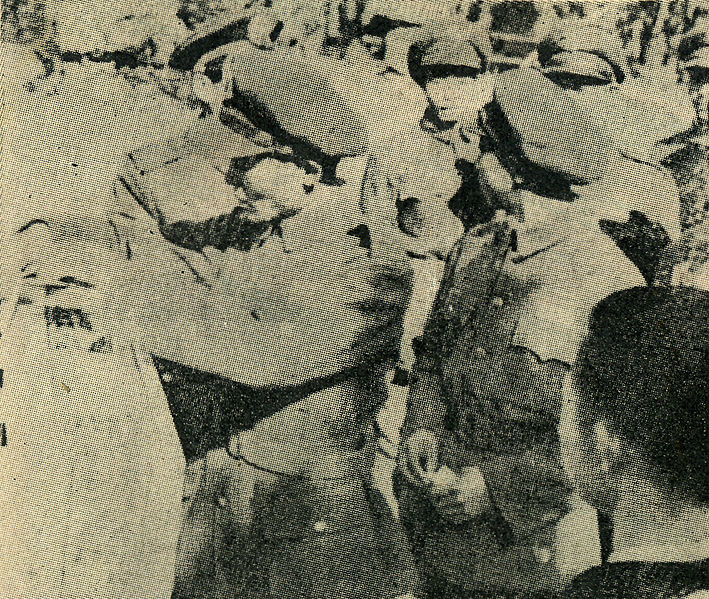
ROC soldiers in Nanking voting

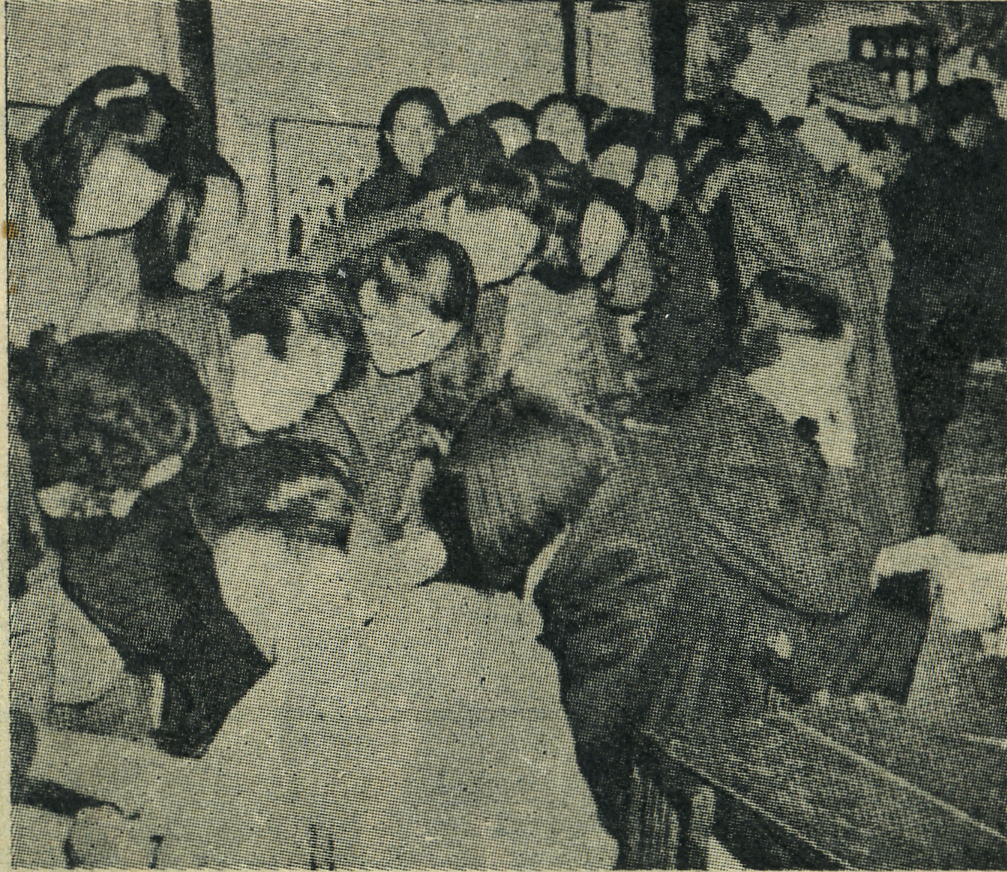
A picture of city folks voting.

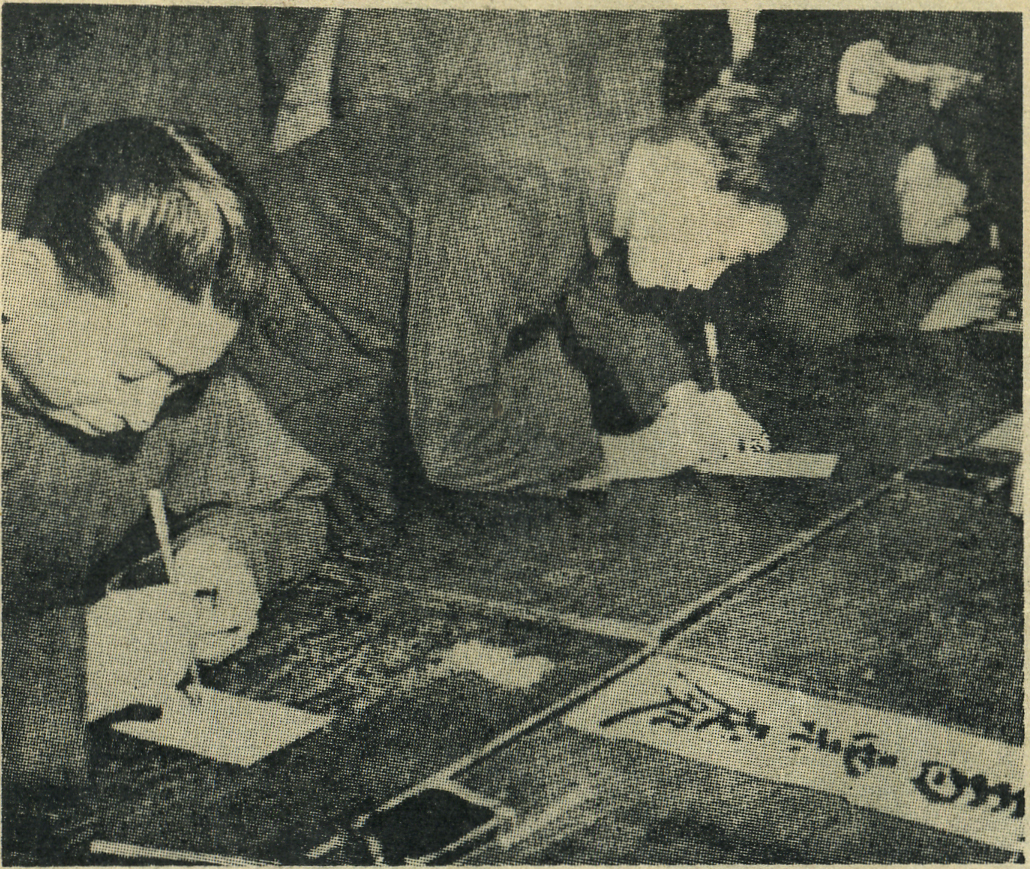
Commoners voting

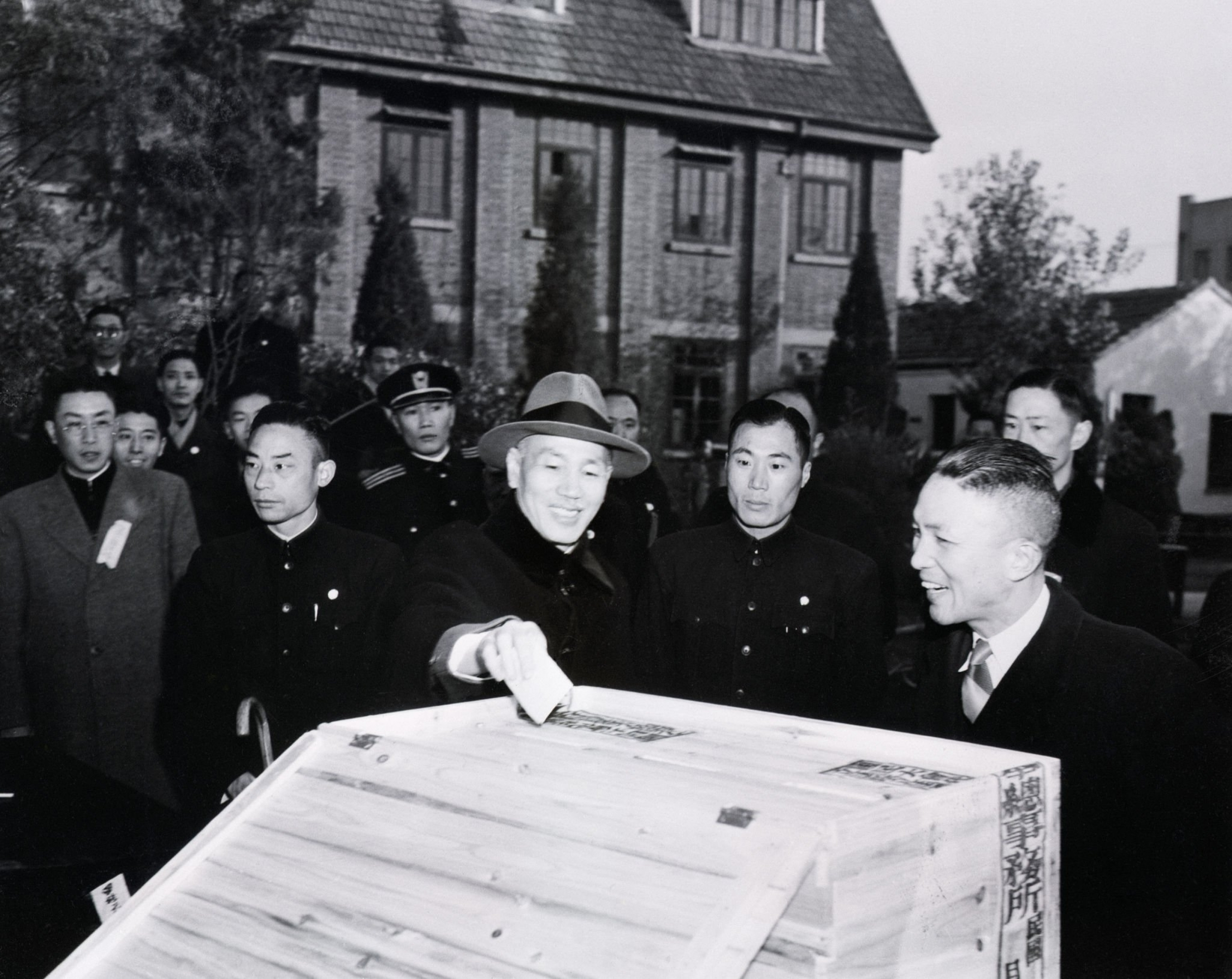
Chiang Kai-shek voting as a commoner for Chen Yuguang

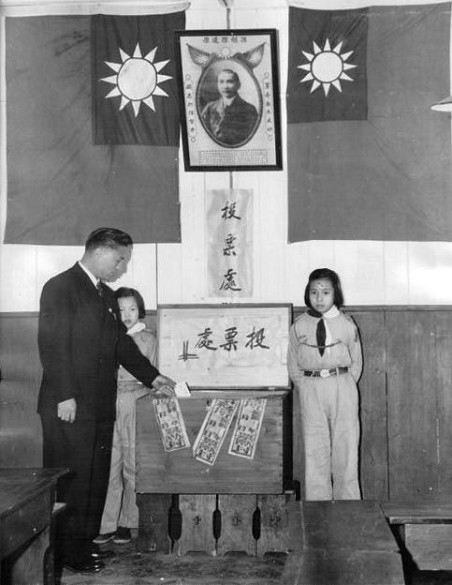
The Nationalist Party flag on the left of Sun Yat-sen's portrait has been replaced by the national flag, signaling the end of the political tutelage period.

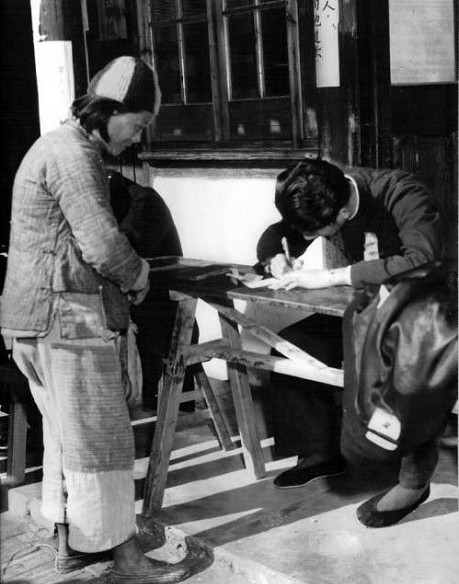
Rural woman voting

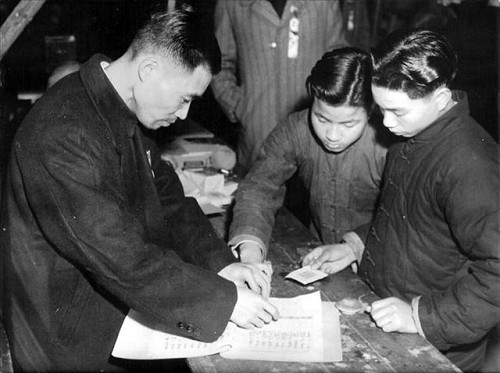
Voting registration

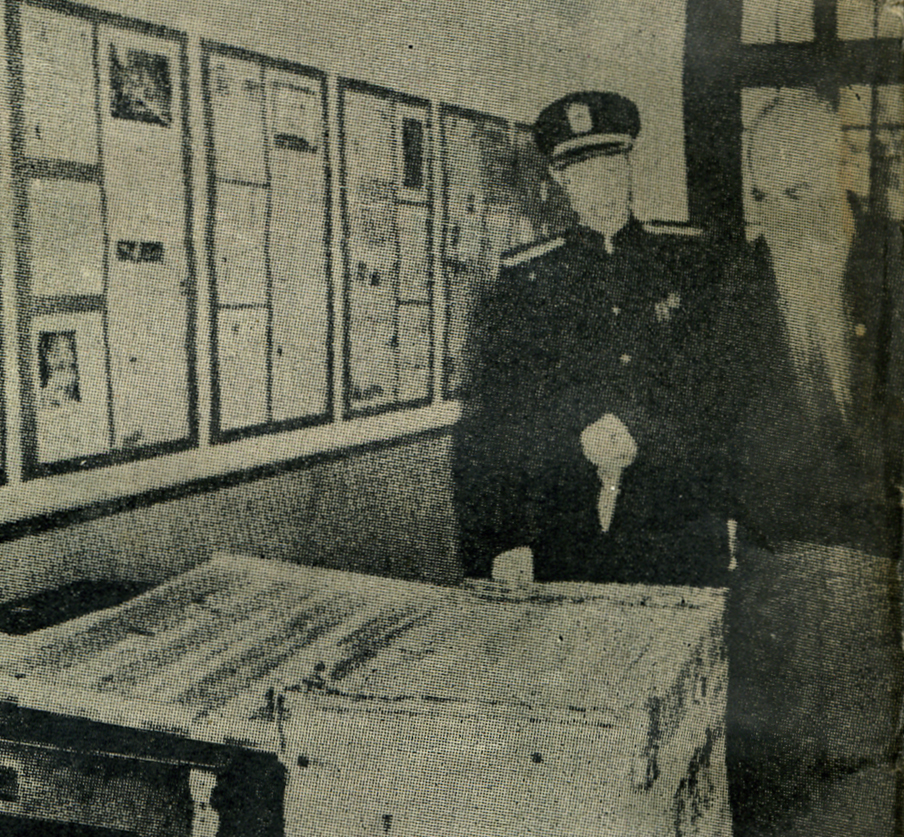
President of the Examination Yuan Yu Youren casting his vote

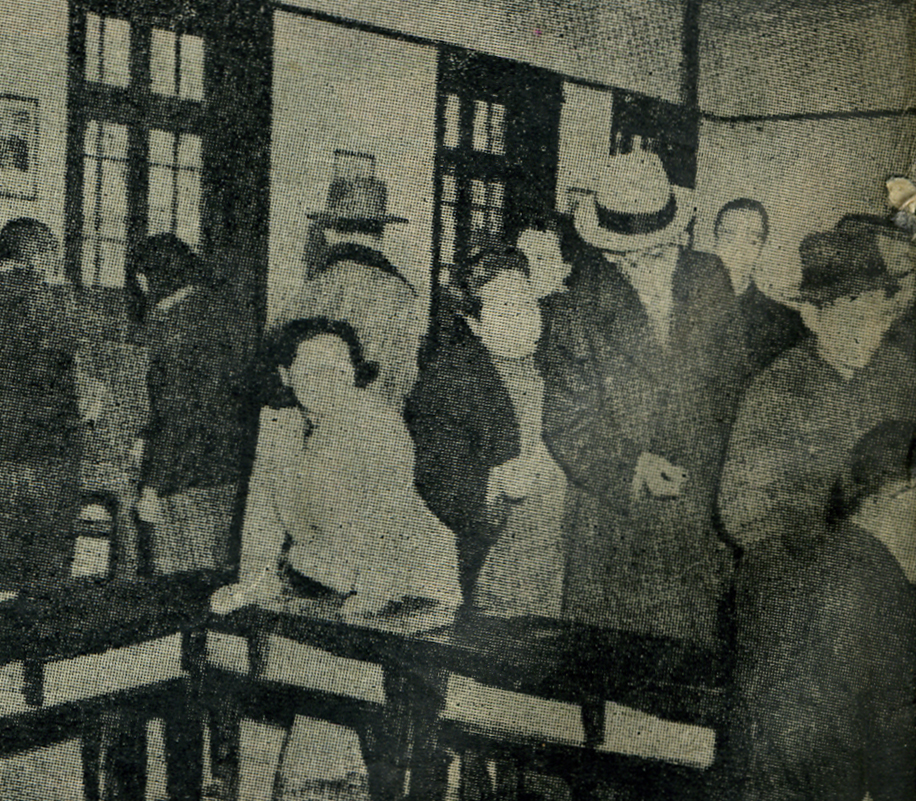
Kuomintang party secretary Wu Tiecheng gets in line with commoners to vote

== Previous and next legislative elections ==
There were some regime changes happened in China during the first half of the 20th century. Depending on the definition, possible previous and next elections for legislatures with similar functions are listed below.

Order	Election	Political entity	Note
Previous	1918 Chinese National Assembly election	Republic of China (1912–1949)	Elected the 2nd National Assembly under the Beiyang government
Next	1st National People's Congress	People's Republic of China	Elected the 1st National People's Congress
Next	1969 Taiwanese legislative election	Republic of China (on Taiwan)	Elected supplementary delegates served together with the 1st National Assembly
Next	1992 Taiwanese legislative election	Republic of China (on Taiwan)	Elected new delegates to form the 2nd Legislative Yuan

== See also ==
- Constitution of the Republic of China
- National Assembly (Republic of China)
- Legislative Yuan
- Control Yuan
- 1947 Chinese National Assembly election
- Chinese Civil War
