= Young China Party =

Young China Party 中國青年黨
- Abbreviation: YCP / CYP
- Chairman: Lin Yishan
- Founded: 2 December 1923; 102 years ago, Paris, France
- Preceded by: The Statists wing of Young China Association
- Headquarters: 3F, 283 Songjiang Rd., Zhongshan District, Taipei
- Ideology: State nationalism (ROC); Chinese conservatism; Chinese nationalism; Anti-communism; Three Principles of the People
- Political position: Right-wing
- National affiliation: China Democratic League (1941–1947)
- Slogan: "Patriotism, Democracy, Anti-independence, Pro-unification" (Note: In local languages: Traditional Chinese script: 愛國、民主、反獨、促統; Mandarin Pinyin: Àiguó, mínzhǔ, fǎn dú, cù tǒng)
- Anthem: "Song of the Young China Party" (Note: In local languages: Traditional Chinese script: 中國青年黨黨歌; Mandarin Pinyin: Zhōngguó Qīngnián Dǎng dǎnggē)

Party flag

Website
- www.ycp.org.tw

Young China Party
- Traditional Chinese: 中國青年黨
- Simplified Chinese: 中国青年党
Transcriptions
Standard Mandarin
- Hanyu Pinyin: Zhōngguó Qīngnián Dǎng
- Bopomofo: ㄓㄨㄥ ㄍㄨㄛˊ ㄑㄧㄥ ㄋㄧㄢˊ ㄉㄤˇ
- Wade–Giles: Chung^{1}kuo^{2} Ch'ing^{1}nien^{2} Tang^{3}
Hakka
- Romanization: Chûng-koet Chhiâng-ngièn Tóng
Southern Min
- Hokkien POJ: Tiong-kok Chheng-liân Tóng

Abbreviation
- Traditional Chinese: 青年黨
- Simplified Chinese: 青年党
Transcriptions
Standard Mandarin
- Hanyu Pinyin: Qīngnián Dǎng
- Bopomofo: ㄑㄧㄥ ㄋㄧㄢˊ ㄉㄤˇ
- Wade–Giles: Ch'ing^{1}nien^{2} Tang^{3}
Hakka
- Romanization: Chhiâng-ngièn Tóng
Southern Min
- Hokkien POJ: Chheng-liân Tóng

The Young China Party (YCP), (Note: In local languages: Traditional Chinese script: 中國青年黨; Mandarin Pinyin: Zhōngguó Qīngnián Dǎng; Hokkien: Tiong-kok Chheng-liân Tóng; Sixian Hakka: Chûng-koet Chhiâng-ngièn Tóng) also known as the Chinese Youth Party (CYP), is a minor political party in the Republic of China (Taiwan). It was one of the three legal political parties in Taiwan during the martial law period from 1949 to 1987, the other two being the Kuomintang and the China Democratic Socialist Party. The YCP was an important political party during the early history of the Republic of China, when its government was based on the mainland.

== History ==
Before the foundation of Young China Party in 1923. Several of its early organizers had previously been active in the Young China Association, a patriotic cultural association founded in 1918 that promoted cultural modernization through journals and study societies. Within the Association, a communist wing led by figures such as Li Dazhao and Zhang Wentian gravitated toward communism, while a statist wing associated with Zeng Qi and Li Huang later carried its ideas into the formation of the YCP after the Association's dissolution in 1925.

The Young China Party was founded by a group of Chinese students in Paris, France on 2 December 1923. It was originally known as the Chinese Étatiste Youth League (also translated as the Chinese Statist Youth League), but renamed after some time. Their name was inspired by the Young Turks and Young Italy. Given China's weakened condition in the early 1920s, the YCP's primary platform was to advocate the elimination of China's warlords and the establishment of a strong central government. It also promoted a nationalist agenda which focused on the abolition of the special privileges and extraterritoriality which foreign powers had obtained in China during the final years of the Qing dynasty. It was also strongly anti-communist. The party was made up largely of landlords, school teachers, and businessmen, similar to the Kuomintang.

Zeng Qi, the party's first chairman, and other YCP founders such as Li Huang, He Luzhi (何魯之) and Li Buwei (李不韙) returned to China starting in 1924. The YCP then established party organizations in Shanghai, other major Chinese cities, and among overseas Chinese communities in Southeast Asia. From its foundation, the YCP's rank and file strength consisted mainly of students and intellectuals.

Initially called the China National Youth Corps, the YCP acquired its current name during its fourth national convention in September 1929. During the Northern Expedition, the party supported the northern warlords because they opposed the Communists within the First United Front. After the anti-communist purge, they still resisted the KMT because of its one-party state.

The party was banned after the Nationalists came to power in 1928 and the YCP refused Chiang Kai-shek's offer to merge the two parties. The Nationalists denounced them as a warlord party due to their early failed attempts to recruit Wu Peifu and their opposition to the Northern Expedition. The Communists called them fascists because of their strident anti-communism and their leaders' ties to the French fascists. The YCP considered itself to be a democratic parliamentary conservative party.

They were based in Manchuria under the protection of Zhang Xueliang. After the Japanese invasion of Manchuria in 1931, the YCP called for an immediate declaration of war against Japan, in contrast with the Nationalist government's resistance to a formal war declaration and initiating hostilities. The YCP joined the anti-Japanese United Front in 1937 to support the national government. After the initiation of the full-scale war, the YCP cooperated closely with the Kuomintang (KMT) in fighting the Japanese military aggression. It joined the China Democratic League, an umbrella group of small democratic parties. In the early years of the war, the Youth Party became the third largest party, after the KMT and the CCP, yet one informed historian called the party organization "extremely weak." The members were either personal friends of Carsun Chang, many of whom had been followers of Liang Qichao, or his former students. Qian Duansheng criticized Chang as "neither an organizer himself not a man able to pick capable men to organize for him." John Melby, an American diplomat who knew Chang during the war, felt that Chang was as "unrealistic" as his brother, Chang Kia-ngau, was hard headed. As a scholar, Melby conceded, Chang was "highly intelligent and well educated," but as a politician he was "utopian" and "ineffectual."

In April 1945, one of the YCP's founders, Li Huang was appointed as one of the Republic of China's delegates to the San Francisco Conference at which the United Nations organization was created. The party left the CDL when it became pro-Communist after the war.

During the 1947 Republic of China National Assembly election, the YCP won more than 100 seats in the National Assembly and 16 seats in the Legislative Yuan. During the formation of the first cabinet of the constitutional government in 1948, the YCP's Chen Qitian (陳啓天) was appointed minister of commerce and industry, and party head Zuo Shunsheng (左舜生) was appointed minister of agriculture and forestry.

After the Chinese Communist Revolution, many of the YCP's leadership and members moved overseas or relocated to Taiwan with the central government, though the YCP's headquarters were officially moved to Taipei only in 1969. The YCP cooperated closely with the KMT after 1949 and continually obtained seats in the National Assembly, Legislative Yuan and Control Yuan well into the late 1980s.

Given its intellectual foundations, the YCP placed great emphasis on periodicals and printed several reference books on party history and platforms. These include Brief History of the Young China Party, Biography of Past Members of the YCP, Fifty Years of the Young China Party and The Essay on Nationalism, all published in the early 1970s around the party's 50th anniversary. The YCP also published periodicals such as the fortnightly Democratic Tide, and the monthly The Modern Nation, National Tribune and Awakened Lion. For basic background on the YCP, please refer to the Republic of China 1987 - A Reference Book, published by the Government Information Office of the Republic of China.

In the 1990s, the YCP lost all of their seats and failed to gain elected representation after Taiwan's democratic transition. Continuing as a minor force in politics, it intended to participate in the 2020 Legislative Yuan election, but did not join. The party supports Chinese unification under a democratic China and opposes Taiwan independence and "One Country, Two Systems". It also supported the 2019 Hong Kong protests and condemned the actions of Hong Kong police.

== Ideology ==
The YCP is a Chinese nationalist party which follows Sun Yat-sen's Three Principles of the People. The party supports the unification of Taiwan and mainland China, but opposes the rule of the Chinese Communist Party.

== Election results ==
=== Legislative elections ===
Election	Total seats won	Total votes	Share of votes	Changes	Election leader	Status	President
1948	6 / 759				Zeng Qi	Minority	Zeng Qi
1969	0 / 11	111,187	3.16%	▼6		Minority	
1972	1 / 51	129,115	2.68%	▲1		Minority	
1975	1 / 52	143,992	2.31%	Steady		Minority	
1980	0 / 97	57,919	0.91%	▼1		Minority	
1983	2 / 98				Li Huang	Minority	
1986	2 / 100				Li Huang	Minority	
1989	1 / 130			▼1	Li Huang	Minority	
1992	0 / 161	1,035	0.01%	▼1	Liu Zipeng	Minority	
1998	0 / 161	723	0.01%	Steady	Xu Pengfei	Minority	

=== National Assembly elections ===
Election	Total seats won	Total votes	Share of votes	Changes	Party leader	Status
1947	76 / 3,045	?	?		Zeng Qi	Minority
1991	0 / 325	1,573	0.02%	Steady	Liu Zipeng	Minority
1996	0 / 334	6,197	0.06%	Steady	Zhao Chunxiao	Minority

== See also ==
- Neo-Legalism
- Category:Young China Party politicians
