= Li Huang =

Chinese politician (1895–1991)

- 李璜
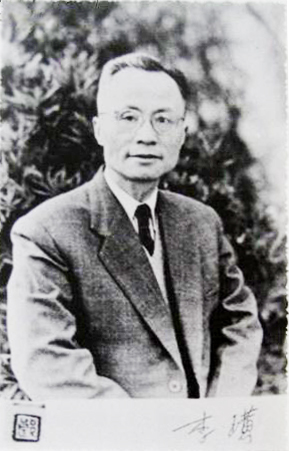
- Li Huang
- Born: 1895; Chengdu, Sichuan
- Died: 15 November 1991 (aged 95–96); Taipei, Republic of China
- Other names: Xuechun (學純); Youchun (幼椿; Baqian (八千)
- Occupation: Politician
- Known for: Co-founder of the Young China Party

Li Huang (1895 – 15 November 1991) was a Chinese politician and educator. While studying in France from 1919–1924, he was one of the founders of the Young China Party. After returning to China, he taught French literature in several universities in the 1920s through the 1940s. During the Second Sino-Japanese War the Youth Party joined the China Democratic League, a "Third Force" independent of both the Chinese Communist Party and the Nationalist government of Chiang Kai-shek.

== Youth and education in France ==
Li Huang's father was a prosperous merchant in Chengdu, where Li joined the Young China Study Association, an informal group that brought young intellectuals together for informal but wide-ranging discussions. He went to France in 1919 to study sociology and literature. Li earned a Master's Degree. The Chinese community in France debated cultural and political strategies for the future of China, and Li joined in the debates. The Diligent Work-Frugal Study Movement, sponsored by Li Shizeng and his group of anarchists, arranged for Chinese students to work in French factories order to pay for their studies. Li did not formally join the group, but took part in some of their activities. Li had more contact with French families than most of the Work-Study students did, and he contributed his time to tutor them. Li recalled in his memoirs that many of the students were "provincial" and that he had to show them how to eat bread, drink wine, and wear western clothes instead of their Chinese padded jackets. In time, he became discouraged at their lack of motivation.

Li and his friends Zuo Shunsheng and Zeng Qi became alarmed at the spread of Marxism among the students, such as Zhou Enlai, who became radicalized and joined the Communist Party. In December 1923, Li and other Chinese students founded the Youth Party in Paris. They proclaimed that their objective was "internally eliminating the national robbers [the Communists and warlords] and externally resisting the foreign powers." The original name was the Chinese Nationalist Youth Corps (Guojiazhuyi qingniantuan), though the word "Youth" did not refer to the age of the founders, but was rather a reference to the "Young Turks" in Turkey upon whom the new party was modelled.

Li's later account of the influence of the Comintern on Chinese students in Europe in his memoir Xuedunshi huiyilu (Memoirs from the Xuedun Study) has been widely accepted as lively and accurate, but the American historian Marilyn Avra Levine's research found that his account of Marxist developments contained errors of fact and interpretation.

== Third Force politics in China ==
On their return to China, Li and other leaders organized the Young China Party in Shanghai. The CYP held its First Party Congress in 1926, but the new Nationalist Government of Chiang Kai-shek outlawed the party and arrested many members when they refused to support the GMD after the breakup of the United Front. Li fled to Sichuan, where the CYP had connections with the provincial government. Although leftists accused Li's CYP of being a "fascist" because of its strong anti-communism and nationalistic programs, Li and his colleagues insisted that their support of the Nationalist government was contingent on its support for democratic programs.

Li and Zhang Junmai, a close follower of Liang Qichao, collaborated on a journal, Xin Lu (New Way), for which Zhang raised most of the money and Li wrote most of the content. The journal favored democracy, civil rights, national autonomy, unification, and raising the standard of living for workers and farmers. Zhang's writings focused on criticizing the Nationalist while Li's target was the Communists. The CYP also organized a training institute for young party workers in which Li played a major role.

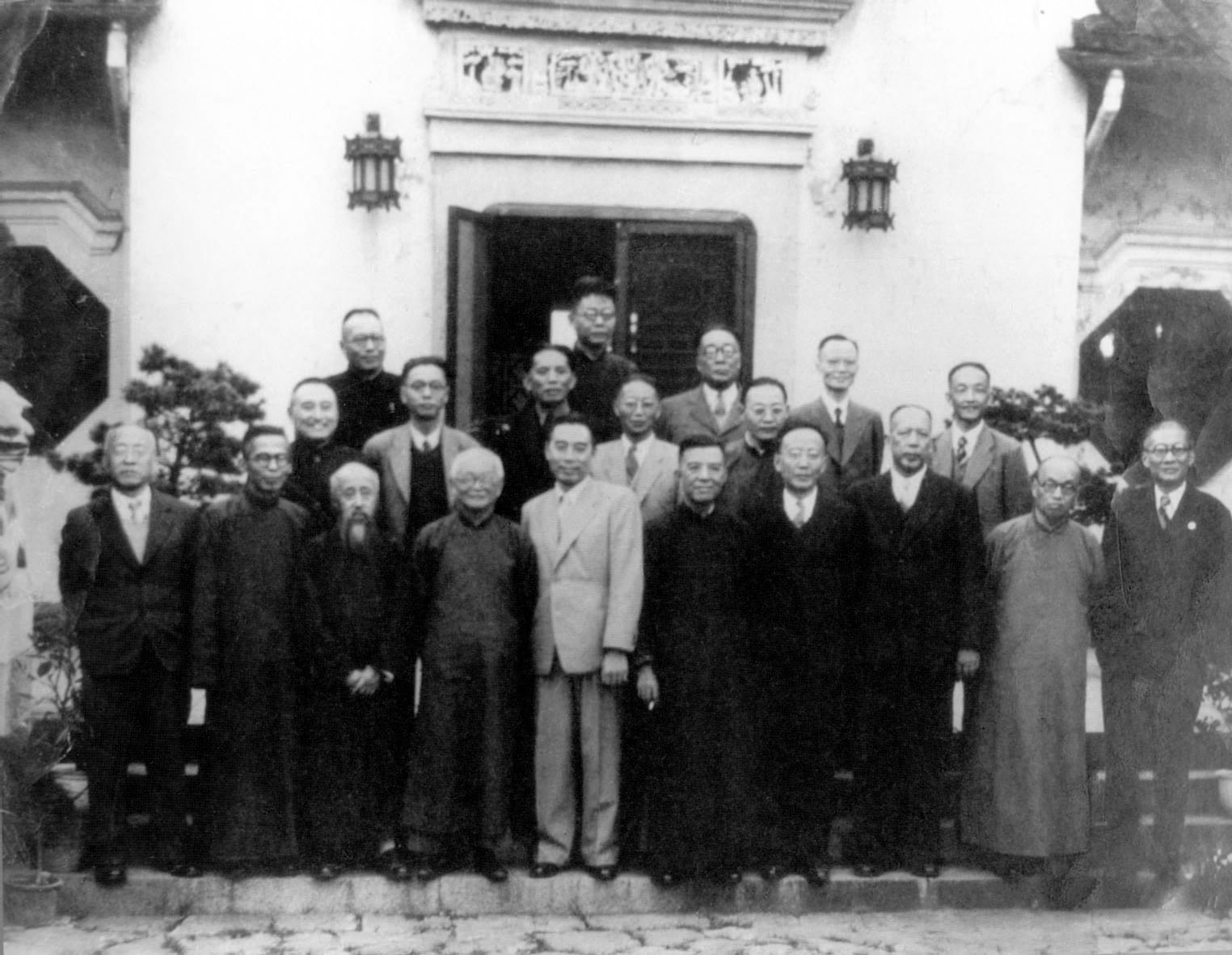
Li (far right) with China Democratic League Members and Zhou Enlai (center) Nanjing, 1946

Although Chiang Kai-shek's police harassed the leadership of the CYP and drove it underground, in 1937, the CYP joined the anti-Japanese United Front to support the national government. In the early years of the war, the Youth Party became the third largest party, after the Nationalists and the Communists. One informed observer, however, called the party organization "extremely weak" because most members were either personal friends of Zhang Junmai, many of whom had also been followers of Liang Qichao, or former students of Li or his friends. Li visited Shanxi province in brief hope that its military leader, Yan Xishan and his program of military and industrial development could be a base for CYP organizing, but returned wondering how this "barren land with its impoverished people" could "manage to build up a model province in the North?"

Following the end of the war, Li continued to be a prominent member of the CYP, but did not have the high position he once held. The Party joined the China Democratic League, an alliance of smaller parties allied neither to the ruling Nationalists or the Communists. Li was a China delegate at the New York opening meeting of the United Nations in 1945, then in 1947 again withdrew his support of Chiang Kai-shek, and moved to Hong Kong. He remained there until moving to Taiwan in the 1960s, where he died in 1991.
