= Zeng Qi =

Chinese politician (1892–1951)

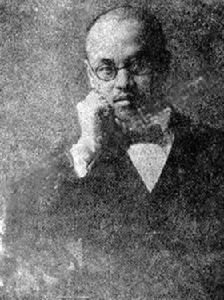

Zeng Qi (Chinese: 曾琦; Wade–Giles: Tseng Ch'i; 1892 – May 7, 1951) was a politician in Republican China. He was the founder and chairman of the Young China Party, the third largest party (behind the Nationalist Party and the Communist Party) in China at the time.

== Sources ==
- "Zeng Qi Papers Announcement". hoover.org. 2010-10-26.
