= 1972 Taiwanese legislative election =

The second supplementary elections took place for the National Assembly and Legislative Yuan of the Republic of China (Taiwan) on 23 December 1972.

== Background ==
Compared with the first supplementary election the number of eligible seats for the National Assembly had been increased from 15 to 53 and for the Legislative Yuan from 11 to 51. Of these, 36 seats for the Legislative Yuan represented Taiwan Province, Kinmen and Matsu, and the special municipality of Taipei and were to be elected directly. The remaining 15 seats for the Legislative Yuan represented overseas nationals and were chosen by the President.

== Results ==
Turnout for the supplementary election of the National Assembly was 68.35% and 68.18% for the Legislative Yuan. Of the newly elected members to the National Assembly 43 belonged to the Kuomintang and 10 were independent. Of the 36 elected delegates to the Legislative Yuan 30 belonged to the Kuomintang, 5 were independent and 1 belonged to the Chinese Youth Party. All representatives chosen were born Taiwanese except for 10 (5 in each of the legislative bodies) who were from the Mainland.

=== Legislative Yuan ===
Party	Votes	%	Seats	+/–
Kuomintang	3,590,344	74.50	41	+33
Chinese Youth Party	129,115	2.68	1	+1
Independents	1,099,564	22.82	9	+6
Total	4,819,023	100.00	51	+40
Valid votes	4,819,023	92.90		
Invalid/blank votes	368,289	7.10		
Total votes	5,187,312	100.00		
Registered voters/turnout	7,608,589	68.18		
Source: Nohlen et al., Dong

==== By constituency ====
Constituency	Seats	Electorate	Turnout	%	Party	Votes	%	Seats won
Taipei City	5	923,966	519,275	56.20	Kuomintang	307,628	61.88	3
Taipei City	5	923,966	519,275	56.20	Independents	189,449	38.12	2
Taiwan I	3	916,375	614,373	67.04	Kuomintang	411,505	70.51	2
Taiwan I	3	916,375	614,373	67.04	Chinese Youth Party	129,115	22.12	1
Taiwan I	3	916,375	614,373	67.04	Independents	42,990	7.37	0
Taiwan II	3	802,003	565,727	70.54	Kuomintang	383,019	72.71	3
Taiwan II	3	802,003	565,727	70.54	Independents	143,774	27.29	0
Taiwan III	5	1,314,038	885,965	67.42	Kuomintang	559,013	68.66	4
Taiwan III	5	1,314,038	885,965	67.42	Independents	255,148	31.34	1
Taiwan IV	5	1,346,760	914,183	67.88	Kuomintang	574,138	67.90	4
Taiwan IV	5	1,346,760	914,183	67.88	Independents	271,431	32.10	1
Taiwan V	4	1,107,689	777,566	70.20	Kuomintang	644,256	89.28	4
Taiwan V	4	1,107,689	777,566	70.20	Independents	77,323	10.72	0
Taiwan VI	1	216,229	157,412	72.80	Kuomintang	149,055	100	1
Fujian	1	33,109	30,903	93.34	Kuomintang	30,648	100	1
Highland Aborigine	1	114,479	95,986	83.85	Kuomintang	92,081	100	1
Farmers	2	325,198	266,481	81.94	Kuomintang	173,244	74.55	2
Farmers	2	325,198	266,481	81.94	Independents	59,152	25.45	0
Fishermen	1	99,257	67,633	68.14	Kuomintang	59,647	100	1
Workers	2	300,014	207,115	69.04	Kuomintang	127,085	67.82	1
Workers	2	300,014	207,115	69.04	Independents	60,303	32.18	1
Industrial group	1	12,028	7,835	65.14	Kuomintang	7,057	100	1
Business group	1	76,572	60,543	79.07	Kuomintang	55,111	100	1
Education group	1	20,872	18,365	87.99	Kuomintang	16,857	100	1
Source: Dong

=== National Assembly ===
Party	Votes	%	Seats	+/–
Kuomintang			43	+28
Independents			10	+10
Total			53	+38
Valid votes	4,796,195	93.95		
Invalid/blank votes	308,972	6.05		
Total votes	5,105,167	100.00		
Registered voters/turnout	7,555,694	67.57		
Source: Nohlen et al.
