= List of rulers of Taiwan =

This is a list of the highest-ranked rulers based on the island of Taiwan.

== Dutch and Spanish Formosa (1624–1662) ==
=== Dutch Formosa (1624–1662) ===
The Dutch Empire, during the period of the Dutch United Provinces and under the auspices of the Dutch East India Company (VOC), attempted to conquer Macau in 1622. Later they colonized the Pescadores Islands, where they built a fort in Makung. In 1624, the Chinese attacked, and the Dutch were driven to Taiwan (then called Formosa, meaning "beautiful island"). That year they established Fort Zeelandia on Taiwan's southwest coast. In 1637, the Dutch conquered Favorolang (also Favorlang; present day Huwei, Yunlin). The names listed here are the Dutch governors:

Dutch Formosa (Nederlands Formosa)
No.	Portrait	Name	From	Until
1		Martinus Sonck	1624	1625
2		Gerard Frederikszoon de With	1625	1627
3		Pieter Nuyts	1627	1629
4		Hans Putmans	1629	1636
5		Johan van der Burg	1636	1640
6		Paulus Traudenius	1640	1643
7		Maximilian le Maire	1643	1644
8		François Caron	1644	1646
9		Pieter Anthoniszoon Overtwater	1646	1649
10		Nicolas Verburg	1649	1653
11		Cornelis Caesar	1653	1656
12		Frederick Coyett	1656	1662

=== Spanish Formosa (1626–1642) ===
In response to the Dutch settlements, the Spanish settled at Keelung on the northeast coast of the island in 1626 and built Fort San Salvador. Later they built another outpost, Fort Santo Domingo, at Tamsui in the northwest. In 1629 these forts had a combined total of about 200 Spaniards and 400 Filipinos. By 1635, the Tamsui settlement was abandoned; however, the Keelung settlement remained in Spanish hands until 1642, when a Dutch force of 11 ships and 1,000 men attacked the fort of 446 people. The Spanish surrendered.

Governor of Keelung
Spanish Formosa (Isla Hermosa Española) - Keelung (Cheylam)
No.	Portrait	Name	From	Until	President of the Council of Indies (Term of office)	Governor-General of the Philippines (Term of office)	Viceroy of New Spain (Term of office)	Valido (Term of office)	Monarch (Reign)
1		Antonio Carreño de Valdes 伐爾得斯	16 May 1626	1629	García de Avellaneda y Haro; Ad Interim (January – August 1626)	Fernándo de Silva; Ad Interim (July 1624 – 29 June 1626)	Rodrigo Pacheco, 3rd Marquess of Cerralvo (3 November 1624 – 16 September 1635)	Count-Duke of Olivares (25 January 1622 – 23 January 1643)	Philip IV; House of Habsburg (31 March 1621 – 17 September 1665)
1		Antonio Carreño de Valdes 伐爾得斯	16 May 1626	1629	García de Avellaneda y Haro; Ad Interim (January – August 1626)	Juan Niño de Tabora (29 June 1626 – 22 July 1632)	Rodrigo Pacheco, 3rd Marquess of Cerralvo (3 November 1624 – 16 September 1635)	Count-Duke of Olivares (25 January 1622 – 23 January 1643)	Philip IV; House of Habsburg (31 March 1621 – 17 September 1665)
1		Antonio Carreño de Valdes 伐爾得斯	16 May 1626	1629	Juan de Mendoza, Marquis de la Hinojosa (August 1626– 24 February 1628)	Juan Niño de Tabora (29 June 1626 – 22 July 1632)	Rodrigo Pacheco, 3rd Marquess of Cerralvo (3 November 1624 – 16 September 1635)	Count-Duke of Olivares (25 January 1622 – 23 January 1643)	Philip IV; House of Habsburg (31 March 1621 – 17 September 1665)
1		Antonio Carreño de Valdes 伐爾得斯	16 May 1626	1629	Lorenzo de Cárdenas Valda y Zárate; Ad Interim (24 February 1628 – 26 November 1632)	Juan Niño de Tabora (29 June 1626 – 22 July 1632)	Rodrigo Pacheco, 3rd Marquess of Cerralvo (3 November 1624 – 16 September 1635)	Count-Duke of Olivares (25 January 1622 – 23 January 1643)	Philip IV; House of Habsburg (31 March 1621 – 17 September 1665)
2		Juan de Alcarazo 阿爾卡拉索	1629	1634	Lorenzo de Cárdenas Valda y Zárate; Ad Interim (24 February 1628 – 26 November 1632)	Juan Niño de Tabora (29 June 1626 – 22 July 1632)	Rodrigo Pacheco, 3rd Marquess of Cerralvo (3 November 1624 – 16 September 1635)	Count-Duke of Olivares (25 January 1622 – 23 January 1643)	Philip IV; House of Habsburg (31 March 1621 – 17 September 1665)
2		Juan de Alcarazo 阿爾卡拉索	1629	1634	Lorenzo de Cárdenas Valda y Zárate; Ad Interim (24 February 1628 – 26 November 1632)	Lorenzo de Olaza; Real Audiencia (22 July 1632 – 1633)	Rodrigo Pacheco, 3rd Marquess of Cerralvo (3 November 1624 – 16 September 1635)	Count-Duke of Olivares (25 January 1622 – 23 January 1643)	Philip IV; House of Habsburg (31 March 1621 – 17 September 1665)
2		Juan de Alcarazo 阿爾卡拉索	1629	1634	García de Avellaneda y Haro (26 November 1632 – 10 November 1653)	Lorenzo de Olaza; Real Audiencia (22 July 1632 – 1633)	Rodrigo Pacheco, 3rd Marquess of Cerralvo (3 November 1624 – 16 September 1635)	Count-Duke of Olivares (25 January 1622 – 23 January 1643)	Philip IV; House of Habsburg (31 March 1621 – 17 September 1665)
2		Juan de Alcarazo 阿爾卡拉索	1629	1634	García de Avellaneda y Haro (26 November 1632 – 10 November 1653)	Juan Cerezo de Salamanca Ad Interim (29 August 1633 – 25 June 1635)	Rodrigo Pacheco, 3rd Marquess of Cerralvo (3 November 1624 – 16 September 1635)	Count-Duke of Olivares (25 January 1622 – 23 January 1643)	Philip IV; House of Habsburg (31 March 1621 – 17 September 1665)
3		Alonso García Romero 羅美洛	1634	1639	García de Avellaneda y Haro (26 November 1632 – 10 November 1653)	Juan Cerezo de Salamanca Ad Interim (29 August 1633 – 25 June 1635)	Rodrigo Pacheco, 3rd Marquess of Cerralvo (3 November 1624 – 16 September 1635)	Count-Duke of Olivares (25 January 1622 – 23 January 1643)	Philip IV; House of Habsburg (31 March 1621 – 17 September 1665)
3		Alonso García Romero 羅美洛	1634	1639	García de Avellaneda y Haro (26 November 1632 – 10 November 1653)	Sebastián Hurtado de Corcuera (25 June 1635 – 11 August 1644)	Rodrigo Pacheco, 3rd Marquess of Cerralvo (3 November 1624 – 16 September 1635)	Count-Duke of Olivares (25 January 1622 – 23 January 1643)	Philip IV; House of Habsburg (31 March 1621 – 17 September 1665)
3		Alonso García Romero 羅美洛	1634	1639	García de Avellaneda y Haro (26 November 1632 – 10 November 1653)	Sebastián Hurtado de Corcuera (25 June 1635 – 11 August 1644)	Lope Díez de Armendáriz, 1st Marquess of Cadreita (16 September 1635 – 27 August 1640)	Count-Duke of Olivares (25 January 1622 – 23 January 1643)	Philip IV; House of Habsburg (31 March 1621 – 17 September 1665)
4		Pedro Palomino 帕囉米諾	1639	1640	García de Avellaneda y Haro (26 November 1632 – 10 November 1653)	Sebastián Hurtado de Corcuera (25 June 1635 – 11 August 1644)	Lope Díez de Armendáriz, 1st Marquess of Cadreita (16 September 1635 – 27 August 1640)	Count-Duke of Olivares (25 January 1622 – 23 January 1643)	Philip IV; House of Habsburg (31 March 1621 – 17 September 1665)
4		Pedro Palomino 帕囉米諾	1639	1640	García de Avellaneda y Haro (26 November 1632 – 10 November 1653)	Sebastián Hurtado de Corcuera (25 June 1635 – 11 August 1644)	Diego López Pacheco, 7th Duke of Escalona (27 August 1640 – 10 June 1642)	Count-Duke of Olivares (25 January 1622 – 23 January 1643)	Philip IV; House of Habsburg (31 March 1621 – 17 September 1665)
5		Gonzalo Portillo 波爾的里奧	1640	1642	García de Avellaneda y Haro (26 November 1632 – 10 November 1653)	Sebastián Hurtado de Corcuera (25 June 1635 – 11 August 1644)	Diego López Pacheco, 7th Duke of Escalona (27 August 1640 – 10 June 1642)	Count-Duke of Olivares (25 January 1622 – 23 January 1643)	Philip IV; House of Habsburg (31 March 1621 – 17 September 1665)
5		Gonzalo Portillo 波爾的里奧	1640	1642	García de Avellaneda y Haro (26 November 1632 – 10 November 1653)	Sebastián Hurtado de Corcuera (25 June 1635 – 11 August 1644)	Juan de Palafox y Mendoza (10 June – 23 November 1642)	Count-Duke of Olivares (25 January 1622 – 23 January 1643)	Philip IV; House of Habsburg (31 March 1621 – 17 September 1665)

Governor of Tamsui
Spanish Formosa (Isla Hermosa Española) - Tamsui (Tamchuy)
No.	Portrait	Name	From	Until	President of the Council of Indies (Term of office)	Governor-General of the Philippines (Term of office)	Viceroy of New Spain (Term of office)	Valido (Term of office)	Monarch (Reign)
1		Antonio Carreño de Valdes 伐爾得斯	1627	1629	Juan de Mendoza, Marquis de la Hinojosa (August 1626– 24 February 1628)	Juan Niño de Tabora (29 June 1626 – 22 July 1632)	Rodrigo Pacheco, 3rd Marquess of Cerralvo (3 November 1624 – 16 September 1635)	Count-Duke of Olivares (25 January 1622 – 23 January 1643)	Philip IV; House of Habsburg (31 March 1621 – 17 September 1665)
1		Antonio Carreño de Valdes 伐爾得斯	1627	1629	Lorenzo de Cárdenas Valda y Zárate; Ad Interim (24 February 1628 – 26 November 1632)	Juan Niño de Tabora (29 June 1626 – 22 July 1632)	Rodrigo Pacheco, 3rd Marquess of Cerralvo (3 November 1624 – 16 September 1635)	Count-Duke of Olivares (25 January 1622 – 23 January 1643)	Philip IV; House of Habsburg (31 March 1621 – 17 September 1665)
2		Luis de Guzmán 格司曼	1629	1634	Lorenzo de Cárdenas Valda y Zárate; Ad Interim (24 February 1628 – 26 November 1632)	Juan Niño de Tabora (29 June 1626 – 22 July 1632)	Rodrigo Pacheco, 3rd Marquess of Cerralvo (3 November 1624 – 16 September 1635)	Count-Duke of Olivares (25 January 1622 – 23 January 1643)	Philip IV; House of Habsburg (31 March 1621 – 17 September 1665)
2		Luis de Guzmán 格司曼	1629	1634	Lorenzo de Cárdenas Valda y Zárate; Ad Interim (24 February 1628 – 26 November 1632)	Lorenzo de Olaza; Real Audiencia (22 July 1632 – 1633)	Rodrigo Pacheco, 3rd Marquess of Cerralvo (3 November 1624 – 16 September 1635)	Count-Duke of Olivares (25 January 1622 – 23 January 1643)	Philip IV; House of Habsburg (31 March 1621 – 17 September 1665)
2		Luis de Guzmán 格司曼	1629	1634	García de Avellaneda y Haro (26 November 1632– 10 November 1653)	Lorenzo de Olaza; Real Audiencia (22 July 1632 – 1633)	Rodrigo Pacheco, 3rd Marquess of Cerralvo (3 November 1624 – 16 September 1635)	Count-Duke of Olivares (25 January 1622 – 23 January 1643)	Philip IV; House of Habsburg (31 March 1621 – 17 September 1665)
2		Luis de Guzmán 格司曼	1629	1634	García de Avellaneda y Haro (26 November 1632– 10 November 1653)	Juan Cerezo de Salamanca; Ad Interim (29 August 1633 – 25 June 1635)	Rodrigo Pacheco, 3rd Marquess of Cerralvo (3 November 1624 – 16 September 1635)	Count-Duke of Olivares (25 January 1622 – 23 January 1643)	Philip IV; House of Habsburg (31 March 1621 – 17 September 1665)
3		Bartolomé Díaz Barrera 奧就	1634	1637	García de Avellaneda y Haro (26 November 1632– 10 November 1653)	Juan Cerezo de Salamanca; Ad Interim (29 August 1633 – 25 June 1635)	Rodrigo Pacheco, 3rd Marquess of Cerralvo (3 November 1624 – 16 September 1635)	Count-Duke of Olivares (25 January 1622 – 23 January 1643)	Philip IV; House of Habsburg (31 March 1621 – 17 September 1665)
3		Bartolomé Díaz Barrera 奧就	1634	1637	García de Avellaneda y Haro (26 November 1632– 10 November 1653)	Sebastián Hurtado de Corcuera(25 June 1635 – 11 August 1644)	Rodrigo Pacheco, 3rd Marquess of Cerralvo (3 November 1624 – 16 September 1635)	Count-Duke of Olivares (25 January 1622 – 23 January 1643)	Philip IV; House of Habsburg (31 March 1621 – 17 September 1665)
3		Bartolomé Díaz Barrera 奧就	1634	1637	García de Avellaneda y Haro (26 November 1632– 10 November 1653)	Sebastián Hurtado de Corcuera(25 June 1635 – 11 August 1644)	Lope Díez de Armendáriz, 1st Marquess of Cadreita (16 September 1635 – 27 August 1640)	Count-Duke of Olivares (25 January 1622 – 23 January 1643)	Philip IV; House of Habsburg (31 March 1621 – 17 September 1665)
4		Francisco Hernández 赫爾南勒茲	1637	1642	García de Avellaneda y Haro (26 November 1632– 10 November 1653)	Sebastián Hurtado de Corcuera(25 June 1635 – 11 August 1644)	Lope Díez de Armendáriz, 1st Marquess of Cadreita (16 September 1635 – 27 August 1640)	Count-Duke of Olivares (25 January 1622 – 23 January 1643)	Philip IV; House of Habsburg (31 March 1621 – 17 September 1665)
4		Francisco Hernández 赫爾南勒茲	1637	1642	García de Avellaneda y Haro (26 November 1632– 10 November 1653)	Sebastián Hurtado de Corcuera(25 June 1635 – 11 August 1644)	Diego López Pacheco, 7th Duke of Escalona (27 August 1640 – 10 June 1642)	Count-Duke of Olivares (25 January 1622 – 23 January 1643)	Philip IV; House of Habsburg (31 March 1621 – 17 September 1665)
4		Francisco Hernández 赫爾南勒茲	1637	1642	García de Avellaneda y Haro (26 November 1632– 10 November 1653)	Sebastián Hurtado de Corcuera(25 June 1635 – 11 August 1644)	Juan de Palafox y Mendoza (10 June – 23 November 1642)	Count-Duke of Olivares (25 January 1622 – 23 January 1643)	Philip IV; House of Habsburg (31 March 1621 – 17 September 1665)

== Kingdom of Tungning (1661–1683) ==
The Southern Ming (Ming dynasty loyalists) came to Taiwan under Koxinga, expelling the Dutch and capturing Fort Zeelandia. They established the Kingdom of Tungning.

Kingdom of Tungning 【東寧王國】
No.	Portrait	Name (Birth–Death)	Title(s)	Reign (Lunar calendar)	
1		Koxinga (Zheng Chenggong) 鄭成功; Zhèng Chénggōng (Mandarin); Tēⁿ Sêng-kong (Taiwanese); Chhang Sṳ̀n-kûng (Hakka) (1624–1662)	Prince of Yanping (延平王); Prince Wu of Chao (潮武王)	14 June 1661; Yongli 15-5-18	23 June 1662; Yongli 16-5-8
2		Zheng Xi 鄭襲; Zhèng Xí (Mandarin); Tēⁿ Si̍p (Taiwanese); Chhang Si̍p (Hakka) (1625–?)	Protector (護理)	23 June 1662; Yongli 16-5-8	November 1662; Yongli 17
3		Zheng Jing 鄭經; Zhèng Jīng (Mandarin); Tēⁿ Keng (Taiwanese); Chhang Kîn (Hakka) (1642–1681)	Prince of Yanping (延平王); Prince Wen of Chao (潮文王)	November 1662; Yongli 17	17 March 1681; Yongli 35-1-28
4		Zheng Kezang 鄭克臧; Zhèng Kèzāng (Mandarin); Tēⁿ Khek-chong (Taiwanese); Chhang Khiet-chong (Hakka) (1662–1681)	Prince Regent (監國)	17 March 1681; Yongli 35-1-28	19 March 1681; Yongli 35-1-30
5		Zheng Keshuang^{*} 鄭克塽; Zhèng Kèshuǎng (Mandarin); Tēⁿ Khek-sóng (Taiwanese); Chhang Khiet-sóng (Hakka) (1670–1707)	Prince of Yanping (延平王); Duke Haicheng (海澄公)	19 March 1681; Yongli 35-1-30	5 September 1683; Yongli 37-8-13

* Regency of Feng Xifan from 1682 to 1683.

== Taiwan under the rule of the Qing Dynasty (1683–1895) ==
=== Taiwan-Amoy Circuit (1683–1721) ===
The Qing dynasty invaded Taiwan; the Ming rulers surrendered and were expelled.

Taiwan-Xiamen Circuit Commissioner (福建分巡台灣廈門道, 1687—1727)

No.	Commissioner	Start of office

=== Taiwan Circuit (1721–1885) ===
Qing rule was reestablished after a month-long revolt. The Taiwan Circuit was established in 1727 with its seat in Taiwan-fu, unlike its predecessor, the Taiwan-Amoy Circuit, which was based in Xiamen. The Taiwan Circuit Commissioner had its powers checked by the Taiwan Circuit Investigating censors.

Taiwan Circuit Commissioner (福建分巡台灣道)

No.	Commissioner	Start of office

Taiwan Circuit Investigating Censor (巡視台灣監察御史)

Start of office	Investigating Censor (Manchu-banner)	No.	No.	Investigating Censor (Han)	Start of office
1722	Aisin Gioro Wudali (PR)	1	1	Huang Shujing	1722
1724	Shanjibu (BB)	2	2	Ding Shiyi	1724
1724	Shanjibu (BB)	2	3	Jing Kaoxiang	1725
1726	Suolin (BR)	3	4	Wang Jijing	1726
1726	Hesuse (PR)	4	4	Wang Jijing	1726
1726	Hesuse (PR)	4	5	Yin Qin	1727
1726	Hesuse (PR)	4	6	Xia Zhifang	1728
1730	Xideshen (PR)	5	7	Li Yuanzhi	1730
1730	Xideshen (PR)	5	8	Gao Shan	1730
1732	Jueluobiaiyou (BR)	6	8	Gao Shan	1730
1732	Jueluobiaiyou (BR)	6	9	Lin Tianmu	1733
1734	Durtai (PY)	7	9	Lin Tianmu	1733
1734	Durtai (PY)	7	10	Yan Ruihong	1735
1736	Bai Qitu (PB)	8	10	Yan Ruihong	1735
1737	Romubu (PB)	9	11	Shan Demo	1737
1737	Romubu (PB)	9	12	Yang Erchou	1739
1740	Shuge (PW)	10	12	Yang Erchou	1739
1740	Shuge (PW)	10	13	Zhang Mei	1741
1742	Shu Shan (BY)	11	13	Zhang Mei	1741
1742	Shu Shan (BY)	11	14	Xiong Xuepeng	1743
1744	Liu Shiqi (BR)	12	14	Xiong Xuepeng	1743
1744	Liu Shiqi (BR)	12	15	Fan Xian	1745
1747	Yiling'a (BB)	13	16	Bai Ying	1747
1749	Shuchang (PY)	14	17	Yang Kaiding	1749
1751	Lizhu (BB)	15	18	Qian Qi	1751
1756	Guanbao (PY)	16	19	Li Youtang	1756
1759	Shilin (PW)	17	20	Tang Shichang	1760
1763	Yongtai (PR)	18	21	Li Yiqing	1763
1767	Mingshan (BY)	19	22	Zhu Pilie	1767
1771	Karchongyi (BW)	20	23	Wang Xianzeng	1771
1777	Tusiyi (BB)	21	24	Meng Shao	1777
1781	Sedai (PR)	22	25	Lei Lun	1781

Taiwan Military Circuit Commissioner (福建分巡臺灣兵備道, 1767-1791)

No.	Commissioner	Start of office

Provincial Censor-ranked Taiwan Military Circuit Commissioner (按察使銜分巡台灣兵備道, 1791-1895)

No.	Commissioner	Start of office

=== Governor of Fukien-Taiwan Province (1885–1895) ===
Great Qing Empire 【大清】
No.	Portrait	Name (Birth–Death)	Ancestry	Original Post	Term of Office (Lunar calendar)		Monarch (Reign)
1		Liu Mingchuan 劉銘傳; Liú Míngchuán (Mandarin); Lâu Bêng-thoân (Taiwanese); Liù Mèn-chhòn (Hakka) (1836–1896)	Hefei, Anhui	Governor of Fukien	12 October 1885; Guangxu 11-9-5	4 June 1891; Guangxu 17-4-28	Guangxu Emperor 光緒皇帝 (25 February 1875 – 14 November 1908)
—		Shen Yingkui 沈應奎; Shěn Yìngkuí (Mandarin); Tîm Èng-khe (Taiwanese); Chhṳ̀m En-khùi (Hakka)	Pinghu, Zhejiang	Civil Affairs Minister, Fukien Province	4 June 1891; Guangxu 17-4-28	25 November 1891; Guangxu 17-10-24	Guangxu Emperor 光緒皇帝 (25 February 1875 – 14 November 1908)
2		Shao Youlian 邵友濂; Shào Yǒulián (Mandarin); Siō Iú-liâm (Taiwanese); Seu Yû-liàm (Hakka) (1840–1901)	Yuyao, Zhejiang	Governor of Hunan	9 May 1891; Guangxu 17-4-2	13 October 1894; Guangxu 20-9-15	Guangxu Emperor 光緒皇帝 (25 February 1875 – 14 November 1908)
3		Tang Jingsong 唐景崧; Táng Jǐngsōng (Mandarin); Tn̂g Kéng-siông (Taiwanese); Thòng Kín-chhiùng (Hakka) (1841–1903)	Guanyang, Guangxi	Civil Affairs Minister, Fukien-Taiwan Province	13 October 1894; Guangxu 20-9-15	20 May 1895; Guangxu 21-4-26	Guangxu Emperor 光緒皇帝 (25 February 1875 – 14 November 1908)

== Republic of Formosa (1895) ==
The Republic of Formosa was a short-lived republic that existed on the island of Taiwan in 1895 between the formal cession of Taiwan by the Qing dynasty of China to the Empire of Japan by the Treaty of Shimonoseki and its being taken over by Japanese troops. The Republic was proclaimed on 23 May 1895 and extinguished on 21 October, when the Republican capital Tainan was taken over by the Japanese.

Republic of Formosa【臺灣民主國】
No.	Portrait	Name (Birth–Death)	Place of birth	Term of Office		Days
1		Tang Ching-sung 唐景崧 Táng Jǐngsōng (Mandarin); Tn̂g Kéng-siông (Taiwanese); Thòng Kín-chhiùng (Hakka) (1841–1903); President	Guilin, Guangxi, China	25 May 1895 Yongqing 1-5-25; Guangxu 21-5-2; Meiji 28-5-25	5 June 1895 Yongqing 1-6-5; Meiji 28-6-5	13
2		Liu Yung-fu 劉永福 Liú Yǒngfú (Mandarin); Lâu Éng-hok (Taiwanese); Liû Yún-fuk (Hakka) (1837–1917); Commander-in-chief	Qinzhou, Guangxi, China	5 June 1895 Yongqing 1-6-5; Meiji 28-6-5	21 October 1895 Yongqing 1-10-21; Meiji 28-10-21	138

== Taiwan under Japanese rule (1895–1945) ==
After the First Sino-Japanese War and establishing control over the island through the Treaty of Shimonoseki, the Japanese Empire used the French Empire model of an occupying force and were instrumental in the industrialization of the island; they built railroads, a sanitation system and a public school educational system, among other things. Around 1935, the Japanese began an island-wide assimilation project to bind the island more firmly to the empire.

In 1941, the Pacific War broke out when the Japanese Empire attacked the U.S. naval port of Pearl Harbor in Hawaii. By 1945, desperate plans were in place to incorporate popular representation of Taiwan into the Imperial Diet to end colonial rule of the island and transfer occupying troops to the front lines to fight the Allies. The names listed here are the Japanese governor-generals:

=== Governors-General of Taiwan (1895–1945) ===
Military Rikken Seiyūkai Kenseikai Rikken Minseitō

Empire of Japan 「大日本帝國」
No.	Portrait	Name	Origin	Occupation	Affiliation	Term of Office		Monarch (Reign)
1		Kabayama Sukenori 樺山資紀	Kagoshima	Admiral (Imperial Japanese Navy) (Viscount)	Military	10 May 1895	2 June 1896	Emperor Meiji 明治天皇 (13 February 1867 – 30 July 1912)
2		Katsura Tarō 桂太郎	Yamaguchi	Lieutenant General (Imperial Japanese Army) (Viscount)	Military	2 June 1896	14 October 1896	Emperor Meiji 明治天皇 (13 February 1867 – 30 July 1912)
3		Nogi Maresuke 乃木希典	Yamaguchi	Lieutenant General (Imperial Japanese Army) (Baron)	Military	14 October 1896	26 February 1898	Emperor Meiji 明治天皇 (13 February 1867 – 30 July 1912)
4		Kodama Gentarō 兒玉源太郎	Yamaguchi	Lieutenant General (Imperial Japanese Army) (Baron)	Military	26 February 1898	11 April 1906	Emperor Meiji 明治天皇 (13 February 1867 – 30 July 1912)
5		Sakuma Samata 佐久間左馬太	Yamaguchi	General (Imperial Japanese Army) (Viscount)	Military	11 April 1906	1 May 1915	Emperor Meiji 明治天皇 (13 February 1867 – 30 July 1912)
5		Sakuma Samata 佐久間左馬太	Yamaguchi	General (Imperial Japanese Army) (Viscount)	Military	11 April 1906	1 May 1915	Emperor Taishō 大正天皇 (30 July 1912 – 25 December 1926)
6		Andō Teibi 安東貞美	Nagano	General (Imperial Japanese Army) (Baron)	Military	1 May 1915	6 June 1918	Emperor Taishō 大正天皇 (30 July 1912 – 25 December 1926)
7		Akashi Motojiro 明石元二郎	Fukuoka	Lieutenant General (Imperial Japanese Army)	Military	6 June 1918	24 October 1919	Emperor Taishō 大正天皇 (30 July 1912 – 25 December 1926)
8		Den Kenjirō 田健治郎	Hyōgo	Member of Terauchi Cabinet (Baron)	Seiyūkai	29 October 1919	6 September 1923	Emperor Taishō 大正天皇 (30 July 1912 – 25 December 1926)
9		Uchida Kakichi 內田嘉吉	Tokyo	Member of House of Peers	Seiyūkai	6 September 1923	1 September 1924	Emperor Taishō 大正天皇 (30 July 1912 – 25 December 1926)
10		Izawa Takio 伊澤多喜男	Nagano	Member of House of Peers	Kenseikai	1 September 1924	16 July 1926	Emperor Taishō 大正天皇 (30 July 1912 – 25 December 1926)
11		Kamiyama Mitsunoshin 上山滿之進	Yamaguchi	literary figure	Kenseikai	16 July 1926	16 June 1928	Emperor Taishō 大正天皇 (30 July 1912 – 25 December 1926)
11		Kamiyama Mitsunoshin 上山滿之進	Yamaguchi	literary figure	Kenseikai	16 July 1926	16 June 1928	Emperor Shōwa 昭和天皇 (25 December 1926 – 7 January 1989)
12		Kawamura Takeji 川村竹治	Akita	Member of House of Peers	Seiyūkai	16 June 1928	30 July 1929	Emperor Shōwa 昭和天皇 (25 December 1926 – 7 January 1989)
13		Ishizuka Eizō 石塚英藏	Fukushima	Member of House of Peers	Minseitō	30 July 1929	16 January 1931	Emperor Shōwa 昭和天皇 (25 December 1926 – 7 January 1989)
14		Ōta Masahiro 太田政弘	Yamagata	Director of Kwantung Leased Territory	Minseitō	16 January 1931	2 March 1932	Emperor Shōwa 昭和天皇 (25 December 1926 – 7 January 1989)
15		Minami Hiroshi 南弘	Toyama	Member of House of Peers	Seiyūkai	2 March 1932	26 May 1932	Emperor Shōwa 昭和天皇 (25 December 1926 – 7 January 1989)
16		Nakagawa Kenzō 中川健蔵	Niigata	Undersecretary of Education	Minseitō	26 May 1932	2 September 1936	Emperor Shōwa 昭和天皇 (25 December 1926 – 7 January 1989)
17		Kobayashi Seizō 小林躋造	Hiroshima	Admiral (Imperial Japanese Navy)	Military	2 September 1936	27 November 1940	Emperor Shōwa 昭和天皇 (25 December 1926 – 7 January 1989)
18		Hasegawa Kiyoshi 長谷川清	Fukui	Admiral (Imperial Japanese Navy)	Military	27 November 1940	30 December 1944	Emperor Shōwa 昭和天皇 (25 December 1926 – 7 January 1989)
19		Andō Rikichi 安藤利吉	Miyagi	General (Imperial Japanese Army)	Military	30 December 1944	25 October 1945	Emperor Shōwa 昭和天皇 (25 December 1926 – 7 January 1989)

== Taiwan under the rule of the Republic of China (1945–present) ==
Following the end of World War II in 1945, under the terms of the Instrument of Surrender of Japan, the control of Taiwan was to be transferred to the Republic of China (ROC). ROC troops were authorized to come to Taiwan to accept the surrender of Japanese military forces and occupy Taiwan on behalf of the Allied Powers in General Order No. 1, issued by Douglas MacArthur, the Supreme Commander of the Allied Powers, on 2 September 1945. ROC troops were later transported to Keelung by the U.S. Navy, and Japanese handed the control of Taiwan to the ROC on 25 October 1945, which began a period of military occupation.

Following its defeat in the Chinese Civil War in 1949, Premier Yan Xishan proclaimed the ROC Government's relocation to Taiwan (where it exists until today), thus replacing the Provincial Chairperson as the highest-ranked executive official on Taiwan. This lasted until March 1950, when Chiang Kai-shek resumed his duties as President in Taipei. However, Japan relinquished sovereignty of Taiwan and Penghu in the Treaty of San Francisco on 28 April 1952, without specifying whom the sovereignty was ceded to. Because the ROC only held Taiwan, Penghu and other nearby islands, the regime remained the internationally recognized government of China with sovereignty throughout mainland China, Tibet Area, Sinkiang and Outer Mongolia until recognition shifted to the People's Republic of China by the United Nations in 1971 and the United States in 1979. After the constitutional amendments in 1991, the president is elected by popular vote among citizens of the Republic of China in the "Free Area of the Republic of China" (area under de facto Republic of China administration), instead of by the National Assembly.

Kuomintang Democratic Progressive Party

=== Governor of Taiwan Province (1945–1949) ===
Republic of China (ROC)【中華民國】
No.	Portrait	Name (Birth–Death)	Term of Office		Political Party
Chief Executive of Taiwan Province
1		Chen Yi 陳儀 (1883-1950)	29 August 1945	22 April 1947	Kuomintang
Chairperson of the Taiwan Provincial Government
1		Wei Tao-ming 魏道明 (1899-1978)	16 May 1947	5 January 1949	Kuomintang
2		Chen Cheng 陳誠 (1897–1965)	5 January 1949	8 December 1949	Kuomintang

=== Presidents of the Executive Yuan of the Republic of China (1949–1950) ===
Republic of China (ROC)【中華民國】- Taiwan
No.	Portrait	Name (Birth–Death)	Term of office		Political party
30		Yan Xishan 閻錫山 (1883–1960)	8 December 1949	1 March 1950	Kuomintang

=== Presidents of the Republic of China (1 March 1950–present) ===
Republic of China (ROC)【中華民國】- Taiwan
No.	Portrait	Name (Birth–Death)	Term of office		Term	Elections (votes / percentages)	Political party	Vice President
Presidents elected by the National Assembly
1		Chiang Kai-shek 蔣中正 (1887–1975)	1 March 1950	20 May 1954	1	—	Kuomintang	Li Zongren (1950–1954); Vacant (1954)
1		Chiang Kai-shek 蔣中正 (1887–1975)	20 May 1954	20 May 1960	2	1954 (1,507 / 96.91%)	Kuomintang	Chen Cheng
1		Chiang Kai-shek 蔣中正 (1887–1975)	20 May 1960	20 May 1966	3	1960 (1,481 / 93.97%)	Kuomintang	Chen Cheng (1960–1965); Vacant (1965-1966)
1		Chiang Kai-shek 蔣中正 (1887–1975)	20 May 1966	20 May 1972	4	1966 (1,405 / 98.60%)	Kuomintang	Yen Chia-kan
1		Chiang Kai-shek 蔣中正 (1887–1975)	20 May 1972	5 April 1975	5	1972 (1,308 / 99.39%)	Kuomintang	Yen Chia-kan
2		Yen Chia-kan 嚴家淦 (1905–1993)	6 April 1975	20 May 1978	5	—	Kuomintang	Vacant
3		Chiang Ching-kuo 蔣經國 (1910–1988)	20 May 1978	20 May 1984	6	1978 (1,184 / 98.34%)	Kuomintang	Hsieh Tung-min
3		Chiang Ching-kuo 蔣經國 (1910–1988)	20 May 1984	13 January 1988	7	1984 (1,012 / 95.11%)	Kuomintang	Lee Teng-hui
4		Lee Teng-hui 李登輝 (1923–2020)	13 January 1988	20 May 1990	7	—	Kuomintang	Vacant
4		Lee Teng-hui 李登輝 (1923–2020)	20 May 1990	20 May 1996	8	1990 (641 / 85.24%)	Kuomintang	Lee Yuan-tsu
Presidents elected by popular vote
4		Lee Teng-hui 李登輝 (1923–2020)	20 May 1996	20 May 2000	9	1996 (5,813,699 / 54.0%)	Kuomintang	Lien Chan
5		Chen Shui-bian 陳水扁 (born 1950)	20 May 2000	20 May 2004	10	2000 (4,977,737 / 39.3%)	Democratic Progressive	Annette Lu
5		Chen Shui-bian 陳水扁 (born 1950)	20 May 2004	20 May 2008	11	2004 (6,446,900 / 50.11%)	Democratic Progressive	Annette Lu
6		Ma Ying-jeou 馬英九 (born 1950)	20 May 2008	20 May 2012	12	2008 (7,658,724 / 58.45%)	Kuomintang	Vincent Siew
6		Ma Ying-jeou 馬英九 (born 1950)	20 May 2012	20 May 2016	13	2012 (6,891,139 / 51.60%)	Kuomintang	Wu Den-yih
7		Tsai Ing-wen 蔡英文 (born 1956)	20 May 2016	20 May 2020	14	2016 (6,894,744 / 56.1%)	Democratic Progressive	Chen Chien-jen
7		Tsai Ing-wen 蔡英文 (born 1956)	20 May 2020	20 May 2024	15	2020 (8,170,231 / 57.13%)	Democratic Progressive	Lai Ching-te
8		Lai Ching-te 賴清德 (born 1959)	20 May 2024	Incumbent	16	2024 (5,586,019 / 40.05%)	Democratic Progressive	Hsiao Bi-khim

== See also ==
- History of the Republic of China
- History of Taiwan
- Taiwan
