= List of vice presidents of the Republic of China =

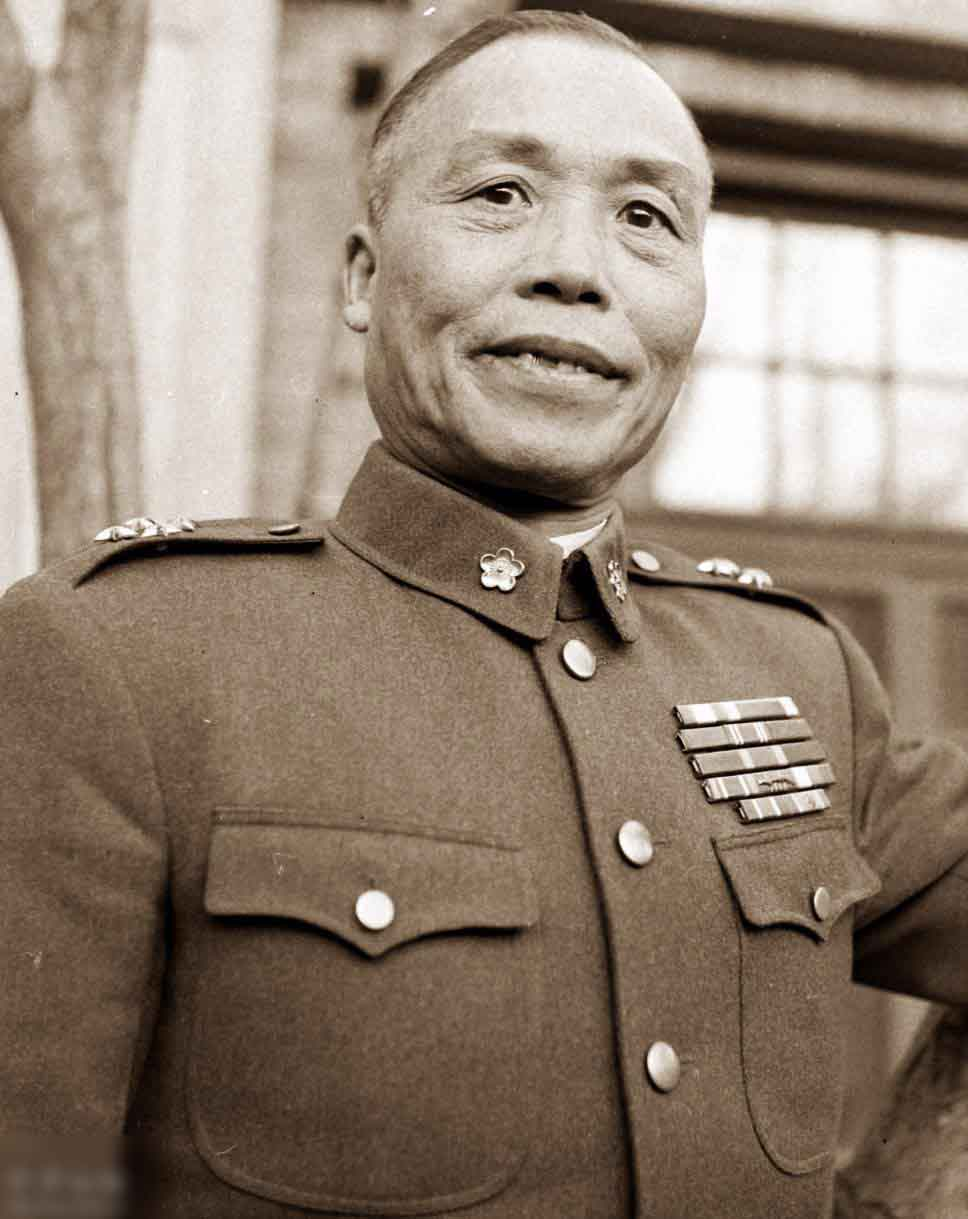
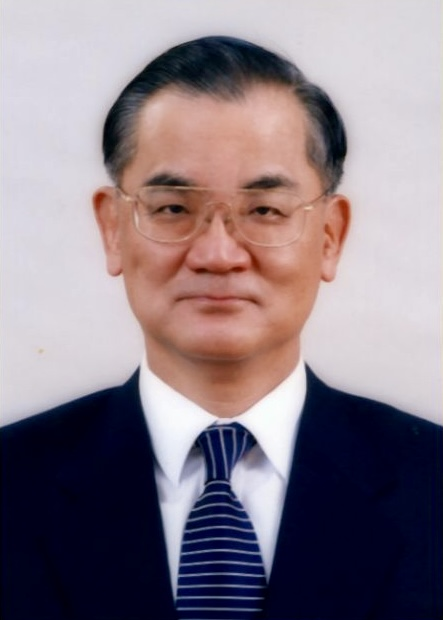
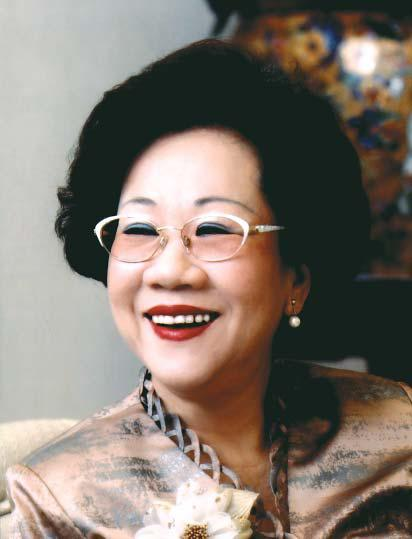
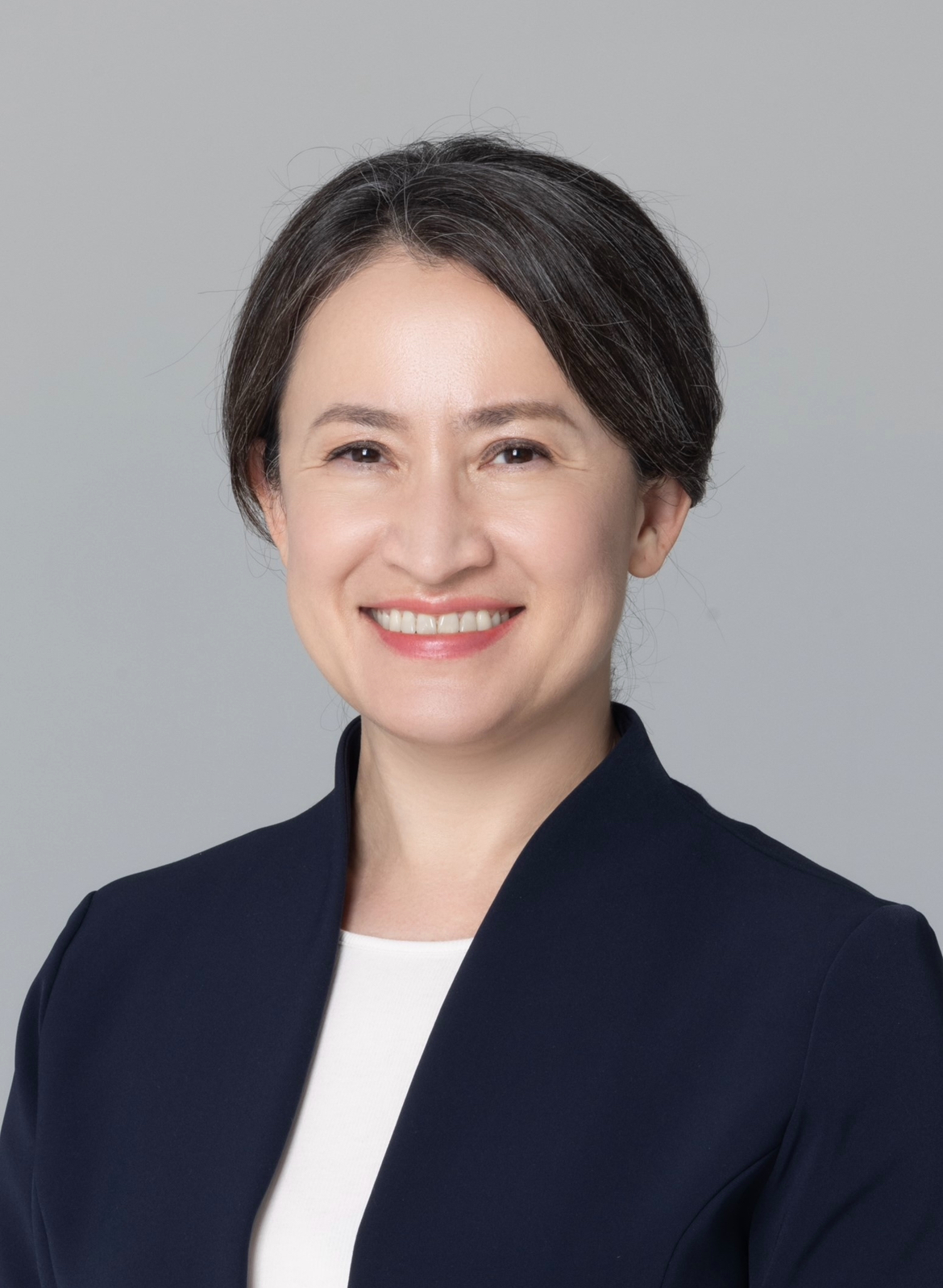
- Top left: Li Zongren was the first vice president under the 1947 Constitution and the only vice president to have acted as president.
- Top right: Lien Chan was the first vice president directly elected by popular vote.
- Bottom left: Annette Lu was the first female vice president and the only individual to have served two full terms in the post.
- Bottom right: Hsiao Bi-khim is the incumbent officeholder and the first biracial vice president.

To avoid confusion, all the names on this list follow the Eastern order convention (family name first, given name second) for consistency.

This is a list of all the vice presidents of the Republic of China (1912–present).

| Name | Chinese | Mandarin Pinyin | Taiwanese Pe̍h-ōe-jī | Hakka Pha̍k-fa-sṳ |
|---|---|---|---|---|
| Vice President | 副總統 | Fùzǒngtǒng | Hù-chóng-thóng | Fu-chúng-thúng |

== List ==
Provisional Government: Tongmenghui Beiyang clique, etc. Independent
Beiyang Government: Beiyang clique, etc. Progressive Party
Constitutional Government: Kuomintang (KMT) Democratic Progressive Party (DPP) Independent

=== Vice presidents of the Provisional Government ===
| № | Portrait | Name (Birth–Death) | Term of office | | Political party | President | Assembly (elected) |
| 1 | | Li Yuanhong 黎元洪 (1864–1928) | 1 January 1912 | 10 October 1913 | Independent | Sun Yat-sen (Tongmenghui) | Provisional (1911) |
| 1 | | Li Yuanhong 黎元洪 (1864–1928) | 1 January 1912 | 10 October 1913 | Independent | Yuan Shikai (Beiyang clique) | Provisional (1912) |
=== Vice presidents of the Beiyang Government ===
| № | Portrait | Name (Birth–Death) | Term of office | | Political party | President | Assembly (elected) |
| 1 | | Li Yuanhong 黎元洪 (1864–1928) | 10 October 1913 | 6 June 1916 | Progressive Party | Yuan Shikai (Beiyang clique) | 1st (1913) |
| 2 | | Feng Guozhang 馮國璋 (1859–1919) | 6 June 1916 | 17 July 1917 | Beiyang clique | Li Yuanhong (Progressive Party) | 1st (1916) |
=== Vice presidents after the 1947 Constitution ===
| № | Portrait | Name (Birth–Death) | Term of office | | Political party | President | Term (elected) |
| 1 | | Li Zongren 李宗仁 (1890–1969) | 20 May 1948 (Note: Acting president from 21 January 1949 to 1 March 1950 on Chiang Kai-shek's declaration of incapacity.) | 12 March 1954 (Note: Vacancy by recall motion.) | Kuomintang | Chiang Kai-shek (Kuomintang) | 1 (1948) |
| Office vacant 12 March – 19 May 1954 | | | | | | Chiang Kai-shek (Kuomintang) | 1 (1948) |
| 2 | | Chen Cheng 陳誠 (1898–1965) | 20 May 1954 | 5 March 1965 (Note: Died in office.) | Kuomintang | Chiang Kai-shek (Kuomintang) | 2 (1954) |
| 2 | | Chen Cheng 陳誠 (1898–1965) | 20 May 1954 | 5 March 1965 | Kuomintang | Chiang Kai-shek (Kuomintang) | 3 (1960) |
| Office vacant 5 March 1965 – 19 May 1966 | | | | | | Chiang Kai-shek (Kuomintang) | 3 (1960) |
| 3 | | Yen Chia-kan (C. K. Yen) 嚴家淦 (1905–1993) | 20 May 1966 | 5 April 1975 | Kuomintang | Chiang Kai-shek (Kuomintang) | 4 (1966) |
| 3 | | Yen Chia-kan (C. K. Yen) 嚴家淦 (1905–1993) | 20 May 1966 | 5 April 1975 | Kuomintang | Chiang Kai-shek (Kuomintang) | 5 (1972) |
| Office vacant 5 April 1975 – 19 May 1978 | | | | | | Yen Chia-kan (Kuomintang) | 5 (1972) |
| 4 | | Hsieh Tung-min 謝東閔 (1908–2001) | 20 May 1978 | 19 May 1984 | Kuomintang | Chiang Ching-kuo (Kuomintang) | 6 (1978) |
| 5 | | Lee Teng-hui 李登輝 (1923–2020) | 20 May 1984 | 13 January 1988 | Kuomintang | Chiang Ching-kuo (Kuomintang) | 7 (1984) |
| Office vacant 13 January 1988 – 19 May 1990 | | | | | | Lee Teng-hui (Kuomintang) | 7 (1984) |
| 6 | | Li Yuan-tsu 李元簇 (1923–2017) | 20 May 1990 | 20 May 1996 | Kuomintang | Lee Teng-hui (Kuomintang) | 8 (1990) |
=== Vice presidents after the introduction of direct election ===
| № | Portrait | Name (Birth–Death) | Term of office | | Political party | President | Term (elected) |
| 7 | | Lien Chan 連戰 (born 1936) | 20 May 1996 | 20 May 2000 | Kuomintang | Lee Teng-hui (Kuomintang) | 9 (1996) |
| 8 | | Annette Lu (Lü Hsiu-lien) 呂秀蓮 (born 1944) | 20 May 2000 | 20 May 2008 | Democratic Progressive | Chen Shui-bian (DPP) | 10 (2000) |
| 8 | | Annette Lu (Lü Hsiu-lien) 呂秀蓮 (born 1944) | 20 May 2000 | 20 May 2008 | Democratic Progressive | Chen Shui-bian (DPP) | 11 (2004) |
| 9 | | Vincent Siew (Siew Wan-chang) 蕭萬長 (born 1939) | 20 May 2008 | 20 May 2012 | Kuomintang | Ma Ying-jeou (Kuomintang) | 12 (2008) |
| 10 | | Wu Den-yih 吳敦義 (born 1948) | 20 May 2012 | 20 May 2016 | Kuomintang | Ma Ying-jeou (Kuomintang) | 13 (2012) |
| 11 | | Chen Chien-jen 陳建仁 (born 1951) | 20 May 2016 | 20 May 2020 | Independent | Tsai Ing-wen (DPP) | 14 (2016) |
| 12 | | Lai Ching-te 賴清德 (born 1959) | 20 May 2020 | 20 May 2024 | Democratic Progressive | Tsai Ing-wen (DPP) | 15 (2020) |
| 13 | | Hsiao Bi-khim 蕭美琴 (born 1971) | 20 May 2024 | Incumbent | Democratic Progressive | Lai Ching-te (DPP) | 16 (2024) |

== Vice presidential age-related data (post-1947 Constitution) ==
| # | Vice President | Born | Age at start of vice presidency | Age at end of vice presidency | Post-vice presidency timespan | Lifespan | |
| # | Vice President | Born | Age at start of vice presidency | Age at end of vice presidency | Post-vice presidency timespan | Died | Age |
|---|---|---|---|---|---|---|---|
| 1 | Li Zongren | Aug 13, 1890 | 57 years, 281 days May 20, 1948 | 63 years, 209 days Mar 10, 1954 | 14 years, 326 days | Jan 30, 1969 | 78 years, 170 days |
| 2 | Chen Cheng | Jan 4, 1898 | 56 years, 136 days May 20, 1954 | 67 years, 60 days Mar 5, 1965 | 0 days | Mar 5, 1965 | 67 years, 60 days |
| 3 | Yen Chia-kan | Oct 23, 1905 | 60 years, 209 days May 20, 1966 | 69 years, 164 days Apr 5, 1975 | 18 years, 263 days | Dec 24, 1993 | 88 years, 62 days |
| 4 | Hsieh Tung-min | Jan 25, 1908 | 70 years, 115 days May 20, 1978 | 76 years, 116 days May 20, 1984 | 16 years, 324 days | Apr 9, 2001 | 93 years, 74 days |
| 5 | Lee Teng-hui | Jan 15, 1923 | 61 years, 126 days May 20, 1984 | 64 years, 363 days Jan 13, 1988 | 32 years, 199 days | Jul 30, 2020 | 97 years, 197 days |
| 6 | Lee Yuan-tsu | Sep 24, 1923 | 66 years, 238 days May 20, 1990 | 72 years, 239 days May 20, 1996 | 20 years, 292 days | Mar 8, 2017 | 93 years, 165 days |
| 7 | Lien Chan | Aug 27, 1936 | 59 years, 267 days May 20, 1996 | 63 years, 267 days May 20, 2000 | 25 years, 314 days | (living) | 89 years, 215 days |
| 8 | Annette Lu | Jun 7, 1944 | 55 years, 348 days May 20, 2000 | 63 years, 348 days May 20, 2008 | 17 years, 314 days | (living) | 81 years, 296 days |
| 9 | Vincent Siew | Jan 3, 1939 | 69 years, 138 days May 20, 2008 | 73 years, 138 days May 20, 2012 | 13 years, 314 days | (living) | 87 years, 86 days |
| 10 | Wu Den-yih | Jan 30, 1948 | 64 years, 111 days May 20, 2012 | 68 years, 111 days May 20, 2016 | 9 years, 314 days | (living) | 78 years, 59 days |
| 11 | Chen Chien-jen | Jun 6, 1951 | 64 years, 349 days May 20, 2016 | 68 years, 349 days May 20, 2020 | 5 years, 314 days | (living) | 74 years, 297 days |
| 12 | Lai Ching-te | Oct 6, 1959 | 60 years, 227 days May 20, 2020 | 64 years, 227 days May 20, 2024 | 1 year, 314 days | (living) | 66 years, 175 days |
| 13 | Hsiao Bi-khim | Aug 7, 1971 | 52 years, 287 days May 20, 2024 | (incumbent) | (incumbent) | (living) | 54 years, 235 days |

=== Oldest living ===
Green text and an asterisk mark the inauguration date of a vice president older than any living ex-vice president. Other dates are the deaths of the then-oldest vice president.

| President | Date range | Age at start | Age at end | Time span |
|---|---|---|---|---|
| Li Zongren | May 20, 1948* – January 30, 1969 | 57 years, 281 days | 78 years, 170 days | 20 years, 255 days |
| Yen Chia-kan | January 30, 1969 – December 24, 1993 | 63 years, 99 days | 88 years, 62 days | 24 years, 328 days |
| Lee Teng-hui | December 24, 1993 – July 30, 2020 | 70 years, 343 days | 97 years, 197 days | 26 years, 219 days |
| Lien Chan | July 30, 2020 – present | 83 years, 338 days | (living) | 5 years, 243 days |

== See also ==
- List of vice presidents of the Republic of China by other offices held
- List of presidents of the Republic of China
- List of premiers of the Republic of China
- List of political office-holders of the Republic of China by age
