= Li Hui-min =

Chinese educator and politician

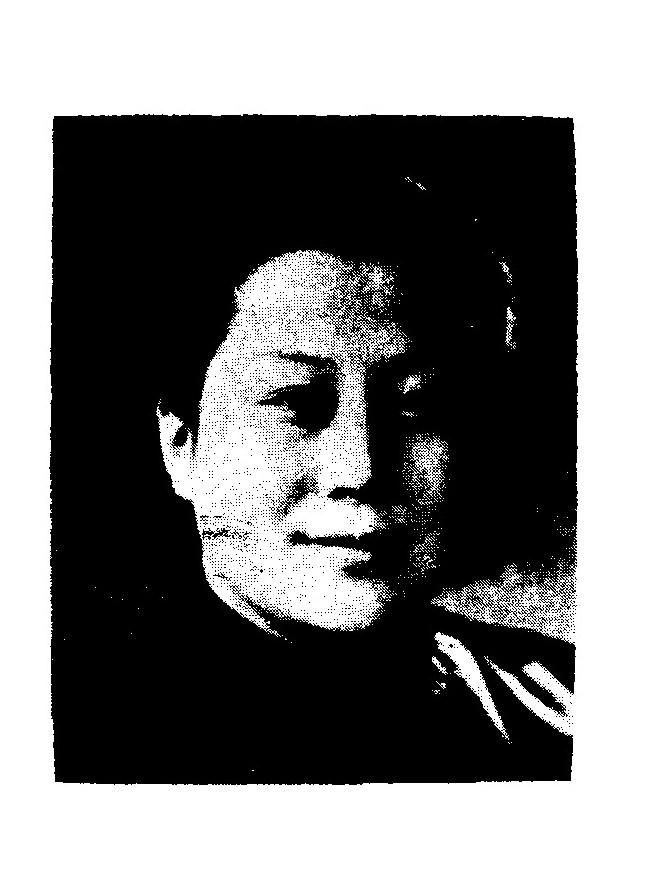
- Li in 1953

Member of the Legislative Yuan
- In office 1948–1987
- Constituency: Jehol

Personal details
- Born: 24 November 1918
- Died: 23 December 1987 (aged 69)

Li Hui-min (Chinese: 李慧民, 24 November 1918 – 23 December 1987) was a Chinese educator and politician. She was one of the first group of women elected to the Legislative Yuan in 1948.

== Biography ==
Originally from Kaifeng in Henan province, Li attended Henan University, where she graduated from the Department of Humanities and History. She subsequently worked as a teacher at Hubei Provincial Badong Middle School and became headteacher of Nanyang County Central Primary School. She later became director of education in Suiyang County of Guizhou Province. Her husband Zhou Shijie was elected to the National Assembly as a representative of universities in 1947. The following year Li was a Kuomintang candidate in Jehol Province in the parliamentary elections, and was elected to the Legislative Yuan. She relocated to Taiwan during the Chinese Civil War and died in 1987.
