= 12th Congress =

12th Congress may refer to:

- 12th Congress of the League of Communists of Yugoslavia (1982)
- 12th Congress of the Philippines (2001–2004)
- 12th Congress of the Russian Communist Party (Bolsheviks) (1923)
- 12th National Congress of the Chinese Communist Party (1982)
- 12th National Congress of the Communist Party of Vietnam (2016)
- 12th National Congress of the Kuomintang (1981)
- 12th National People's Congress (2013–2018)
- 12th United States Congress (1811–1813)
