= List of heads of state and government who suspended the constitution =

The following heads of state and government formally suspended provisions of their state's constitution while in office.

== Suspended in full ==
Name	Country	Year	Reason
Lord North; King George III of Great Britain	Massachusetts	1774	Introduced the Massachusetts Government Act in Parliament rescinding the Massachusetts colonial charter, dissolving the elected legislature, and instituting martial law under the command of General Thomas Gage in retaliation for the Boston Tea Party. Resulted in the Battles of Lexington and Concord beginning the American Revolution and the United States declaring independence from Great Britain.
Antonio López de Santa Anna	Mexico	1835	Abolished the 1824 Federal Constitution and established the Siete Leyes in their place to centralize the government. Constitution restored by José Mariano Salas after Lopez de Santa Anna's resignation after the Mexican–American War.
Henry George Grey, 3rd Earl Grey	New Zealand	1848	The constitution put in place by the Colonial Office in London put all power in the hands of the small settler population. Grey suspended the constitution rather than risk all-out war with the much larger native Māori population.
Charles-Louis Napoléon Bonaparte	France	1851	Abolished the Constitution of 1848 after a self-coup due to constitutional term limits preventing his reelection as President of France. Drafted Constitution of 1852 in its place.
Abdul Hamid II	Ottoman Empire	1878	Used the Russo-Turkish War as a pretext to prorogue the Ottoman General Assembly, suspend the Constitution of 1876, and execute the Constitution's author Midhat Pasha. Later reinstated the Constitution after the Young Turk Revolution in 1908.
Deodoro da Fonseca	Brazil	1889	Suspended the Imperial Constitution of 1823 along with abolishing the Empire of Brazil, overthrowing Emperor Pedro II, and proclaiming a republic.
Miguel Primo de Rivera	Spain	1923	Suspended Constitution of 1876 after leading Spanish Armed Forces coup d'etat.
Alexander I of Yugoslavia	Yugoslavia	1929–1931	An assassination in the National Assembly was used as a pretext for absolutism and the dissolution of the Assembly.
Kimon Georgiev	Bulgaria	1934	Suspended the Tarnovo Constitution after the 1934 Bulgarian coup d'état.
Carol II of Romania	Romania	1938	Suspended the Constitution of 1923 after performing self-coup and taking emergency powers with the assistance of Land Forces officer Ion Gigurtu.
Francisco Franco	Spain	1939–1975	Suspended the Constitution of 1931 after Nationalist victory in Spanish Civil War and promulgated the Fundamental Laws of the Realm in its place.
Ion Antonescu	Romania	1940–1944	Suspended the Constitution of 1938 after King Carol II granted him authoritarian powers. Ruled by decree until King Michael's Coup in 1944.
Chiang Kai-shek Yen Chia-kan; Chiang Ching-kuo	China	1948–1991	Effectively nullified the Constitution of 1948 with the Temporary Provisions against the Communist Rebellion instituting martial law and curtailing civil liberties under the pretext of the Chinese Civil War, the retreat to Taiwan, and the planned recapture of the Mainland. Martial law in Taiwan ended in 1987 under President Chiang Ching-kuo and the Constitution reinstated by the National Assembly in 1991 under President Lee Teng-hui after the abolition of the Kuomintang one-party state.
Fulgencio Batista	Cuba	1952	Suspended Constitution of 1940 after leading coup d'état against the Partido Auténtico government of President Carlos Prío Socarrás due to his poor showing in the forthcoming elections. Fidel Castro of the 26th of July Movement pledged to reinstate the 1940 Constitution in his "History Will Absolve Me" speech during the Cuban Revolution but delayed doing so after overthrowing Batista in 1959 and ultimately drafted the new 1976 Constitution.
Joseph Arthur Ankrah	Ghana	1966	Suspended constitution along with the National Liberation Council after military coup against the government of Kwame Nkrumah.
Jean-Bédel Bokassa	Central African Republic	1966	Suspended constitution during the Saint-Sylvestre coup d'état against the government of Prime Minister David Dacko. Bokassa later created the Central African Empire and declared himself Emperor. Constitution restored after the French military intervention against Bokassa in 1979.
Milton Obote	Uganda	1966	Suspended Parliament and the Constitution after being implicated in a gold smuggling plot with the Deputy Commander of the Uganda People's Defence Force Idi Amin.
Leabua Jonathan	Lesotho	1970	Suspended Constitution in a coup d'état after early results for the 1970 general election showed the ruling Basotho National Party losing to the Basutoland Congress Party.
Libyan Revolutionary Command Council (headed by Muammar Gaddafi)	Libya	1969	Suspended Constitution after coming to power in the 1969 Libyan revolution. Replaced it with an interim constitutional declaration.
Park Chung Hee	South Korea	1972	Suspended the Constitution after nearly losing power in the 1971 presidential election. Issued the Yushin Constitution and placed country under martial law.
Ferdinand Marcos	Philippines	1972-1986	Marcos claimed that a supposed Communist takeover of the government compelled him to suspend the 1935 Constitution and impose martial law. Ratified the 1973 Constitution in its place and won its approval in the Ratification Cases of the Supreme Court until it was abolished in 1986 after his removal from office and subsequent exile.
Augusto Pinochet	Chile	1973–1980	Suspended the Constitution of 1925 after seizing power in a United States-sponsored coup d'état and constructing a military dictatorship. Ratified the Constitution of 1980 in its place.
Sobhuza II	Swaziland	1973	Repealed the Constitution and suspended Parliament, replacing the government with a state of absolute monarchy.
Juan María Bordaberry	Uruguay	1973	Used a Tupamaros general strike as pretext to dissolve the General Assembly and Constitution of 1967, establishing a civic-military dictatorship in its place. Constitution restored by Julio María Sanguinetti after the Colorado Party's electoral victory in the 1984 general election.
Seyni Kountché	Niger	1974	Suspended the Constitution of 1960 and dissolved the National Assembly after a military coup.
Mohammad Zia-ul-Haq	Pakistan	1977–1988	Suspended the Constitution after a military coup.
France-Albert René	Seychelles	1977	Suspended the Constitution after a coup d'état.
Mustafa Ould Salek	Mauritania	1978	Suspended the Constitution after a military coup.
Maurice Bishop	Grenada	1979–1983	The Constitution was suspended after the bloodless ouster of former Prime Minister Eric Gairy, yet some rights protections were simultaneously enacted under The People's Laws 1979. The declared plans for a Constitutional referendum were not carried out prior to Bishop's assassination in October 1983.
Saye Zerbo	Upper Volta	1980	Suspended the Constitution after a military coup.
Jerry Rawlings	Ghana	1981	Suspended the Constitution after a military coup.
Hossain Mohammad Ershad	Bangladesh	1982–1990	Suspended the Constitution after a military coup.
Efraín Ríos Montt	Guatemala	1982	Suspended the Constitution after a military coup.
Lansana Conté	Guinea	1984	Suspended the Constitution after a military coup.
Abdel Rahman Swar al-Dahab	Sudan	1985	Suspended the Constitution after a military coup.
Corazon Aquino	Philippines	1986	Abolished the 1973 constitution that allowed Ferdinand Marcos to impose dictatorship throughout the country and drafted a new constitution in its place after Marcos's removal from office and subsequent exile.
Sitiveni Rabuka	Fiji	1987	Suspended the Constitution during the two consecutive coups d'état.
Pierre Buyoya	Burundi	1987	Suspended the Constitution after a military coup.
Saw Maung; Than Shwe	Myanmar	1988–2008	Suspended the Constitution after crackdown of the 8888 uprising. Ratified a new Constitution in 2008.
Henri Namphy	Haiti	1988	Suspended the Constitution after the June 1988 coup.
Omar Hasan Ahmad al-Bashir	Sudan	1989	Suspended the Constitution after a military coup.
Idriss Déby	Chad	1990	Suspended the Constitution after a military coup.
Amadou Toumani Touré	Mali	1991	Suspended the Constitution after a military coup.
Jorge Serrano Elías	Guatemala	1993	Suspended the Constitution during a constitutional crisis.
Yahya Jammeh	Gambia	1994–2017	Suspended the Constitution after a military coup.
Johnny Paul Koroma	Sierra Leone	1997	Suspended the Constitution after a military coup.
Denis Sassou-Nguesso	Republic of the Congo	1997–2002	According to the United States Department of State: "[T]he Sassou regime [...] announced that a constitutional convention would finalize a draft Constitution. However, the eruption in late 1998 of fighting between Sassou's government forces and a pro-Lissouba and pro-Kolélas armed opposition disrupted the transition to democracy. [...] A new Constitution was [...] approved by the people of Congo in a national referendum in January 2002."
Pervez Musharraf	Pakistan	1999–2007	See 1999 Pakistani coup d'état
Frank Bainimarama	Fiji	2000	See 2000 Fijian coup d'état
Pedro Carmona	Venezuela	2002	See 2002 Venezuelan coup d'état attempt
Gyanendra	Nepal	2005	Suspended the Constitution after a coup d'état.
Sonthi Boonyaratglin	Thailand	2006	Suspended the Constitution after a military coup.
Josefa Iloilo	Fiji	2009	Suspended the Constitution during a constitutional crisis.
Supreme Council of the Armed Forces (headed by Mohamed Hussein Tantawi)	Egypt	2011–2012	Suspended the Constitution of 1971 during the 2011 Egyptian revolution.
Prayut Chan-o-cha	Thailand	2014–2019	Suspended the Constitution after a military coup.
Transitional Military Council (headed by Ahmed Awad Ibn Auf)	Sudan	2019–present	Suspended the Constitution after a military coup.
Min Aung Hlaing	Myanmar	2021–present	Suspended the Constitution after a military coup.

== Suspended in part ==
Name	Country	Year	Reason
Adolf Hitler	Nazi Germany	1933–1945	Pressured the Reichstag into ratifying the Enabling Act allowing legislative authority after the Reichstag fire. Abrogated the Weimar Constitution without officially suspending it.
Omar Ali Saifuddien III	Brunei	1962	
Idi Amin	Uganda	1971	Partially suspended constitution one week after taking power in a coup d'état.
Sheikh Mujibur Rahman	Bangladesh	1975	Declared himself president for life.
Indira Gandhi	India	1975–1977	See Indian Emergency. Disputed: This was done per provision(s) (Article 352) of the Indian Constitution, which then permitted the declaration of Emergency on the grounds of 'internal disturbance'. Later, the reasoning provided has been challenged as being dubious. The grounds for declaration of emergency under Article 352 was amended in 1978 from 'internal disturbance' to 'armed rebellion'.
Alberto Fujimori	Peru	1992–1993	After performing self-coup, Fujimori declared that "those parts of the Constitution that were not compatible with the reorganization of the central government" were suspended.
Omar Hassan Ahmad al-Bashir	Sudan	1989–2019	Partially suspended Constitution after seizing power in a coup d'état.
Pedro Sánchez	Spain	2020–2021	During the COVID-19 pandemic, the Spanish government declared the state of alarm, which effectively suspended some constitutional rights, like the freedom of movement. Later, it was declared unconstitutional by the Constitutional Court of Spain.
Kais Saied	Tunisia	2021–present	Suspended most of the Constitution after he seized governing powers, dismissed the prime minister and suspended the elected parliament.
Nayib Bukele	El Salvador	2022–present	Suspended parts of the constitution during the Salvadoran gang crackdown.

== See also ==
- Constitutionalism
- Constitutional economics
- Rule according to higher law
- Temporary Provisions against the Communist Rebellion
