= 1990 Taiwanese presidential election =

- March 21, 1990
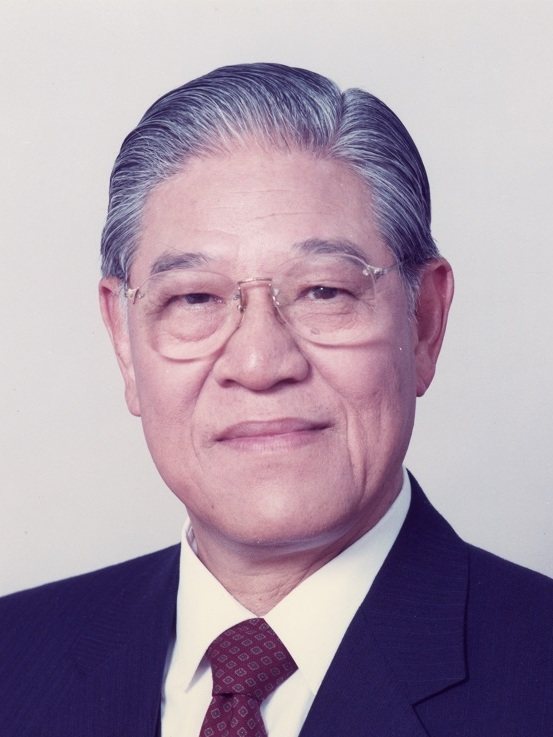
Nominee	Lee Teng-hui
Party	KMT
Running mate	Lee Yuan-tsu
Electoral vote	641
Percentage	100.00%
President before election
Lee Teng-hui
KMT
Elected President
Lee Teng-hui
KMT

Indirect elections were held for the presidency and vice-presidency of the government of the Republic of China on Taiwan on March 21, 1990. The vote took place at the Chung-Shan Building in Yangmingshan, Taipei. Incumbent President Lee Teng-hui was elected, with Secretary-General to the President Lee Yuan-tsu as the Vice President. It was the last indirect presidential election in Taiwan.

== Overview ==
Incumbent president Lee Teng-hui served as vice president under Chiang Ching-kuo before he succeeded Chiang, who died in office in 1988. After Chiang's death, the struggle between different factions in the Kuomintang surfaced for Chiang's successor. While Lee Teng-hui and Lee Yuan-tsu received nominations from the party in February 1990, a ticket of Lin Yang-kang and Chiang Wei-kuo was also pushed forward by the other factions until Lin decided not to run on March 9.

The main opposition party, the Democratic Progressive Party, launched a campaign for the direct election of the president, illegally nominating activist Huang Hua as their presidential candidate. The Wild Lily student movement led by National Taiwan University students also called for direct elections of the president and vice president and new popular elections for all representatives in the National Assembly. After the election, Lee abolished the Temporary Provisions against the Communist Rebellion and pushed for the full democratization.

== Electors ==
The election was conducted by the National Assembly in its meeting place Chung-Shan Building in Yangmingshan, Taipei. According to the Temporary Provisions against the Communist Rebellion, National Assembly delegates elected in the following elections were eligible to vote:

- 1947 Chinese National Assembly election,
- 1969 Taiwanese legislative election, and
- 1986 Taiwanese legislative election.

In total, there were 738 delegates reported to the secretariat to attend this eighth session of the first National Assembly.

== Vote summary ==
=== Presidential election ===
Candidate	Party	Votes	%
Lee Teng-hui	Kuomintang	641	100.00
Total		641	100.00
Valid votes		641	95.96
Invalid/blank votes		27	4.04
Total votes		668	100.00
Registered voters/turnout		738	90.51
Source: Schafferer

=== Vice-presidential election ===
Candidate	Party	Votes	%
Lee Yuan-tsu	Kuomintang	602	100.00
Total		602	100.00
Valid votes		602	93.77
Invalid/blank votes		40	6.23
Total votes		642	100.00
Registered voters/turnout		738	86.99
Source: Schafferer

== See also ==
- History of Republic of China
- President of the Republic of China
- Vice President of the Republic of China
