= 1984 Taiwanese presidential election =

- March 21, 1984
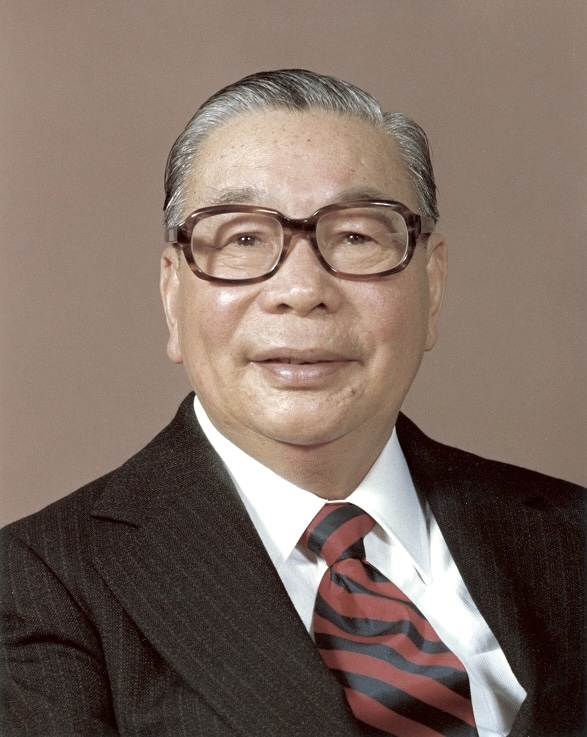
| Nominee | Chiang Ching-kuo |
| Party | KMT |
| Running mate | Lee Teng-hui |
| Electoral vote | 1,012 |
| Percentage | 100.00% |
President before election
Chiang Ching-kuo
KMT
Elected President
Chiang Ching-kuo
KMT

Indirect elections were held for the presidency and vice-presidency of the government of the Republic of China on Taiwan on March 21, 1984. The vote took place at the Chung-Shan Building in Yangmingshan, Taipei. Incumbent President Chiang Ching-kuo was re-elected for the second term with Governor of Taiwan Province Lee Teng-hui as the Vice President.

Incumbent Vice-president Hsieh Tung-min decided not to seek for his second term due to old age. The then Governor of Taiwan Province Lee Teng-hui, also a Taiwan-born Kuomintang member, was picked Chiang's running-mate. Chiang died in office on January 13, 1988. Vice President Lee Teng-hui then sworn in as the President.

== Electors ==
The election was conducted by the National Assembly in its meeting place Chung-Shan Building in Yangmingshan, Taipei. According to the Temporary Provisions against the Communist Rebellion, National Assembly delegates elected in the following elections were eligible to vote:

- 1947 Chinese National Assembly election,
- 1969 Taiwanese legislative election, and
- 1980 Taiwanese legislative election.

In total, there were 1,036 delegates reported to the secretariat to attend this seventh session of the first National Assembly.

== Vote summary ==
=== Presidential election ===
| Candidate | Party | Votes | % |
|---|---|---|---|
| Chiang Ching-kuo | Kuomintang | 1,012 | 100.00 |
| Total | | 1,012 | 100.00 |
| Valid votes | | 1,012 | 99.22 |
| Invalid/blank votes | | 8 | 0.78 |
| Total votes | | 1,020 | 100.00 |
| Registered voters/turnout | | 1,036 | 98.46 |
Source: Schafferer

=== Vice-presidential election ===
| Candidate | Party | Votes | % |
|---|---|---|---|
| Lee Teng-hui | Kuomintang | 873 | 100.00 |
| Total | | 873 | 100.00 |
| Valid votes | | 873 | 87.39 |
| Invalid/blank votes | | 126 | 12.61 |
| Total votes | | 999 | 100.00 |
| Registered voters/turnout | | 1,036 | 96.43 |
Source: Schafferer

== See also ==
- History of Republic of China
- President of the Republic of China
- Vice President of the Republic of China
