= 1978 Taiwanese presidential election =

- March 21, 1978
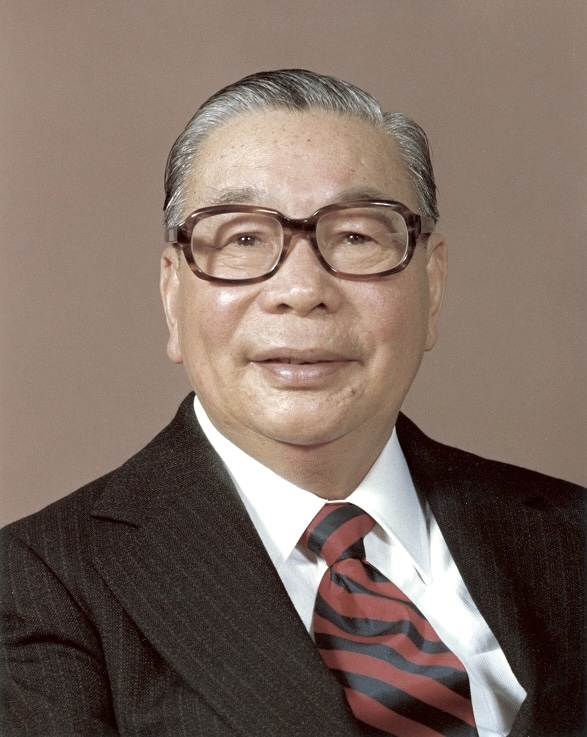
Nominee	Chiang Ching-kuo
Party	KMT
Running mate	Hsieh Tung-min
Electoral vote	1,184
Percentage	100.00%
President before election
Yen Chia-kan
KMT
Elected President
Chiang Ching-kuo
KMT

Indirect elections were held for the presidency and vice-presidency of the government of the Republic of China on Taiwan on March 21, 1978. The vote took place at the Chung-Shan Building in Yangmingshan, Taipei. Premier Chiang Ching-kuo, son of former President Chiang Kai-shek, was elected as the President with Governor of Taiwan Province Hsieh Tung-min who became the first Taiwan-born Vice President.

Incumbent Yen Chia-kan, who rose to the presidency after the death of Chiang Kai-shek, chose not to seek re-election and called on the National Assembly to support Chiang Ching-kuo, the son of Chiang Kai-shek and the then-premier and Chairman of the Kuomintang.

== Electors ==
The election was conducted by the National Assembly in its meeting place Chung-Shan Building in Yangmingshan, Taipei. According to the Temporary Provisions against the Communist Rebellion, National Assembly delegates elected in the following elections were eligible to vote:

- 1947 Chinese National Assembly election,
- 1969 Taiwanese legislative election, and
- 1972 Taiwanese legislative election.

In total, there were 1,220 delegates reported to the secretariat to attend this sixth session of the first National Assembly.

== Results ==
=== President ===
Candidate	Party	Votes	%
Chiang Ching-kuo	Kuomintang	1,184	100.00
Total		1,184	100.00
Valid votes		1,184	98.34
Invalid/blank votes		20	1.66
Total votes		1,204	100.00
Registered voters/turnout		1,220	98.69
Source: Schafferer

=== Vice president ===
Candidate	Party	Votes	%
Hsieh Tung-min	Kuomintang	941	100.00
Total		941	100.00
Valid votes		941	79.14
Invalid/blank votes		248	20.86
Total votes		1,189	100.00
Registered voters/turnout		1,220	97.46
Source: Schafferer

== See also ==
- History of Republic of China
- President of the Republic of China
- Vice President of the Republic of China
