= 1947 Chinese National Assembly election =

- 21–23 November 1947

All 3,045 seats in the National Assembly
- Registered: ≈250,000,000
- Turnout: ≈4-8%
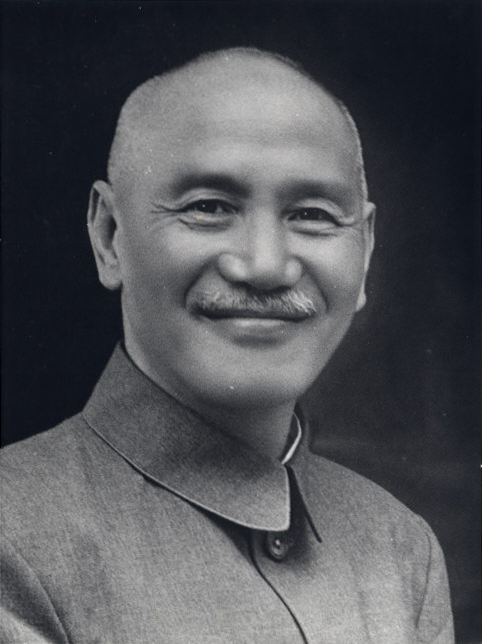

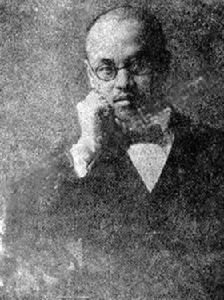

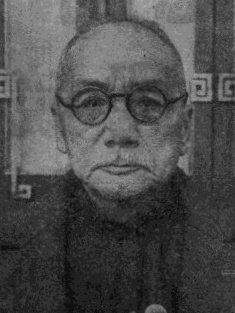
	First party	Second party	Third party
Leader	Chiang Kai-shek	Tseng Chi	Hsu Fu-lin
Party	KMT	Youth	Democratic Socialist
Seats won	> 2,000	76	68

National Assembly elections were held between 21 and 23 November 1947 in China. They were the first elections under the newly ratified 1947 constitution. Under this constitution, the National Assembly was a constitutional convention and presidential electoral college. A total of 2,961 delegates were elected from across the country.

== Background ==
Following the establishment of Republic of China, indirect elections were held in 1912 and 1918 for the National Assembly, 1931 for the Nationals Assembly (Chinese: 國民會議) and 1936 for National Constituent Assembly.

In December 1946, the Constituent Assembly adopted the new Constitution, effective from 25 December 1947. Delegates for National Assembly shall be elected before the constitution came into effect, which would be similar to Electoral College in the United States. In April 1947, China Democratic Socialist Party and Chinese Youth Party entered the re-organised Nationalist government. The two minority parties demanded to field 238 and 288 candidates in the election, despite significantly higher than their representations in the Constitutional Assembly. They also proposed the proportional representation in the election and was rejected. John Leighton Stuart, Ambassador of the United States to China, criticised the minority of their greed for power. He later recommended postponing the election as it could endanger peace negotiation of civil war, but Chiang insisted the election as the key step for constitutional governance.

Elected government officials under the 1947 Constitution of the Republic of China
Title	Role	Constitutional provisions	Amended provisions	First election
National Assembly delegate	Exercise political powers on behalf of citizens	Directly elected by citizens of county-level divisions	Institution de facto suspended, with its powers transferred to the Legislative Yuan and referendums	1947 Chinese National Assembly election
President	Head of state	Indirectly elected by the National Assembly	Directly elected by the citizens within the Free area	1948 Chinese presidential election
Legislative Yuan members	Legislature	Directly elected by citizens of provincial-level divisions	Directly elected by the citizens within the Free area	1948 Chinese legislative election
Control Yuan members	Monitoring authority	Indirectly elected by provincial legislatures	Parliamentary chamber de facto suspended. Appointed by the President and confirmed by the Legislative Yuan	1947–1948 Chinese control election

== Overview, criticism, reactions ==
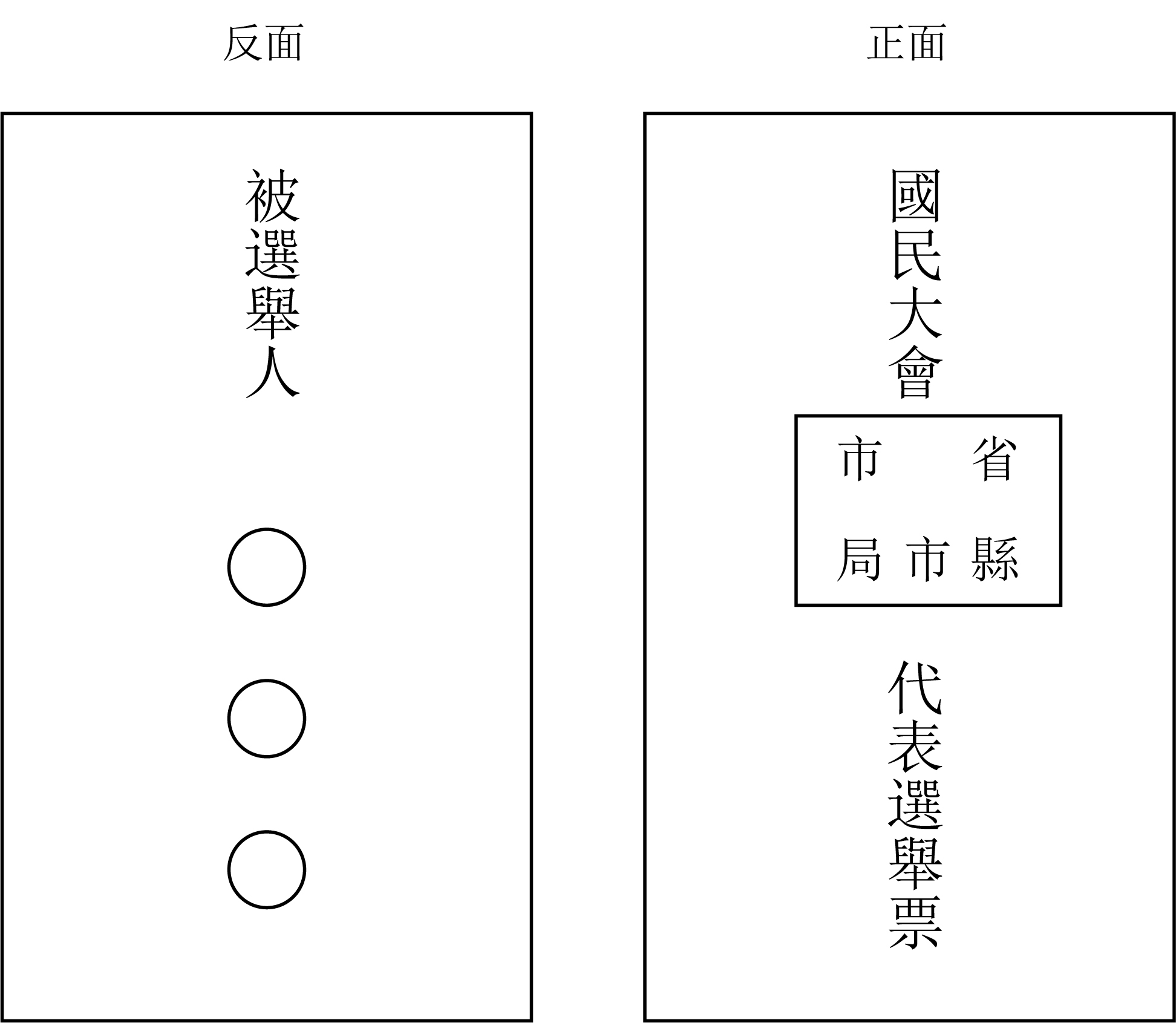
Ballot for election, with "Delegates of National Assembly election ballot" at the front and "Nominees" at the back

The election was held between 21 and 23 November 1947 across China. Single non-transferable vote was used as the electoral system. With an empty ballot, voters were required to write down the name of the candidates voting for. Along with underdeveloped voter identification system, large number of invalid ballots were found and fraud was widely reported.

The election received mixed reaction within China, with some praising the expansion of voting rights to women and farmers while denouncing the election as lacking other essential elements of democracy, but still general appreciation internationally. Ambassador Stuart commented that, despite the unsatisfactory conditions of the election, the election marked the start of democracy in China.

== Results ==
=== Turnout ===
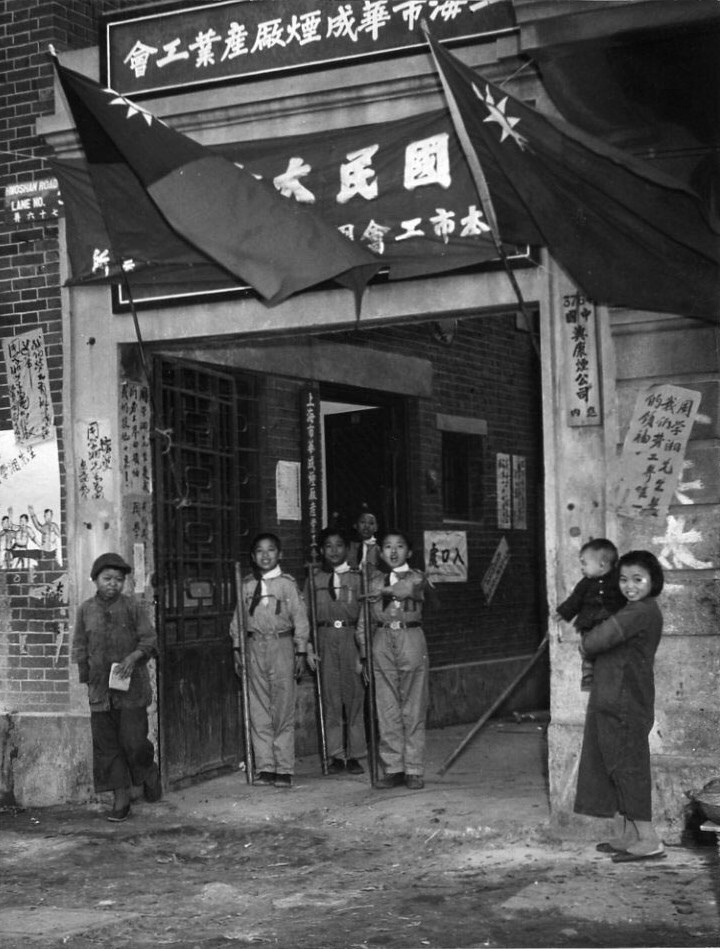
Scouts outside a polling booth in Shanghai

According to Central News Agency, the official broadcaster, and Ta Kung Pao, there were around 250 million of eligible voters, compared to a total population of 461 million. Official newspaper Central Daily News, however, gave the number of voters at 350 million. The Government reported the turnout at 20 million, despite neutral observers doubted whether the total reached 10 million. With the government reported figures, the turnout was at 8%.

Seats won by each party: Kuomintang: 2901 seats Youth Party: 76 seats Democratic Socialist: 68 seats

Elections could not be organised or could partly conducted in provinces or cities occupied or controlled by the Chinese Communist Party or Soviet forces, such as Dairen, Tsitsihar, Harbin, Lyushun, affecting around 800 to 900 constituencies as per government report. Turnout in cities was higher than rural area, with more than half of voters casting ballots in Canton. Overseas voting were met with legal obstacles relating to nationality, especially in the United Kingdom and the colonies, but the electoral procedures in the United States were carried out quite successful as dual citizenships were permitted.

=== Seats breakdown ===
In principle, the electoral districts were designed to elect one delegate for each county or equivalent of China. China recognized the result of the 1945 Mongolian independence referendum, hence this election was only held in the Mongolian leagues and banners within provinces of China, or roughly the territory of modern Inner Mongolia. The Tibetan electoral districts includes the Tibet Area as well as the Tibetan regions within provinces of China. Most of Tibet were controlled by the semi-independent Kashag government at this time.

Seats of the 1947 Chinese National Assembly
Electoral district type		Seats	Delegates	
Electoral district type		Seats	elected	not elected
Counties, cities, and equivalents		2,177	2,141	36
Inner Mongolia		57	57	0
Tibet		40	39	1
Minority ethnic groups in frontier area		34	34	0
Overseas Chinese		65	22	43
Occupational groups	Regional	216	216	0
Occupational groups	Nationwide	271	268	3
Women groups	Regional	148	147	1
Women groups	Nationwide	20	20	0
Nationals in China proper with special convention		17	17	0
Total		3,045	2,961	84

=== Party breakdown ===
The opposition parties urged Kuomintang to ensure the quota of elected delegates be reached prior to the election, reportedly at 230 and 202 for the Youth and Democratic Socialist respectively. Kuomintang is suggested to have won "in landslide", taking at least 80% of legislative seats, equivalent to more than 2,000 seats in National Assembly. Many Kuomintang-nominated candidates, however, still lost in the election, while party members nominated by voters won. Kuomintang later passed a controversial and unconstitutional resolution, forcing those elected delegates with KMT affiliation to give up their seats such as to fulfill the demand from the opposition, as they threatened to withdraw from the National Assembly in protest. The chaos following the resolution forced the meeting to postpone from 25 December 1947 to 29 March 1948, and only ended as it was declared seats would not needed to be given up.

Due to the lack of data over the political affiliation of elected delegates, the numbers below were estimations from the given details.

Political party	Standing	Elected
Kuomintang	1,758	More than 2,000
Chinese Youth Party	288	76
China Democratic Socialist Party	238	68
Independents	?	?
Total	?	2,961

=== Results in Taiwan ===
The islands of Taiwan and Penghu were under Japanese rule before 15 August 1945. Before World War II, few Taiwanese people were selected by the Government of Japan to participate the Imperial Diet. As a result of World War II, the Republic of China restored sovereignty over Taiwan on behalf of the Allies. The government established Taiwan Province to mark the Retrocession of Taiwan.

The administrative divisions of Taiwan consist of 8 counties and 9 cities. However, an additional delegate seat were added to Taichung County and Tainan County respectively due to their population. There were 19 delegates elected in this election.

Party	Votes	%	Seats
Valid votes	1,925,739	98.29	19
Invalid/blank votes	33,415	1.70	–
Total	1,959,154	100	19
Source: Nohlen et al.

== Aftermath ==
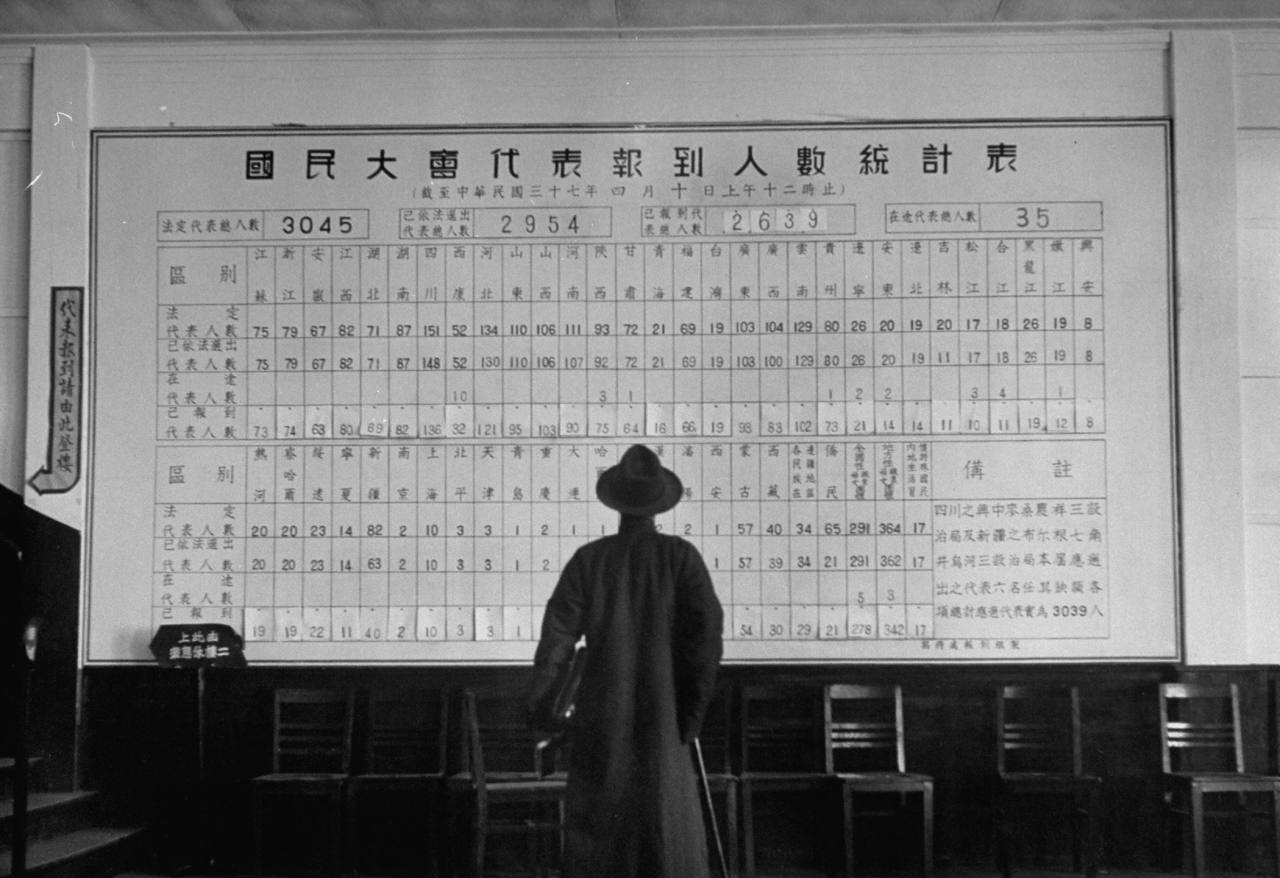
Statistical table on number of National Assembly delegates reporting attendance

The election was organized by the Kuomintang-led Nationalist government. Elected National Assembly delegates started its first session on 29 March 1948 in Nanking. The exact number of delegates attending the meeting remained unknown due to numerous circumstances, such as deaths before or after election, declined to inaugurate, resigned after the first meeting, or disqualified for law offenses. Records showed 2,859, among 2,961 elected, reported the attendance in the opening of the National Assembly first meeting. The number of attendees increased to 2,878 when the meeting reached the end on 1 May 1948.

The inauguration of the first National Assembly marks the transition of China into constitutional governance. Chiang Kai-shek, the leader of the Nationalist government, was elected by the National Assembly delegates in the later presidential election to be the first President of the Republic of China in the constitutional government.

However, the Kuomintang-led Government of the Republic of China lost the Chinese Civil War in the next year of 1949. This resulted the government to retreat to Taiwan. Around half of the National Assembly delegates came to Taiwan with the government. Since the government had lost control over mainland China, the delegates extended their own terms until "re-election is possible in their original electoral district." This situation remained until a Constitutional Court (Judicial Yuan) decision in June 1991 that orders the terms to terminate by the end of 1991.

The National Assembly delegates elected actually served in office from 29 March 1948 to 31 December 1991, which equals 43 years and 278 days.

== Related elections ==
=== Previous and next legislative elections ===
There were some regime changes happened in China during the first half of the 20th century. Depends on the definition, possible previous and next elections for legislatures with similar functions are listed below.

Order	Election	Political entity	Note
Previous	1918 Chinese National Assembly election	Republic of China (1912–1949)	Elected the 2nd National Assembly under the Beiyang government
Next	1st National People's Congress	People's Republic of China	Elected the 1st National People's Congress
Next	1969 Taiwanese legislative election	Republic of China (on Taiwan)	Elected supplementary delegates served together with the 1st National Assembly
Next	1991 Taiwanese National Assembly election	Republic of China (on Taiwan)	Elected new delegates to form the 2nd National Assembly

=== Presidential elections in National Assembly ===
The government of the Republic of China claims the sovereignty over the whole China. However, due to the inability to hold re-elections in mainland China after 1949, the National Assembly delegates elected in 1947 still held elections in Taiwan to elect the President and Vice President every 6 years in accordance with the constitution. This situation remained until the democratization took place in Taiwan in the 1990s under the Lee Teng-hui administration.

Presidential elections by the National Assembly delegates elected in 1947
Order	Presidential Election	Voting delegates	President	Vice President
1st	1948 Chinese presidential election	1947	Chiang Kai-shek	Li Tsung-jen
2nd	1954 Taiwanese presidential election	1947	Chiang Kai-shek	Chen Cheng
3rd	1960 Taiwanese presidential election	1947	Chiang Kai-shek	Chen Cheng
4th	1966 Taiwanese presidential election	1947	Chiang Kai-shek	Yen Chia-kan
5th	1972 Taiwanese presidential election	1947, 1969	Chiang Kai-shek	Yen Chia-kan
6th	1978 Taiwanese presidential election	1947, 1969, 1972	Chiang Ching-kuo	Hsieh Tung-min
7th	1984 Taiwanese presidential election	1947, 1969, 1980	Chiang Ching-kuo	Lee Teng-hui
8th	1990 Taiwanese presidential election	1947, 1969, 1986	Lee Teng-hui	Lee Yuan-tsu

== Gallery ==
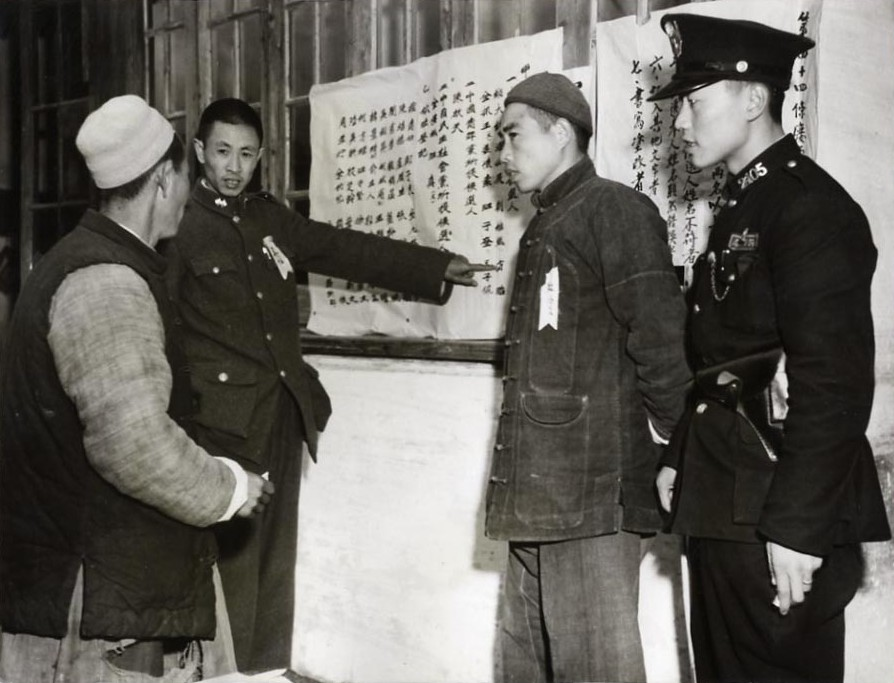
Officials were explaining the voting regulations

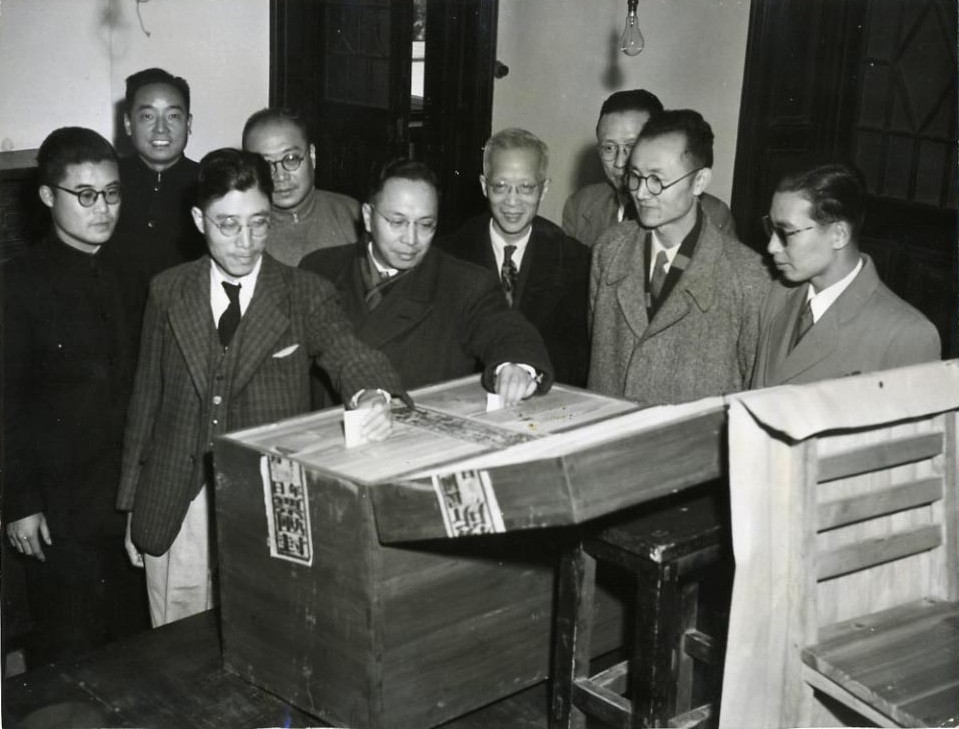
Professors from Chiao Tung University were casting ballots

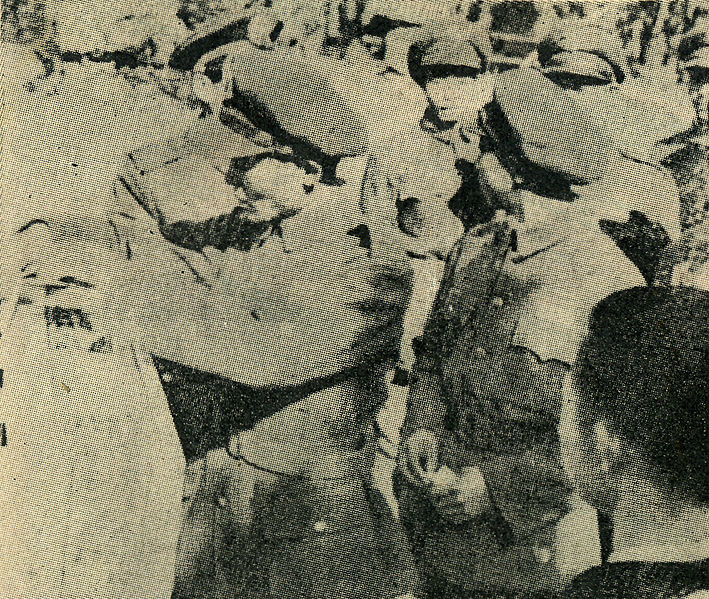
Armed forces in Nanking were voting

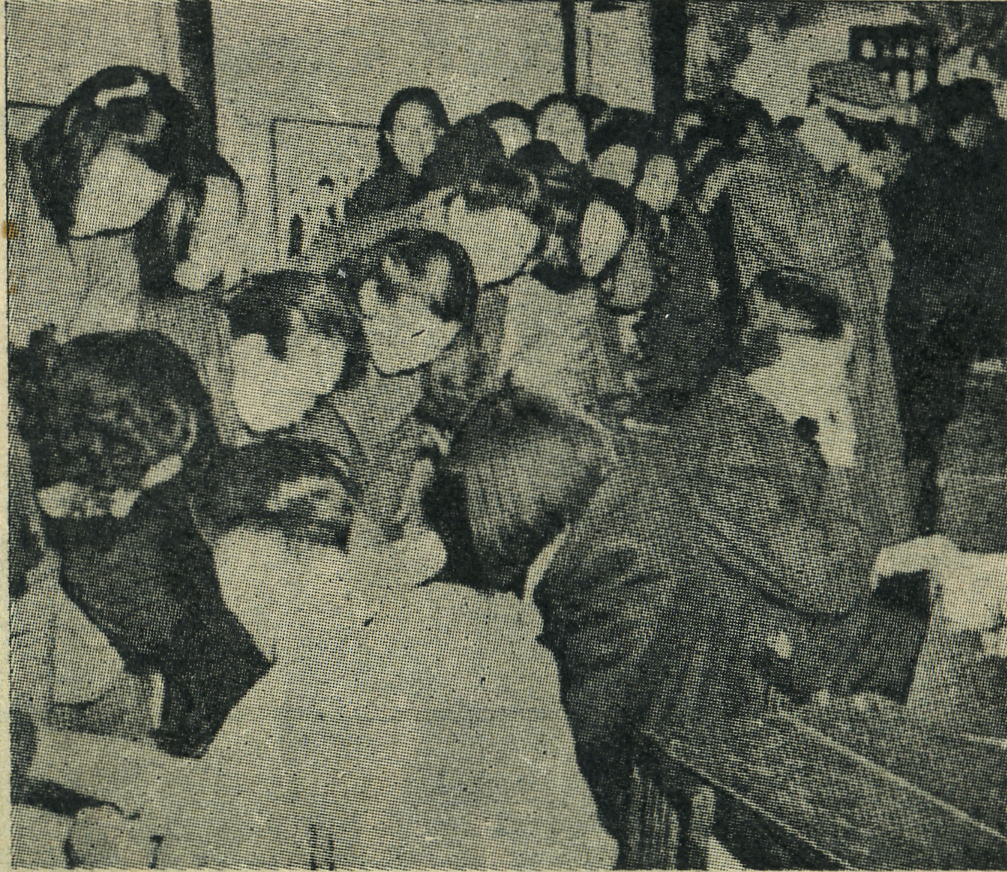
Voters voting in the first direct election

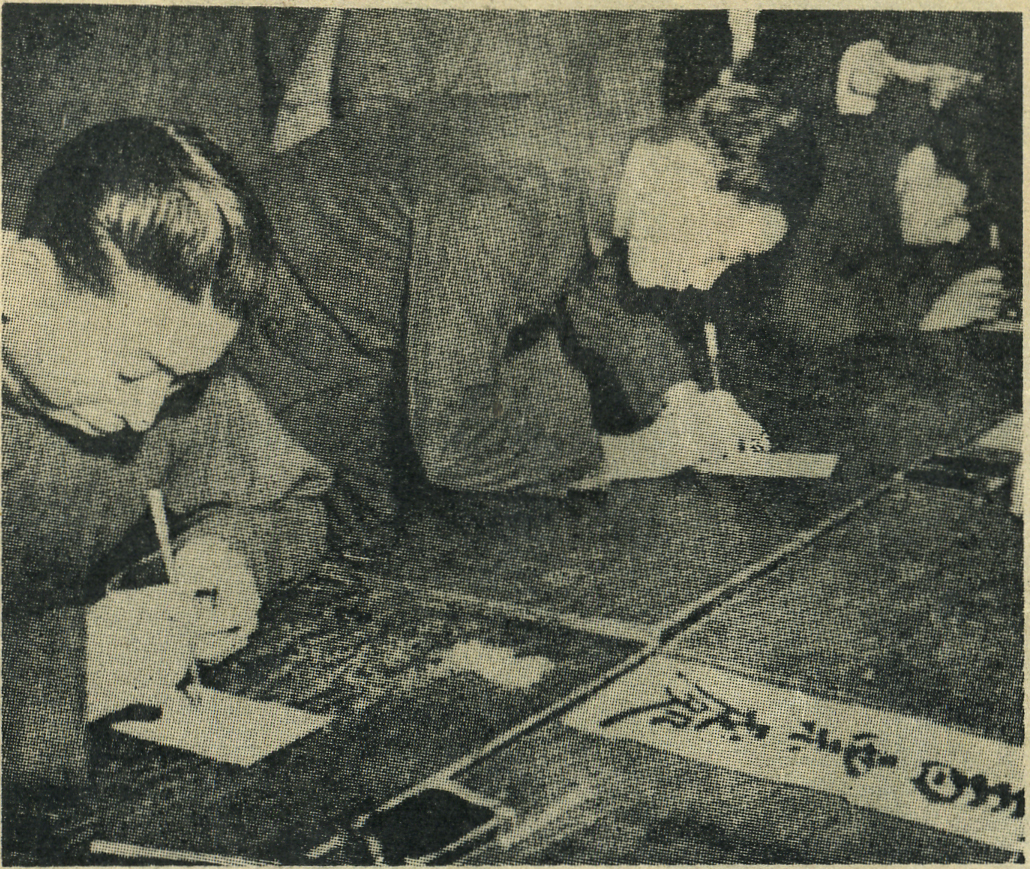
Voters voting in the first direct election

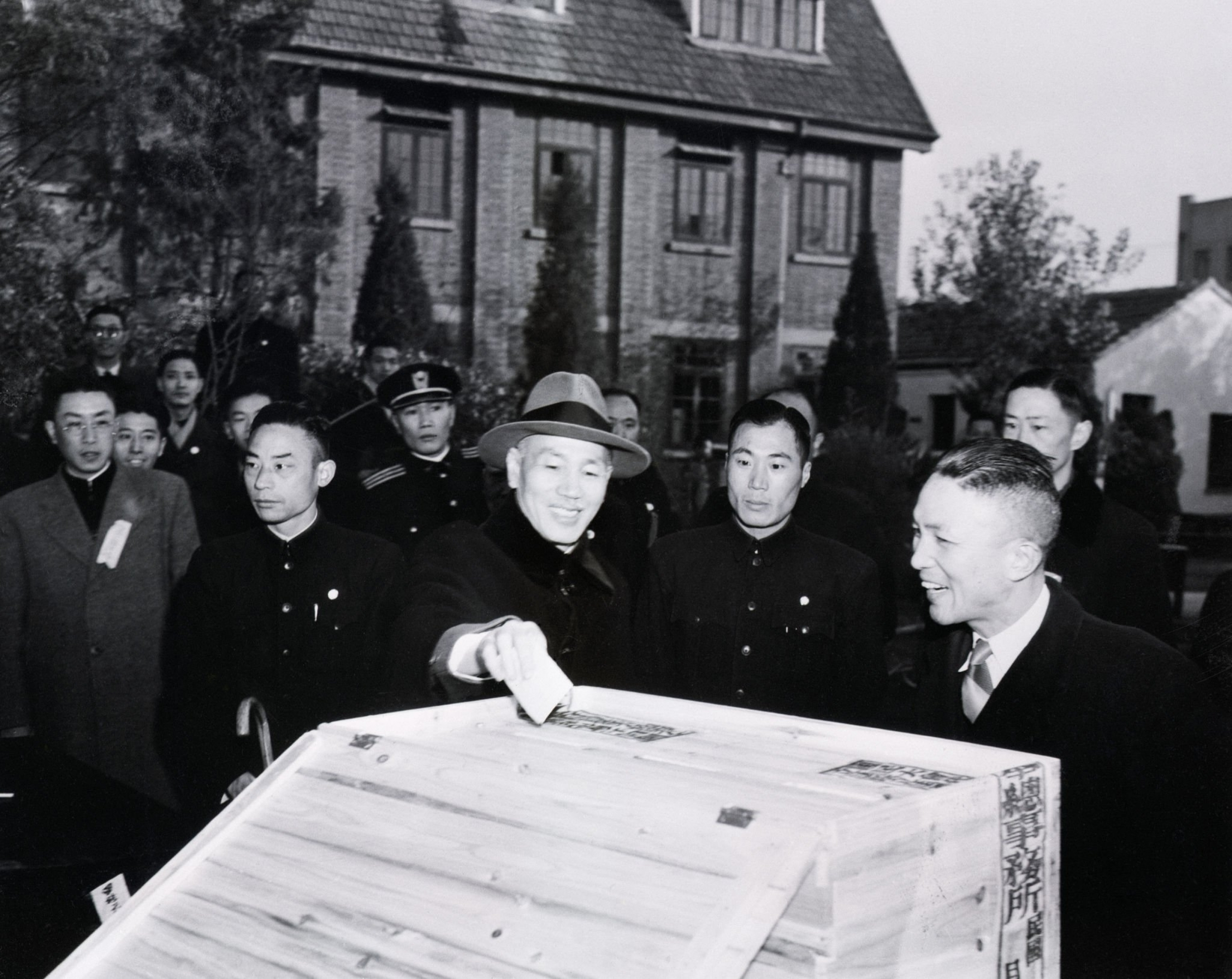
Chiang Kai-shek voted for Chen Yu-kuang, head of University of Nanking

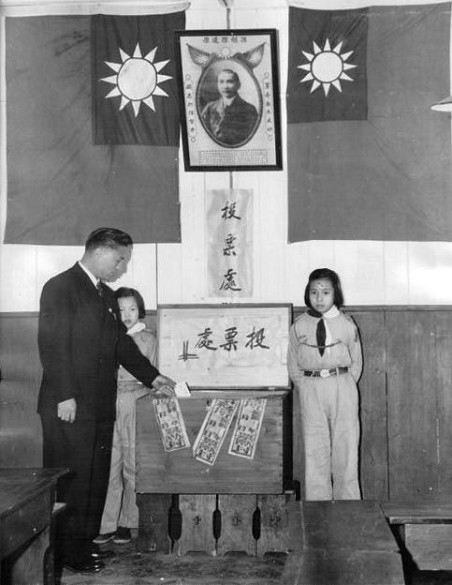
Party flag of Kuomintang adjacent to the portrait of founding President Sun Yat-sen was replaced by Flag of the Republic of China, marking to end of one-party rule

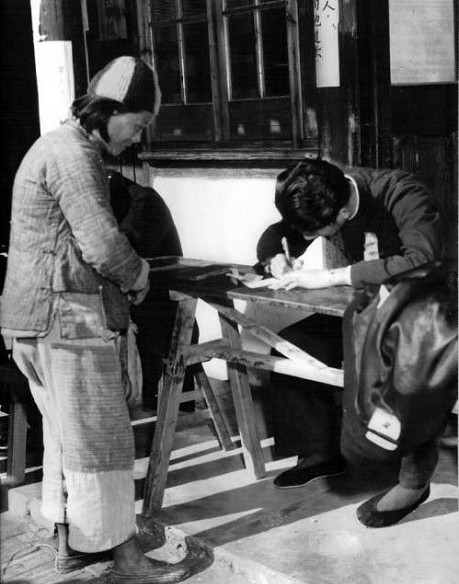
Females in rural areas were granted voting rights

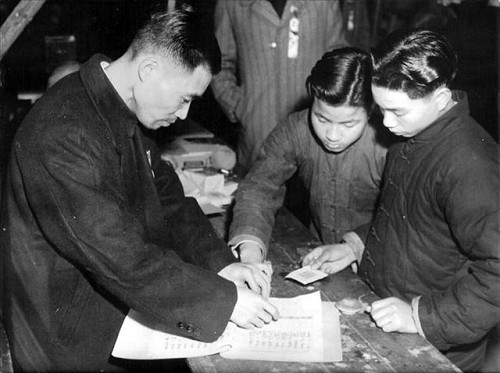
Voter registration

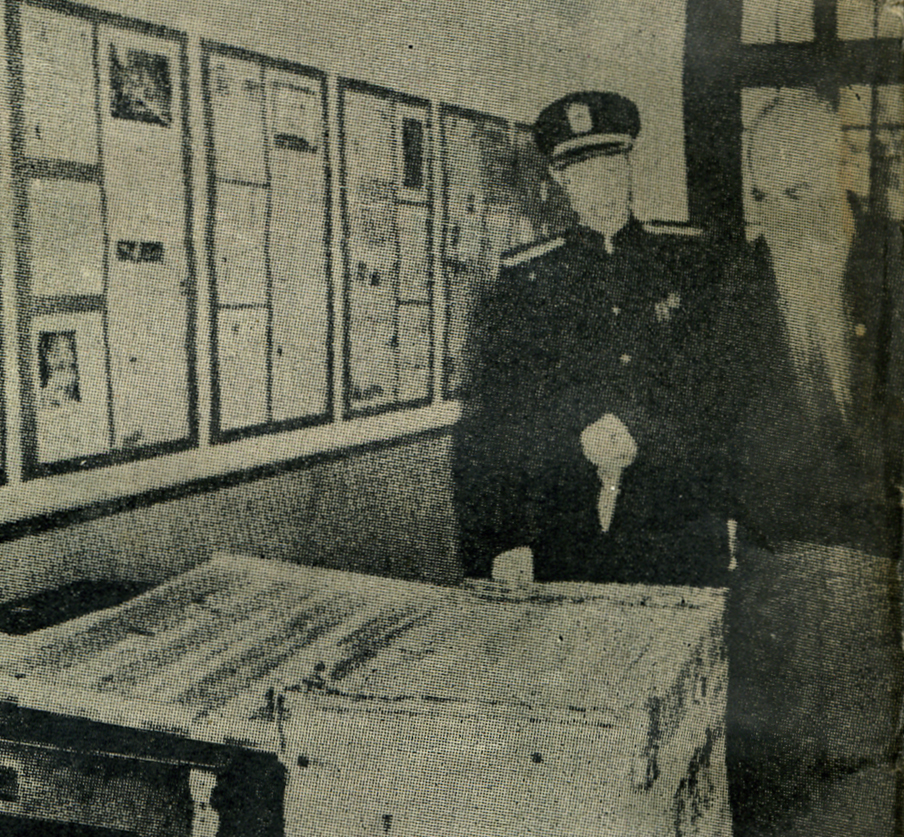
Yu Yu-jen, Director of the Control Yuan, was voting

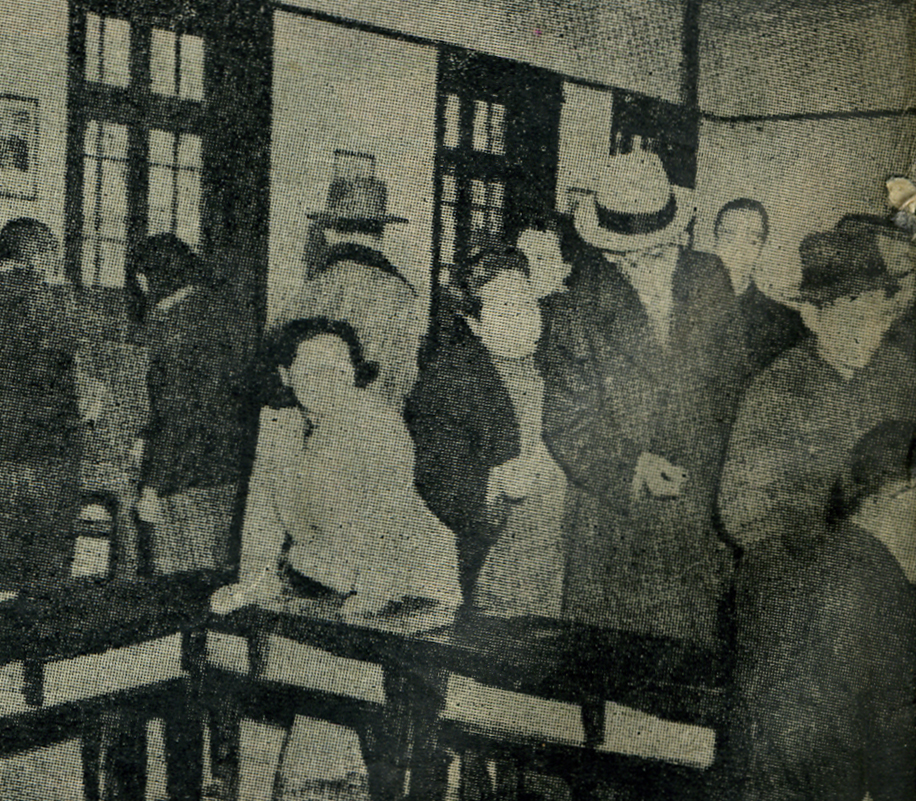
Wu Tiecheng, Secretary-general of Kuomintang, was queueing to vote, along with other Nanking voters

== See also ==
- Nationalist government
- Constitution of the Republic of China
- Temporary Provisions against the Communist Rebellion
- National Assembly (Republic of China)
- 1948 Chinese legislative election
