= 1972 Taiwanese presidential election =

- March 21, 1972
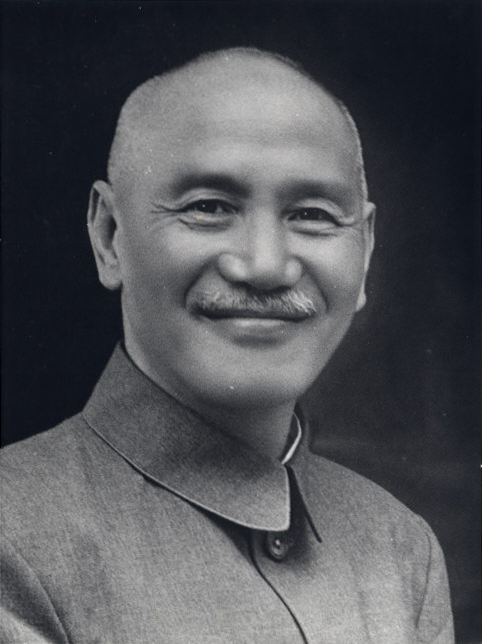
Nominee	Chiang Kai-shek
Party	KMT
Running mate	Yen Chia-kan
Electoral vote	1,308
Percentage	100.00%
President before election
Chiang Kai-shek
KMT
Elected President
Chiang Kai-shek
KMT

Indirect elections were held for the presidency and vice-presidency of the government of the Republic of China on Taiwan on March 21, 1972. The vote took place at the Chung-Shan Building in Yangmingshan, Taipei. Incumbent President Chiang Kai-shek, aged 85, was re-elected for the fifth term with his Vice President Yen Chia-kan. President Chiang died in office on April 5, 1975. Vice President Yen Chia-kan then sworn in as the President.

== Electors ==
The election was conducted by the National Assembly in its meeting place Chung-Shan Building in Yangmingshan, Taipei. According to the Temporary Provisions against the Communist Rebellion, National Assembly delegates elected in the following elections were eligible to vote:

- 1947 Chinese National Assembly election, and
- 1969 Taiwanese legislative election.

In total, there were 1,344 delegates reported to the secretariat to attend this fifth session of the first National Assembly.

== Results ==
=== President ===
Candidate	Party	Votes	%
Chiang Kai-shek	Kuomintang	1,308	100.00
Total		1,308	100.00
Valid votes		1,308	99.39
Invalid/blank votes		8	0.61
Total votes		1,316	100.00
Registered voters/turnout		1,344	97.92
Source: Schafferer

=== Vice president ===
Candidate	Party	Votes	%
Yen Chia-kan	Kuomintang	1,095	100.00
Total		1,095	100.00
Valid votes		1,095	83.78
Invalid/blank votes		212	16.22
Total votes		1,307	100.00
Registered voters/turnout		1,344	97.25
Source: Schafferer

== See also ==
- History of Republic of China
- President of the Republic of China
- Vice President of the Republic of China
