= 1966 Taiwanese presidential election =

- March 21, 1966
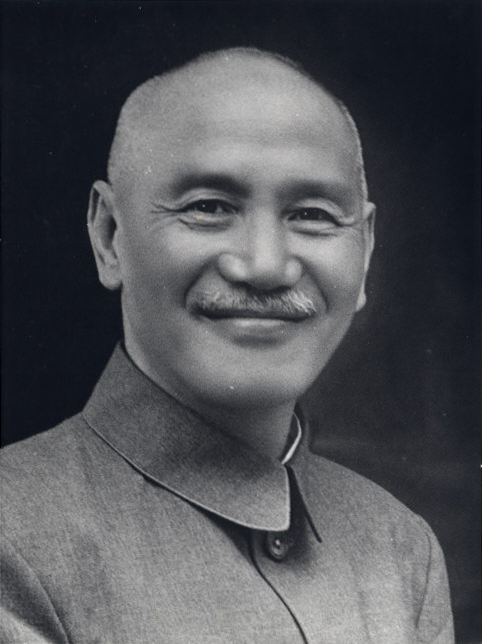
Nominee	Chiang Kai-shek
Party	Kuomintang
Running mate	Yen Chia-kan
Electoral vote	1,405
Percentage	100.00%
President before election
Chiang Kai-shek
Kuomintang
Elected President
Chiang Kai-shek
Kuomintang

Indirect elections were held for the presidency and vice-presidency of the government of the Republic of China on Taiwan on March 21, 1966. The vote took place at the Chung-Shan Hall in Taipei. Incumbent President Chiang Kai-shek was re-elected for the fourth term with his Vice-President Yen Chia-kan.

The amendment of the Temporary Provisions against the Communist Rebellion in 1960 had allowed Chiang Kai-shek to seek for unlimited terms. After the death of Vice President Chen Cheng in 1965. Chiang decided to pick premier Yen Chia-kan to be his running-mate, filling the vacancy. In the end, Yen was elected by a narrow majority, 55 per cent of the votes, while Chiang received 98 per cent of the votes.

== Electors ==
The election was conducted by the National Assembly in its meeting place Chung-Shan Hall in Taipei. According to the Temporary Provisions against the Communist Rebellion, the term of the delegates who were elected during the 1947 Chinese National Assembly election was extended indefinitely until "re-election is possible in their original electoral district". In total, there were 1,446 delegates reported to the secretariat to attend this fourth session of the first National Assembly.

== Results ==
=== President ===
Candidate	Party	Votes	%
Chiang Kai-shek	Kuomintang	1,405	100.00
Total		1,405	100.00
Valid votes		1,405	98.60
Invalid/blank votes		20	1.40
Total votes		1,425	100.00
Registered voters/turnout		1,446	98.55
Source: Schafferer

=== Vice president ===
Candidate	Party	Votes	%
Yen Chia-kan	Kuomintang	782	100.00
Total		782	100.00
Valid votes		782	55.23
Invalid/blank votes		634	44.77
Total votes		1,416	100.00
Registered voters/turnout		1,446	97.93
Source: Schafferer

== See also ==
- History of Republic of China
- President of the Republic of China
- Vice President of the Republic of China
