= 12th National Congress of the Kuomintang =

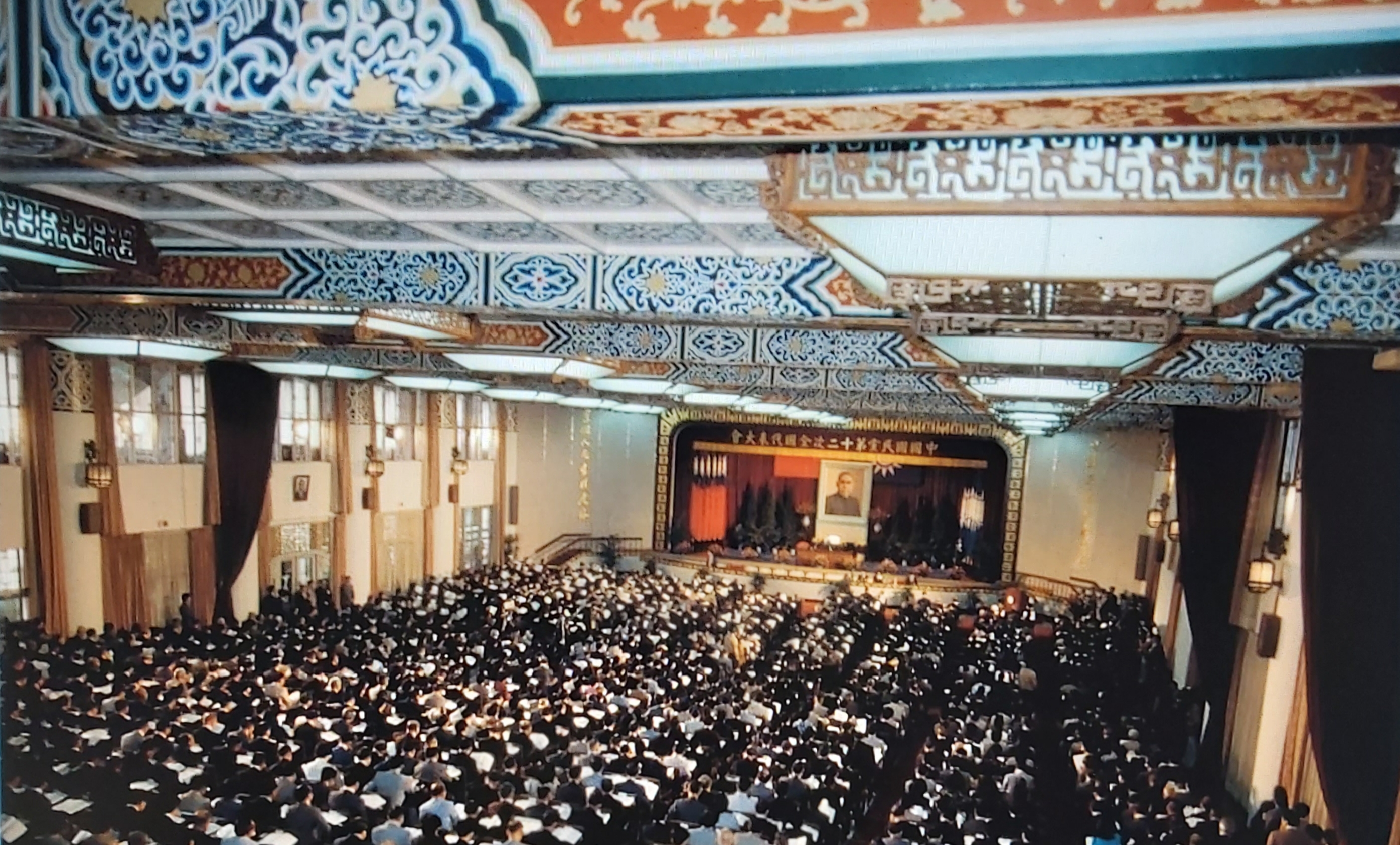
12th National Congress of the Kuomintang

The 12th National Congress of the Kuomintang (Chinese: 中國國民黨第十二次全國代表大会) was the twelfth national congress of the Kuomintang, held on 29 March – 4 April 1981 in Chung-Shan Building, Beitou District, Taipei, Taiwan.

== Results ==
Important resolutions passed were the "Unify China with the Three Principles of the People" and Chiang Ching-kuo reelection as Chairman of the Kuomintang.

== See also ==
- Kuomintang
