= 1960 Taiwanese presidential election =

- March 21, 1960
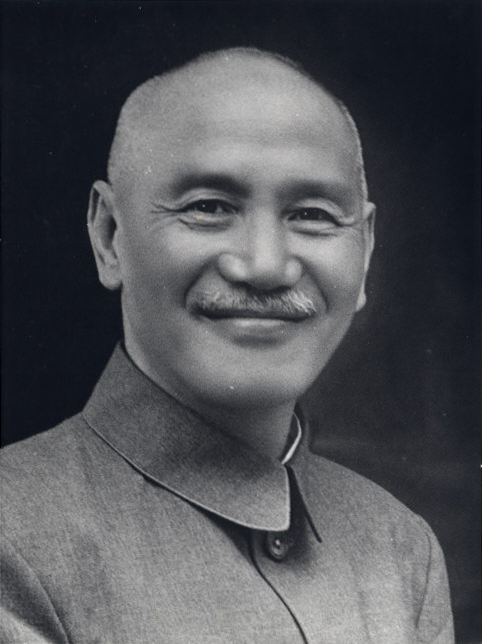
Nominee	Chiang Kai-shek
Party	Kuomintang
Running mate	Chen Cheng
Electoral vote	1,481
Percentage	100.00%
President before election
Chiang Kai-shek
Kuomintang
Elected President
Chiang Kai-shek
Kuomintang

Indirect elections were held for the presidency and vice-presidency of the government of the Republic of China on Taiwan on March 21, 1960. The vote took place at the Chung-Shan Hall in Taipei. Incumbent President Chiang Kai-shek and Vice President Chen Cheng was re-elected.

Before the election, the National Assembly amended the Temporary Provisions against the Communist Rebellion which allowed the President and vice-president to seek a third term, which superseded the Article 47 of the Constitution of the Republic of China, in order to make way for Chiang to be re-elected. As a result, Chiang received 1,481 votes of the 1,576 National Assembly members, while his running mate Chen Cheng was re-elected with 1,381 votes. The term began on May 20, 1960.

== Electors ==
The election was conducted by the National Assembly in its meeting place Chung-Shan Hall in Taipei. According to the Temporary Provisions against the Communist Rebellion, the term of the delegates who were elected during the 1947 Chinese National Assembly election was extended indefinitely until "re-election is possible in their original electoral district". In total, there were 1,521 delegates reported to the secretariat to attend this third session of the first National Assembly.

== Results ==
=== President ===
Candidate	Party	Votes	%
Chiang Kai-shek	Kuomintang	1,481	100.00
Total		1,481	100.00
Valid votes		1,481	98.14
Invalid/blank votes		28	1.86
Total votes		1,509	100.00
Registered voters/turnout		1,521	99.21
Source: Schafferer

=== Vice president ===
Candidate	Party	Votes	%
Chen Cheng	Kuomintang	1,381	100.00
Total		1,381	100.00
Valid votes		1,381	91.76
Invalid/blank votes		124	8.24
Total votes		1,505	100.00
Registered voters/turnout		1,521	98.95
Source: Schafferer

== See also ==
- History of Republic of China
- President of the Republic of China
- Vice President of the Republic of China
