= Chung-Shan Building =

Building in Beitou, Taipei, Taiwan

Chung-Shan Building 中山樓
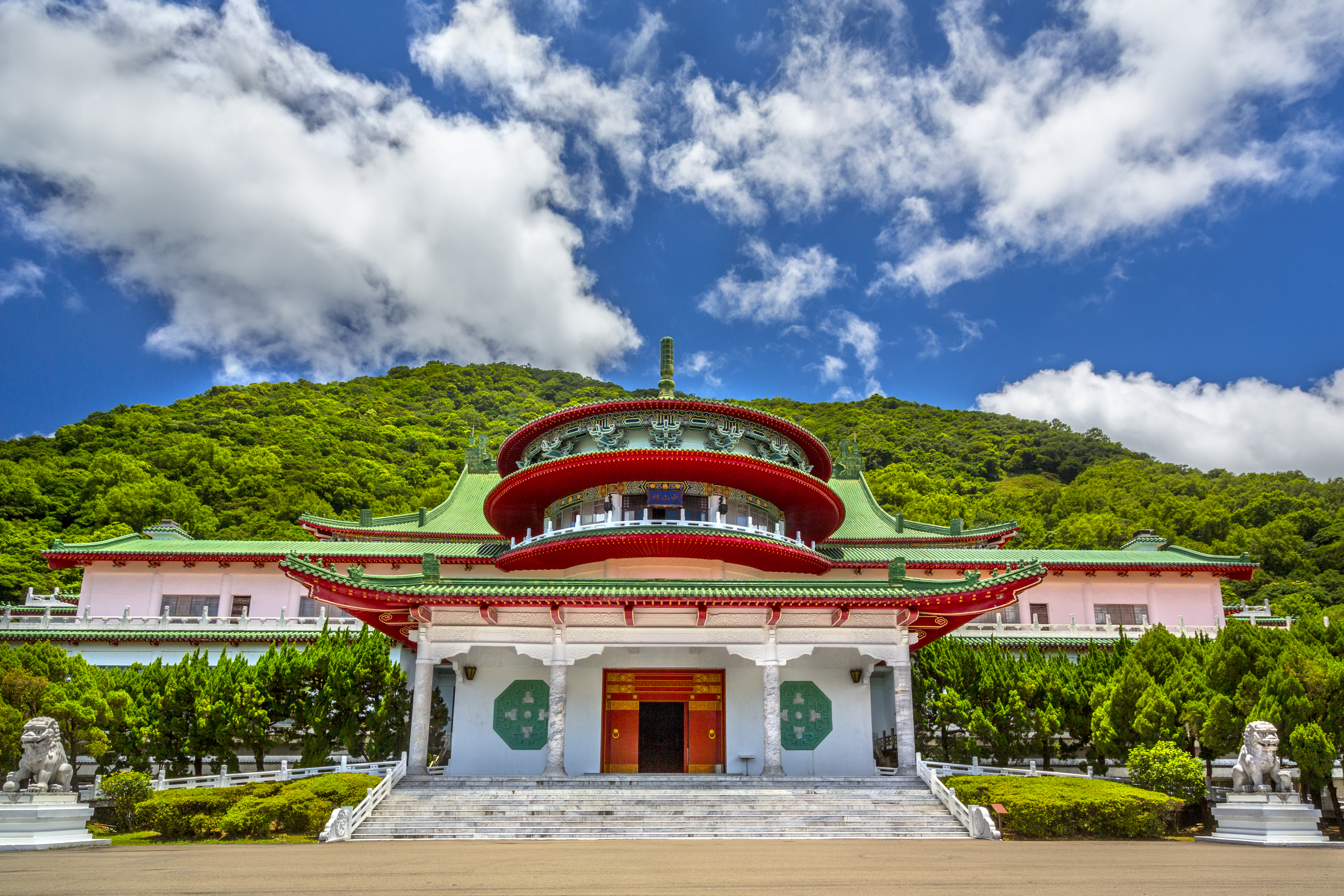
- The Chungshan Building facade
- Interactive map of the Chung-Shan Building 中山樓 area

General information
- Architectural style: Ming/Qing Dynasty
- Location: No. 15, Yangming Road, Sec. 2, Yangmingshan National Park, Beitou, Taipei, Taiwan
- Coordinates: 25°9′21.29″N 121°33′10.07″E
- Current tenants: Sun Yat-sen Memorial Hall
- Construction started: 1965
- Completed: 1966

Design and construction
- Architect: Xiu Zelan

Chung-Shan Building
- Traditional Chinese: 中山樓
Transcriptions
Standard Mandarin
- Hanyu Pinyin: Zhōngshān lou

The Chung-Shan Building (Chinese: 中山樓; pinyin: Zhōngshān Lóu) is part of the Sun Yat-sen Memorial Hall complex. Completed in 1966, the building is located in the Yangmingshan National Park in Taipei, Taiwan. The building is placed on the reverse of the 100 New Taiwan Dollar bill. The building was used as the meeting venue of the National Assembly and off limits to the general public until the National Assembly's suspension in 2005, and now serves as a location for hosting ceremonies by the President of the Republic of China for state visits and conferences.

== History ==
In 1965, with a view to commemorate Sun Yat-sen's centennial birthday and to revive traditional Chinese culture, President Chiang Kai-shek appointed architect Xiu Zelan to design the Chungshan Hall. Thousands of military veterans finished this construction within 13 months. Chungshan Hall once served as an exclusive convention site for the defunct National Assembly of the Republic of China, and an eminent locale for the head of state to receive distinguished foreign guests or host state banquets. Interiors at the hall are preserved as they were during the period in which it witnessed important scenes of constitutional development and historical events in the Republic of China. The government has designated the Chungshan Hall as a historical monument.

== Architecture ==
Chungshan Hall occupies a field of more than 130,000 square meters, and the building itself takes a dimension of over 18,000 square meters and 34 meters in height. Situated in the sulfurous area of Yangmingshan, the structure is firmly founded on a ground base composed of mixtures of soft and hard soil, rocks and mud. The Chungshan Hall is a rarity of large-size edifice in the world that is erected directly at a sulfuric-gas spurting pit.

The interior embellishments include over 400 hand crafted palace lanterns, mother-of-pearl inlaid furniture, ceiling, design of doors and windows, and color drawings of pillars.

== Photo Gallery ==
Chung-Shan Building

Chung-Shan Building

Entrance hall

Main Hall

Dining Hall

Dining Hall

Conference Room

Round Hall

Reception Hall

== Events ==
- 10th National Congress of the Kuomintang
- 12th National Congress of the Kuomintang

== See also ==
- Zhongshan Hall
- Nanjing Great Hall of the People
- Great Hall of the People
