= Temporary Provisions against the Communist Rebellion =

Amendments of the Constitution of the Republic of China

Temporary Provisions Effective During the Period of National Mobilization for Suppression of the Communist Rebellion

Overview
- Original title: 動員戡亂時期臨時條款
- Jurisdiction: Republic of China (1948-1949, 1949-1991)
- Ratified: 18 April 1948; 78 years ago
- Date effective: 10 May 1948; 78 years ago
- System: Unitary parliamentary constitutional republic (de jure); Unitary Tridemist one-party presidential constitutional republic under a military dictatorship (de facto)

Government structure
- Branches: Five (Executive, Legislative, Judicial, Examination, Control)
- Head of state: President
- Chambers: Tricameral (National Assembly, Legislative Yuan, Control Yuan)
- Executive: Premier led Executive Yuan
- Judiciary: Judicial Yuan
- Federalism: Unitary
- Electoral college: Yes (National Assembly)

History
- First legislature: 1 May 1950 (LY)
- First executive: 1 March 1950 (President)
- Repealed: 1 May 1991; 35 years ago
- Amendments: 4
- Last amended: 1972
- Supersedes: Suspension of the Constitution of the Republic of China

Temporary Provisions Effective During the Period of National Mobilization for Suppression of the Communist Rebellion
- Traditional Chinese: 動員戡亂時期臨時條款
- Simplified Chinese: 动员戡乱时期临时条款
Transcriptions
Standard Mandarin
- Hanyu Pinyin: Dòngyuán Kānluàn Shíqī Línshí Tiáokuǎn
- Wade–Giles: Tung^{4}-yüan^{2} K'an^{1}-luan^{4} Shih^{2}-ch'i^{1} Lin^{2}-shih^{2} T'ien^{2}-k'uan^{3}
- IPA: [tʊ̂ŋɥɛ̌n kʰánlɥɛ̂n ʂɻ̩̌tɕʰí lǐnʂɻ̩́ tʰjǎʊkʰwàn]

The Temporary Provisions Effective During the Period of National Mobilization for Suppression of the Communist Rebellion of the Constitution of the Republic of China were effective from 1948 to 1991 and amended four times by the Central Government of the Republic of China. They effectively nullified the constitution and established martial law in Taiwan, where civil and political freedoms were curtailed. The official rationale for the provisions was the ongoing Chinese Civil War. However, with the demise of the Kuomintang single-party system, the provisions were repealed.

== History ==
The Republic of China adopted its current constitution in 1947 during the Chinese Civil War. In March 1948, the National Assembly elected to amend the constitution through Article 174 to grant the state emergency powers to prosecute the civil war. The amending Temporary Provisions were intended to expire after three years and were adopted on 10 May 1948. In 1954, following the ROC's defeat in the civil war and retreat to the island of Taiwan, the National Assembly extended the duration of the Temporary Provisions to be indefinite. The Temporary Provisions were amended in 1966 to allow for supplementary elections to the National Assembly from the Taiwan Area. There were further amendments in 1972, following the ROC's replacement in the United Nations by the People's Republic of China in 1971.

=== Abolition ===
On 22 April 1991, at the end of the Cold War, the National Assembly decided to repeal the Temporary Provisions; on 30 April, President Lee Teng-hui announced that Temporary Provisions measures would end the next day. Another amendment, the Additional Articles of the Constitution of the Republic of China, entered force on 1 May. The repeal of the Provisions caused some ambiguity in cross-strait relations and the political status of Taiwan, raising questions such as whether the "Communist rebellion" has "succeeded" and so the PRC government is recognized as legitimate by the ROC, or whether it would be legal now for the CCP to operate in Taiwan.

== Provisions ==
The Temporary Provisions allowed for the creation of the Taiwan Garrison Command and the National Security Council, both for the purpose of enforcing martial law. The provisions also allowed the President and Vice President of the Republic of China to be exempted from the two-term office limit. Extensive powers given to the president by the Temporary Provisions turned the ROC into a de facto presidential system, where the President also held the post of chairman of the Kuomintang, although the Constitution originally laid out a parliamentary system. Specifically, the provision relating to the president said:

In this Period of Communist Rebellion, for the sake of avoiding the emergent political crisis, and addressing the mammoth economic change, the president is empowered to adopt emergency measures through a resolution of a cabinet meeting of the Executive Yuan. The president's power will not be limited by the regular procedures of Articles 39 and 43 of the constitution.

== See also ==
- Anti anti-communism – Opposition to anti-communism as applied in the Cold War
- Elections in the Republic of China
- History of the Republic of China
- Human rights in the Republic of China
- Transitional Justice Commission
- Period of mobilization for the suppression of Communist rebellion
- Politics of the Republic of China
- Republic of China Army
- History of Taiwan since 1945
- Tangwai movement
- List of political leaders who suspended the constitution
