= Republic of China calendar =

Calendar used in Taiwan

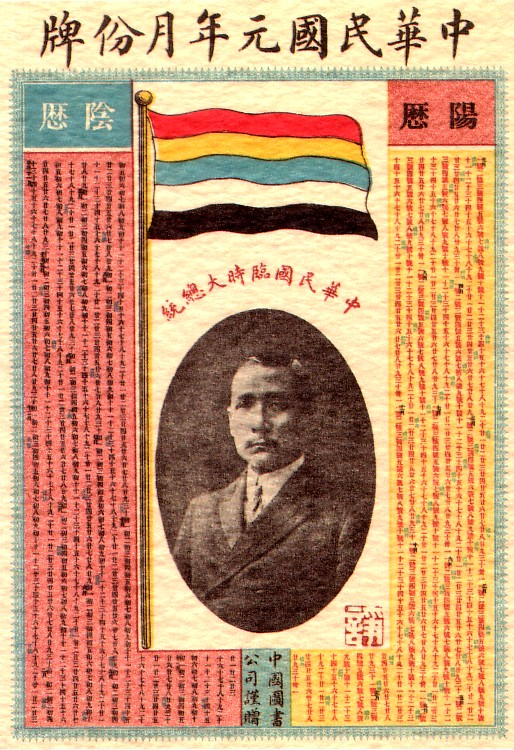
- A calendar with both Western and Chinese calendar dates commemorating the first year of the Republic of China, as well as the election of Sun Yat-sen as the provisional President of the Republic of China
- Traditional Chinese: 中華民國曆
- Simplified Chinese: 中华民国历
Transcriptions
Standard Mandarin
- Hanyu Pinyin: Zhōnghuá mínguó lì
- Wade–Giles: Chung^{1}-hua^{2} Min^{2}-kuo^{2} li^{4}
- IPA: [ʈʂʊ́ŋ.xwǎ mǐn.kwǒ lî]
Hakka
- Romanization: Chûng-fà Mìn-koet la̍k
Yue: Cantonese
- Yale Romanization: Jūng-wàh màhn-gwok lihk
- Jyutping: zung1 waa4 man4 gwok3 lik6
- IPA: [tsʊŋ˥ wa˩ mɐn˩ kʷɔk̚˧ lɪk̚˨]
Southern Min
- Hokkien POJ: Tiong-hoa Bîn-kok le̍k

Alternative Chinese name
- Traditional Chinese: 民國紀年
- Simplified Chinese: 民国纪年
- Literal meaning: Republic [of China] year numbering system
Transcriptions
Standard Mandarin
- Hanyu Pinyin: Mínguó jìnián
- Wade–Giles: Min^{2}-kuo^{2} Chi^{4}-nien^{2}
- IPA: [mǐn.kwǒ tɕî.njɛ̌n]
Yue: Cantonese
- Yale Romanization: Màhn-gwok géi-nìhn
- Jyutping: man4 gwok3 gei2 nin4
- IPA: [mɐn˩ kʷɔk̚˧ kej˧˥ nin˩]

Current date and time, Republic of China calendar
- Gregorian full date: 2026年9月29日
- Gregorian all-numeric date: 2026-09-29; 2026/09/29
- ROC calendar: 115-09-29; 115.09.29
- National Standard Time of Taiwan: 16:49 下午 4:49

The Republic of China calendar, often shortened to the ROC calendar or the Minguo calendar, is a calendar used in the Republic of China (ROC). The calendar uses 1912, the year of the establishment of the ROC in Nanjing, as year 1, making (2026) in the Gregorian calendar 115th in the Republic of China calendar.

The ROC calendar is similar to the tradition of using the sovereign's era name and year of reign during the previous dynasties of China. Months and days are numbered according to the Gregorian calendar. The ROC calendar has been commonly used in the ROC since 1912, including in early official documents.

The ROC calendar has been the official calendar used in Taiwan since 1945, and also adopted by overseas Chinese and Taiwanese communities. Chorographies and historical research published in mainland China covering the period between 1912 and 1949 also use the ROC calendar.

== History ==
Before the Republic of China, the Chinese dating system had used the monarch's era name and year of reign. In the 1900s, republican newspapers started using the birth of the semi-legendary Yellow Emperor in the third millennium BC as the bases for the dating system. However, disagreements over his birth date resulted in inconsistent dating in the publications.

On 1 January 1912, Sun Yat-sen was elected the provisional president of the Republic of China. He decreed that a solar calendar would be adopted with its epoch at the 13th day of 11th lunar month of the 4609th year of the Yellow Emperor, corresponding to 1 January 1912.

== Structure ==
The epoch of the calendar corresponds to the founding of the Republic of China on 1 January 1912. The year is usually expressed with 'republic' (民國; mínguó) – employed as an abbreviation of 'Republic of China' (中華民國; Zhōnghuá mínguó) – prepended before. For example, the first year, 1912, is called Mínguó yuánnián (民國元年), and 2026, the "115th year of the Republic" is 民國一百一十五年, 民國115年, or simply 115.

The ROC epoch happens to start on the same year as that of the former North Korean calendar used from 1997 through 2024, as North Korean founder Kim Il Sung was born in 1912. The first year of Japan's Taishō era (30 July 1912 – 25 December 1926) also coincides with that of the ROC era.

In addition to the ROC calendar, Taiwanese people continue to use the lunar Chinese calendar for certain functions such as the dates of many holidays, the calculation of people's ages, and religious functions.

== Criticisms ==
The use of the ROC era system extends beyond official documents. Misinterpretation is more likely in the cases when the prefix (ROC or 民國) is omitted.

There have been legislative proposals by political parties of the Pan-Green Coalition, such as the Democratic Progressive Party, to formally abolish the ROC calendar in favor of the Gregorian calendar.

== Relation to the Gregorian calendar ==
To convert any Gregorian calendar year (1912 and after) to the ROC calendar, subtract 1911. For example, last year (2025) was 114; this year (2026) is 115; and next year (2027) will be 116.

ROC era	1	2	3	4	5	6	7	8	9	10
AD	1912	1913	1914	1915	1916	1917	1918	1919	1920	1921
ROC era	11	12	13	14	15	16	17	18	19	20
AD	1922	1923	1924	1925	1926	1927	1928	1929	1930	1931
ROC era	21	22	23	24	25	26	27	28	29	30
AD	1932	1933	1934	1935	1936	1937	1938	1939	1940	1941
ROC era	31	32	33	34	35	36	37	38	39	40
AD	1942	1943	1944	1945	1946	1947	1948	1949	1950	1951
ROC era	41	42	43	44	45	46	47	48	49	50
AD	1952	1953	1954	1955	1956	1957	1958	1959	1960	1961
ROC era	51	52	53	54	55	56	57	58	59	60
AD	1962	1963	1964	1965	1966	1967	1968	1969	1970	1971
ROC era	61	62	63	64	65	66	67	68	69	70
AD	1972	1973	1974	1975	1976	1977	1978	1979	1980	1981
ROC era	71	72	73	74	75	76	77	78	79	80
AD	1982	1983	1984	1985	1986	1987	1988	1989	1990	1991
ROC era	81	82	83	84	85	86	87	88	89	90
AD	1992	1993	1994	1995	1996	1997	1998	1999	2000	2001
ROC era	91	92	93	94	95	96	97	98	99	100
AD	2002	2003	2004	2005	2006	2007	2008	2009	2010	2011
ROC era	101	102	103	104	105	106	107	108	109	110
AD	2012	2013	2014	2015	2016	2017	2018	2019	2020	2021
ROC era	111	112	113	114	115	116	117	118	119	120
AD	2022	2023	2024	2025	2026	2027	2028	2029	2030	2031
ROC era	121	122	123	124	125	126	127	128	129	130
AD	2032	2033	2034	2035	2036	2037	2038	2039	2040	2041
ROC era	131	132	133	134	135	136	137	138	139	140
AD	2042	2043	2044	2045	2046	2047	2048	2049	2050	2051
ROC era	141	142	143	144	145	146	147	148	149	150
AD	2052	2053	2054	2055	2056	2057	2058	2059	2060	2061

== See also ==
- Chinese era name
- East Asian age reckoning
- Public holidays in Taiwan
- Juche calendar
- Taishō era
