= 3701 =

3701 may refer to:

- The first year in the 38th century
- 3701 Purkyně asteroid
- Hirth 3701 two stroke aircraft engine
- Air Force 3701, presidential aircraft of the Republic of China
