= Xinhai Revolution Museum =

- Established: September 2011
- Location: Wuchang, Wuhan
- Type: History museum
- Website: www.1911museum.cn

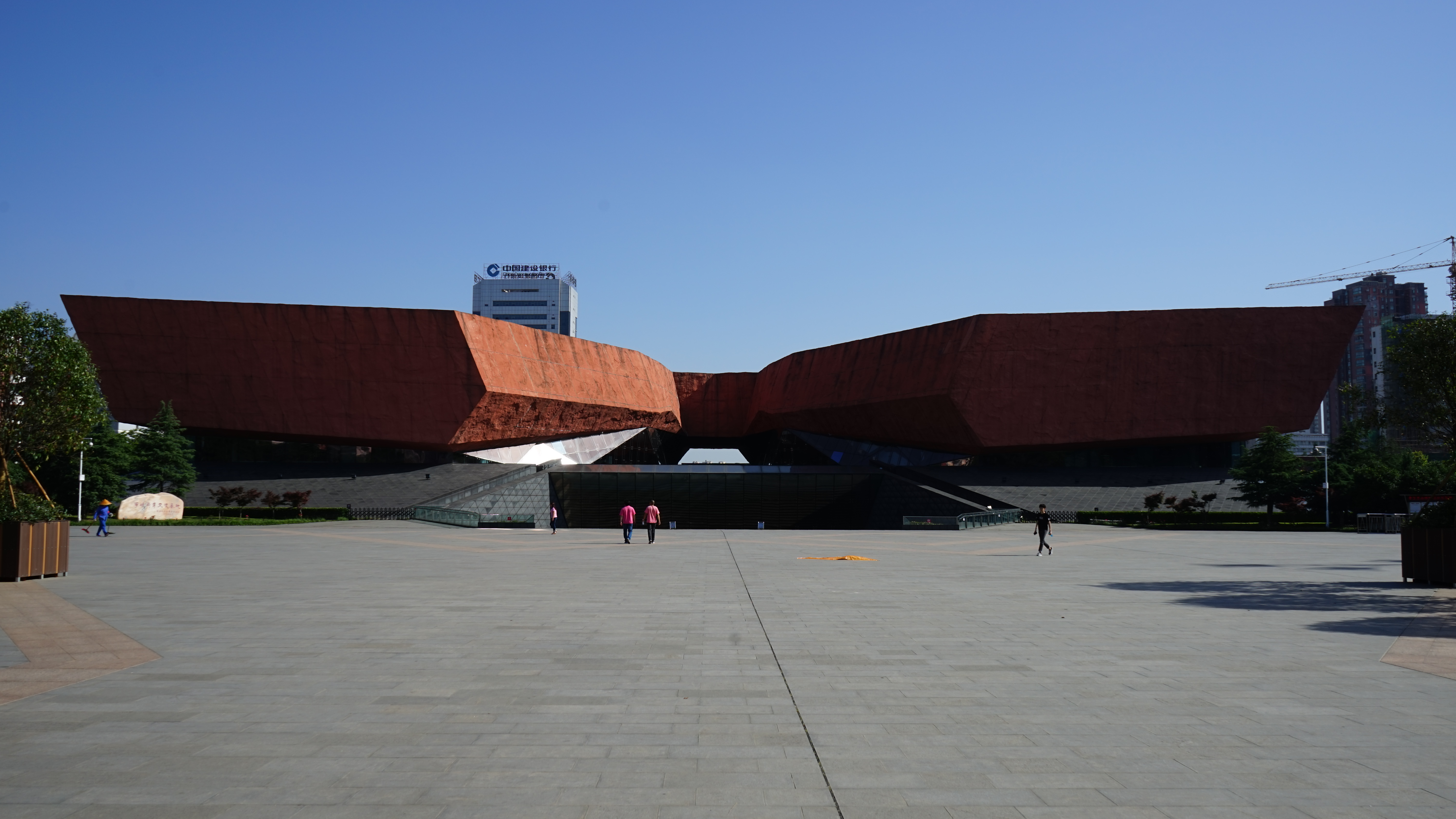
The Xinhai Revolution Museum

The Xinhai Revolution Museum (simplified Chinese: 辛亥革命博物馆; traditional Chinese: 辛亥革命博物館), fully named as Wuhan Xinhai Revolution Museum (simplified Chinese: 武汉辛亥革命博物馆; traditional Chinese: 武漢辛亥革命博物館), also known as the Revolution of 1911 Museum, 1911 Revolution Museum, is a Wuhan-based thematic museum built to commemorate the 100th anniversary of the "Wuchang First Uprising of the Xinhai Revolution" (辛亥革命武昌首義). The museum is located in the Wuchang District, Wuhan City, with a total construction area of 22,142 square meters.

The construction of the Xinhai Revolution Museum started in August 2009 and was completed in September 2011, and has been open to the public for free since October 15, 2011.
