= President of the Republic of China =

Head of state

- 中華民國總統
- Presidential seal

- Presidential standard

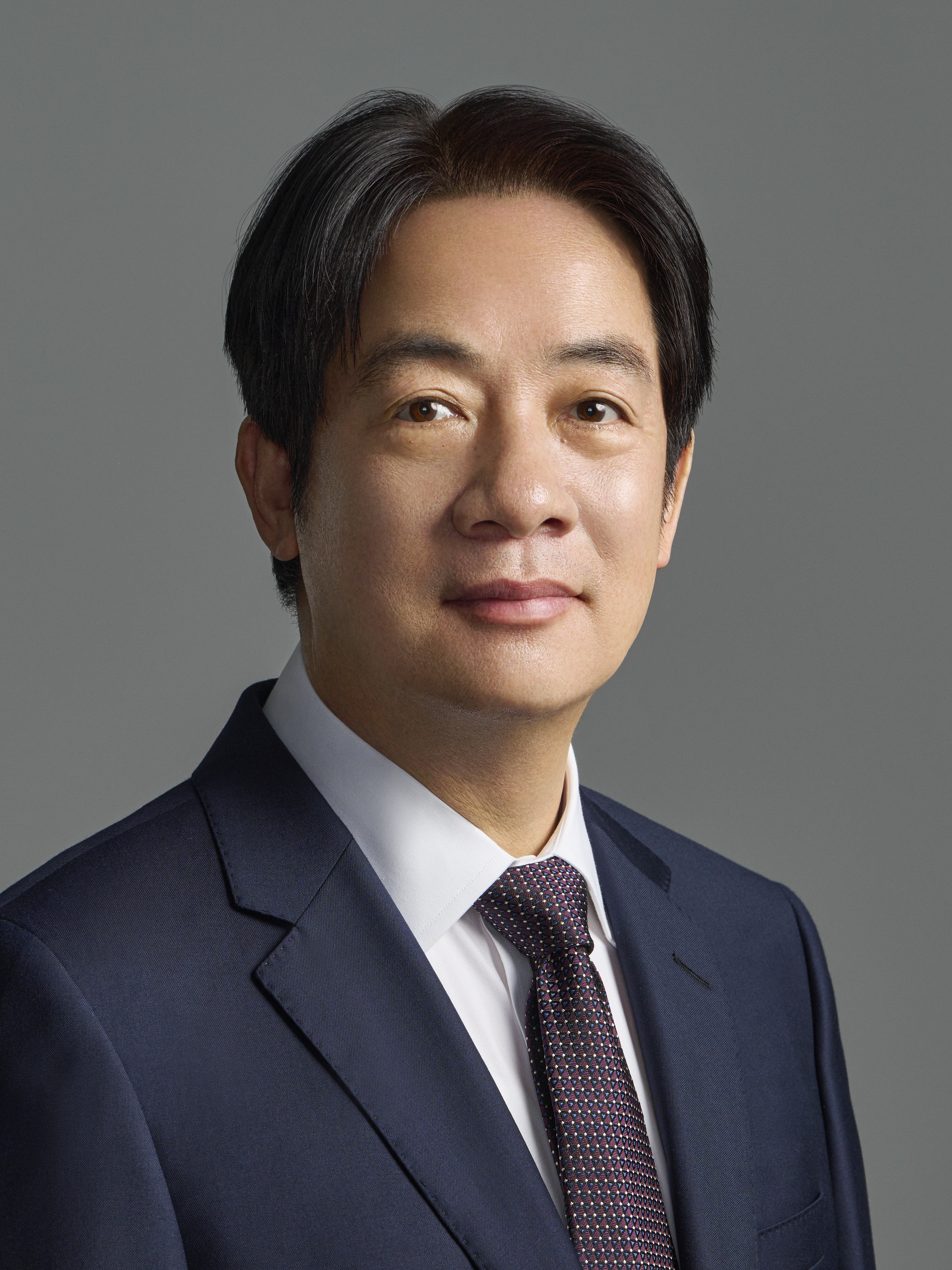
- Incumbent; Lai Ching-te since 20 May 2024
- Office of the President
- Style: Mr. President (informal); His Excellency (diplomatic)
- Status: Head of state Commander-in-chief
- Member of: National Security Council
- Residence: Wanli Residence
- Seat: Presidential Office Building, Taipei
- Appointer: Direct election (Note: Previously the National Assembly from 1948 to 1996.) or via succession
- Term length: 4 years; renewable once
- Precursor: Emperor of China (before 1912 and between 1915-1916); Chairman of the National Government (between 1928–1948)
- Formation: 1 January 1912; 114 years ago (provisional, in Mainland China); 25 October 1945; 81 years ago (Note: In colonial Taiwan, the post was represented by the Emperor of Japan from 10 May 1895.) (Taiwan handover); 20 May 1948; 78 years ago (current form)
- First holder: Sun Yat-sen (as Provisional President); Yuan Shikai (as President of the Beiyang Government); Chiang Kai-shek (on Taiwan)
- Final holder: Li Zongren (in Mainland China)
- Abolished: 1 October 1949; 77 years ago (Mainland China)
- Succession: Chairman of the Central People's Government of the People's Republic of China (Mainland China)
- Unofficial names: President of Taiwan
- Deputy: Vice President
- Salary: NTD 531,000 monthly (2024)
- Website: english.president.gov.tw

President of the Republic of China
- Traditional Chinese: 中華民國總統
- Simplified Chinese: 中华民国总统
Transcriptions
Standard Mandarin
- Hanyu Pinyin: Zhōnghuá Mínguó Zǒngtǒng
- Bopomofo: ㄓㄨㄥ ㄏㄨㄚˊ ㄇㄧㄣˊ ㄍㄨㄛˊ ㄗㄨㄥˇ ㄊㄨㄥˇ
- Gwoyeu Romatzyh: Jonghwa Min'gwo Tzoongtoong
- Wade–Giles: Chung¹-hua² Min²-kuo² Tsung³-t'ung³
- Tongyong Pinyin: Jhonghuá Mínguó Zǒngtǒng
- MPS2: Jūng-huá Mín-guó Tzǔng-tǔng
Hakka
- Romanization: Chûng-fà Mìn-koet Chúng-thúng
Southern Min
- Hokkien POJ: Tiong-hôa Bîn-kok Chóng-thóng
- Tâi-lô: Tiong-hûa Bîn-kok Tsóng-thóng

President of China (until 1971)
- Traditional Chinese: 中國總統
- Simplified Chinese: 中国总统
Transcriptions
Standard Mandarin
- Hanyu Pinyin: Zhōngguó Zǒngtǒng
- Bopomofo: ㄓㄨㄥ ㄍㄨㄛˊ ㄗㄨㄥˇ ㄊㄨㄥˇ
- Gwoyeu Romatzyh: Jong'gwo Tzoongtoong
- Wade–Giles: Chung¹-kuo² Tsung³-t'ung³
- Tongyong Pinyin: Jhongguó Zǒngtǒng
- MPS2: Jūng-guó Tzǔng-tǔng
Hakka
- Romanization: Chûng-koet Chúng-thúng
Southern Min
- Hokkien POJ: Tiong-kok Chóng-thóng
- Tâi-lô: Tiong-kok Tsóng-thóng

President of Taiwan
- Traditional Chinese: 臺灣總統 台灣總統
- Simplified Chinese: 台湾总统
Transcriptions

The president of the Republic of China, also known as the president of Taiwan, is the head of state of the Republic of China (Taiwan), as well as the commander-in-chief of the Republic of China Armed Forces. Before 1949 the position had the authority of ruling over mainland China, but losing control of it after communist victory in the Chinese Civil War, the remaining jurisdictions of the ROC have been limited to Taiwan, Penghu, Kinmen, Matsu, and smaller islands.

Originally elected by the National Assembly, the presidency was intended to be a ceremonial office with no real executive power because the ROC was originally envisioned as a parliamentary republic. Since the 1996 election however, the president has been directly elected by plurality voting to a four-year term, with incumbents limited to serving two terms. The current president is Lai Ching-te of the Democratic Progressive Party, preceded by Tsai Ing-wen from the same party.

== Qualifications ==
- The Presidential and Vice Presidential Election and Recall Act states that a candidate for president or vice president must be a citizen of the Republic of China, at least 40 years old, and a resident of the Taiwan Area for a period of no less than 15 years with a physical presence of no less than 6 consecutive months.
- The following persons shall not be registered as candidates for the president:
  - Military personnel
  - Election officials
  - People who hold foreign nationality or who do not reside in the Free Area of the Republic of China
  - People who have restored their nationality or acquired their nationality by naturalization

== Powers ==
The president is currently elected for a term of four years by a plurality voting direct election of areas administered by the Republic of China. Before 1991, the president was selected by the National Assembly of the Republic of China for a term of six years.

The Constitution of the Republic of China names the president as head of state and commander-in-chief of the Republic of China Armed Forces (formerly the National Revolutionary Army). The president is responsible for conducting foreign relations, such as concluding treaties, declaring war, and making peace. The president must promulgate all laws and has no right to veto, but can approve or decline a veto proposed by the Executive Yuan (Cabinet). Other powers of the president include granting amnesty, pardon or clemency, declaring martial law, and conferring honors and decorations.

The president may, by resolution of the Executive Yuan Council, issue emergency decrees and take all necessary measures to avert imminent danger affecting the security of the state or of the people or to cope with any serious financial or economic crisis. However, such decrees shall, within ten days of issuance, be presented to the Legislative Yuan for ratification. Should the Legislative Yuan withhold ratification, said emergency decrees are rendered invalid.

The president may, within ten days following passage by the Legislative Yuan of a no-confidence vote against the premier, dissolve the Legislative Yuan after consulting with its president. However, the president may not dissolve the Legislative Yuan while martial law or an emergency decree is in effect. Following a dissolution of the Legislative Yuan, an election for legislators must be held within 60 days.

The president can also appoint senior advisors (資政), national policy advisors (國策顧問) and strategy advisors (戰略顧問), but they do not form a council.

The Constitution does not clearly define whether the president is more powerful than the premier, as it names the Executive Yuan (headed by the premier) as the "highest administrative authority" with oversight over domestic matters, while giving the president powers as commander-in-chief of the military and authority over foreign affairs. Prior to his election as president in 1948, Chiang Kai-shek had insisted that he be premier under the new Constitution, while allowing the presidency (to which he nominated Hu Shih) be reduced to a figurehead role. However, the National Assembly overwhelmingly supported Chiang as president and once in this position, Chiang continued to exercise vast prerogatives as leader, and the premiership served to execute policy, not make it. Thus, until the 1980s, power in the Republic of China was personalized rather than institutionalized, which meant presidential power depended largely on who occupied the office. For example, Yen Chia-kan was a mostly ceremonial president, with real power in the hands of Premier Chiang Ching-Kuo, who carried said power with him to the office of president. After President Lee Teng-hui succeeded Chiang as president in 1988, the power struggle within the KMT extended to constitutional debate over the relationship between the president and the premier. The first three premiers under Lee (Yu Kuo-hwa, Lee Huan, and Hau Pei-tsun) were mainlanders who had initially opposed Lee's ascent to power. The appointments of Lee Huan and Hau were compromises by President Lee to placate KMT conservatives. The subsequent appointment of the first native Taiwanese premier, Lien Chan, was seen as Lee consolidating power. Moreover, during this time the power of the premier to approve the presidential appointments, and the power of the Legislative Yuan to confirm the president's choice of premier, were removed. This established the president as the more powerful official.

After the 2000 election of Chen Shui-bian as president, the presidency and Legislative Yuan were controlled by different parties, which brought forth a number of latent constitutional issues, such as the role of the Legislative Yuan in appointing and dismissing a premier, the right of the president to call a special session of the Legislative Yuan, and exactly who has the power to call a referendum. Most of these issues have been resolved through inter-party negotiations.

== Succession ==
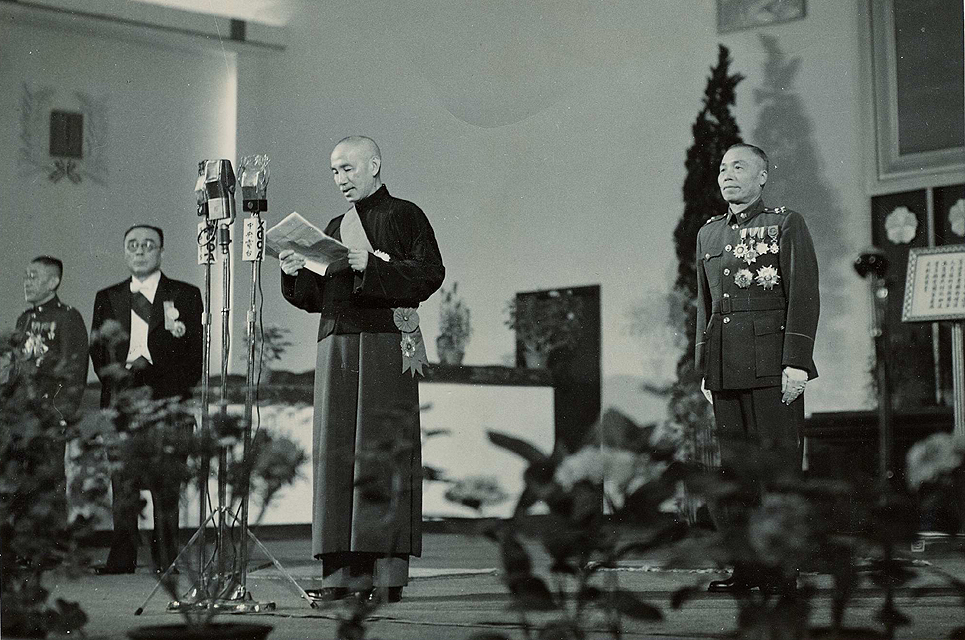
Chiang Kai-shek and Li Zongren were elected by the National Assembly to be the first-term president and vice president on 20 May 1948.

The Constitution of the Republic of China gives a short list of persons who will succeed to the presidency if the office were to fall vacant. According to the Additional Articles of the Constitution, Article 2:

Should the office of the vice president become vacant, the president shall nominate a candidate(s) within three months, and the Legislative Yuan shall elect a new vice president, who shall serve the remainder of the original term until its expiration.

Should the offices of both the president and the vice president become vacant, the president of the Executive Yuan shall exercise the official powers of the president and the vice president. A new president and a new vice president shall be elected in accordance with Paragraph 1 of this article and shall serve out each respective original term until its expiration. The pertinent provisions of Article 49 of the Constitution shall not apply.

As no president of the Executive Yuan (also known as the premier) has ever succeeded to the presidency under these provisions (or their predecessors, under Article 49), it is untested whether, should the office of the premier be vacant as well, whether, pursuant to the Additional Articles, Article 3, the vice president of the Executive Yuan (vice premier), who would be acting premier, would act as president. There is currently no constitutional provision for a succession list beyond the possibility that the vice president of the Executive Yuan might succeed to the presidency.

Assuming that the vice president of the Executive Yuan would be third in line for the presidency, the current line of succession is:

1. Hsiao Bi-khim, Vice President of the Republic of China.
2. Cho Jung-tai, President of the Executive Yuan.
3. Cheng Li-chun, Vice President of the Executive Yuan.

Presidential succession has occurred three times under the 1947 Constitution:

1. President Chiang Kai-shek declared incapacity on 21 January 1949 amid several Communist victories in the Chinese Civil War and was replaced by Vice President Li Zongren as the acting president. However, Chiang continued to wield authority as the director-general of the Kuomintang and commander-in-chief of the Republic of China Armed Forces. Li Zongren lost the ensuing power struggle and fled to the United States in November 1949. Chiang evacuated with the government to Taiwan on 10 December 1949 and resumed his duties as the president on 1 March 1950.
2. President Chiang Kai-shek died on 5 April 1975 and was replaced by Vice President Yen Chia-kan, who served out the remainder of the term.
3. President Chiang Ching-kuo died on 13 January 1988 and was replaced by Vice President Lee Teng-hui, who served out the remainder of the term and won two more terms on his own right.
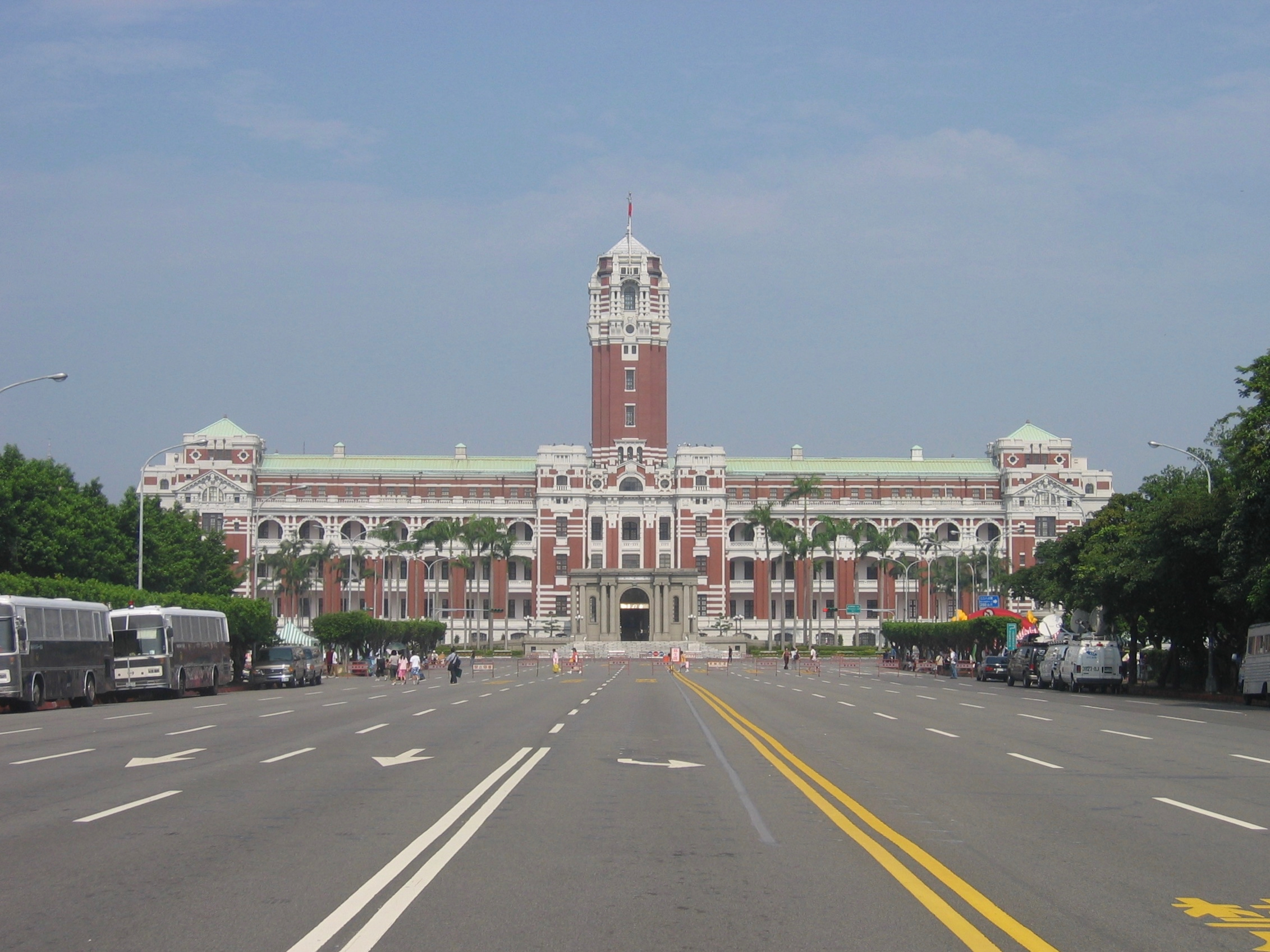
The Presidential Building in Zhongzheng District, Taipei, houses the office of the ROC president currently.

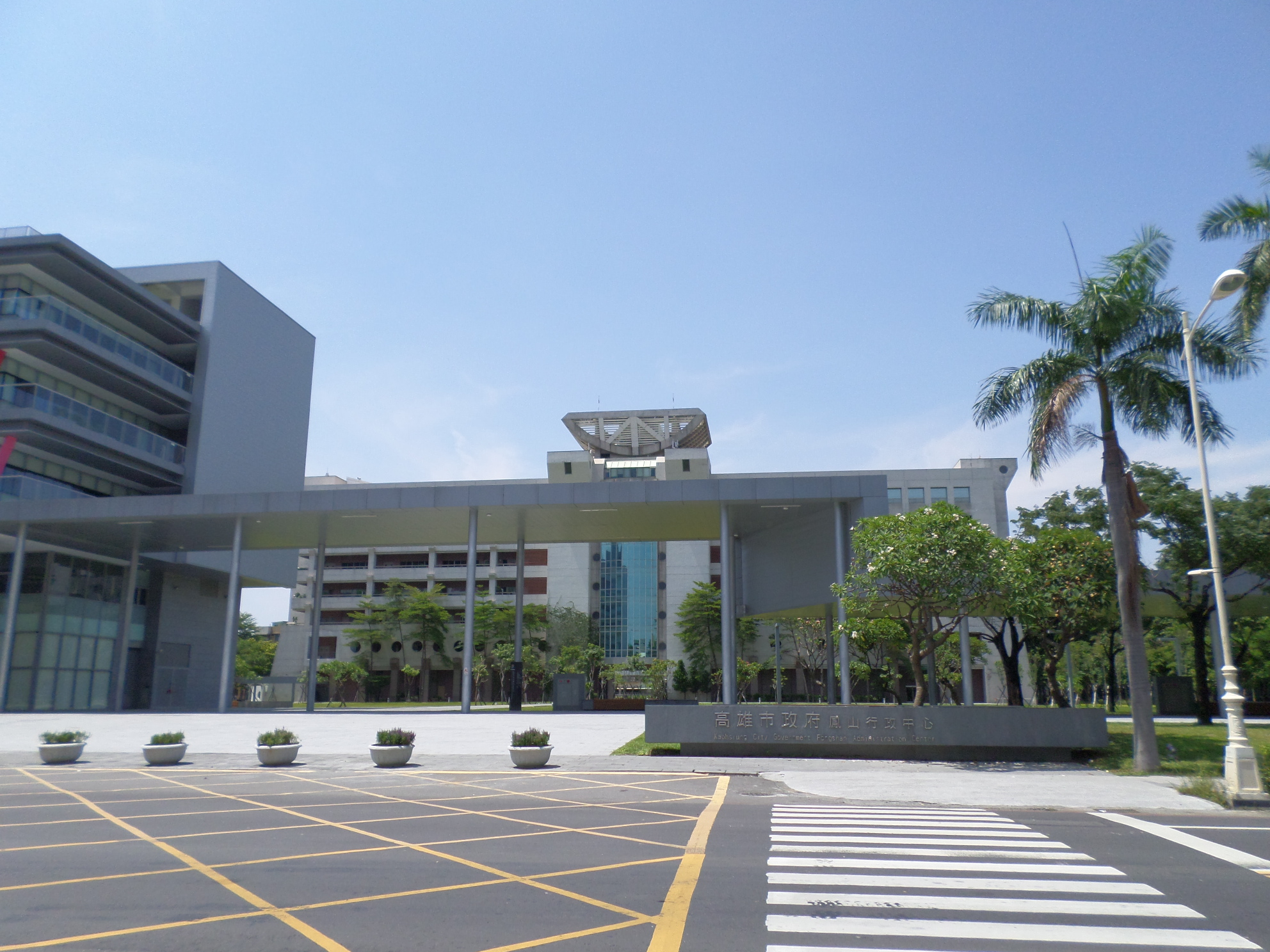
The Presidential Southern Office in Fengshan District, Kaohsiung, opened on 10 March 2017.

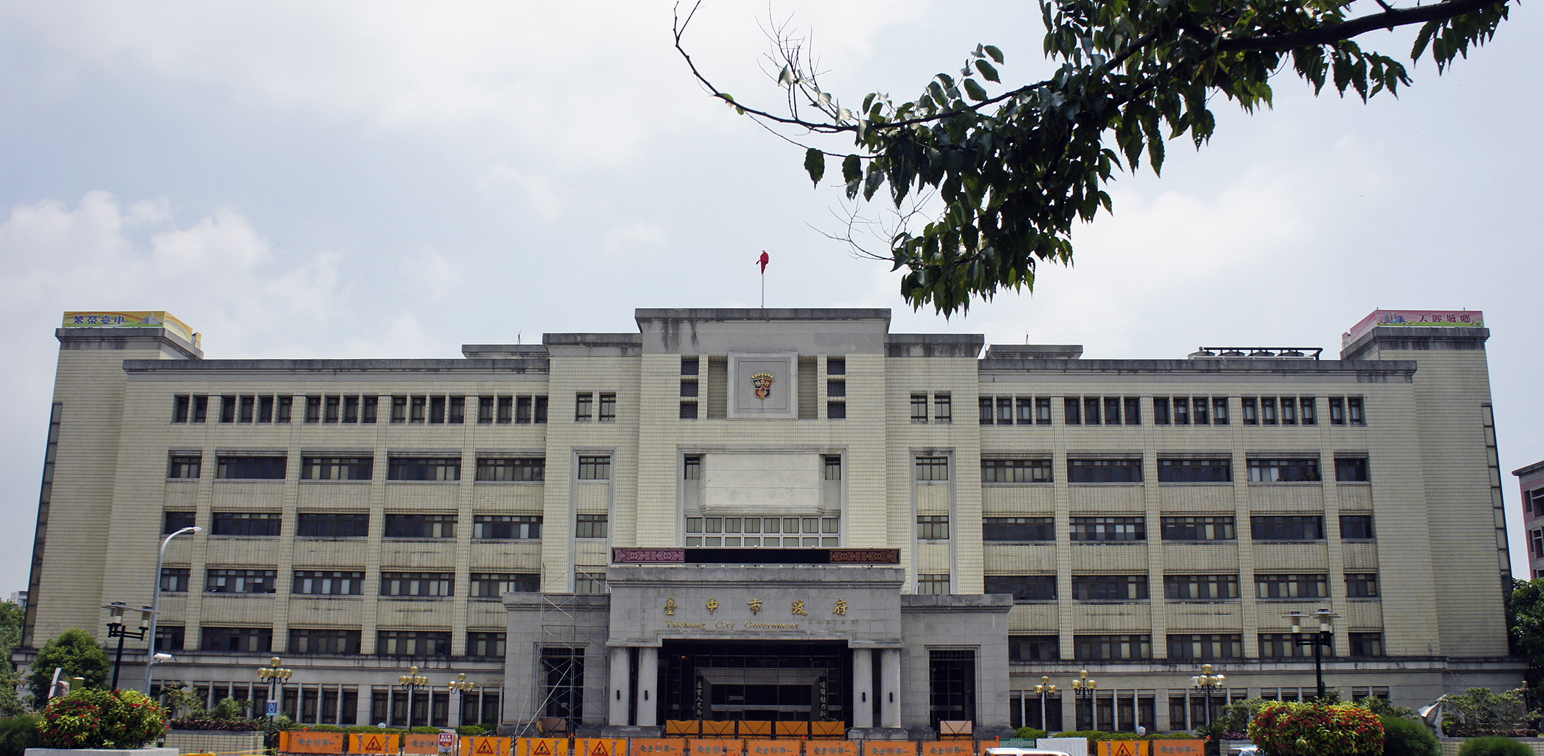
The Presidential Central Office in Fengyuan District, Taichung, opened on 18 March 2017.

== Diplomatic protocol ==
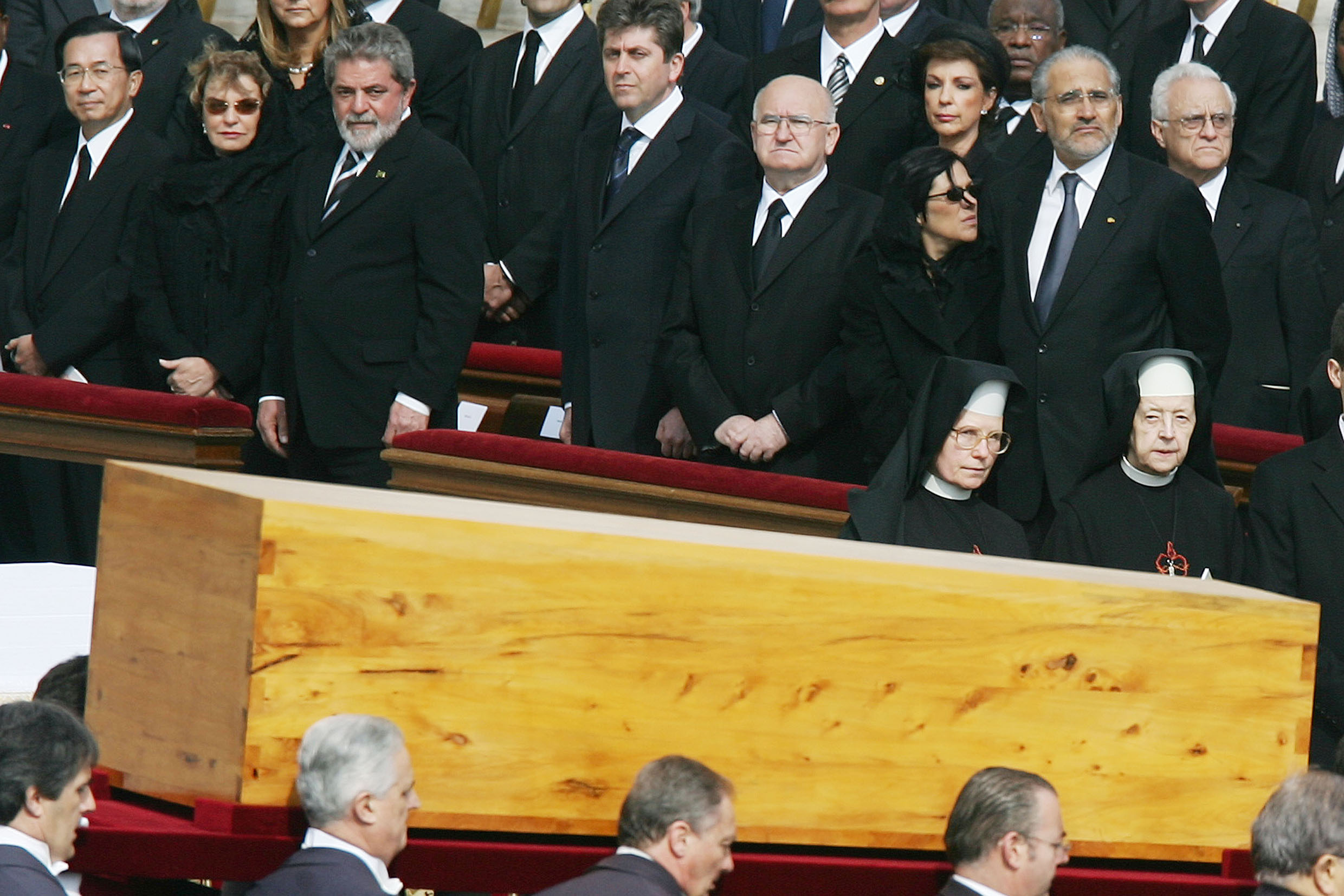
At the funeral of Pope John Paul II, President Chen Shui-bian (far left), whom the Holy See recognizes as the head of state of China, was seated in the front row (in French alphabetical order) beside the first lady and president of Brazil.

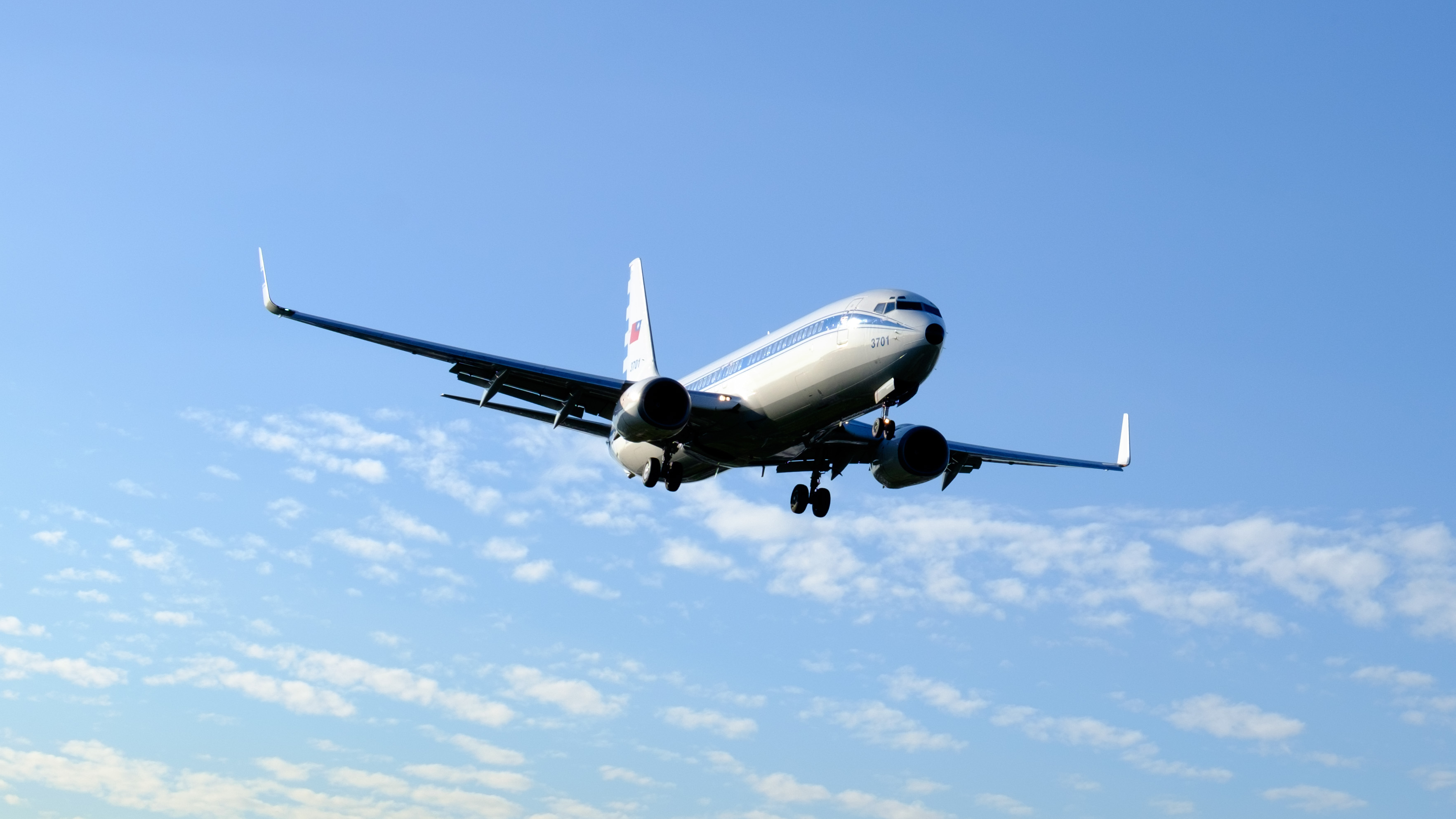
Air Force 3701, the presidential aircraft of Taiwan.

The diplomatic protocol regarding the President of the ROC is rather complex because of the political status of Taiwan. In the nations that have diplomatic relations with the ROC, the president is accorded the standard treatment that is given to a head of state. In other nations, the president is formally a private citizen, although even in these cases, travel usually meets with strong objections from the People's Republic of China.

The president of ROC has traveled several times to the United States, formally in transit to and from Central America, where a number of countries do recognize the ROC. This system allows the president to visit the United States without the US State Department having to issue a visa. During these trips, the president is not formally treated as a head of state, does not meet US government officials in their official capacities, and does not visit Washington, D.C. However, in these visits, the ROC president invariably meets with staff members from the US government, although these visits are with lower-ranking officials in non-governmental surroundings.

In the area of Southeast Asia, the ROC president was able to arrange visits in the early 1990s which were formally private tourist visits. However, these have become increasingly infrequent as a result of PRC pressure.

At the annual Asia-Pacific Economic Cooperation leaders' summit, the ROC president is forbidden from attending personally, and must send a special envoy to represent them at the event.

However, on 2 December 2016, US President-elect Donald Trump accepted a congratulatory telephone call from the ROC president, a clear break from prior protocol.

The Chinese Communist Party (CCP), the Government of the People's Republic of China and its media all use the terms Leader of the Taiwan Area, Leader of the Taiwan Region (traditional Chinese: 台灣地區領導人; simplified Chinese: 台湾地区领导人; pinyin: Táiwān dìqū lǐngdǎorén) and Leader of the Taiwanese Authorities (台灣當局領導人; 台湾当局领导人; Táiwān dāngjú lǐngdǎo rén) to describe Taiwan's head of state. These terms are used by the media in the People's Republic of China (PRC) to reflect the PRC's official stance of not recognizing the legitimacy of Taiwan as a country, or of Two Chinas. If the official title cannot be avoided in a news article, quotation marks would be used around terms for all official ROC positions and organizations.

== Secretary-general to the president ==
The secretary-general to the president is the highest-ranking official in the Office of the President and supervises the staff of the office. The current secretary-general is Pan Men-an.

== Symbols ==
Podium symbol used by the president

The president's podium bears the symbol of a golden plum blossom surrounded by wreath laurel on front side.

The presidential standard, officially called the Commander-in-Chief Standard of the Republic of China, is the symbol of the President as head the Republic of China Armed Forces. The Standard is a rectangular, red field with a thin, yellow border. In the center of the red field is the national emblem of the Republic of China. The Standard is flown from the Presidential Office, as well as other buildings for the president’s use; facilities for presidential visits; transportation vehicles when used by the president; and in other ceremonial contexts. The Standard was designed by Chiang Kai-shek in 1928, based on the flag of Whampoa Military Academy, which was in turn designed by Ho Ying-chin in 1924, and revised in 1988.

The Presidential Seal is square, and its inscription 總統之印 is written in seal script (篆書). It is written vertically in two columns, with the right-hand line containing the characters 總統 (Zǒngtǒng), and the left-hand line containing the characters 之印 (Zhīyìn).

== Elections ==
Electoral maps of direct presidential elections in Taiwan (until 2016).

Comparison of the vote percentages in the direct presidential elections. : Democratic Progressive Party candidates : Kuomintang candidates : People First Party candidates, or James Soong. : New Party nominated or endorsed candidates. : Taiwan People's Party candidates : Other independents

Order	Main article	Form of election
1st	1948 Chinese presidential election	Indirect election by the 1st National Assembly (delegates elected in 1947)
2nd	1954 Taiwanese presidential election	Indirect election by the 1st National Assembly (delegates elected in 1947)
3rd	1960 Taiwanese presidential election	Indirect election by the 1st National Assembly (delegates elected in 1947)
4th	1966 Taiwanese presidential election	Indirect election by the 1st National Assembly (delegates elected in 1947)
5th	1972 Taiwanese presidential election	Indirect election by the 1st National Assembly (delegates elected in 1947 and 1969)
6th	1978 Taiwanese presidential election	Indirect election by the 1st National Assembly (delegates elected in 1947, 1969, and 1972)
7th	1984 Taiwanese presidential election	Indirect election by the 1st National Assembly (delegates elected in 1947, 1969, and 1980)
8th	1990 Taiwanese presidential election	Indirect election by the 1st National Assembly (delegates elected in 1947, 1969, and 1986)
9th	1996 Taiwanese presidential election	Direct election by Taiwanese people (citizens of the Free area)
10th	2000 Taiwanese presidential election	Direct election by Taiwanese people (citizens of the Free area)
11th	2004 Taiwanese presidential election	Direct election by Taiwanese people (citizens of the Free area)
12th	2008 Taiwanese presidential election	Direct election by Taiwanese people (citizens of the Free area)
13th	2012 Taiwanese presidential election	Direct election by Taiwanese people (citizens of the Free area)
14th	2016 Taiwanese presidential election	Direct election by Taiwanese people (citizens of the Free area)
15th	2020 Taiwanese presidential election	Direct election by Taiwanese people (citizens of the Free area)
16th	2024 Taiwanese presidential election	Direct election by Taiwanese people (citizens of the Free area)

== History ==
Taiwan was previously led by the emperor of Japan during colonial rule by Japan from 1895 to 1945, represented by the governor-general of Taiwan.

After the outbreak of the Wuchang Uprising against Qing rule in 1911, the revolutionaries elected Sun Yat-sen as the "provisional president" (臨時大總統) of the transitional government, with the Republic of China officially established on 1 January 1912. But Sun soon resigned from the provisional presidency in favor of Yuan Shikai, who assumed the title "Great President" (大總統) in March 1912. Yuan induced the Last Emperor to abdicate, ending thousands of years of imperial rule in China. The 1913 Constitution called for a strong presidential system with notable checks on the president by the National Assembly. However, Yuan soon began to assert dictatorial power, ignoring the National Assembly and later abolishing it altogether. In 1915, Yuan proclaimed himself Emperor of China in a largely unpopular move and was forced to retract his declaration shortly before his death in 1916.

With Yuan Shikai's death the Warlord Era began. Vice President Li Yuanhong succeeded Yuan as president and attempted to reassert the constitutional government, but was soon forced to resign by military strongmen. The presidency, though leading an internationally recognized government, was thereafter to be headed by a series of prominent warlords. This presidency ended in 1928 when the Northern Expedition, led by the Kuomintang (KMT), succeeded in conquering North China.

Sun Yat-sen established a rival (military, not constitutional) government in Guangzhou in 1917 and took the title of "Generalissimo of the Military Government" (海陸軍大元帥; 'Grand Marshal of the Navy and Army'). He was ousted in 1918 but returned again to Guangzhou in 1921. Claiming to restore the Provisional Constitution of the Republic of China, he summoned the members of the original parliament to elect him as president, but since there lacked a quorum, he took the title of "Extraordinary President" (非常大總統). Sun, again expelled from Guangzhou in 1922, returned in 1923 to take the title of "Generalissimo of the Military Government." Sun died in 1925 with no clear successor and leadership of the government, now named the National Government, rested in a series of Leninist-style dual party and state committees, the most powerful of which was the policy-making Central Executive Committee of the Kuomintang. The government was organized into five branches, with the Executive Yuan, headed by the premier, holding primary administrative authority. The "Chairman of the National Government", though not given specific presidential powers, took on the functions of a de facto head of state and its official English translation was "President of the National Government of the Republic of China". This form of government under the KMT lasted through the Northern Expedition, which moved the capital to Nanjing and gave the National Government domestic control and foreign recognition, and the Second Sino-Japanese War, during which the Japanese established a puppet "Reorganized" National Government with almost the identical organizational structure, until the promulgation of a new Constitution in 1947.

Following the Chinese victory in the Second Sino-Japanese War, the National Government under Chiang Kai-shek was restored in Nanjing and the KMT set out to enact a liberal democratic constitution in line with the last stage of Sun Yat-sen's three stages of national development. The new Constitution of the Republic of China, promulgated on 25 December 1947, established a five-branch government with the office of president (總統) as head of state. On 20 May 1948, Chiang Kai-shek was formally elected by the National Assembly to be the first term president.

After the KMT lost mainland China in the Chinese Civil War, the government was evacuated to Taiwan, where the term limits for the president specified in the 1947 constitution were suspended after 1960. (Note: According to the Constitution, the president can be reelected once. The term length is six years. Since the constitution was suspended, president Chiang Kai-shek continued to be elected until his death.) In 1954, as the term of the first National Assembly were about to expire, the Judicial Yuan ruled that the expired seats of the National Assembly would continue in power until the respective delegate region elections could be held. This largely froze the membership of the National Assembly mainland delegates and prevented local Taiwanese from widespread legislative and assembly participation in the expired mainland seats until the early 1970s. The members of the National Assembly continued in their office until 1991, and continued to elect Chiang Kai-shek as president until his death in 1975.

Presidents were elected by the National Assembly until the first direct presidential election in 1996, while the term length was shortened from six to four years.

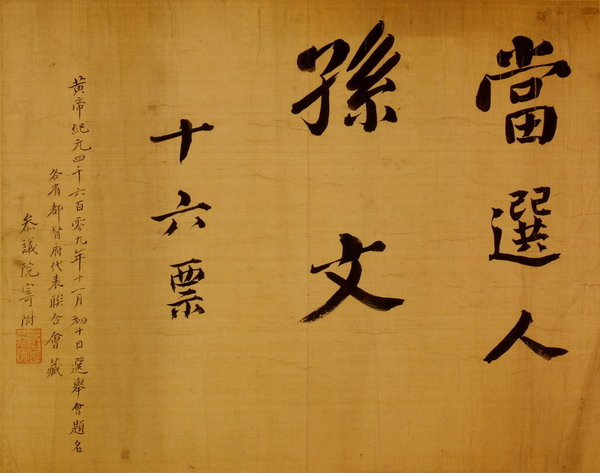
Official results of the election announcing Sun's election on November 10, 1911.

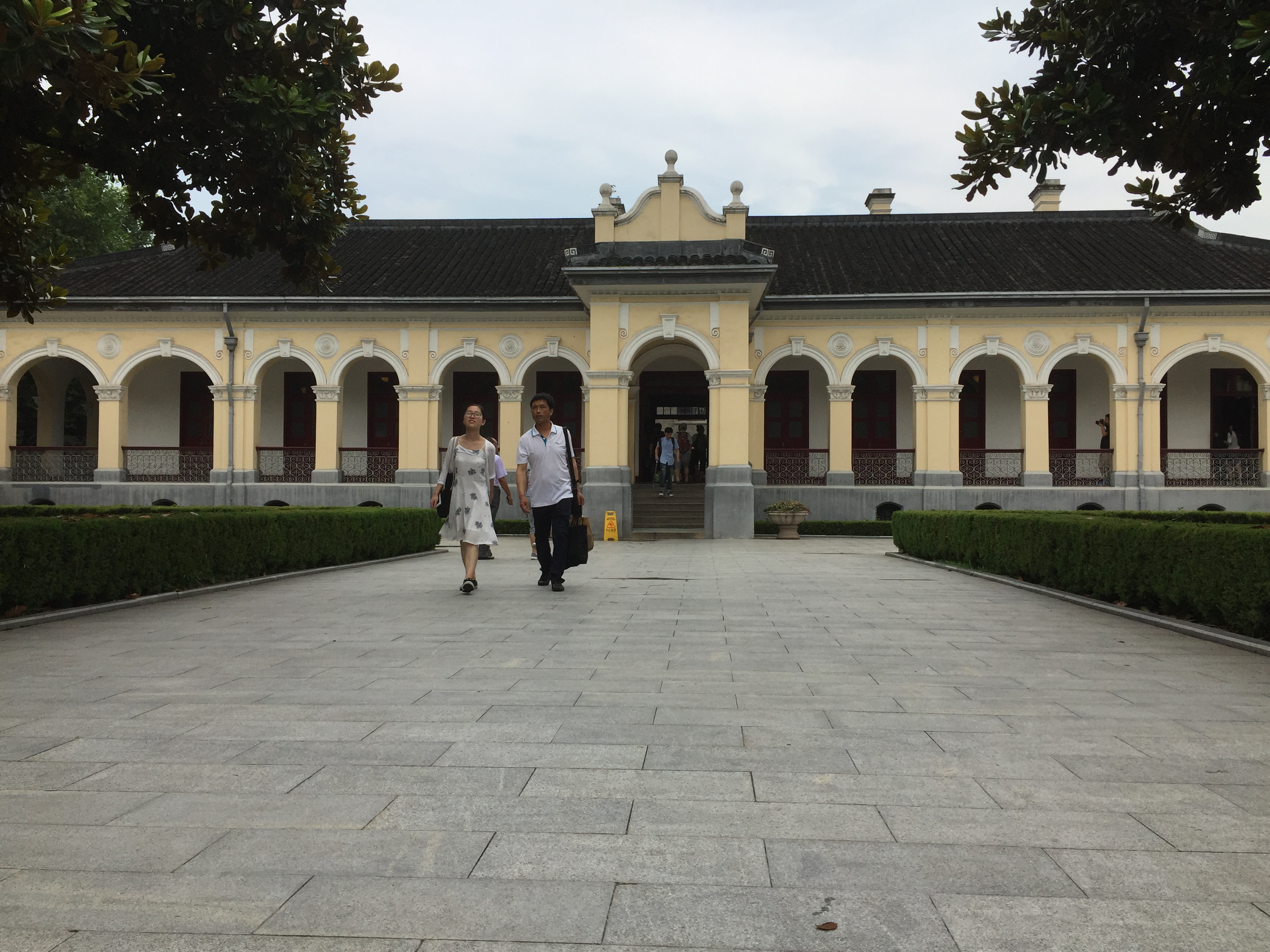
The West Garden Hall in Presidential Palace, Nanjing, was the office of the provisional president in 1912.

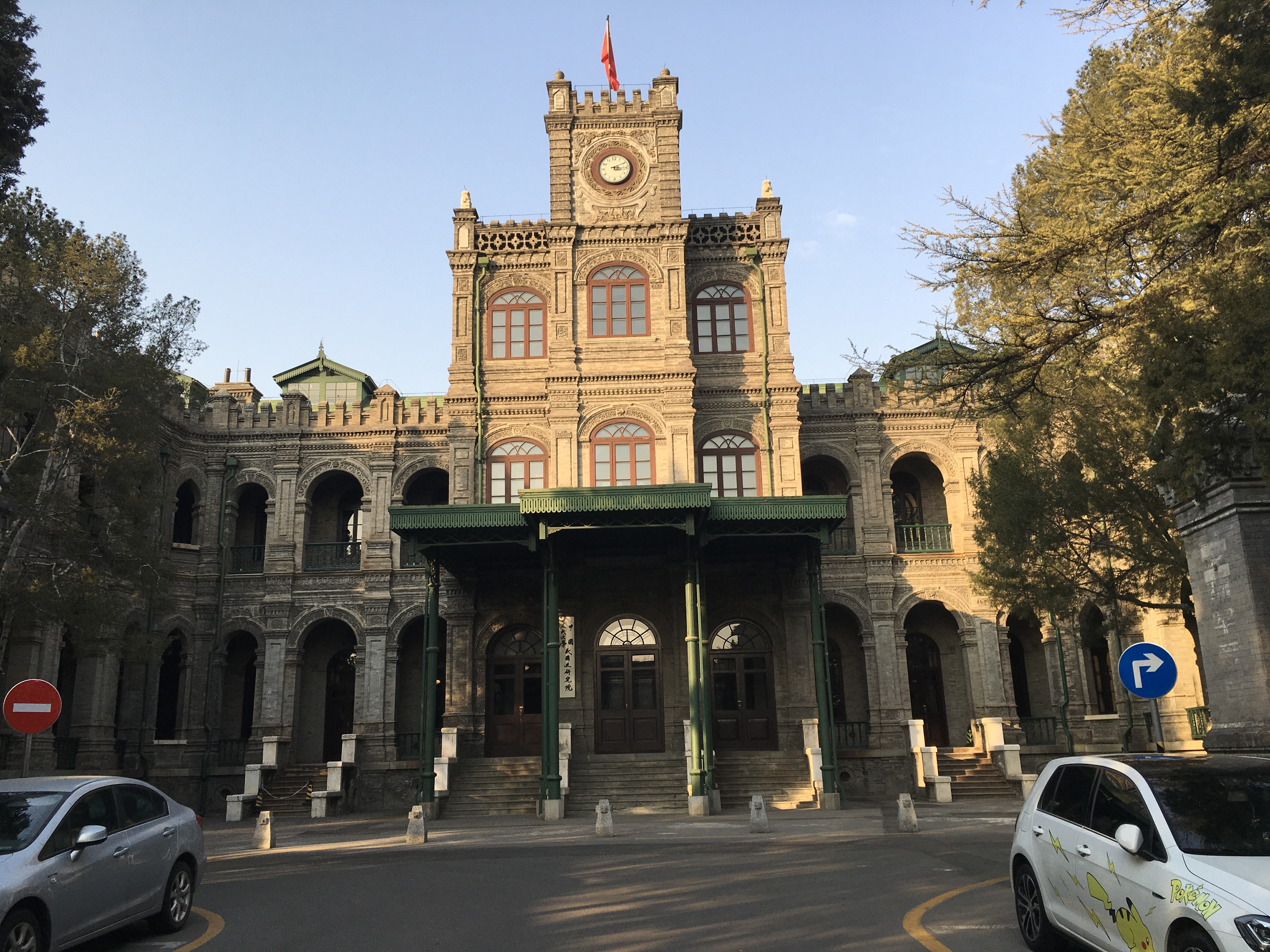
After Yuan Shikai's Peiyang Government took control of the ROC, the house in Peking was the office of the president.

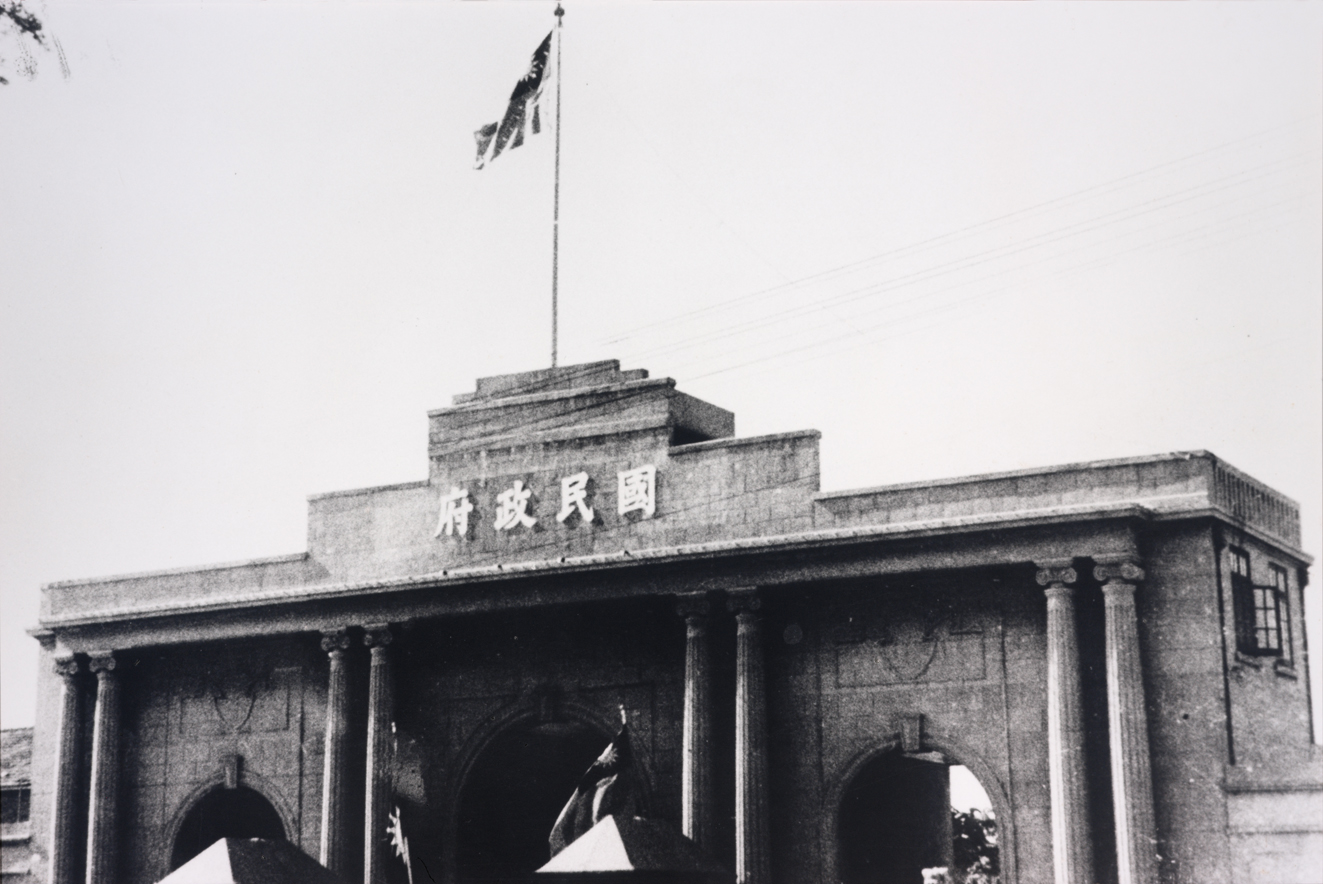
The Presidential Palace in Xuanwu District, Nanjing, housed the office of the chairman of the National Government of the ROC in 1927–1937.

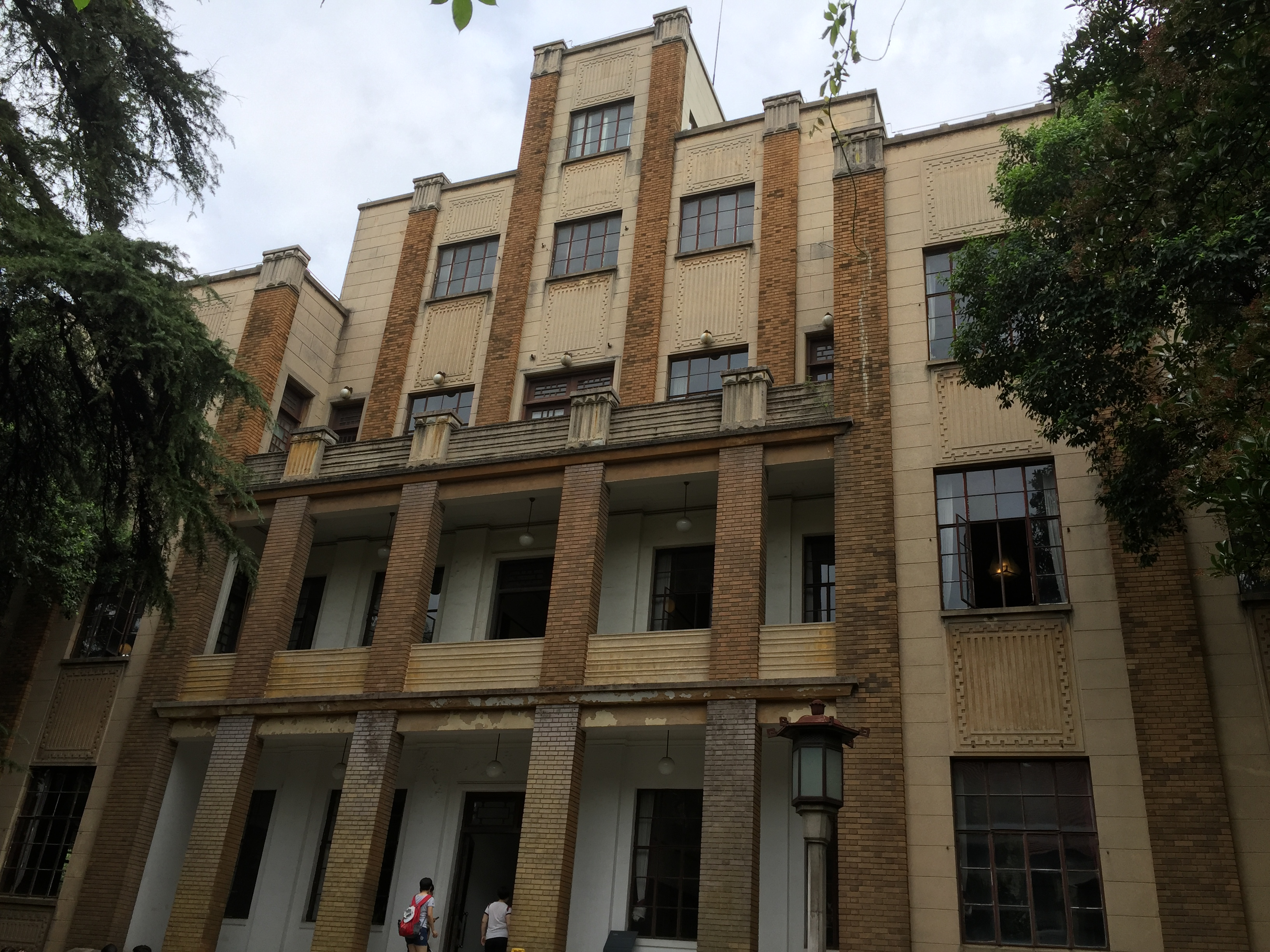
The Presidential Building in Presidential Palace, Nanjing, was the office of the president of the ROC after the 1947 Chinese Constitution, until the Government of the ROC fled to Taiwan in 1949.

== Timeline of presidents ==
- Cen Chunxuan was the president of the southern military government of the Republic of China from 1913 to 1921.

1st Provisional President and Presidents after the 1947 Constitution

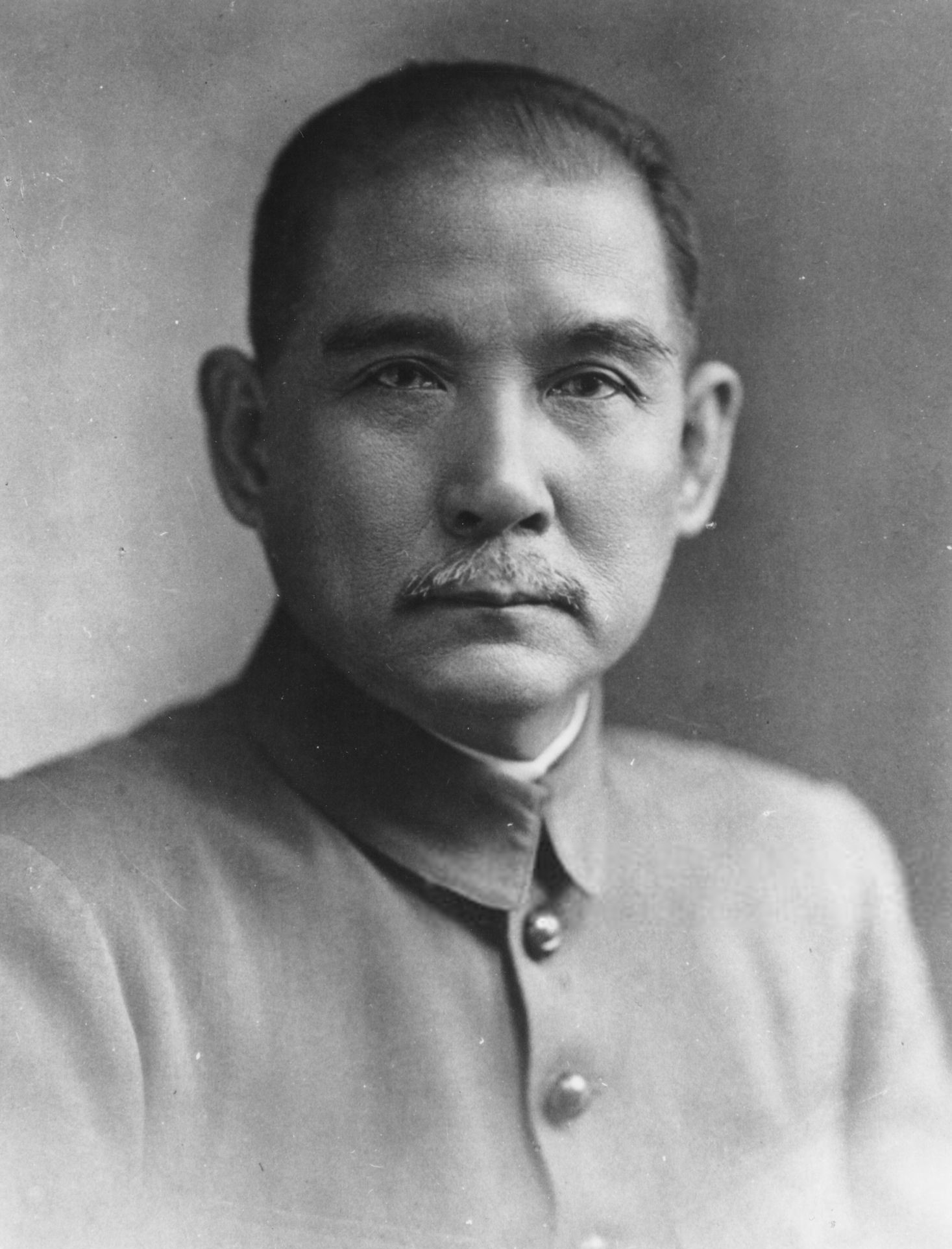
Sun Yat-sen
1st Provisional President
(served: 1912)

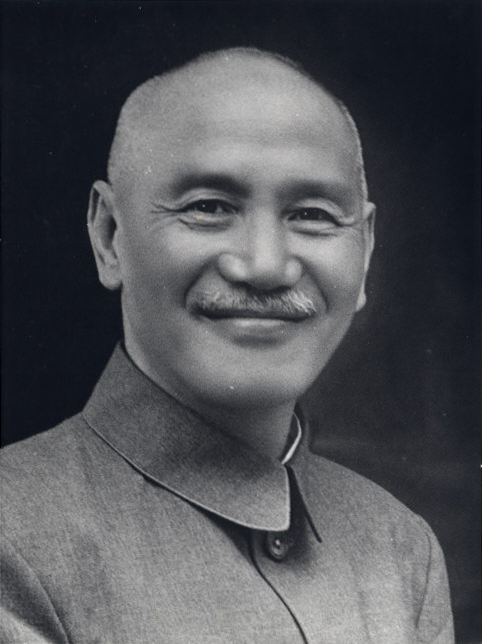
1st: Chiang Kai-shek
1st, 2nd, 3rd, 4th, & 5th terms
(served: 1948–1975)

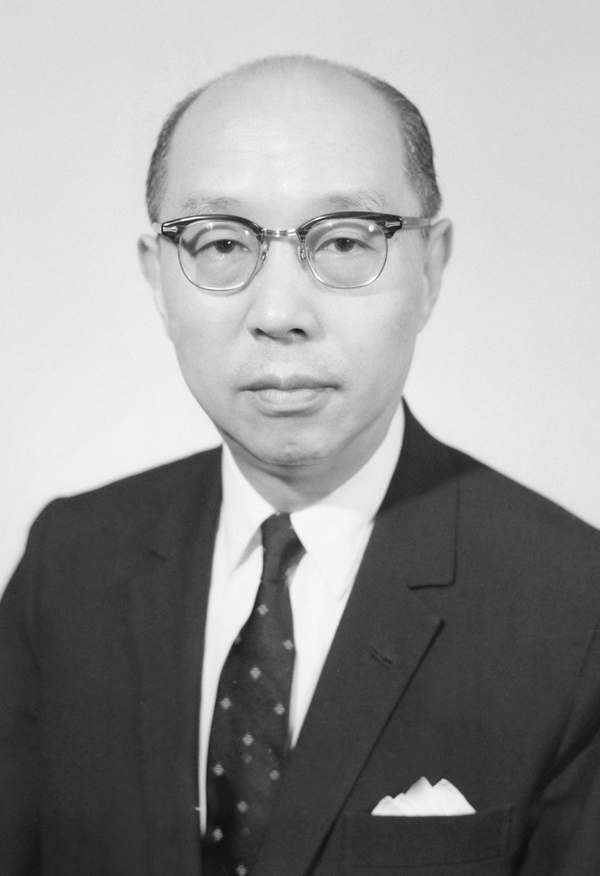
2nd: Yen Chia-kan
remaining 5th term
(served: 1975–1978)

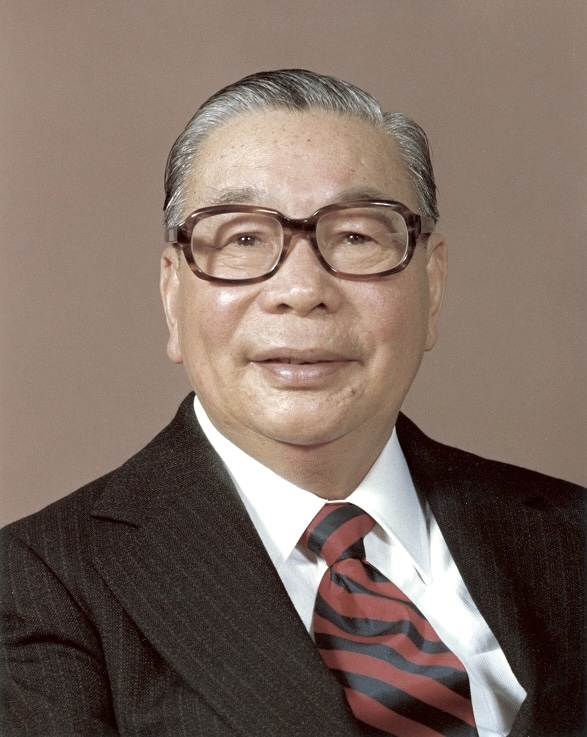
3rd: Chiang Ching-kuo
6th & 7th terms
(served: 1978–1988)

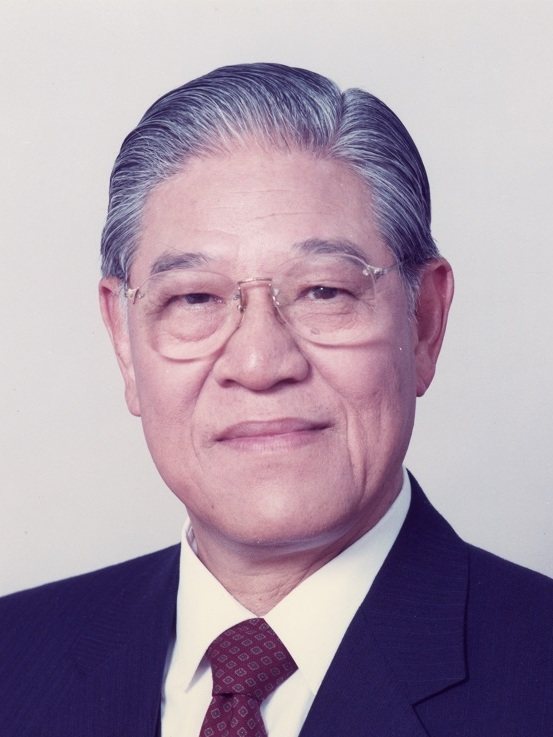
4th: Lee Teng-hui
remaining 7th term, then 8th & 9th terms
(served: 1988–2000)

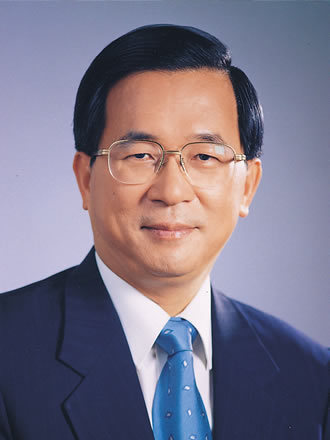
5th: Chen Shui-bian
10th & 11th terms
(served: 2000–2008)

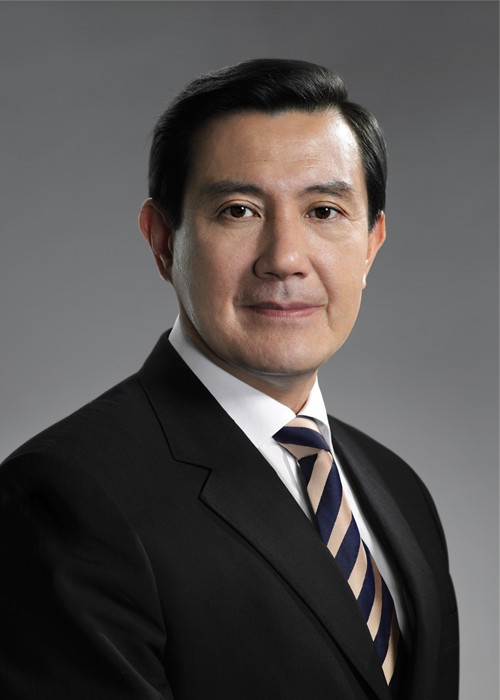
6th: Ma Ying-jeou
12th & 13th terms
(served: 2008–2016)

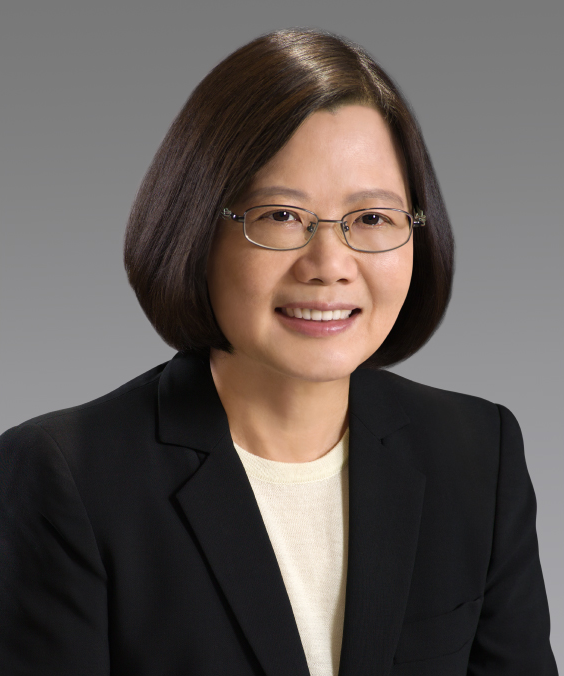
7th: Tsai Ing-wen
14th & 15th terms
(served: 2016–2024)

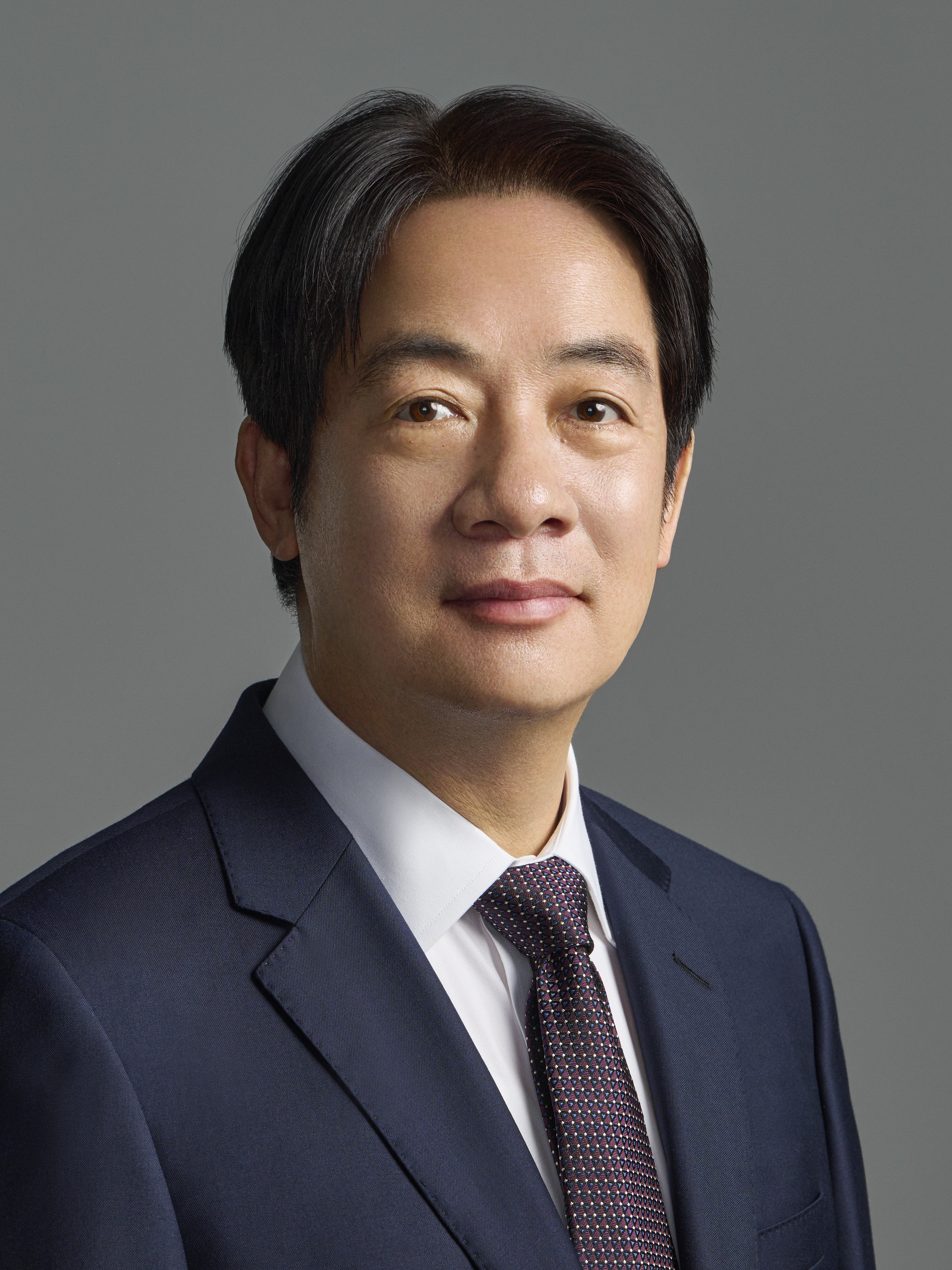
8th: Lai Ching-te
16th term
(serving: 2024–present)

== See also ==
- Elections in Taiwan
- History of Taiwan
- Vice President of the Republic of China
- Premier of the Republic of China
- List of presidents of the Republic of China
- Politics of the Republic of China
- List of political parties in the Republic of China
- List of rulers of Taiwan
- Republic of China Presidential Museum
