= Wuchang Uprising =

1911 revolt against Qing rule in China

- Part of the 1911 Revolution
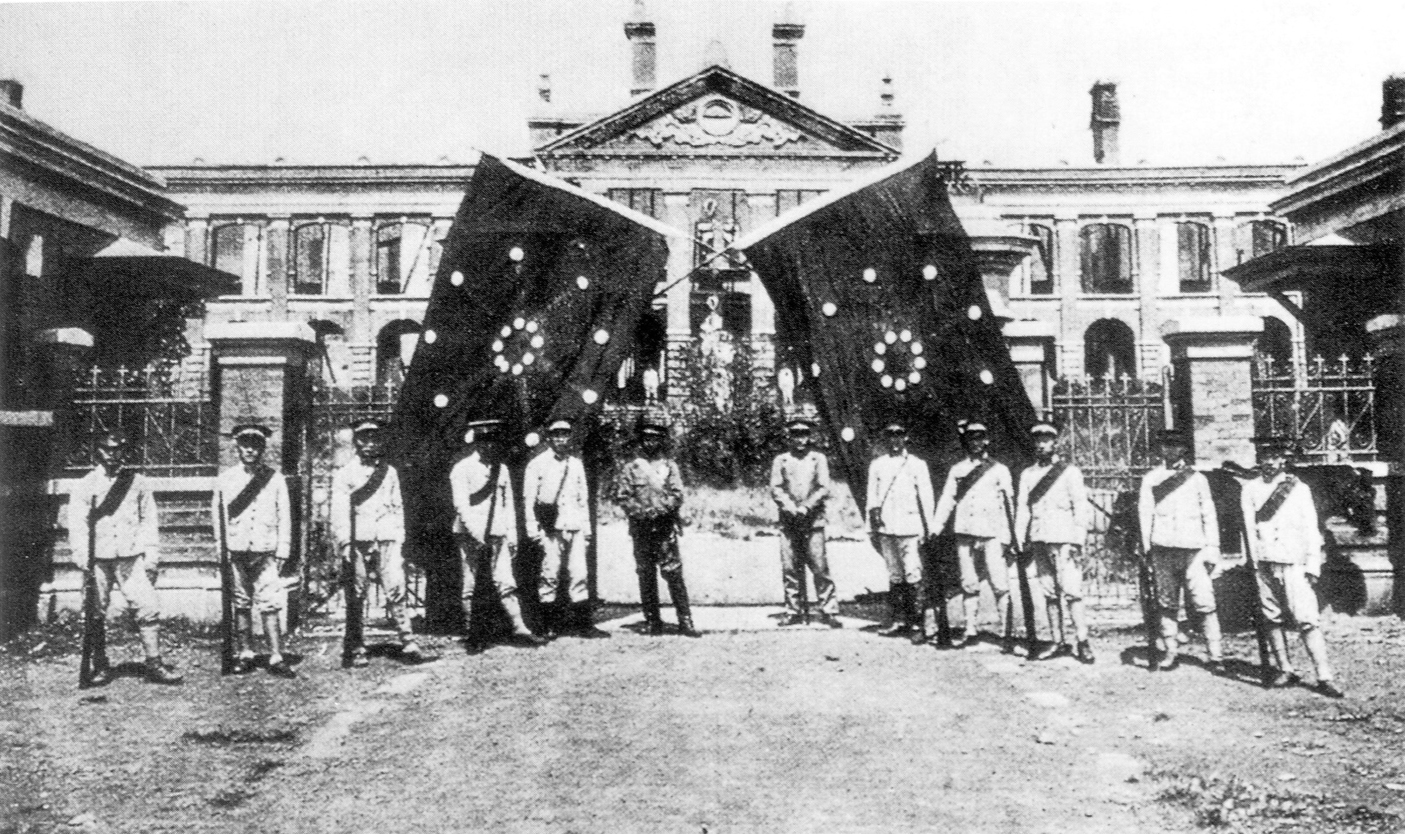
- Establishment of the Hubei Military Government
Date	10 October 1911 – 1 December 1911 (1 month and 21 days)
Location	Wuchang, Hubei, China
Result	Qing victory; Increase in support for revolutionaries throughout China; Beginning of the 1911 Revolution

Belligerents
Qing dynasty	Tongmenghui; Hubei Military Government

Commanders and leaders
(Qing dynasty) Ruicheng; (Qing dynasty) Zhang Biao; (Qing dynasty) Yuan Shikai	Huang Xing; Jiang Yiwu; Sun Wu; Xiong Bingkun; Li Yuanhong

Strength
60,000 troops (the combined strength of four Beiyang Army divisions and the Imperial Guard)	20,000 revolutionaries (mostly student armies and civilians from the three towns of Wuhan)

Casualties and losses
~8,000 killed	~4,000 killed

Chinese name
- Traditional Chinese: 武昌起義
- Simplified Chinese: 武昌起义
- Hanyu Pinyin: Wǔchāng qǐyì
Transcriptions
Standard Mandarin
- Hanyu Pinyin: Wǔchāng qǐyì
- Bopomofo: ㄨˇ ㄔㄤ ㄑㄧˇ ㄧˋ
- Wade–Giles: Wu^{3}-chʻang^{1} Chʻi^{3}-i^{4}
- Tongyong Pinyin: Wǔchang cǐyì
- IPA: [ù.ʈʂʰáŋ tɕʰì.î]
Yue: Cantonese
- Yale Romanization: Móuh chēung héi yih
- Jyutping: Mou5 coeng1 hei2 ji6
- IPA: [mɔw˩˧ tsʰœŋ˥ hej˧˥ ji˨]
Southern Min
- Hokkien POJ: Bú-chhiong khí-gī

The Wuchang Uprising was an armed rebellion against the ruling Qing dynasty that took place in Wuchang (now Wuchang District of Wuhan) in the Chinese province of Hubei on 10 October 1911, beginning the 1911 Revolution that successfully overthrew China's last imperial dynasty, the Qing dynasty. It was led by elements of the New Army, influenced by revolutionary ideas from Tongmenghui. The uprising and the eventual revolution led to the downfall of the Qing dynasty after almost three centuries of imperial rule and the establishment of the Republic of China (ROC). Taiwan commemorates the anniversary of the uprising's outbreak on 10 October as the National Day of the Republic of China.

The uprising originated from popular unrest about a railway crisis, and the planning process took advantage of the situation. On 10 October 1911, the New Army stationed in Wuchang launched an assault on the residence of the Viceroy of Huguang. The viceroy, Ruicheng, quickly fled from the residence, and the revolutionaries soon took control of the entire city.

== Background ==
=== Tongmenghui ===
In 1895, China was decisively defeated by Japan in the First Sino-Japanese War. Intellectuals in China were divided into several factions. Constitutional monarchist reformers led by Kang Youwei and Liang Qichao took control initially and orchestrated the Hundred Days' Reform in the Qing government. The reforms failed due to the Wuxu Coup by Empress Dowager Cixi. Disillusioned with the monarchy and the Qing government, many revolutionary groups began emerging across the country. In 1905, revolutionary leaders such as Sun Yat-sen and Song Jiaoren met in Tokyo to discuss a merger between different revolutionary groups. A new group known as Tongmenghui was formed after this meeting.

=== Railway Protection Movement ===
After the Boxer Rebellion, many Western powers saw railway investments as part of the consolidation in their spheres of influence over China. Railway constructions took place across Shandong, the Yangtze, Kunming and Manchuria. Provincial governments, with permission from the Qing court, also started to construct their own railways. The Guangzhou-Hankou Railway and Sichuan-Hankou Railway were under the oversight of Guangdong, Hunan, Hubei and Sichuan. Faced with ongoing financial struggles, partly due to ongoing indemnity payments from the Boxer Protocol, the Qing court turned to Sheng Xuanhuai in 1910, a "classic bureaucratic capitalist", and adhered to his policy of securing foreign loans through the nationalization of all railway lines. This policy was met with stiff resistance, particularly in Sichuan, and the resistance quickly turned into a movement known as the Sichuan Railway Protection Movement. In response, the Qing court suppressed the unrest by force, contributing to the declining popularity of its government. By 11 August there were massive strikes and rallies in Chengdu. On 7 September the Viceroy of Sichuan, Zhao Erfeng, was asked to "intervene vigorously", and he ordered the arrest of key leaders in the Railway Protection League, then ordered troops to open fire on the protesters. Subsequent fighting around Chengdu prompted the diversion of troops to Sichuan from central China, which later became an important factor in the Wuchang Uprising's success.

Meanwhile, inaction toward nationalization of railway lines in both Hunan and Hubei were criticized by the local press. Confidence in the Qing government among the populace continued to deteriorate in response to the escalation of the railway crisis.

== Prelude ==
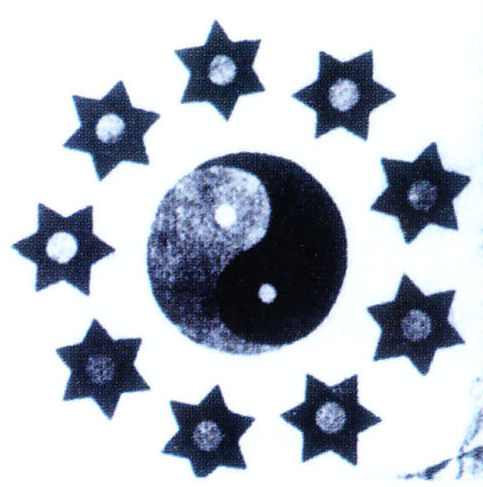
Wuchang military nine-star flag, with the Taijitu symbol in the middle

There were two revolutionary groups in the Wuhan area, the Wenxueshe (Literary Society) and the Gongjinhui (Progressive Association). These groups, led by Jiang Yiwu and Sun Wu respectively, worked closely together as commander and chief of staff of the revolutionary efforts in Wuhan. Beginning in September 1911, these two groups began negotiating with the Tongmenghui for possible collaboration in the next uprising. The date was originally set for 6 October, on the Mid-Autumn festival. The date was later postponed, due to inadequate preparations. On 9 October, while Sun Wu was supervising the making of explosive devices in the Russian concession in Hankou, one of the devices exploded unexpectedly, inflicting serious injuries on Sun. When he was hospitalized, the hospital staff discovered his identity and alerted the Qing authorities.

== New Army mutiny ==
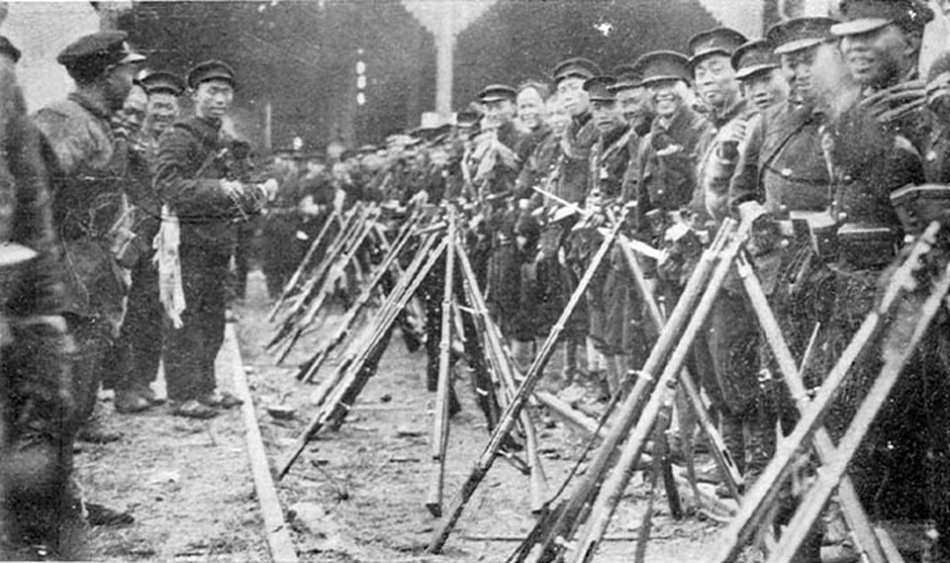
Revolutionary soldiers organized and prepared to attack in Hankou, October, 1911

With their identities revealed, the revolutionaries in the New Army stationed in Wuchang were facing imminent arrest by the Qing authorities. The decision was made by Jiang Yiwu of the Wenxueshe to immediately launch the uprising, but the plot was leaked to the Viceroy of Huguang, Ruicheng, and he ordered a crackdown of the revolutionaries, arresting and executing several prominent members.

On the evening of 10 October, Wu Zhaolin as provisional commander led the revolutionary elements of the New Army and staged a mutiny against the Qing garrison in Huguang, capturing the residence of the Viceroy along with securing strategic points in the city after intense fighting. As the Viceroy escaped, the Qing garrison fell into disarray. Between the night of 10 October and noon of 11th, "more than 500 Manchu soldiers were killed" with "over 300 captured".

== Establishment of the Hubei military government ==
On 11 October, the mutineers established a military government representing the Hubei province, and persuaded one of the high-ranking officers in the New Army, Li Yuanhong, to be the temporary leader. Li was initially resistant to the idea, but he was eventually convinced by the mutineers after they approached him. The newly established military government were able to confirm that foreign powers would not intervene in the uprising, and they went on to raise the "iron blood 18-star flag" while signaling for the other provinces to follow their suit. On 12 October, the revolutionaries marched toward the rest of the province, capturing Hankou and Hanyang in the process.

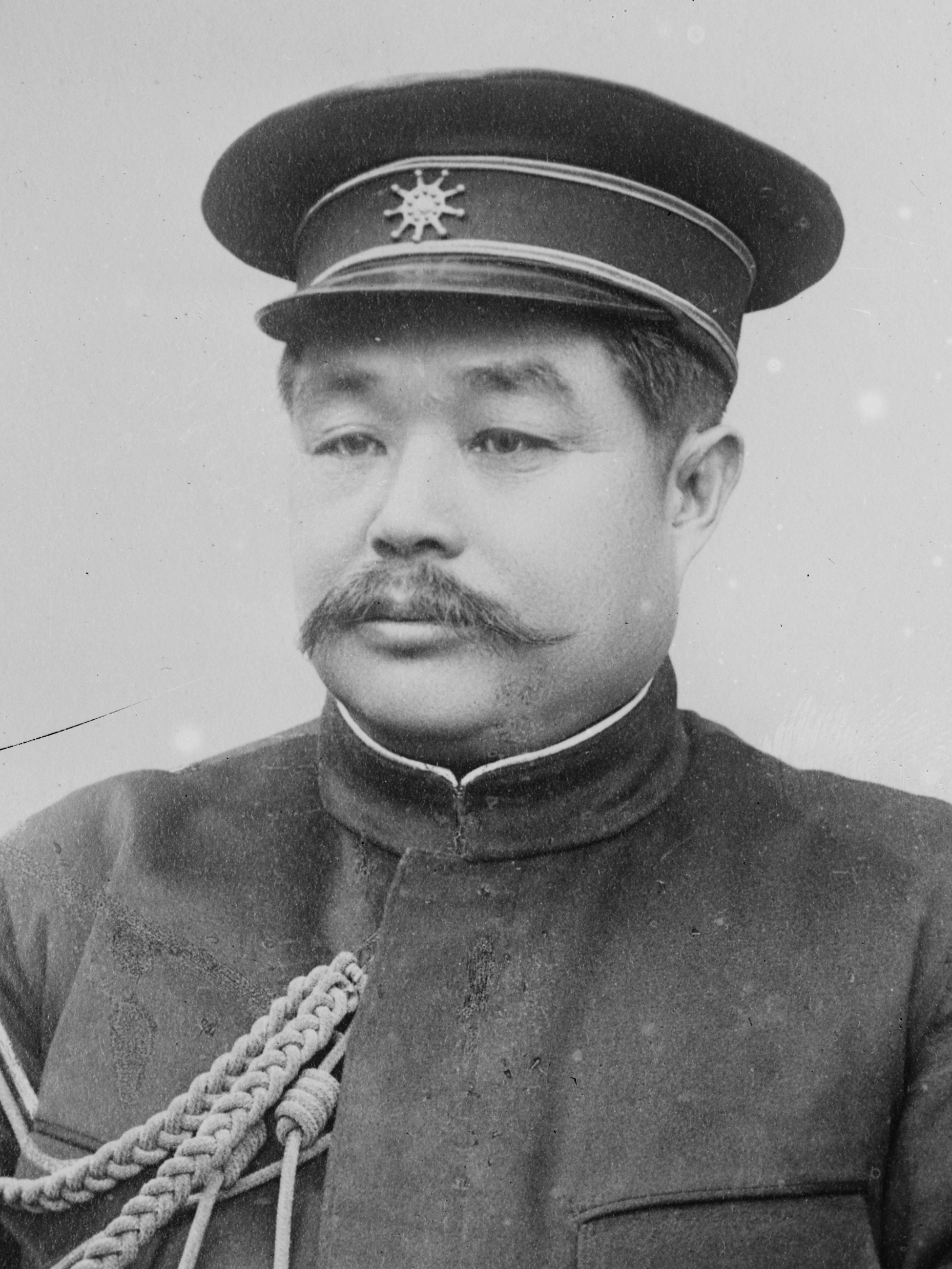
Li Yuanhong, temporary leader of the military government

Banner of the Wuchang Uprising, later used as the flag of the Republic of China army from 1913 to 1928

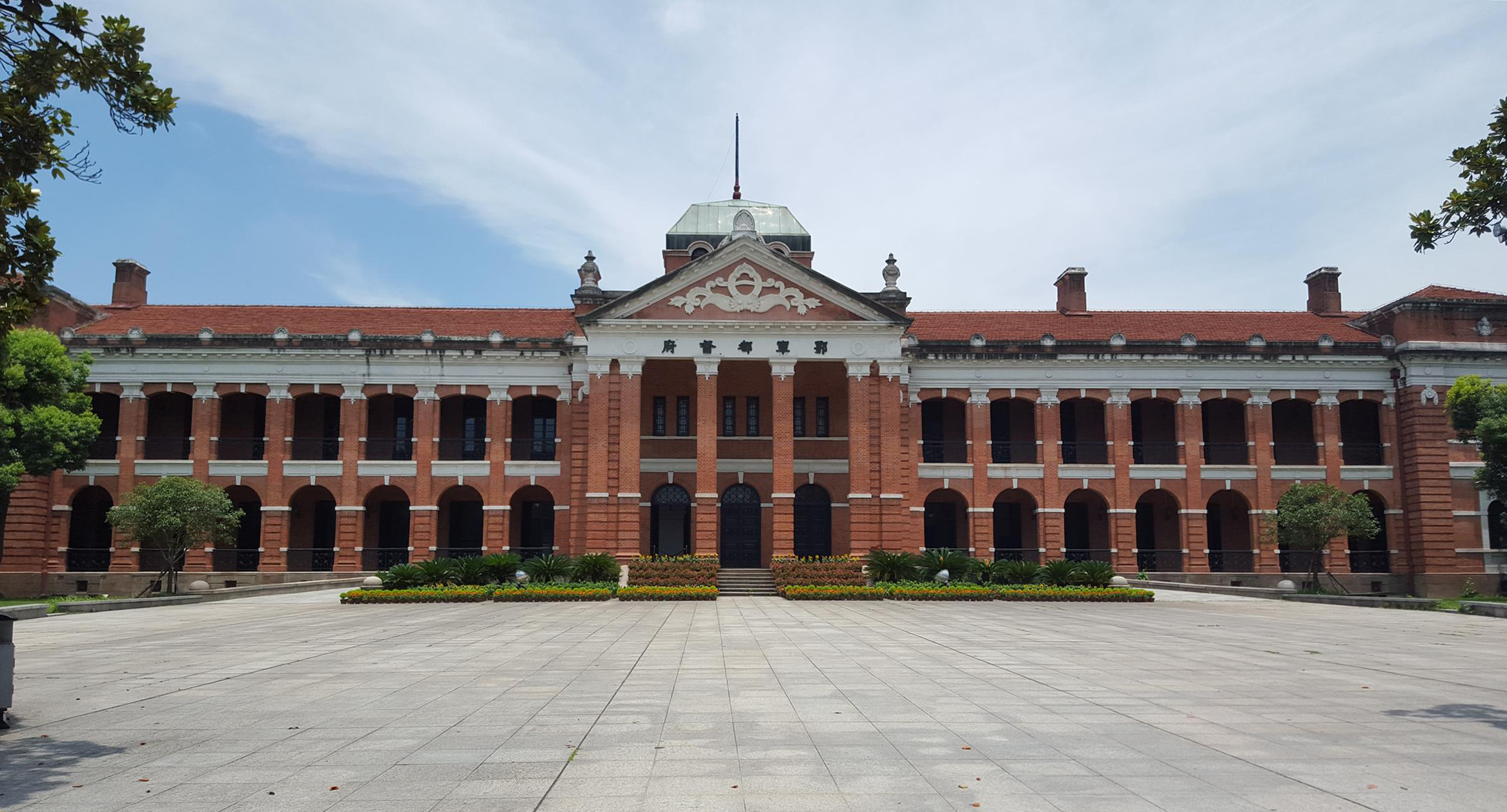
Former Hubei Military Governor's Office, now the Xinhai Revolution Museum

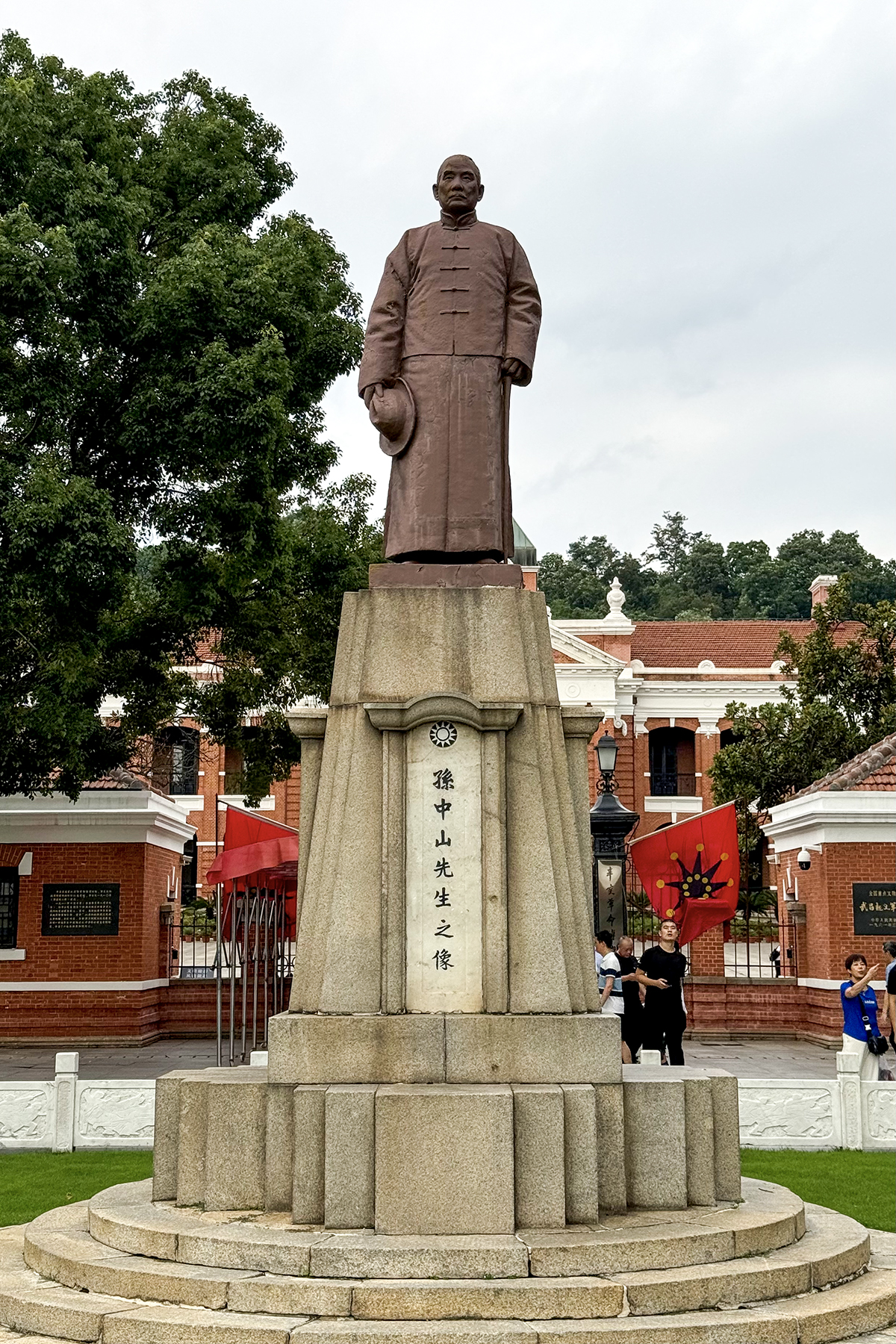
Sun Yat-sen's statue at the First Uprising Plaza of Wuhan in front of the former Hubei military government building

== Battle of Yangxia ==
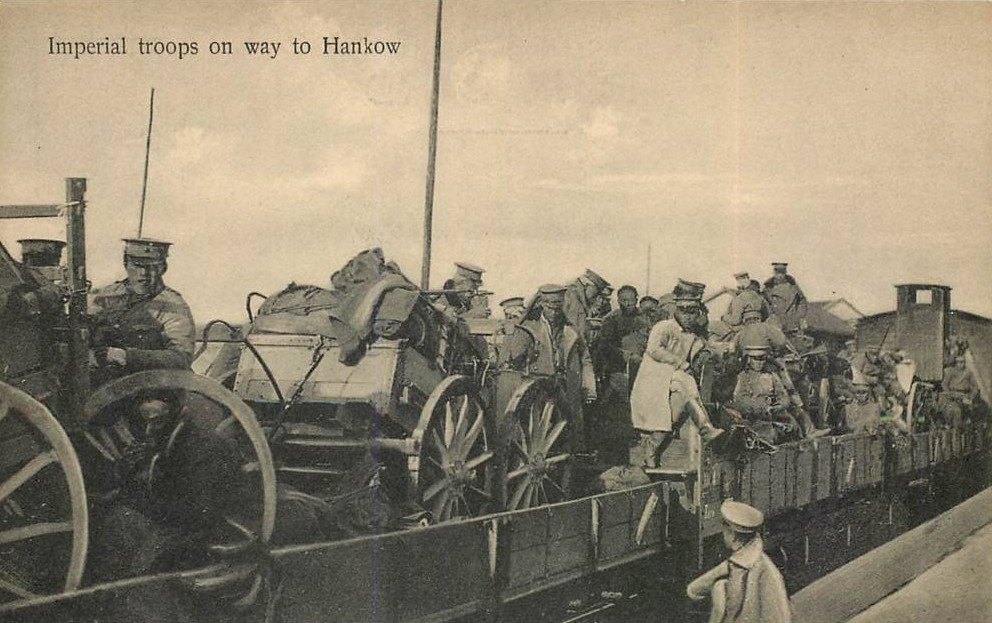
Beiyang Army on the way to Hankou, 1911

In response to the uprising, the Qing government called for the help of Yuan Shikai and the Beiyang Army to march toward Wuchang. For the revolutionaries, Huang Xing would arrive at Wuhan in early November to take over the command. Positions of revolutionary forces in Wuhan were subsequently attacked by the Beiyang Army, and the imperial troops were soon able to recapture Hankou on 1 November and Hanyang on 27 November. The offensive was halted after the capture of these two positions, as Yuan Shikai began to secretly negotiate with the revolutionaries.

== Aftermath ==
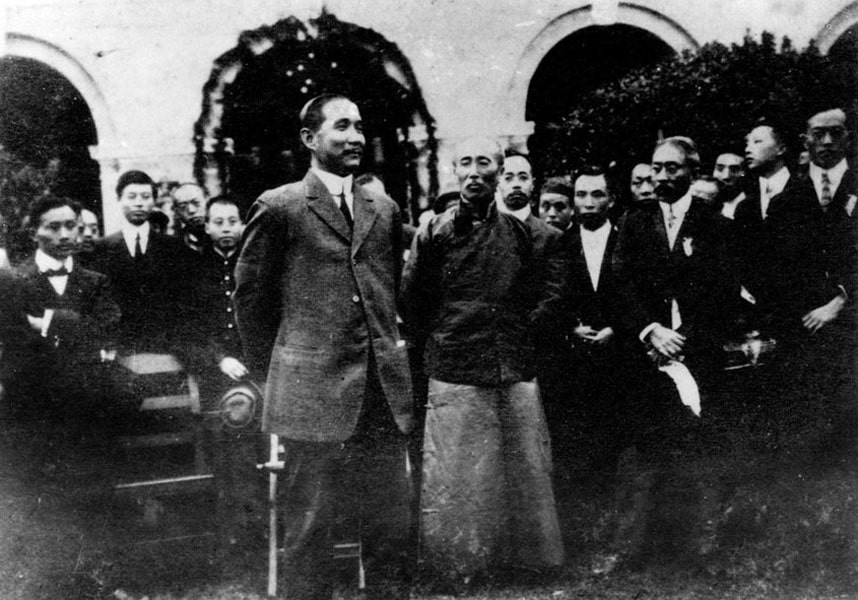
On October 10, 1912, Sun Yat-sen attended the anniversary commemoration of the Wuchang Uprising organized by the Global Chinese Students’ Association in Shanghai and delivered a speech; to his left was Wu Tingfang.

The Wuchang Uprising took many revolutionary leaders by surprise; Huang Xing and Song Jiaoren were unable to reach Wuchang in time. Sun Yat-sen was traveling in the United States speaking to overseas Chinese to appeal for financial support when the uprising took place. Although Sun received a telegram from Huang Xing, he was unable to decipher it, and found out about the uprising the next morning in the newspaper. After the successful uprising in Wuchang, the revolutionaries sent telegraphs to other provinces and asked them to follow in their suit, upon which eighteen provinces in Southern and Central China agreed to secede from the Qing government by the end of December 1911.

As part of the resolution of the uprising, the Qing government agreed to a general amnesty for political prisoners. Wang Jingwei was among those released.

In the same month, Sun returned to China to participate in the provisional presidential election and was elected. Representatives from the seceding provinces met on 1 January 1912, and declared the founding of the Republic of China as Sun was sworn in as the first president. The new republic then negotiated with Yuan Shikai to pressure the Qing government to surrender, offering the presidency in the process. On 12 February 1912, Empress Dowager Longyu, on behalf of Puyi, the Xuantong Emperor, announced the abdication of the Qing throne, marking the end of the dynasty.
