= Air Force 3701 =

Official aircraft of the President of the Republic of China

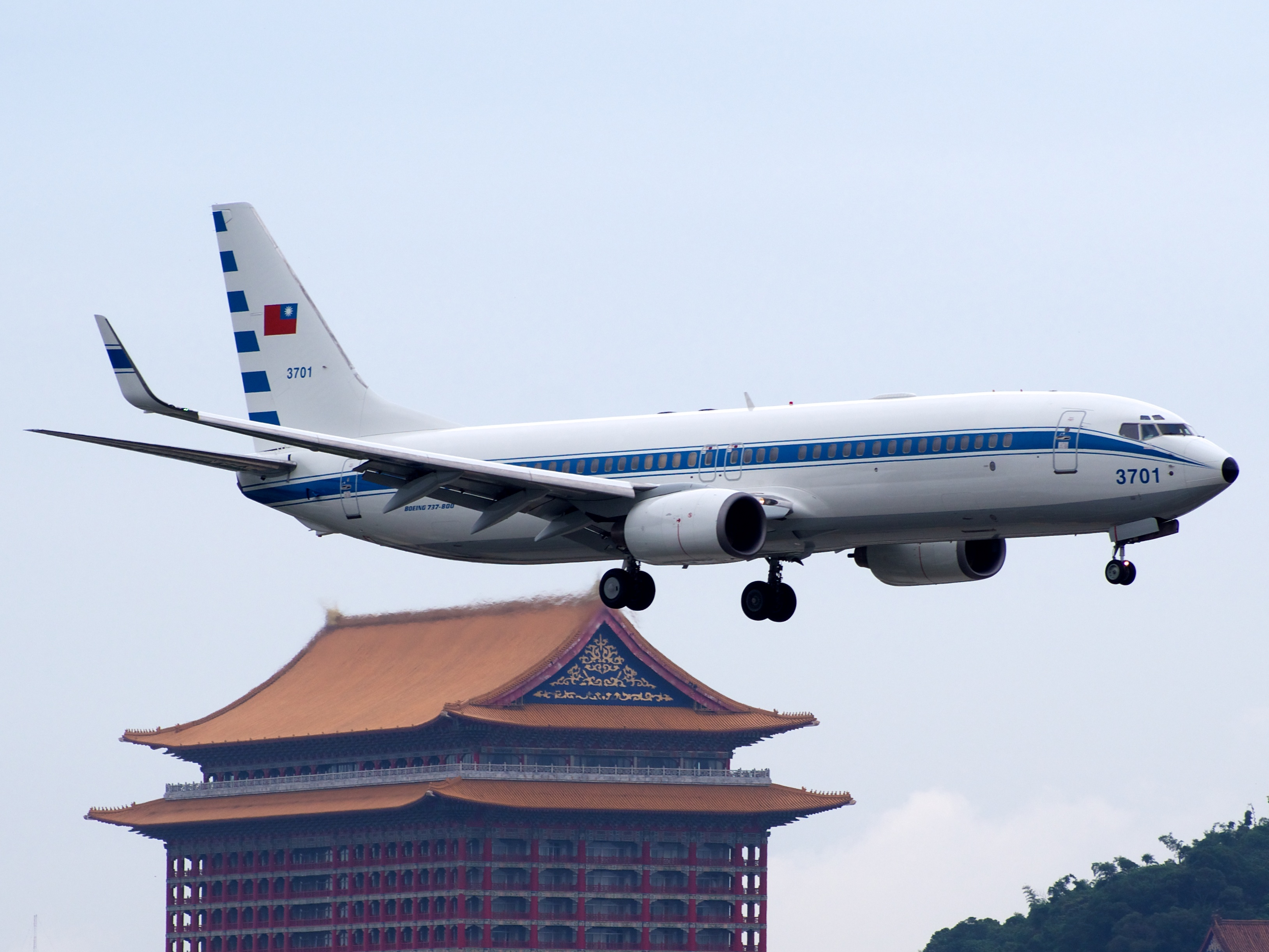

General information
- Type: Presidential transport
- National origin: United States
- Manufacturer: Boeing
- Primary user: Republic of China Air Force
- Number built: 1

History
- Introduction date: 18 March 2000
- First flight: 4 February 2000
- Developed from: Boeing 737-800

The Air Force 3701 (traditional Chinese: 空軍3701; simplified Chinese: 空军3701; pinyin: Kōngjūn 3701) is the presidential aircraft for the President of the Republic of China. The aircraft is a modified Boeing 737-800 and operated by the Republic of China Air Force.

== History ==
- 1998: The Republic of China Air Force places an order with Boeing for a new 737 to replace the previous 727-100 (Air Force 2722) previously used by the President.
- 4 February 2000: The completed aircraft was purchased from Boeing for NT$2 billion by the Ministry of National Defense. It flew from Seattle and arrived three days later.
- 7 February 2000: The aircraft arrived in Taipei.
- 18 March 2000: The cabin crews were formally commissioned and the aircraft registed as Air Force 3701.
- June 2005: The son of President Chen Shui-bian, applied to complete his wedding with the aircraft, which caused controversy. Chen Chih-chung explained that Taiwan High Speed Rail was not yet operational. If people involved in the wedding rushed from Taipei to Taichung, the long distance would impose inconveniences on people along the route, so an application to use Air Force 3701 was submitted.

== Design ==
The aircraft underwent slight modifications in few areas, such as the VIP seating in the front section of its fuselage, however it does not have bedrooms or meeting rooms as other BBJ aircraft might have. It is also equipped with satellite communications systems so the president can remain in contact with staff throughout the flight. Modifications are done to the base aircraft to fit Presidential travel. Air Force 3701 is its registration number, in reference to it being the first 737 purchased by the Air Force. The former Presidential jet was Air Force 2722, the 22nd Boeing 727 registered by the Air Force.

== Limitations ==
Due to Taiwan's complicated diplomatic status with the People's Republic of China (PRC) claims that Taiwan is Chinese territory, many countries have expressed reluctance to allow a ROC-owned, military-operated plane permission to land except for specific diplomatic events, so the limited range of the 737 is adequate for its primarily domestic usage.

International travel is often handled by commercial carriers such as China Airlines, with an Airbus Airbus A350-900 and a Airbus A321, chartered for President Lai's first international trip of the South Pacific in 2024. Additionally, a Dassault Falcon 7X, chartered from Gestair, was used to visit Tuvalu with its short 5,000 ft (1,524m) runway at Funafuti International Airport.

== See also ==
- Air transports of heads of state and government
