= 1911 Chinese provisional presidential election =

1911 Chinese provisional presidential elections
- 29 December 1911
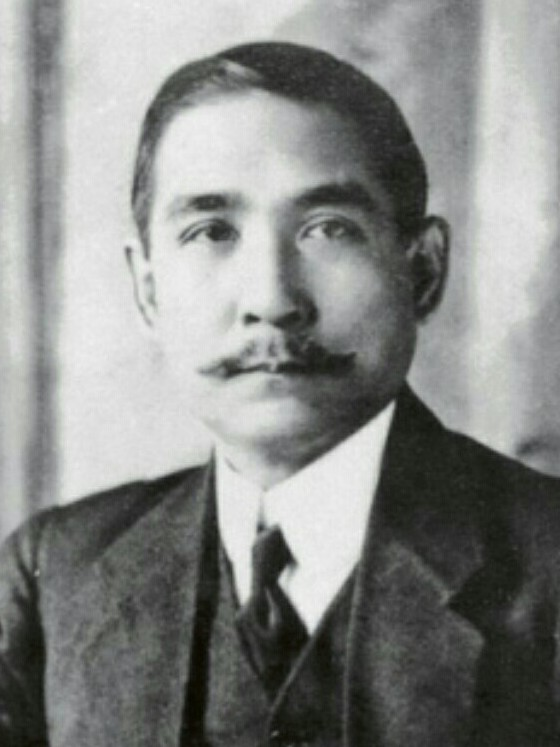

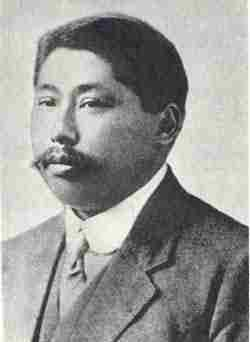

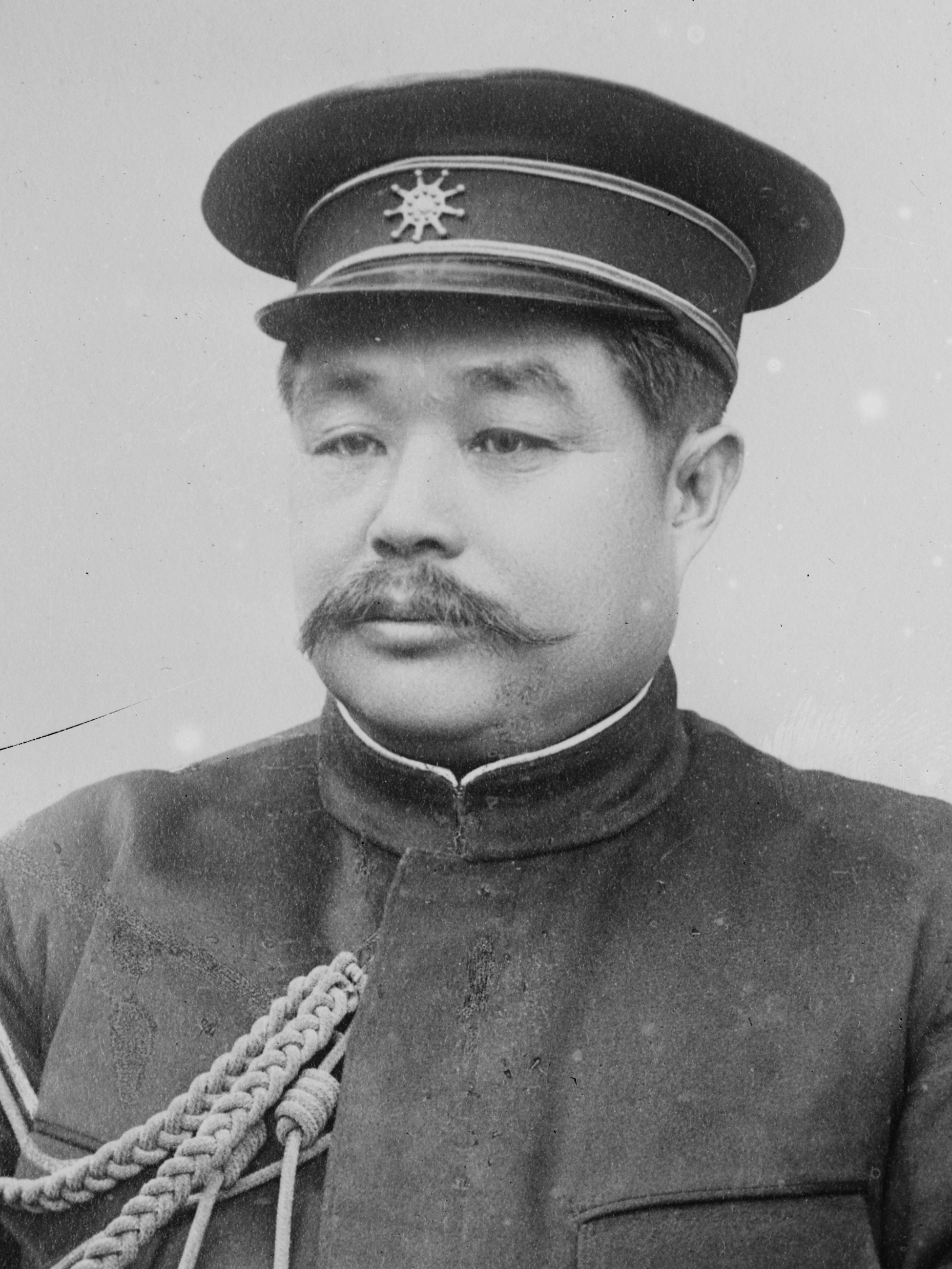
Nominee	Sun Yat-sen	Huang Hsing	Li Yuanhong
Party	Tongmenghui	Tongmenghui	Independent
Electoral vote	16	1	0
Percentage	94.11%	5.88%	0%
Elected President
Sun Yat-sen
Tongmenghui

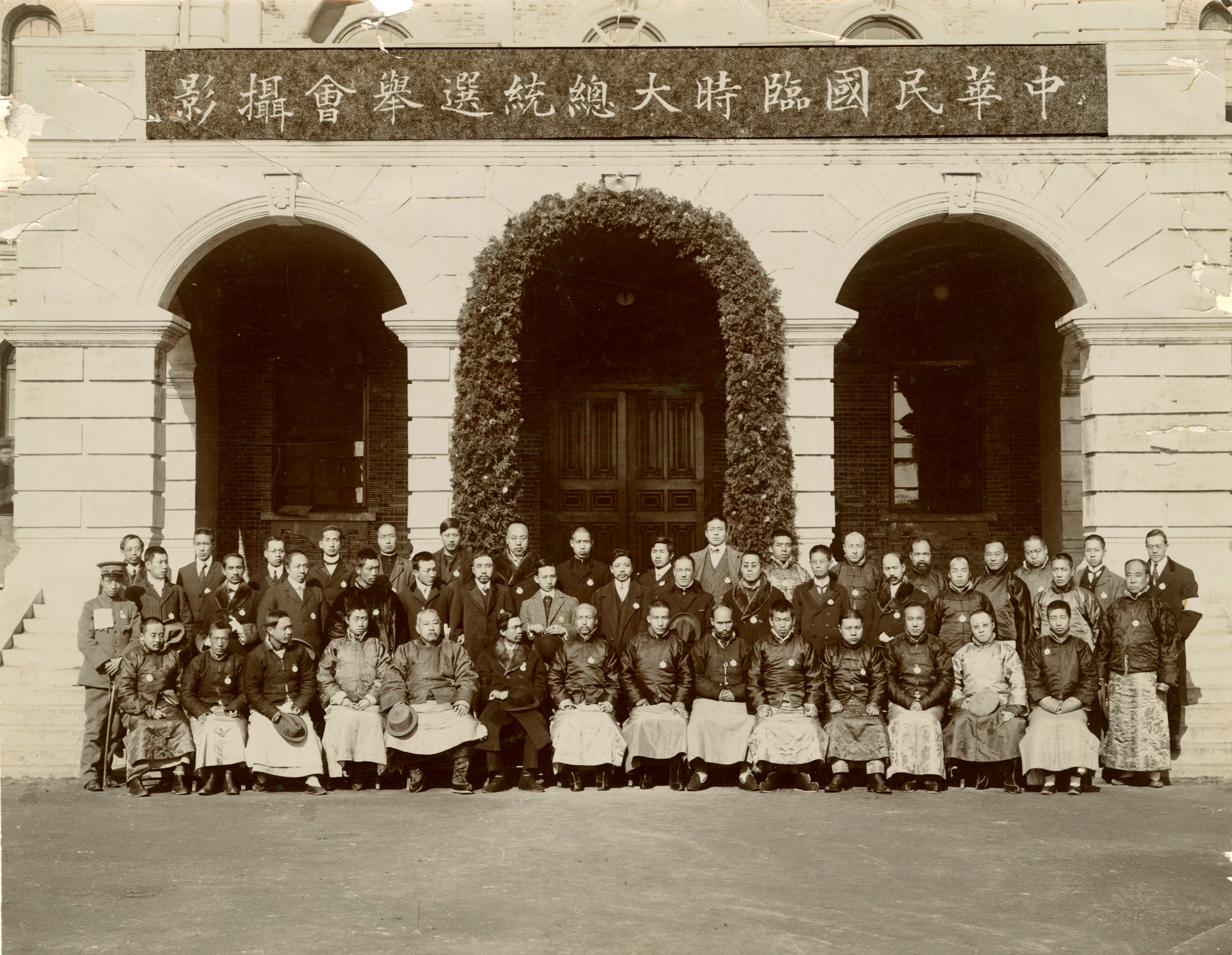
Photograph of the provisional government assembled in Nanjing to elect a leader after the outbreak of the Wuchang Uprising on 10 October 1911

The 1911 Chinese provisional presidential election was the election held on 29 December 1911 during the Xinhai Revolution for the First Provisional President and Vice President of the Provisional Government of the Republic of China. Sun Yat-sen and Li Yuanhong were elected as President and Vice-President respectively. Sun swore in at midnight on 1 January 1912 and declared the official establishment of the Republic of China.

== Electors ==
One vote was given to each of the seventeen provinces presented in the assembly. (Note: Zhili, Zhejiang, Fengtian, Guangdong, Henan, Guangxi, Shandong, Hunan, Shanxi, Hubei, Shaanxi, Fujian, Jiangsu, Sichuan, Anhui, Yunnan, and Jiangxi) Five other provinces were still under Qing control. (Note: Jilin, Xinjiang, Heilongjiang, Guizhou, and Gansu) The protectorates in Outer Mongolia, Inner Mongolia, Qinghai and Tibet were semi-independent and did not participate the election.

== Results ==
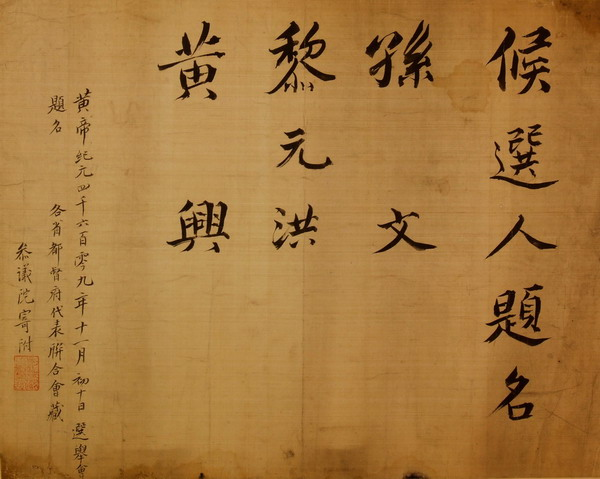
Official list of election candidates

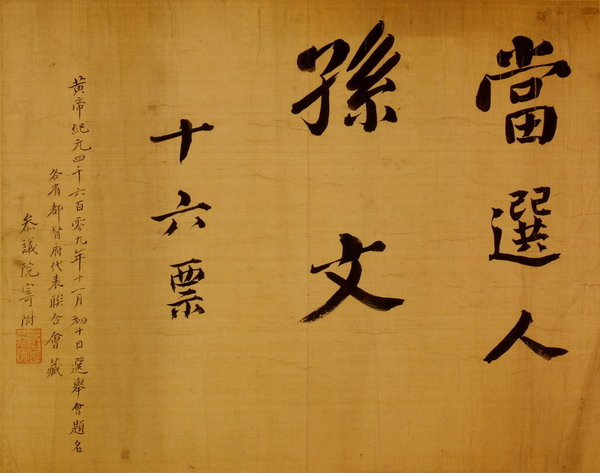
Official results of the election which says "Elected candidate, Sun Wen (Sun Yat-sen), 16 votes"

=== President ===
Candidate	Party	Votes	%
Sun Yat-sen	Tongmenghui	16	94.12
Huang Hsing	Tongmenghui	1	5.88
Li Yuanhong	Independent	0	0.00
Total		17	100.00

=== Vice-President ===
Candidate	Party	Votes	%
Li Yuanhong	Independent	17	100.00
Huang Hsing	Tongmenghui	0	0.00
Total		17	100.00

== See also ==
- History of Republic of China
- President of the Republic of China
- Vice President of the Republic of China
