= 1948 Chinese presidential election =

← 1923	April 20, 1948	1954 →

All 3,045 votes of the National Assembly 1,523 votes needed to win
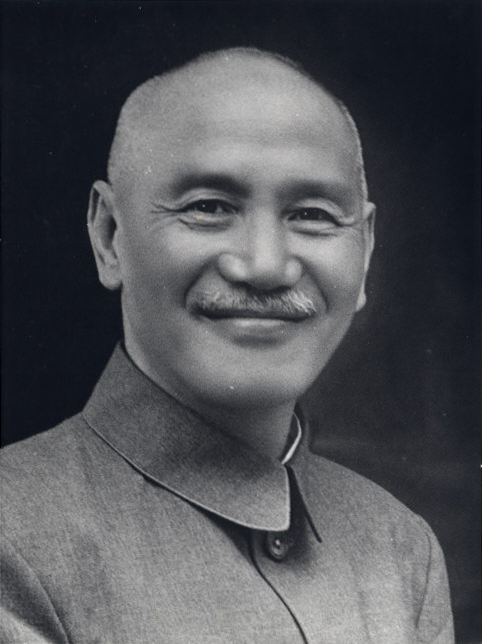

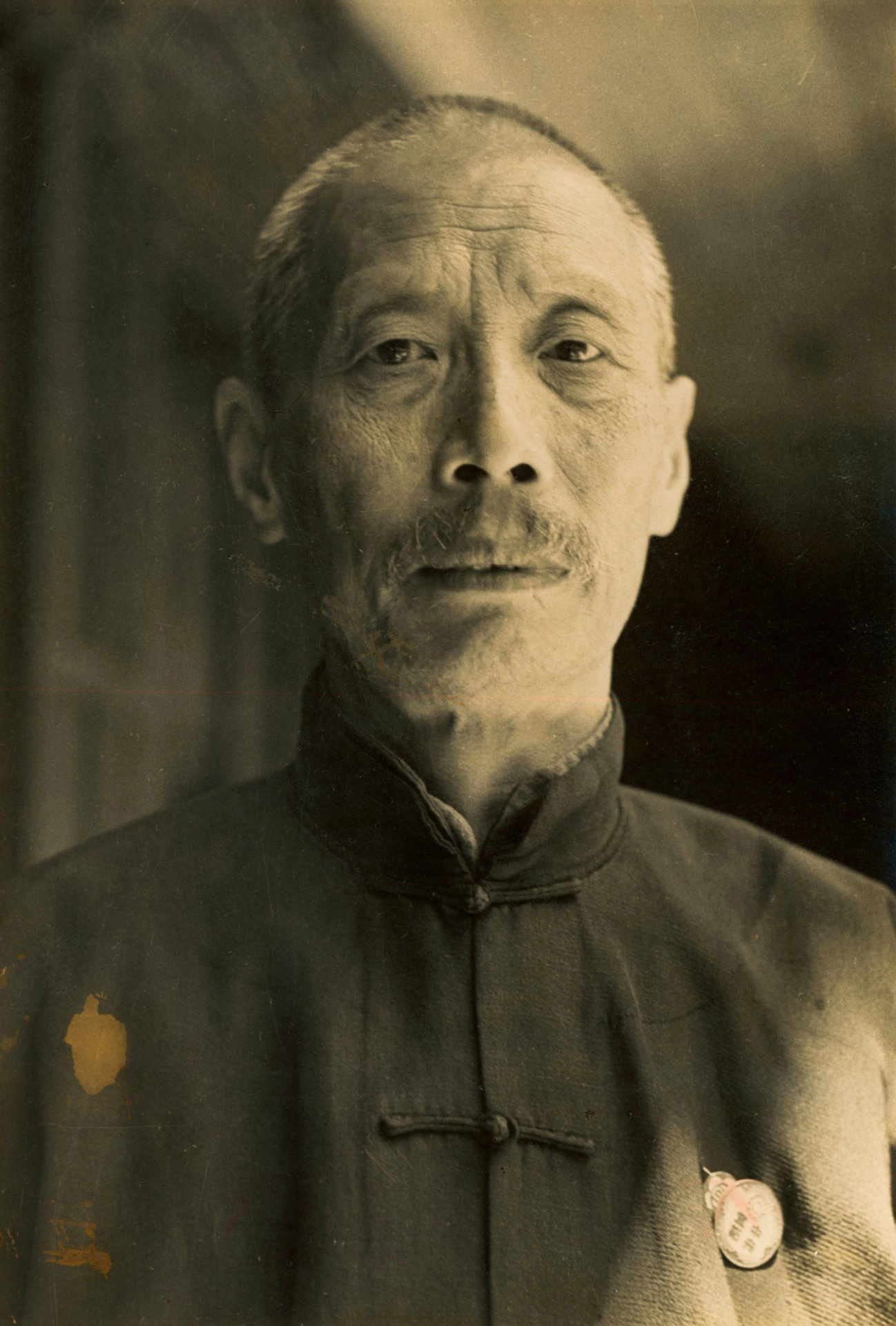
Nominee	Chiang Kai-shek	Ju Zheng
Party	Kuomintang	Kuomintang
Electoral vote	2,430	269
Percentage	90.03%	9.97%
President before election
Chiang Kai-shek
(as Chairman of Nationalist government)
Kuomintang
Elected President
Chiang Kai-shek
Kuomintang

The 1948 Chinese presidential election was held on April 20, 1948, at the National Assembly House in Nanjing. The election was conducted by the National Assembly to elect the president and vice president of China. This was the first election under the newly adopted 1947 Constitution of the Republic of China, and the last prior to the retreat of the government of the Republic of China to Taiwan following their loss in the Civil War the following year.

This indirect election was held during the Chinese Civil War. Chiang Kai-shek, the incumbent leader of the Nationalist government, won a landslide victory against the same party candidate Ju Zheng in the presidential election. However, Sun Fo, Chiang's preferred vice-presidential candidate, was defeated by General Li Zongren in the vice-presidential elections.

Chiang and Li were inaugurated at the Presidential Palace in Nanjing on May 20, 1948. This also marked the transition of Nationalist government to the constitutional government.

== Overview ==
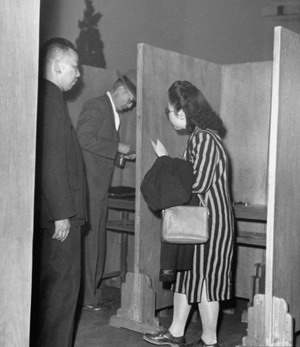
Delegates voting in the election.

After the Northern Expedition, the Kuomintang-led Nationalist government acquired control of a unified China nominally. The party began to draft a constitution to transit the government from tutelage period to constitutional period, according to the political philosophy of Sun Yat-sen.

During the Second Sino-Japanese War, China established a close partnership with the United States and was given military and financial supports. George Marshall was appointed ambassador to Chongqing, the wartime capital, as to broker a negotiation between the Kuomintang (Nationalist Party) and Communist Party after the war. Two parties agreed to rebuild the country with democratization and military nationalization.

Simultaneously, the Nationalist government continued to draft the Constitution of the Republic of China, however it was boycotted by the Communists and the full-scale Chinese Civil War was resumed.

== Electors ==
The election was conducted by the National Assembly in its meeting place National Assembly House in Nanjing. There were 2,961 delegates elected during the 1947 Chinese National Assembly election for the 3,045 seats. In total, there were 2,859 delegates reported to the secretariat to attend this first session of the first National Assembly.

The election regulations had a 50% requirement for the president and vice president to be elected. Since there were 3,045 seats in the National Assembly, the candidates needed to obtain 1,523 votes to be elected. This requirement could be relieved if no candidate passed this threshold in the first three rounds of voting.

== Results ==
=== President ===
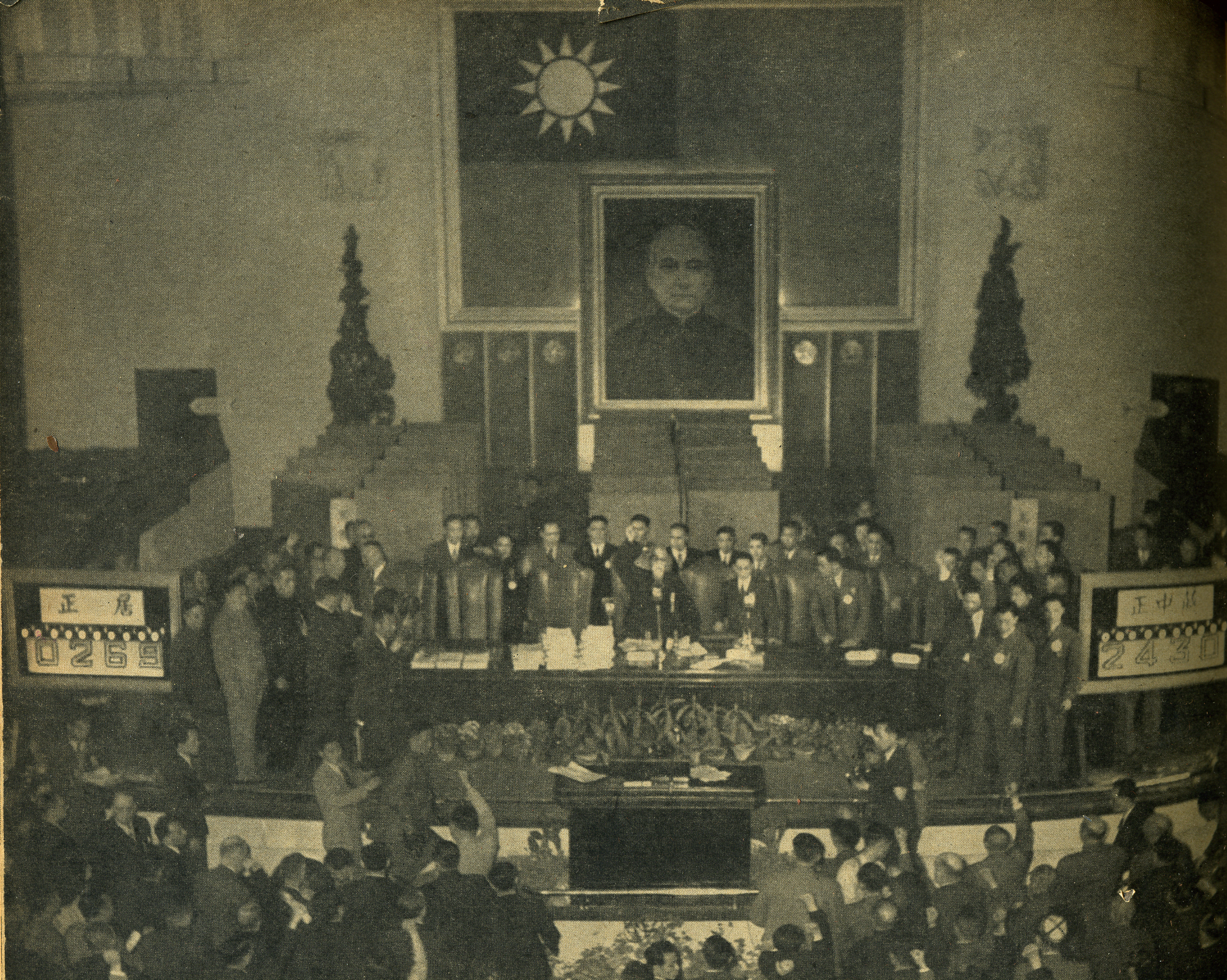
Election results of the presidential election

Candidate	Party	Votes	%
Chiang Kai-shek	Kuomintang	2,430	90.03
Ju Zheng	Kuomintang	269	9.97
Total		2,699	100.00
Valid votes		2,699	98.72
Invalid/blank votes		35	1.28
Total votes		2,734	100.00
Registered voters/turnout		3,045	89.79
Source: Schafferer

=== Vice-President ===
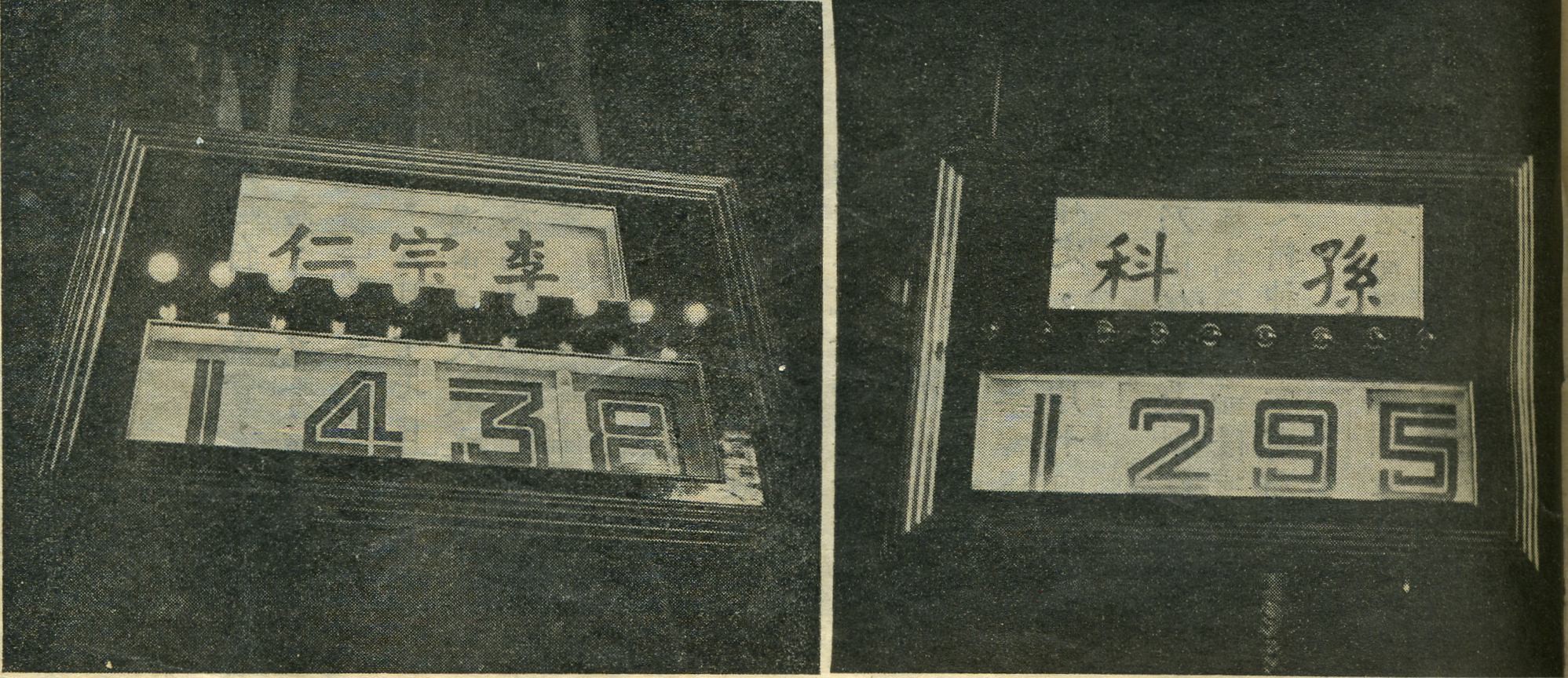
Election results of the 4th round vice-president election

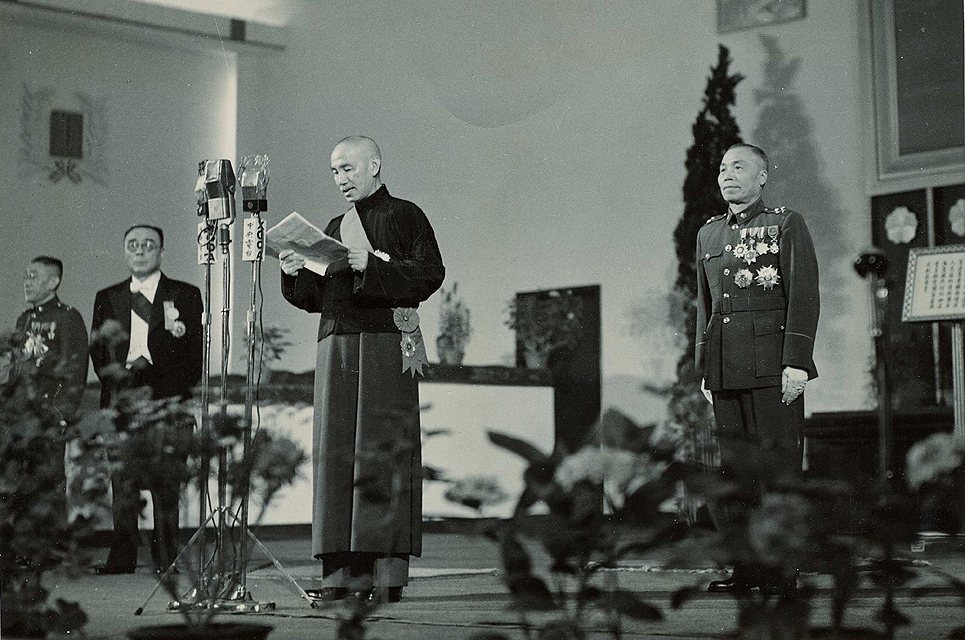
Inaugural address by President Chiang Kai-shek

Party	Candidate	First round		Second round		Third round		Fourth round	
Party	Candidate	Votes	%	Votes	%	Votes	%	Votes	%
Li Zongren	Kuomintang	754	27.30	1,163	42.69	1,156	42.64	1,438	52.62
Sun Fo	Kuomintang	559	20.24	945	34.69	1,040	38.36	1,295	47.38
Cheng Qian	Kuomintang	522	18.90	616	22.61	515	19.00		
Yu Youren	Kuomintang	493	17.85						
Mo Teh-hui	Independent	218	7.89						
Xu Fulin	China Democratic Socialist Party	216	7.82						
Total		2,762	100.00	2,724	100.00	2,711	100.00	2,733	100.00

Vice President Candidates

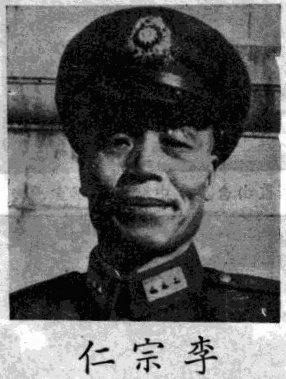
Li Zongren

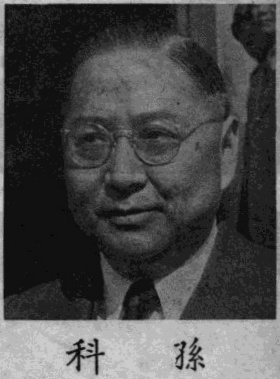
Sun Fo

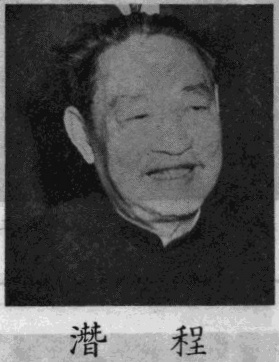
Cheng Qian

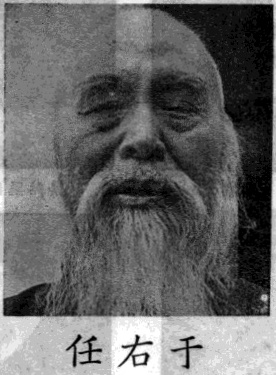
Yu Youren

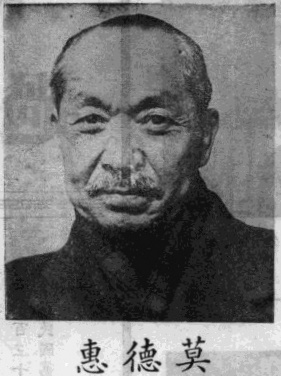
Mo Teh-hui

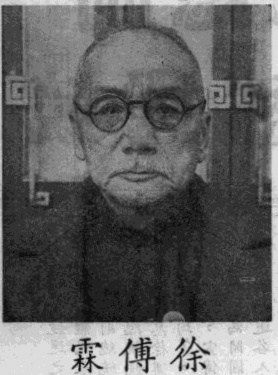
Xu Fulin

== Previous and next elections ==
There were some regime changes in China during the first half of the 20th century. Depending on the definition, possible previous and next elections for the leader of China are listed below.

Order	Election	Political entity	Title (term)	Electoral college
Previous	1923 Chinese presidential election	Republic of China (1912–1949)	President the Republic of China (3rd)	National Assembly (1st, Beiyang government)
Previous	1943 Chinese chairmanship election	Republic of China (1912–1949)	Chairman of the Nationalist government (4th)	Central Committee of Kuomintang
Next	1949 Chinese chairmanship election	People's Republic of China	Chairman of the Central People's Government	Chinese People's Political Consultative Conference
Next	1954 Chinese presidential election	Republic of China (on Taiwan)	President the Republic of China (2nd)	National Assembly (1st, Constitutional government)

== See also ==
- History of Republic of China
- Nationalist government
- President of the Republic of China
- Vice President of the Republic of China
