= Zhang Wohua =

Chinese politician

- 張我華
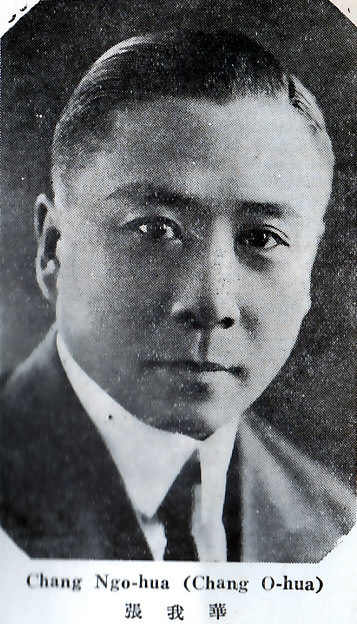
- Zhang, as pictured in Who's Who in China 4th ed

Acting Minister of the Interior
- In office December 1930
- Preceded by: Liu Shangqing
- Succeeded by: Li Wenfan

Member of the National Assembly
- In office 1913–1925

Personal details
- Born: 1886 Fengyang County, Anhui, China
- Died: 26 November 1938 (aged 51–52)
- Party: Kuomintang

Zhang Wohua (Chinese: 張我華; 1886 – 26 November 1938) was a Chinese politician.

== Career ==
Zhang was a native of Fengyang County. He studied law at Meiji University in Japan, where he joined the Tongmenghui. Upon completing his education, Zhang taught law in Jilin and worked for the Shenzhou Daily, a Shanghai newspaper.

Zhang was elected to the first National Assembly in 1913, but was exiled to Shanghai soon after the Second Revolution. He was active in the Constitutional Protection Junta and participated in the Constitutional Protection Movement. Zhang remained a high-ranking assemblyman until 1925, when he was named director of the National Tobacco and Alcohol Affairs Department.

Zhang helped consolidate the Nationalist government in 1928, working for the Ministry of Foreign Affairs. He was appointed deputy foreign minister in October 1929. From April 1930, Zhang served dual appointments in the foreign and interior ministries. In December 1930, Zhang became acting interior minister. He retired from politics in 1932, and moved to Xuancheng.

Soon after the Second Sino-Japanese War broke out, Zhang organized a resistance movement against the Japanese. He was killed by a Japanese airstrike on 26 November 1938, aged 53.
