= Li Wenfan =

Chinese revolutionary and politician

- 李文範
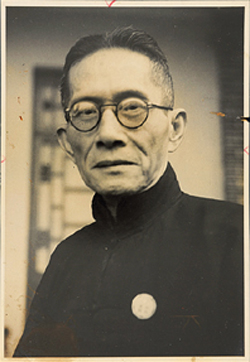

Vice President of the Judicial Yuan
- In office April 1947 – July 1948
- President: Ju Zheng
- Preceded by: Qin Zhen
- Succeeded by: Shi Zhiquan

Minister of the Interior
- In office 30 December 1931 – 8 February 1932
- Preceded by: Zhang Wohua (acting); Liu Shangqing
- Succeeded by: Wang Jingwei (acting); Peng Xuepei

Secretary-General of the Legislative Yuan
- In office 13 November 1928 – 20 June 1931
- Preceded by: Office established
- Succeeded by: Li Xiaosheng (acting); Wu Jinghong

Personal details
- Born: 20 October 1884 Nanhai, Guangdong, China
- Died: 23 June 1953 (aged 68) Taipei, Taiwan
- Party: Kuomintang
Li Wenfan
- Traditional Chinese: 李文範
- Simplified Chinese: 李文范
Transcriptions
Standard Mandarin
- Hanyu Pinyin: Lǐ Wénfàn
- Bopomofo: ㄌㄧˇ ㄨㄣˊㄈㄢˋ
- Wade–Giles: Li^{3} Wên^{2}-fan^{4}
Yue: Cantonese
- Jyutping: Lei^{5} Man^{4}-faan^{6}
Southern Min
- Hokkien POJ: Lí Bûn-hoān
Courtesy name
- Chinese: 君佩
Transcriptions
Standard Mandarin
- Hanyu Pinyin: Jūn Pèi
- Bopomofo: ㄐㄩㄣ ㄆㄟˋ
- Wade–Giles: Chün^{1} P'ei^{4}
Yue: Cantonese
- Jyutping: Gwan^{1} Pui^{3}
Southern Min
- Hokkien POJ: Kun Pē

Li Wenfan (Chinese: 李文範; 20 October 1884 – 23 June 1953) was a Chinese revolutionary and politician.

== Career ==
Born in present-day Nanhai District, Li was also known by the courtesy name Junpei (君佩). He enrolled at Hosei University in Tokyo in 1900, and joined the Tongmenghui upon its establishment in 1905. Upon returning to China, he taught at Guangdong Law School and led the Guangdong branch of the Tongmenghui. Li also participated in the Second Guangzhou Uprising.

In 1912, Li became Secretary-General of the Guangdong Provincial Department of Military Affairs. Li actively opposed Yuan Shikai's empire, fighting in the Second Revolution and the National Protection War. In 1920, Li moved to France, where he pursued further academic study.

By September 1924, Li had been named director of the Guangdong Provincial Department of Governmental Affairs under governor Hu Hanmin. The Nationalist government was established in July 1925 with Li as secretary-general. Within the Kuomintang, he served as secretary-general of the central and political committees. Li traveled to the United States in November 1926 to audit several Kuomintang chapters based there.

He returned in March 1927, and was appointed to the Kuomintang's propaganda committee. In June 1928, Li returned to the Guangdong Provincial Government as director of civil affairs. In October 1928, he was named the first secretary-general of the Legislative Yuan. Liu later served on the third through sixth convocations of the Kuomintang central executive committee, as well as the fifth standing committee. Appointed interior minister in December 1931, Liu left office in February 1932.

After the Second Sino-Japanese War broke out, Li organized a defense committee. In November 1940, he was named chairman of the political works committee and served on several other party committees. Li was elected to the National Constituent Assembly in November 1946, and served as vice president of the Judicial Yuan from April 1947 to July 1948. Later that year, Li was elected to the first National Assembly to be convened after the ratification of the Constitution of the Republic of China.

Li retreated to Taiwan after Kuomintang forces lost the Second Chinese Civil War in 1949. He continued serving on the National Assembly, and was an active member of the Kuomintang central committee, as well as an adviser to President Chiang Kai-shek.

He died in Taipei at the age of 68 on 23 June 1953.
