= Eternal Parliament =

1948–1991 Republic of China congress

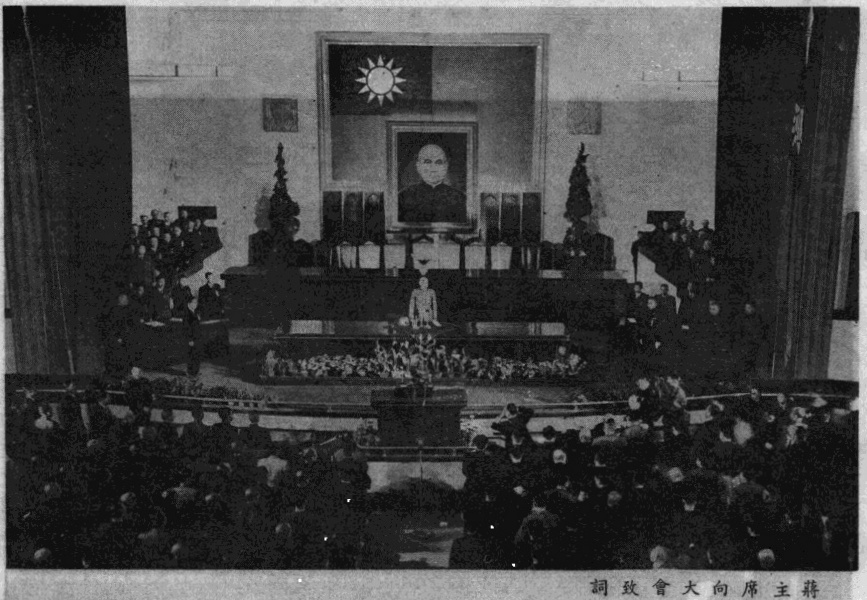
Chiang Kai-shek addressing the National Assembly in National Great Hall, Nanking in 1948

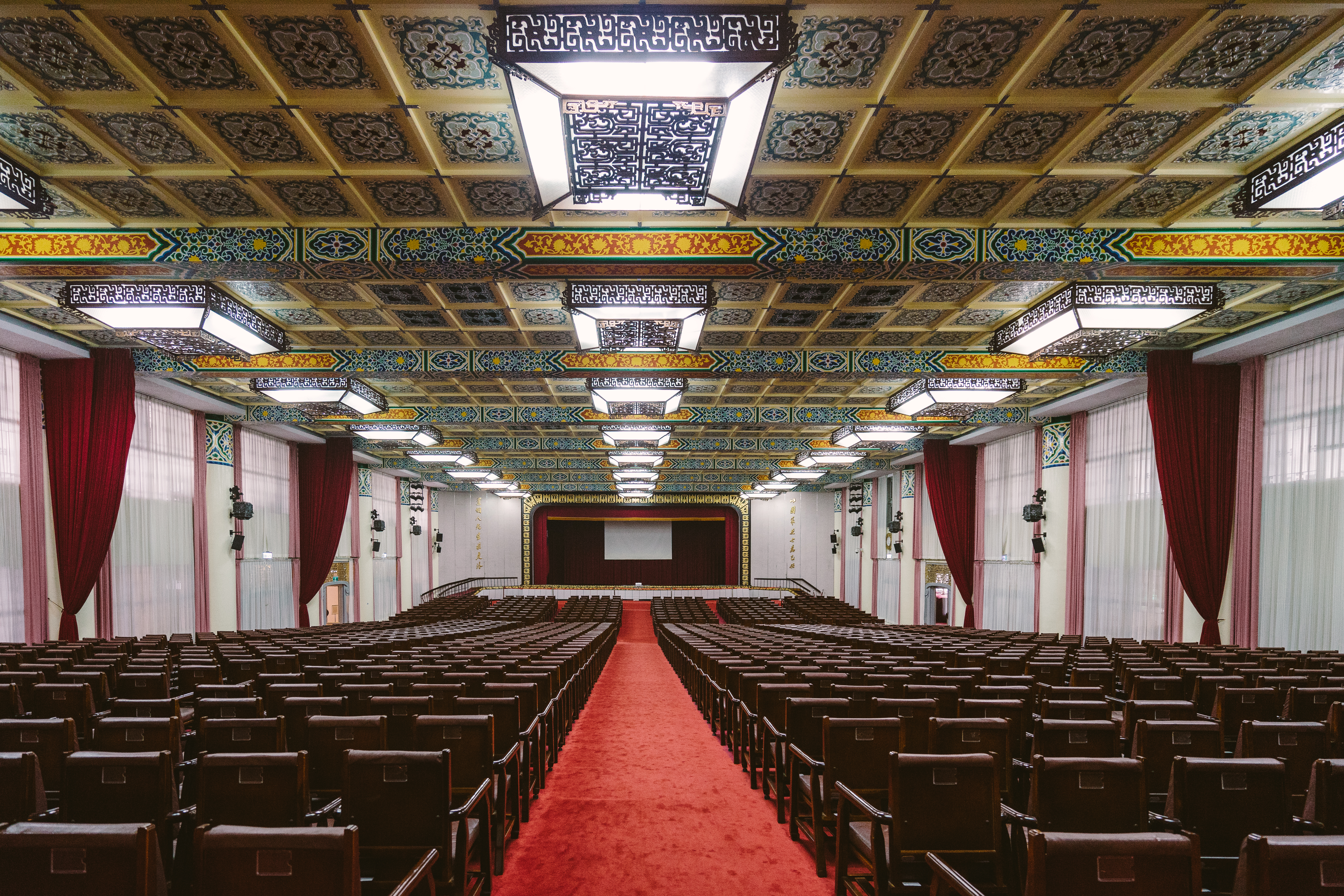
Chamber of National Assembly in Chung-Shan Building, Taipei until 2005

The "Eternal Parliament" (Chinese: 萬年國會, lit. 'Ten-thousand-year Congress') (Note: Ten thousand years in Sinosphere means myriad years. Unlike the cheer "wansui", the term here does not express triumph.) refers to the first congress of the Republic of China (in mainland China, then in Taiwan), whose members served continuously for 43 years from 1948 until 1991 under the one-party rule of the Chinese Nationalist Party (Kuomintang), largely corresponding to the period of martial law in Taiwan. The congress was composed of the National Assembly, Legislative Yuan, and Control Yuan. Members of the congress were officially named as Senior Congressperson (資深中央民代 or 資深民代), but derogatorily referred to as "Ten-thousand-year delegates" and "Old Thieves" (老賊). (Note: The quote is from Chapter 47 of Book XIV (Hsien Wan) of Confucian Analects – via Wikisource.: "In youth not humble as befits a junior; in manhood, doing nothing worthy of being handed down; and living on to old age:—this is to be a pest." (幼而不孫弟、長而無述焉、老而不死、是爲賊。) "Pest" in this translation corresponds to "thieve".)

The assembly commenced after the first elections in 1947 and 1948 mandated by the newly enacted Constitution of the Republic of China, with the inaugural meeting held in 1948 Nanking. While their terms were ostensibly limited to three or six years, they were extended indefinitely after the Kuomintang was defeated in the Chinese civil war in December 1949, forcing the government and the legislature to retreat to Taiwan. The congress only came to a close on 31 December 1991 amidst democratization on the island.

== History ==
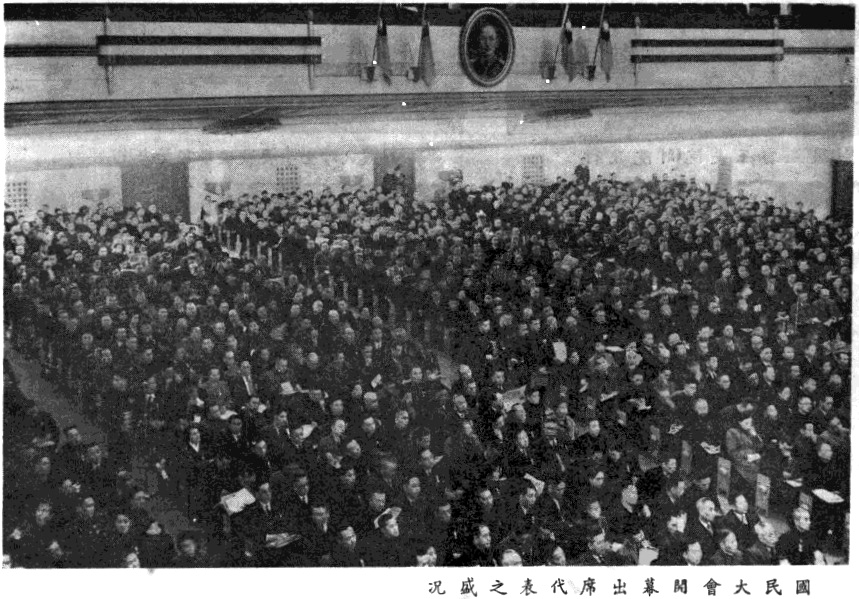
First session of the National Assembly in 1948

Mainland China was governed by the Nationalist government, a one-party state led by the Kuomintang. With the Constitution of the Republic of China promulgated in 1947, the government started the preparation for organizing elections of the National Assembly and the lower house Legislative Yuan, both directly elected, and of the upper house Control Yuan elected by the provincial assemblies. 2,961 delegates of the National Assembly and 759 members of the Legislative Yuan were elected in November 1947 and January 1948 respectively. 180 Control Yuan members were elected by that January as well.

With the polls completed, new members from the three assemblies gathered between March and June 1948 in Nanking. National Assembly voted to elect the first constitutional president and vice-president, followed by the approval passed by the two houses. The constitutional government of the Republic of China is thus formally established, with Chiang Kai-shek, who chaired the Nationalist government since 1943, continuing his leadership over the state.

However, after one and a half year, the government was defeated by the communists in the civil war and was forced to retreat to Taiwan. The majority in the congress, including representatives of mainland constituencies, followed the officials and settled in Taiwan.

== Indefinite extension ==
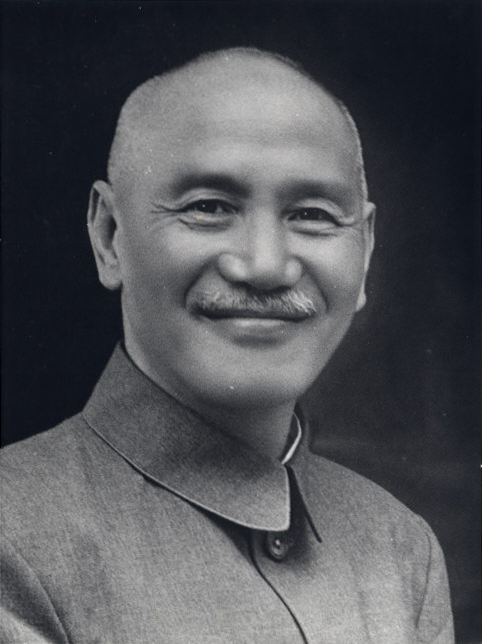
Chiang Kai-shek

The Kuomintang has insisted on the legitimacy (Chinese: 法統) to rule over mainland China despite losing the civil war, and believed a second term of congress would not begin unless retaking the communist occupation zone and hold nationwide polls. In 1950, President Chiang extended the tenure of Legislative Yuan members for a year upon the recommendations from the Executive Yuan, which was then repeated twice. As the end of six-year term of both the National Assembly and the Control Yuan, along with the prolonged Legislative Yuan term, loomed in 1953, the Executive Yuan suggested extending the term institutionally. Chiang thus wrote to the secretariat of the National Assembly. By citing Article 28 of the constitution that "… [t]he term of office of the delegates to each National Assembly shall terminate on the day on which the next National Assembly convenes…", he affirmed that the current term of office has not terminated.

As for the two chambers of the legislature, the Constitutional Court ruled in 1954 that the members of both Yuans shall continue exercising their powers until election could be held across the country which covered the communist-held mainland.

… our state has been undergoing a severe calamity, which makes re-election of the second term of both Yuans de facto impossible. It would contradict the purpose of the Five-Yuan system as established by the Constitution, if both the Legislative and Control Yuans ceased to exercise their respective powers. Therefore, before the second-term Members are elected, convene and are convoked in accordance with the laws, all of the first-term Members of both the Legislative and Control Yuans shall continue to exercise their respective powers.

— No. 31 Interpretation of Judicial Yuan (司法院釋字第31號解釋)

Twenty years after the retreat, Chiang ordered 1969 elections for supplementary legislators (增選代表; 'Newly-elected representatives') that will represent the "free area" of Taiwan in light of the vacancies caused by deaths or other reasons. The elected members would serve until a new term begins, the same as the incumbents. Three years later, a new election law decided to increase the number of supplementary members. But unlike the previous members, those elected thereafter (增額代表; 'New-quota representatives') would only be in office for three years or six years as bounded by the constitution, with regular elections to be held for these seats.

Despite the expansion of the legislatures with fresh blood, delegates first elected in 1947 and 1948 remained in office and represented the now occupied areas. To distinguish from the new colleagues elected after 1972, they were officially named "Senior Congressperson".

	Senior Congressperson (Note: According to Act Governing the Voluntary Retirement of the First-Term Senior Congressperson, "Senior Congressperson" includes those elected in 1969 who held office until the second session of the congress begins, and the substituted members that succeeded the 1947/8 members.)				Supplementary members
	1947–8 elected	1948 Nanking meeting	1950s Taipei meeting	1989 incumbents	1989 incumbents (Note: Elected in 1986 (National Assembly delegates), 1987 (Control Yuan members), and 1989 (Legislative Yuan legislators))
National Assembly	2,961	2,878	1,578	794	84
Legislative Yuan	759	754	557	133	130
Control Yuan	180	178	104	31	32

== Criticism ==
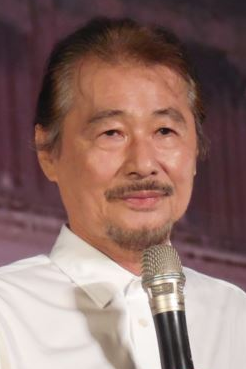
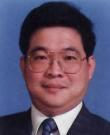
Shih (left) and Ju (right) slammed the congressman for being "eternal" and "old thieves"

The scenes of aging delegates carrying urine bags or on drips, transmitted by the television networks, were considered to have serious negative implications and damaged the reputation of Taiwan.^{:195} Calls for legislature reforms to retire the Senior Congressmen grew as they were deemed to be too old and too inefficient.

A year after his release from prison for the alleged plot to overthrow the Kuomintang regime, Shih Ming-teh, who would become Chairman of the Democratic Progressive Party in the 1990s, wrote in the opposition magazine This Generation (這一代) in 1978 and advocated establishing the fourth legislative organ. The term "Ten-thousand-year Congress" coined by Shih in the article soon became the catchphrase of the opposition Tangwai movement to slam the government for not reforming the body. Opposition lawmaker Ju Gau-jeng quoted the Analects of Confucius and branded the decades-old delegates "Old Thieves".

Frank Hsieh, later Premier, was elected to the Legislative Yuan in late 1989. Hsieh said some older colleagues apparently had dementia, after they seemed to have forgotten meeting him despite having seen each other just ten minutes ago. He added that senior congressman voiced support to the Executive Yuan during a vote on Legislative Yuan's standing order. Hsieh also found that while half of the 144 seniors he met were able to calculate "3+7", only around 25% to 30% could answer "37+8" correctly, and 16 legislators for "37+88".^{:274}

Opposition activists once described the ridicule of the Taiwan legislature with comparison to the British parliament.^{:6}

Apart from the impossible task of turning a female into a male, British parliament can do anything. As for the Chinese Legislative Yuan, it can do nothing except turning children into elderlies and hair in black into beard in white.

== Reform ==
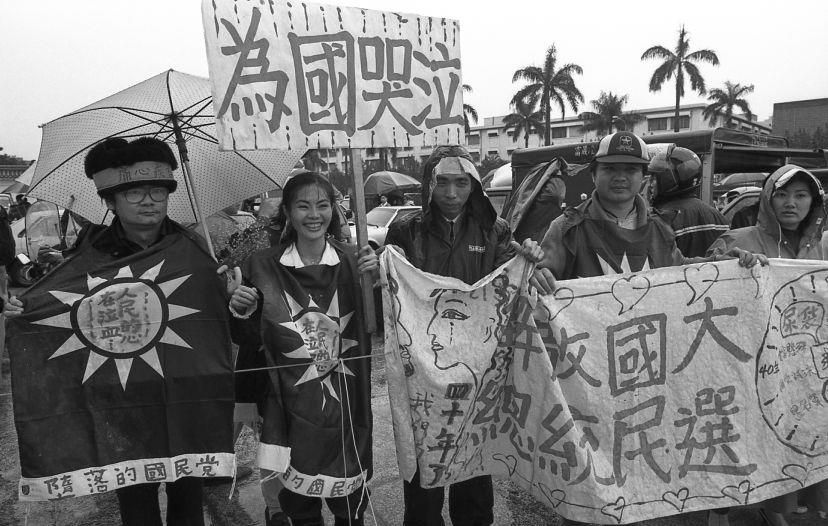
A banner at Wild Lily student movement reads: "Dissolves National Assembly; Popular Vote for Presidency"

Protests demanding a fundamental parliamentary reform grew in the late 1980s, even within the younger rank of Kuomintang. In 1988, vice president Lee Teng-hui became the new president and Kuomintang leader upon the death of Chiang Kai-shek's son Chiang Ching-kuo. In January 1989, Legislative Yuan passed the Act Governing the Voluntary Retirement of the First-Term Senior Congressperson, forcing a "voluntary retirement" for those unable to perform duties for one year or more due to serious illness and resided abroad for more than half a year. Members from the three legislative bodies may also apply for voluntary retirement with pension. Unmoved by the new law, most of the Senior Congressmen remained in office, infuriating the opposition who began Wild Lily student movement in March 1990.

On 2 March, Lee was re-elected as president by a National Assembly vote. He met the protestors hours after the election and voiced support to their demands. On 21 June, the Constitutional Court decided all Senior Congressmen shall leave office before 31 December 1991 "in compliance with the spirit of the Constitution".

… In fact, since 1969, the Central Government has been holding regular elections of congressional members in the Free Territory, in order to solidify the congressional bodies gradually. To address the present situation, those members of the First Congress who have not been re-elected shall cease exercising their powers no later than December 31, 1991. Those who have been proven to be incapable of exercising or to have often failed to exercise their powers as revealed by investigations shall be immediately discharged from their offices. The Central Government shall schedule, in due course, a nationwide election of the next members of Congress in compliance with the spirit of the Constitution, the essence of this Interpretation, and all relevant regulations, so that the constitutional system may function properly.

— No.261 Interpretation of Judicial Yuan (司法院釋字第261號解釋)

A bipartisan National Affairs Conference (國是會議) a week after the court decision was joined by Kuomintang and opposition camp, including the flagship Democratic Progressive Party, to search for consensuses over amending the constitution and the full reform of the congress.

== Retirement and dissolution ==
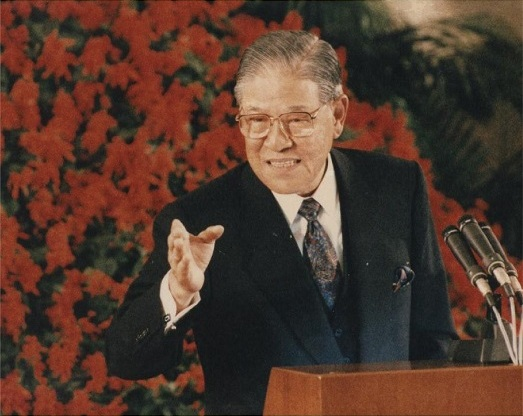
President Lee Teng-hui announcing the end of "National Mobilization for Suppression of the Communist Rebellion" period

National Assembly repealed Temporary Provisions against the Communist Rebellion and adopted Additional Articles of the Constitution in 1991, providing legality for parliamentary reform and full popular elections in the de facto ruling territory. The resolutions were subsequently signed by Lee Teng-hui and came into effect. The second National Assembly was elected on 21 December 1991. Ten days later, all Senior Congressmen from the tricameral bodies officially retired, including 565 National Assembly delegates who had been in office for 43 years 9 months.

Starting from January 1992, the second National Assembly was composed of delegates elected in 1986 and 1991, until early 1993 when the tenure of the earlier members ended and only members elected in 1991 remained. The National Assembly also approved members of the Control Yuan appointed by the president, which no longer functions as an elected chamber as a result of the new constitutional articles.

Legislative Yuan's election was held in December 1992 to succeed legislators assumed office three years ago. Both Yuans began their new terms on 1 February 1993.

		1991						1992				1993				
		…	Aug	Sep	Oct	Nov	Dec	Jan	…	…	Dec	Jan	Feb	Mar	Apr	…
National Assembly	Term	1st National Assembly						2nd National Assembly								
National Assembly	Members	Elected in 1947, 1969, 1986						Elected in 1986, 1991					Elected in 1991			
Legislative Yuan	Term	1st Legislative Yuan											2nd Legislative Yuan			
Legislative Yuan	Members	Elected in 1948, 1969, 1989						Elected in 1989					Elected in 1992			
Control Yuan	Term	1st Control Yuan											2nd Control Yuan			
Control Yuan	Members	Elected in 1947–8, 1969, 1987						Elected in 1987					Appointed in 1992			

National Assembly was formally disbanded in 2000, but was briefly revived in 2005 to ratify new constitutional changes. Taiwan has since been considered a unicameral state.

The last of the Senior Congressmen from both the Control Yuan and Legislative Yuan died in 2006 and 2021 respectively. Hung Wen-shan (Chinese: 洪文山), a member of the National Assembly, was the last surviving Senior Congressman, having died on 30 May 2025 at 108 years old.

== See also ==
- Cavalier Parliament, the English parliament that sat for nearly 18 years
- Senator for life
