= Xu Fulin =

Chinese politician

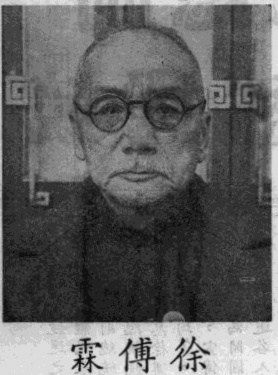

Personal details
- Born: 1879; Heping, Guangdong
- Died: 12 January 1958 (aged 78–79)
- Political party: Chinese National Socialist Party
- Occupation: Legal scholar; Politician

Xu Fulin, Hsu Fu-lin (Chinese: 徐傅霖; Wade–Giles: Hsü² Fu⁴-lin²; 1879 – 12 January 1958) was a politician and legal scholar of the Republic of China.

Born in Heping, Guangdong, Xu was educated in Japan and joined the Tongmenghui. In 1909, he became member of the Guangdong Consultative Bureau. He was the provisional Senator in Peking after the establishment of the Republic of China and became member of the first House of Representative. In 1914, after the parliament was dissolved, he joined the Chinese Revolutionary Party.

In 1929, he co-founded the Chinese National Socialist Party which merged into the China Democratic Socialist Party. He ran for the Republic of China vice-presidential election of 1948 and Republic of China presidential election of 1954 but failed. In January 1955, he was elected chairman of the Chinese Democratic Socialist Party. He died on 12 January 1958.
