= Chen Chin-jang =

Taiwanese politician

- 陳金讓
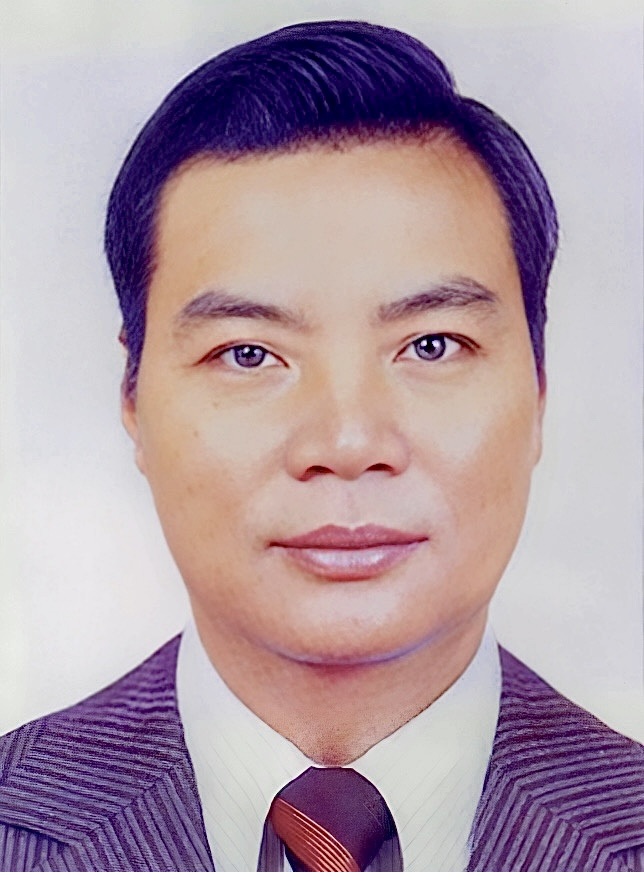
- Official portrait, 1999

Acting Speaker of the National Assembly
- In office 8 September 1999 – 19 May 2000
- Preceded by: Su Nan-cheng
- Succeeded by: Office disestablished

Member of the National Assembly
- In office 31 May 2005 – 7 June 2005
- In office 20 May 1992 – 20 May 2000
- Constituency: Party-list

8th Secretary-General of the National Assembly
- In office 31 January 1992 – September 1996 (Note: as acting until 26 March 1992)
- Speaker: Frederick Chien
- Preceded by: Chu Shih-lieh
- Succeeded by: Chen Chuan

10th Minister of Examination
- In office 4 September 1996 – 20 January 1999
- President: Hsu Shui-teh
- Preceded by: Wang Tso-jung
- Succeeded by: Wu Wan-lan

Personal details
- Born: 1 February 1935 (age 90); Taiwan
- Political party: Kuomintang
- Education: Soochow University (LLB)

Chen Chin-jang (Chinese: 陳金讓; pinyin: Chén Jīnràng; born 1 February 1935) is a Taiwanese politician. He sat on the National Assembly from 1992 to 2005, and served as Minister of Examination between 1996 and 1999.

== Early life and education ==
Chen was born in Taiwan on 1 February 1935. He graduated from Soochow University in Taipei with a Bachelor of Laws (LL.B.) in 1958.

== Political career ==
Soon after his 1991 election to the National Assembly, Chen was named secretary general of the legislative body. He served in the role until September 1996, when he became minister of examination. Chen retained his seat in the parliament in the 1996 election, and was the body's acting speaker between 1999 and 2000. In this position, he oversaw the vote that transferred many of the Assembly's powers to the Legislative Yuan. When elections for the National Assembly were next held in 2005, all seats were elected via proportional representation, and Chen was ranked first on the Kuomintang party list. Chen was subsequently elected to the fourth presidium of the National Assembly. In June 2000, Chen was elected to the Kuomintang's Central Standing Committee.

Chen supported Lien Chan's presidential campaign in 2000, and backed Ma Ying-jeou in 2012.
