= National Assembly (Republic of China) =

1947–2005 electoral college and constitutional convention in the East Asian country

National Assembly 國民大會 Guómín Dàhuì (Mandarin Pinyin) Kuo²-min² Ta⁴-hui⁴ (Wade-Giles) Kok-bîn Tāi-hōe (Taiwanese) Koet-mìn Thai-fi (Hakka)

Type
- Type: Constitutional convention Presidential electoral college

History
- Founded: 29 March 1948; 78 years ago
- Disbanded: In mainland China: 1 October 1949; 77 years ago (Proclamation of the PRC, de facto); In Taiwan: 7 June 2005; 21 years ago (Constitution amended, subject to a Sunset clause)
- Preceded by: National Assembly (Beiyang government)
- Succeeded by: In mainland China: Chinese People's Political Consultative Conference and later National People's Congress; In Taiwan: Direct presidential elections, constitutional referendums, Legislative Yuan, and Constitutional Court of Judicial Yuan
- Seats: 3,045 (1947); 300 (2005)

Elections
- Voting system: Single non-transferable vote (1947–2000); Party-list proportional representation (2005)
- First general election: 21 November 1947; 78 years ago
- Last general election: 14 May 2005; 21 years ago

Meeting place
- National Great Hall, Nanjing (1948); Zhongshan Hall, Taipei (1954–1966); Chung-Shan Building, Taipei (1972–2005)

Constitution
- Additional Articles and the original Constitution of the Republic of China

National Assembly
- Traditional Chinese: 國民大會
- Simplified Chinese: 国民大会
- Literal meaning: Assembly of the Nationals
Transcriptions
Standard Mandarin
- Hanyu Pinyin: Guómín Dàhuì
- Bopomofo: ㄍㄨㄛˊ ㄇㄧㄣˊ ㄉㄚˋ ㄏㄨㄟˋ
- Wade–Giles: Kuo²-min² Ta⁴-hui⁴
Hakka
- Pha̍k-fa-sṳ: Koet-mìn Thai-fi
Southern Min
- Hokkien POJ: Kok-bîn Tāi-hōe
- Tâi-lô: Kok-bîn Tāi-huē

The National Assembly was the authoritative legislative body of the Republic of China (the contemporary government of Taiwan), from 1947 to 2005. Along with the Control Yuan (upper house) and the Legislative Yuan (lower house), the National Assembly formed the tricameral parliament of the Republic of China.

Similar to other electoral colleges, the National Assembly had elected the President and Vice President under the 1947 Constitution of the Republic of China with the role of the constituent assembly that aimed to amend the country's constitution.

The first National Assembly was elected in November 1947 and met in Nanjing in March 1948. However, in the next year, the Kuomintang-led government of the Republic of China lost mainland China in the Civil War and retreated to Taiwan. The National Assembly resumed its meeting in Taipei in 1954. In the 1990s, its parliamentary powers were gradually transferred to the Legislative Yuan and direct democracy exercised by the de facto residents before constitutional amendments made it a dormant body in 2000 and dissolved it (subject to a sunset clause) in 2005.

== History ==
=== Early Republican period ===
Calls for a National Assembly were part of the platform of the revolutionaries who ultimately overthrew the Qing dynasty. In response, the Qing dynasty formed the first assembly in 1910, but it was virtually powerless and intended only as an advisory body. In the early Republican Era, the bicameral National Assembly was established by the Beiyang government. The design referred to the structure of the United States Congress as Senate (參議院) and House of Representatives (眾議院). However, the Warlord Era with the interference of military power toward the constitution suppressed the authority and the reputation of the National Assembly.

The Chinese social and political science review quoted the institution's English name as National People's Congress during the drafting of constitution.

=== 1947 Constitution ===
In 1946, the Constituent Assembly promulgated a new constitution and the first National Assembly met in 1948 in Nanjing, the Chinese capital. Apart from the KMT, the only legal parties were the Democratic Socialist Party and the Youth Party.

Under the constitution, the main duty of the National Assembly was to elect the President and Vice President for terms of six years. It also had the right to recall or impeach the President and Vice President if they failed to fulfill their political responsibilities. According to "National Assembly Duties Act", the National Assembly could amend the constitution with a two-thirds majority, with at least three-quarters membership present, as well as to ratify constitutional amendments proposed by deputies of the Legislative Yuan. It also is the main authority to alter territorial boundaries per Article 4 of the constitution. The responsibilities of the deputies of the Assembly, as well as of the Assembly as a whole, were derived from the directions of Sun Yat-sen. At that time the NA served as a counterpart to the Supreme Soviet of the Soviet Union, with a Presidium of the National Assembly governing over its activities.

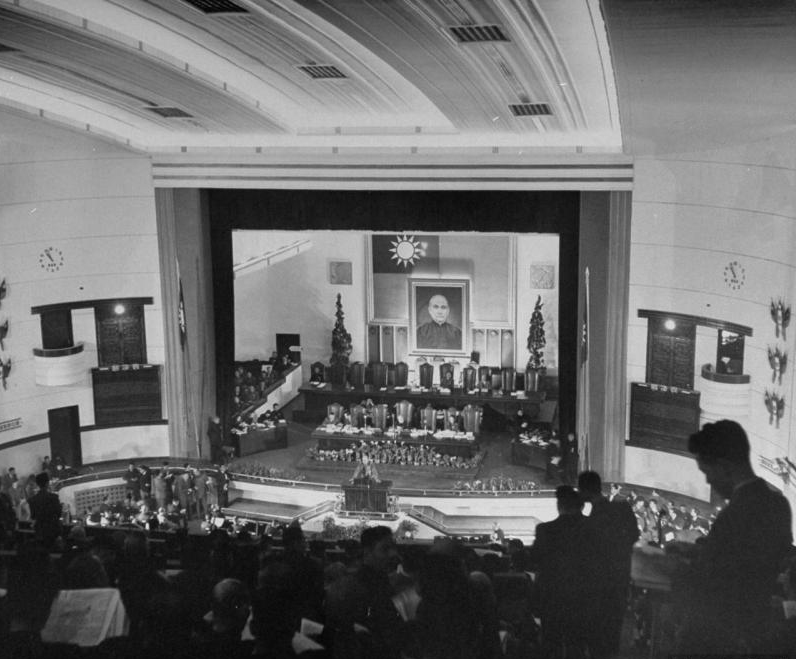
The National Assembly in Nanjing in 1946

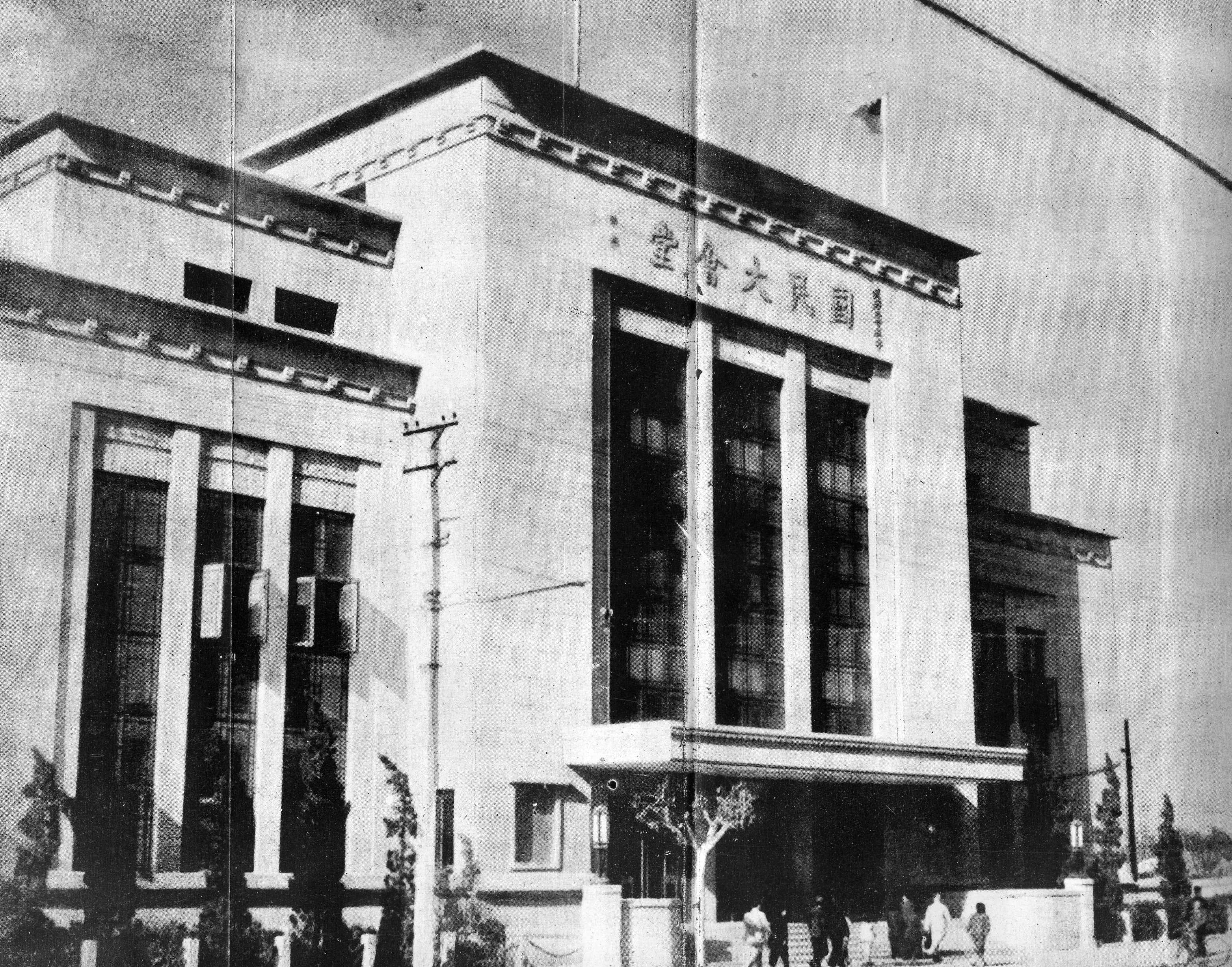
National Assembly Building in Nanjing, the meeting place of the first session of the first National Assembly in 1948

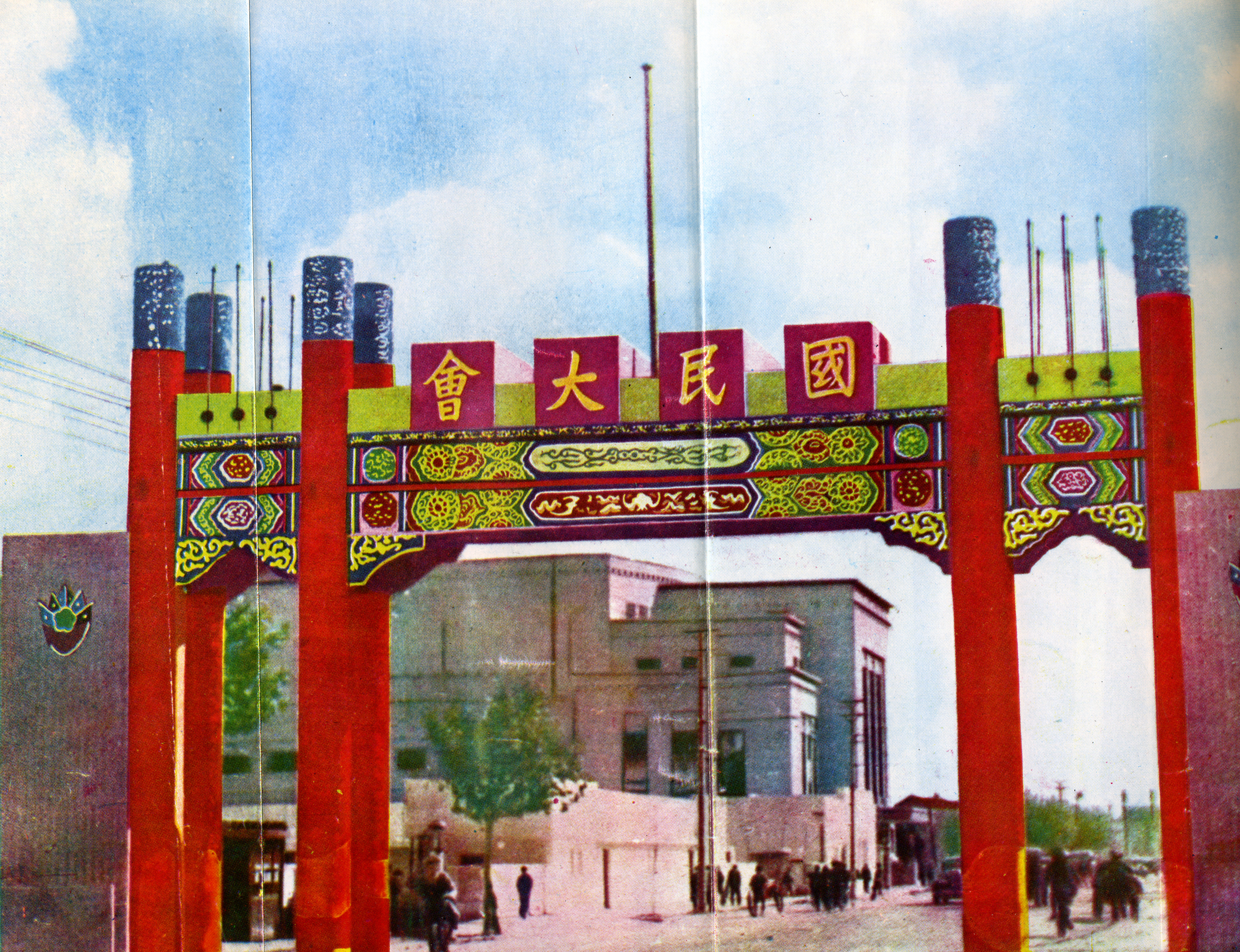
Paifang outside the National Assembly Building in Nanjing during the 1948 National Assembly session

In 1949, the Chinese Communist Party won the Chinese Civil War and mainland China became the People's Republic of China. The National Assembly (along with the entire ROC government) was relocated to Taipei. The Assembly's right to legislate was put into moratorium until at least half of all counties in the nation were again able to elect representatives via their County Assemblies.

The first National Assembly was to serve for a period of only six years. However, according to the Kuomintang (KMT) leadership, the fall of the Mainland made it impossible to hold new elections there, as all Mainland provinces were under Communist rebellion. As a result, the Judicial Yuan decided that the original members of the National Assembly representing Communist-controlled constituencies must continue to hold office until new elections could be held. National Assembly elections were still held in territories under ROC control.

In accordance with the 76th interpretation of the 1947 Constitution by the Judicial Yuan in 1957, the NA formed part of a three-chamber tricameral parliament together with the Legislative and Control Yuans and was the senior most chamber of parliament, with the latter two performing regular legislative work in the absence of the Assembly. During the years when it elected, recalled or impeached the president and vice president, it acted as an electoral college with all its county representatives serving as electors.

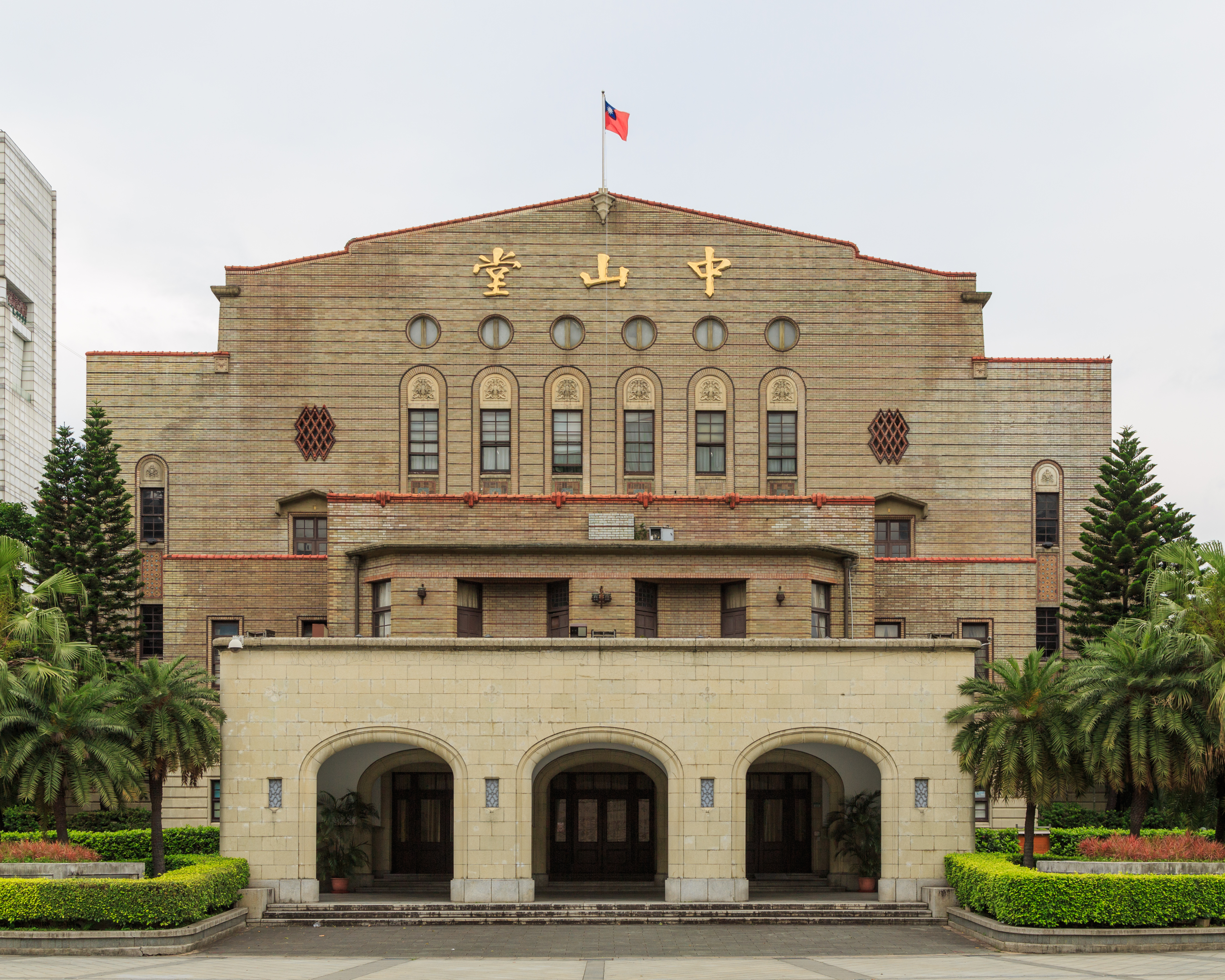
Zhongshan Hall, located in downtown Taipei, meeting place of the National Assembly between 1950 and 1966

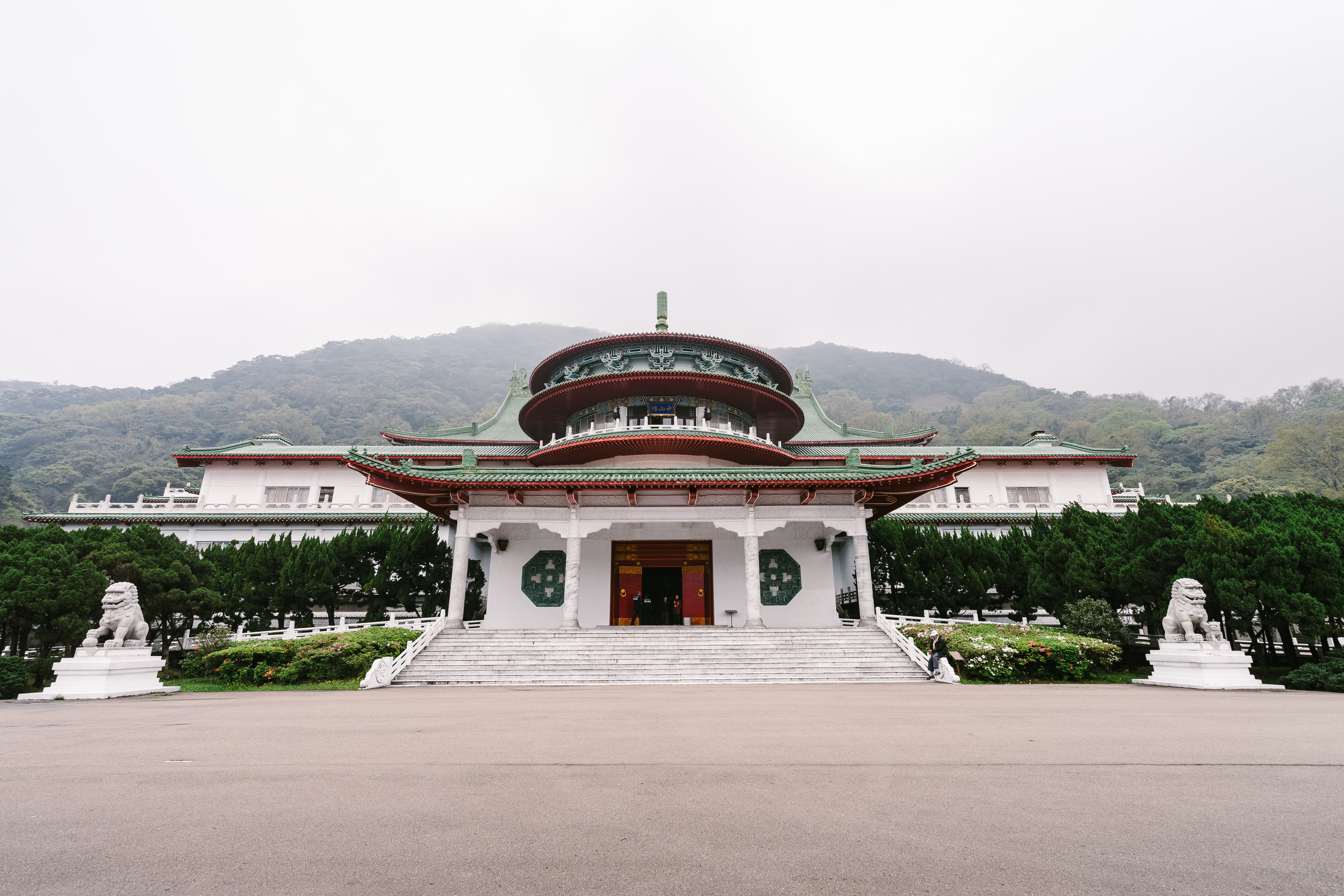
Chung-Shan Building, located in the Yangmingshan region of Taipei, meeting place of the National Assembly from 1972 to its dissolution in 2005

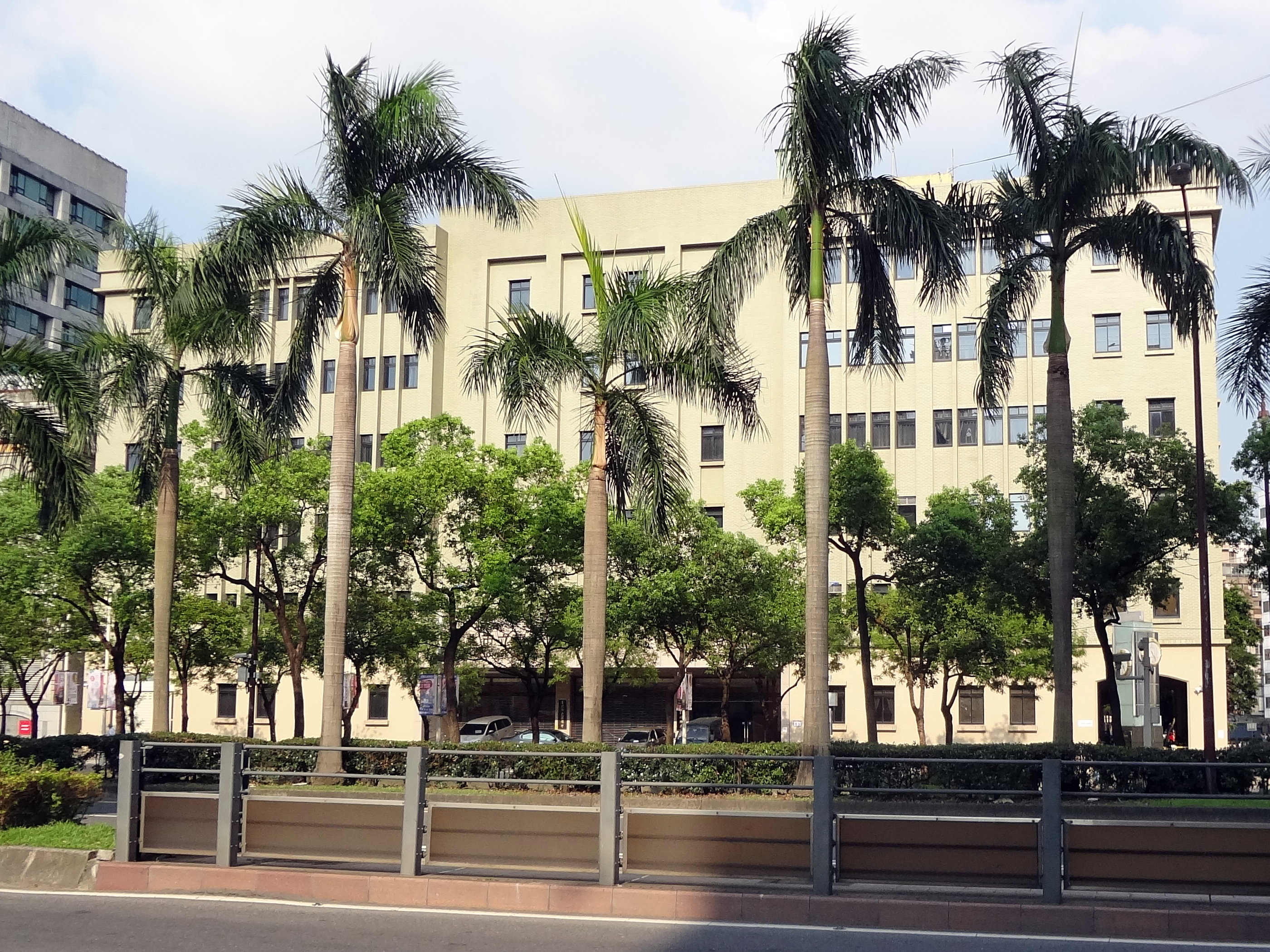
Secretariat building of the National Assembly, downtown Taipei

=== Constitutional reforms in the 1990s ===
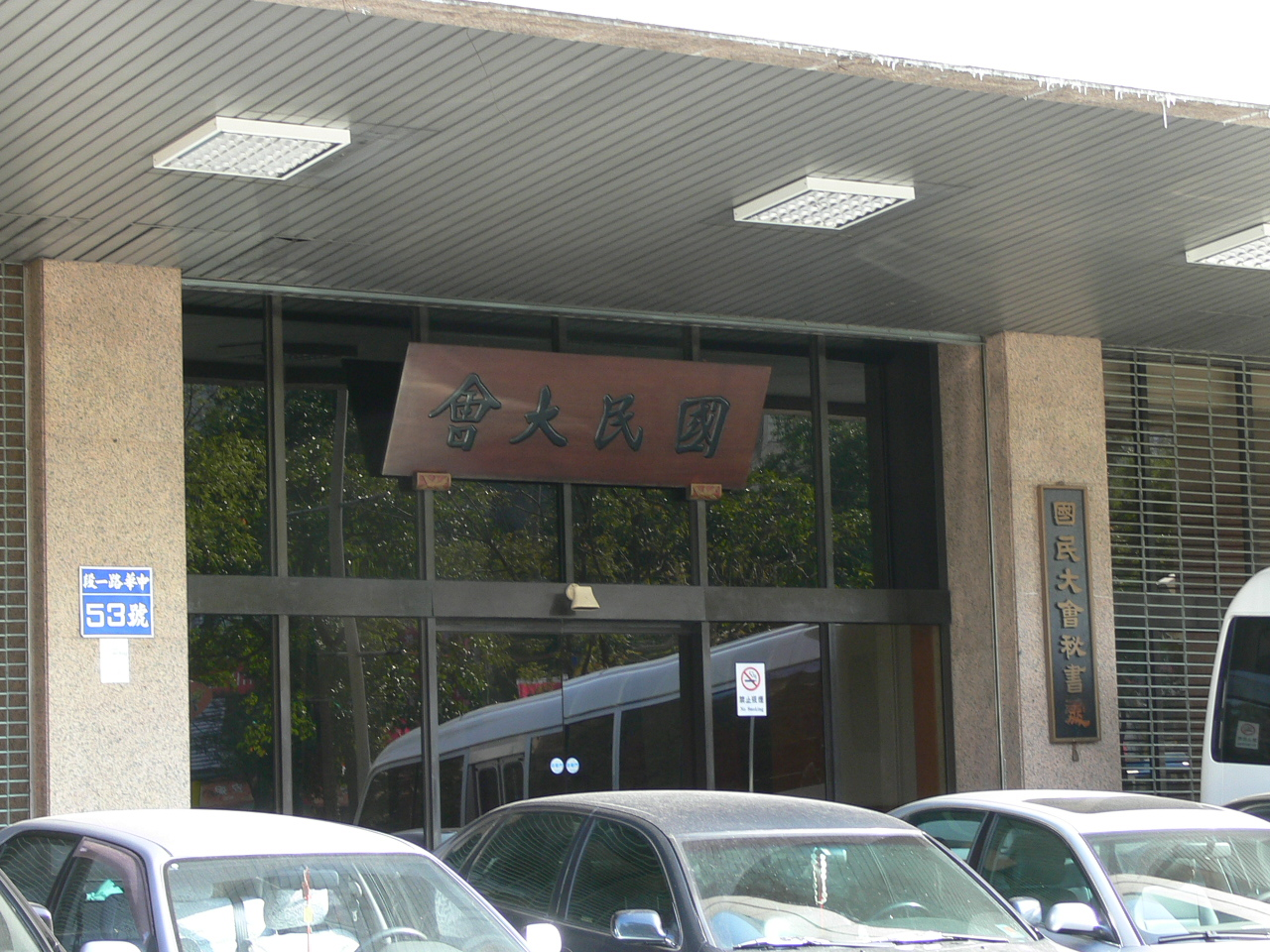
The Secretariat of National Assembly in Taipei.

As a result of this decision, the same National Assembly, elected in 1947, remained for 44 years until 1991, when as part of a constitutional ruling a Second National Assembly was elected. There was strong objection to the Assembly, which was derisively called the "Ten-thousand-year Congress" by critics.

Shortly after passing constitutional reforms in 1991, the National Assembly held direct elections in December. Following a 1994 constitutional amendment, the Assembly essentially became a permanent constituent assembly, as the Assembly's other major role, to elect the President and Vice President of the Republic of China, was abolished. Direct elections for the president, vice president, and Assembly were held simultaneously in March 1996. However, these reforms granted it new functions, such as hearing the president's State of the Nation Address and approving the president's nominations of the grand justices and the heads of the Examination and Control Yuans. Following the assembly's abolition, these functions are now in the hands of the Legislative Yuan.

In 1999, the Assembly passed constitutional amendments which would link its election and term with the Legislative Yuan. Part of these amendments' effect was to extend the term of both bodies, which was strongly criticized by the public. The People First Party was founded shortly after the 2000 presidential election. The two larger parties, the Kuomintang and Democratic Progressive Party, wished to bar the People First Party (PFP) from the National Assembly. As a result, the 2000 National Assembly elections were canceled, and delegates were to be selected ad hoc on the basis of proportional representation via special election within six months of the Legislative Yuan proposing constitutional amendments, calling for the impeachment of the president or vice president, or declaring a vote on changes to national borders. However, no such situation arose from 2000 to 2004, and the National Assembly never met during this period.

=== Dissolution ===
On 23 August 2004, the Legislative Yuan proposed a series of amendments that included dissolution of the National Assembly. The purpose of this proposal is to transfer power to ratify constitutional amendments and territorial amendments from the National Assembly to the people. Under the amendments, subsequent proposed amendments are to be approved by three-fourths of the present members in the Legislative Yuan, with at least three-fourths of all members present. It would then be promulgated for a period of 180 days and then submitted to a referendum, in which a simple majority of all eligible voters shall be sufficient to ratify the amendments. A Democratic Progressive Party proposal authorizing citizens' initiative rights to propose constitutional amendments was withdrawn after it became clear that such a proposal would not pass the Legislative Yuan. Opponents of such constitutional reforms argued that by eliminating the 3/4 legislative vote requirement, a relatively small number of voters could force a referendum on Taiwan independence which would trigger a crisis with the People's Republic of China. By contrast, keeping the 3/4 legislative vote requirement would mean that any constitutional amendment would require a consensus among both the pan-green coalition and pan-blue coalition to be considered. The requirement that a majority of all voters approve the amendment allows for a party to block an amendment by boycotting the vote as was done with the referendums voted on alongside the March 2004 presidential elections.

Under the Constitution at the time, the National Assembly must then be elected to consider these amendments. Such consideration and eventual ratification of the constitutional amendments was originally considered to be a formality, but a number of unexpected complications occurred in 2005. The first was the poor showing of the People First Party (PFP) in the 2004 Legislative Yuan election. The PFP was widely expected to merge with the KMT, but PFP Chairman James Soong became disenchanted by the idea. The second was the reluctance of the Taiwan Solidarity Union to pass the amendments. These amendments were seen by some Taiwan independence supporters as a prelude to a later declaration of independence, but the results of the 2004 election made this very unlikely. Faced with this outcome, the TSU became very reluctant to support a reform that would make elections by small parties such as itself harder.

Another unexpected event occurred which gave the National Assembly elections on 14 May 2005 more significance than had been intended: the election was lined up immediately after trips to mainland China by KMT Chairman Lien Chan and PFP Chairman James Soong. This had the effect of turning the May 14 elections into an opinion poll on relations with mainland China which was undesired by the Democratic Progressive Party, though the DPP subsequently gained a plurality in the elections.

2005 Taiwanese National Assembly election result
Government	249	Opposition	51
Democratic Progressive Party	127	Taiwan Solidarity Union	21
Kuomintang	117	People First Party	18
Chinese People's Party	3	Democratic Action Alliance	5
Peasant Party	1	New Party	3
Civil Party	1	Non-Partisan Solidarity Union	2
		Taiwan Independence Party	1
		Independent	1
Endorse the constitutional amendment		Oppose the constitutional amendment	

On 7 June 2005, the 300 delegates voted (by a majority of 249 to 48) the constitutional amendments into effect, and so dissolved the National Assembly until the "unification of the country" as stated in the preamble.

== Functions ==
The National Assembly held the most important constitutional powers within the national organs under the 1947 constitution. All of its powers were transferred to the Legislative Yuan and direct democracy exercised by the citizens of the free area after a series of constitutional amendments as Additional Articles of the Constitution in the 1990s and early 2000s.

Functions of the National Assembly under 1947 Constitution		Current implementation
Article 4	Ratify alteration of the national territory	Proposed by Legislative Yuan and ratified by the citizens of the free area through a national referendum
Article 27	Elect the President and the Vice President	Direct presidential elections by the citizens of the free area
Article 27	Recall the President and the Vice President	Proposed by Legislative Yuan and passed by Taiwanese people through a recall election
Article 27 and Article 174	Amend the Constitution	Proposed by Legislative Yuan and ratified by the citizens of the free area through a national referendum
Article 27 and Article 174	Ratify proposed Constitutional amendments from Legislative Yuan	Proposed by Legislative Yuan and ratified by the citizens of the free area through a national referendum
Article 30 and Article 100	Vote on impeachment of the President or the Vice President received from Control Yuan	Proposed by Legislative Yuan and judged by the Justices of the Judicial Yuan in Constitutional Court

- Procedure for ratification of national territory alteration was changed to be proposed by Legislative Yuan and ratified by National Assembly elected after the proposal has been made in the 2000 amendment (6th), and then the final ratification power was transferred to the citizens of the free area in the 2005 amendment (7th).
- Power to elect President and the Vice President was transferred to the citizens of the free area in the 1992 amendment (2nd), and then further clarified to be in form of "direct election" in the 1994 amendment (3rd). See Presidential elections in Taiwan.
- Procedure to recall the President and the Vice President was changed to be proposed by the National Assembly and voted by the citizens of the free area in the 1994 amendment (3rd), and changed to be proposed by the Legislative Yuan and voted by the citizens of the free area in the 2000 amendment (6th).
- Procedure for ratification of constitutional amendment was changed to be proposed by Legislative Yuan and ratified by National Assembly elected after the proposal has been made in the 2000 amendment (6th), and then the final ratification power was transferred to the citizens of the free area in the 2005 amendment (7th).
- Procedure to impeach the President and the Vice President was changed to be proposed by the Legislative Yuan and voted by the National Assembly in the 1997 amendment (4th), and the final decision power was moved to be judged by the Justices of the Judicial Yuan in Constitutional Court in the 2005 amendment (7th).

The series of constitutional amendments coined the Additional Articles of the Constitution as the current fundamental law of Taiwan. During the evolution of the Additional Articles, the National Assembly also held the power to confirm some important governmental officers to maintain the separation of powers during the government reorganization.

Office	Original Constitution (1947–1992)	Additional Articles (1992–2000)	Current implementation
Judicial Yuan	Leaders and members are nominated by the President and confirmed by the Control Yuan (Article 79)	Leaders and members are nominated by the President and confirmed by the National Assembly	Leaders and members are nominated by the President and confirmed by the Legislative Yuan
Examination Yuan	Leaders and members are nominated by the President and confirmed by the Control Yuan (Article 84)	Leaders and members are nominated by the President and confirmed by the National Assembly	Leaders and members are nominated by the President and confirmed by the Legislative Yuan
Control Yuan	Members are elected by provincial legislators (Article 91); Leaders are elected by and from the members (Article 92)	Leaders and members are nominated by the President and confirmed by the National Assembly	Leaders and members are nominated by the President and confirmed by the Legislative Yuan

== Elections and terms ==
The Kuomintang-led government of the Republic of China retreated to Taiwan in 1949, two years after the first election was held in China. As Kuomintang insists to claim the sovereignty over the whole China, the term of the members were extended until "re-election is possible in their original electoral district." In response to the increasing democracy movement in Taiwan, limited supplementary elections were held in Taiwan starting from 1969 and parts of Fujian from 1972. Members elected in these supplementary elections served together with the members who were elected in 1948. This situation remained until a Constitutional Court (Judicial Yuan) ruling on June 21, 1991, that ordered the retirement of all members with extended terms by the end of year 1991.

Term	Length	Actual served	Election	Seats	Note
1st	Initially 6 years, then limit removed by Temporary Provisions	Mar 27, 1948—Dec 31, 1991 (See Note column for detailed terms)	1947 election	2961	The only election held in mainland China. 19 delegates were elected in Taiwan. 1578 delegates retreated to Taiwan with the government, 565 delegates served until the end of 1991.
1st	Initially 6 years, then limit removed by Temporary Provisions	Mar 27, 1948—Dec 31, 1991 (See Note column for detailed terms)	1969 supp	15	Elected in the Free Area, terms equal to the 1947-elected members
1st	Initially 6 years, then limit removed by Temporary Provisions	Mar 27, 1948—Dec 31, 1991 (See Note column for detailed terms)	1972 1st supp	53	Elected in the Free Area with 6-year term; then extended to 8 years.
1st	Initially 6 years, then limit removed by Temporary Provisions	Mar 27, 1948—Dec 31, 1991 (See Note column for detailed terms)	1980 2nd supp	76	Elected in the Free Area with 6-year term.
1st	Initially 6 years, then limit removed by Temporary Provisions	Mar 27, 1948—Dec 31, 1991 (See Note column for detailed terms)	1986 3rd supp	84	Elected in the Free Area with 6-year term, served until the end of 1992, overlapping with the 2nd assembly.
2nd	Jan 1, 1992 to end of 8th President term	Jan 1, 1992—May 19, 1996	1991 election	325	Total re-election in the Free Area
3rd	4 years	May 20, 1996—May 19, 2000	1996 election	334	
ad hoc	1 month	May 20, 2005—Jun 7, 2005	2005 election	300	Last election

Timeline of National Assembly elections and terms

== National Assembly sessions ==
Term	Session	Date	Important decisions	Delegates	Meeting Place	
1st	1st	Mar 29, 1948—May 1, 1948	Ratified the Temporary Provisions against the Communist Rebellion; 1st presidential election (President: Chiang Kai-shek, Vice President: Li Zongren)	1947	National; Great Hall	Nanjing
1st	2nd	Feb 19, 1954—Mar 25, 1954	Amended the Temporary Provisions, removed its expiration date; Impeached Vice President Li Zongren; 2nd presidential election (President: Chiang Kai-shek, Vice President: Chen Cheng)	1947	Zhongshan; Hall	Taipei
1st	3rd	Feb 20, 1960—Mar 25, 1960	Amended the Temporary Provisions, removed two-term limit of the President; 3rd presidential election (President: Chiang Kai-shek, Vice President: Chen Cheng)	1947	Zhongshan; Hall	Taipei
1st	interim	Feb 1, 1966—Feb 8, 1966	Amended the Temporary Provisions, extended its power to create or review laws	1947	Zhongshan; Hall	Taipei
1st	4th	Feb 19, 1966—Mar 25, 1966	Amended the Temporary Provisions to perform limited legislative elections in Taiwan; 4th presidential election (President: Chiang Kai-shek, Vice President: Yen Chia-kan)	1947	Zhongshan; Hall	Taipei
1st	5th	Feb 20, 1972—Mar 25, 1972	Amended the Temporary Provisions, authorized President to reorganize central government; 5th presidential election (President: Chiang Kai-shek, Vice President: Yen Chia-kan)	1947, 1969	Chung-Shan; Building	Taipei
1st	6th	Feb 19, 1978—Mar 25, 1978	6th presidential election (President: Chiang Ching-kuo, Vice President: Hsieh Tung-min)	1947, 1969, 1972	Chung-Shan; Building	Taipei
1st	7th	Feb 20, 1984—Mar 25, 1984	7th presidential election (President: Chiang Ching-kuo, Vice President: Lee Teng-hui)	1947, 1969, 1980	Chung-Shan; Building	Taipei
1st	8th	Feb 19, 1990—Mar 30, 1990	8th presidential election (President: Lee Teng-hui, Vice President: Lee Yuan-tsu)	1947, 1969, 1986	Chung-Shan; Building	Taipei
1st	2nd interim	Apr 8, 1991—Apr 24, 1991	Repealed the Temporary Provisions against the Communist Rebellion; Ratified the Additional Articles of the Constitution (1st amendment)	1947, 1969, 1986	Chung-Shan; Building	Taipei
2nd	interim	Mar 20, 1992—May 30, 1992	Amended the Additional Articles of the Constitution (2nd amendment); Renounced its right to elect the President	1986, 1991	Chung-Shan; Building	Taipei
2nd	2nd interim	Dec 25, 1992—Jan 30, 1993		1986, 1991	Chung-Shan; Building	Taipei
2nd	3rd interim	Apr 9, 1993—Apr 30, 1993		1991	Chung-Shan; Building	Taipei
2nd	4th interim	May 2, 1994—Sep 2, 1994	Amended the Additional Articles of the Constitution (3rd amendment); Confirmed the President shall be directly elected by Taiwanese people since 1996 (9th)	1991	Chung-Shan; Building	Taipei
2nd	5th	Jul 11, 1995—Aug 17, 1995		1991	Chung-Shan; Building	Taipei
3rd	1st	Jul 7, 1996—Aug 30, 1996		1996	Chung-Shan; Building	Taipei
3rd	2nd	May 5, 1997—Jul 23, 1997	Amended the Additional Articles of the Constitution (4th amendment)	1996	Chung-Shan; Building	Taipei
3rd	3rd	Jul 21, 1998—Aug 10, 1998; Dec 7, 1998—Jan 25, 1999		1996	Chung-Shan; Building	Taipei
3rd	4th	Jun 8, 1999—Sep 3, 1999	Amended the Additional Articles of the Constitution (5th amendment) (this amendment was then voided by the Judicial Yuan order)	1996	Chung-Shan; Building	Taipei
3rd	5th	Apr 8, 2000—May 19, 2000	Amended the Additional Articles of the Constitution (6th amendment); Changed itself to an ad hoc constitutional convention	1996	Chung-Shan; Building	Taipei
ad hoc	1st	May 30, 2005—Jun 7, 2005	Amended the Additional Articles of the Constitution (7th amendment); National Assembly abolished	2005	Chung-Shan; Building	Taipei

- Functions of the National Assembly are now exercised by the constitutional referendums by Taiwanese people, Legislative Yuan and Constitutional Court of Judicial Yuan.

== Leaders of the National Assembly ==
=== Secretary-general ===
When the Assembly is not in session, the secretary-general (Chinese: 秘書長; pinyin: Mìshūzhǎng; Pe̍h-ōe-jī: Pì-su-tiúⁿ) is the de facto highest-ranking official, in charge of the overall affairs of the Assembly and supervising its staff. Note that the secretary-general is entitled acting secretary-general when the National Assembly is not in session.

No.	Name		Constituency	Term of Office		Political Party	Term	President
1	Hung Lan-yu	洪蘭友	Not a member	22 November 1947	28 September 1958	Kuomintang	1st	Chiang Kai-shek
2	Ku Cheng-kang	谷正綱	Anshun, Guizhou	15 December 1959	16 June 1966	Kuomintang	1st	Chiang Kai-shek
3	Kuo Cheng	郭澄	Yangqu, Shanxi	16 June 1966	10 June 1972	Kuomintang	1st	Chiang Kai-shek
—	Chen Chien-chung	陳建中	Fuping, Shaanxi	10 June 1972	20 September 1976	Kuomintang	1st	Chiang Kai-shek; Yen Chia-kan
4	Kuo Cheng	郭澄	Yangqu, Shanxi	20 September 1976	29 September 1980	Kuomintang	1st	Yen Chia-kan; Chiang Ching-kuo
5	Ho Yi-wu	何宜武	Shouning, Fujian	October 1980	September 1990	Kuomintang	1st	Chiang Ching-kuo; Lee Teng-hui
6	Chu Shih-lieh	朱士烈	Zhushan, Hubei	September 1990	January 1992	Kuomintang	1st	Lee Teng-hui
7	Chen Chin-jang	陳金讓	Party list	31 January 1992	September 1996	Kuomintang	2nd	Lee Teng-hui
8	Chen Chuan	陳川	Party list	September 1996	19 May 2003	Kuomintang	3rd	Lee Teng-hui; Chen Shui-bian
—	Chien Lin Hui-chun	錢林慧君	Party list	26 May 2005	31 May 2005	Taiwan Solidarity Union	ad hoc	Chen Shui-bian
9	Yeh Jiunn-rong	葉俊榮	Party list	31 May 2005	7 June 2005	Democratic Progressive Party	ad hoc	Chen Shui-bian

=== Presidium and Speaker ===
- The 1st and 2nd National Assemblies elected a presidium (Chinese: 主席團; pinyin: Zhǔxítuán; Pe̍h-ōe-jī: Chú-se̍k-thoân) as the leader of the body.
- The 3rd National Assembly elected a speaker (Chinese: 議長; pinyin: Yìzhǎng; Pe̍h-ōe-jī: Gī-tiúⁿ) and a deputy speaker (Chinese: 副議長; pinyin: Fùyìzhǎng; Pe̍h-ōe-jī: Hù-gī-tiúⁿ) to lead the assembly.
- The 2005 ad hoc National Assembly reverted to electing a presidium (Chinese: 主席團; pinyin: Zhǔxítuán; Pe̍h-ōe-jī: Chú-se̍k-thoân) as the leader of the body.

Speakers and Deputy Speakers of the 3rd National Assembly
No.	Session		Speaker			Deputy Speaker			President
No.	Starts on	Ends on	Portrait	Name (Birth–Death)	Political Party	Portrait	Name (Birth–Death)	Political Party	President
1	8 July 1996	13 January 1999		Fredrick Chien 錢復 (1935–); MNA for Nationwide KMT at-large №1	Kuomintang		Hsieh Lung-sheng 謝隆盛 (1941–2006); MNA for Nationwide KMT at-large №3	Kuomintang	Lee Teng-hui (KMT)
2	13 January 1999	8 September 1999		Su Nan-cheng 蘇南成 (Note: Resigned for forwarding a term-extension amendment, which was ruled unconstitutional by the Judicial Yuan.) (1936–2014); MNA for Nationwide KMT at-large №8	Kuomintang		Chen Chin-jang 陳金讓 (1935–); MNA for Nationwide KMT at-large №2	Kuomintang	Lee Teng-hui (KMT)
2	8 September 1999	19 May 2000	Deputy Speaker served as the acting Speaker				Chen Chin-jang 陳金讓 (1935–); MNA for Nationwide KMT at-large №2	Kuomintang	Lee Teng-hui (KMT)

The 2005 ad hoc National Assembly elected a presidium with 11 members as follows:

Presidium of the 2005 ad hoc National Assembly
Order	Name		Political Party	Order	Name		Political Party
1	Yeh Chu-lan	葉菊蘭	Democratic Progressive Party	7	Lee Yuan-chen	李元貞	Democratic Progressive Party
2	Chen Chin-jang	陳金讓	Kuomintang	8	Nancy Chao	趙麗雲	Kuomintang
3	Annie Lee	李安妮	Taiwan Solidarity Union	9	Hsu Chih-hsiung	許志雄	Democratic Progressive Party
4	Yeh Yao-peng	葉耀鵬	People First	10	Ger Yeong-kuang	葛永光	Kuomintang
5	Chou Ching-yu	周清玉	Democratic Progressive Party	11	Wellington Koo	顧立雄	Democratic Progressive Party
6	Tsai Cheng-wen	蔡政文	Kuomintang				

== See also ==
- Nanjing Great Hall of the People
- Zhongshan Hall
- Chung-Shan Building
- United States Electoral College
- Supreme Soviet of the Soviet Union
- National People's Congress
- Legislative Yuan
- Eternal Parliament
