= 1954 Taiwanese presidential election =

- March 22, 1954
- Presidential election
- Turnout: 53.19%
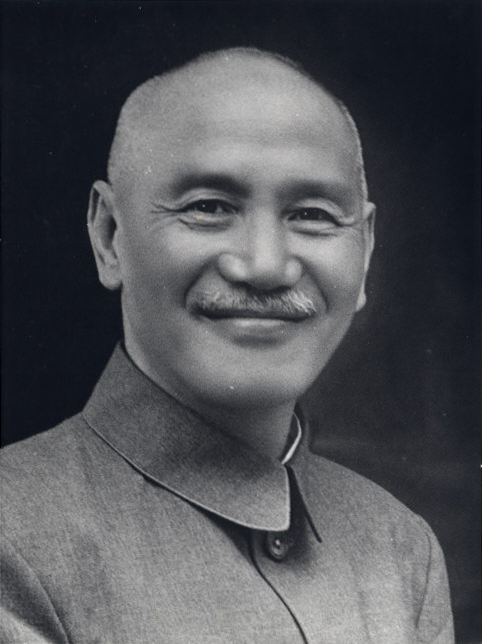

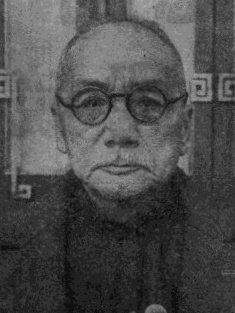
Nominee	Chiang Kai-shek	Hsu Fu-lin
Party	Kuomintang	Democratic Socialist
Running mate	Chen Cheng	Shih Chih-chuan
Electoral vote	1,507	48
Percentage	96.91%	3.09%
President before election
Chiang Kai-shek
Kuomintang
Elected President
Chiang Kai-shek
Kuomintang

Indirect presidential elections were held in the Republic of China on March 22, 1954 to elect the President and Vice President. The vote took place at the Chung-Shan Hall in Taipei. Incumbent President Chiang Kai-shek was re-elected for the second term. The premier Chen Cheng was elected to be the Vice-President. These were the first elections that took place since the fall of the mainland to the Chinese Communist Party in 1949.

== Electors ==
The election was conducted by the National Assembly in its meeting place Chung-Shan Hall in Taipei. According to the Temporary Provisions against the Communist Rebellion, the term of the delegates who were elected during the 1947 Chinese National Assembly election was extended indefinitely until "re-election is possible in their original electoral district". In total, there were 1,578 delegates reported to the secretariat to attend this second session of the first National Assembly.

The 1947 National Assembly election elected 2,961 delegates for the 3,045 seats of the National Assembly. About half of them did not flee to Taiwan with the government. The 1,578 delegates reported to this session barely passed the 50% requirement (1,523) of the National Assembly to hold a valid meeting.

== Results ==
=== President ===
Candidate	Party	Votes	%
Chiang Kai-shek	Kuomintang	1,507	96.91
Hsu Fu-lin	China Democratic Socialist Party	48	3.09
Total		1,555	100.00
Valid votes		1,555	98.73
Invalid/blank votes		20	1.27
Total votes		1,575	100.00
Registered voters/turnout		2,961	53.19
Source: Schafferer

=== Vice-president ===
Candidate	Party	Votes	%
Chen Cheng	Kuomintang	1,417	92.86
Shih Chih-chuan	China Democratic Socialist Party	109	7.14
Total		1,526	100.00
Valid votes		1,526	97.26
Invalid/blank votes		43	2.74
Total votes		1,569	100.00
Registered voters/turnout		2,961	52.99
Source: Schafferer

== See also ==
- History of Republic of China
- President of the Republic of China
- Vice President of the Republic of China
