= Mo Teh-hui =

Taiwanese politician (1883–1968)

- 莫德惠
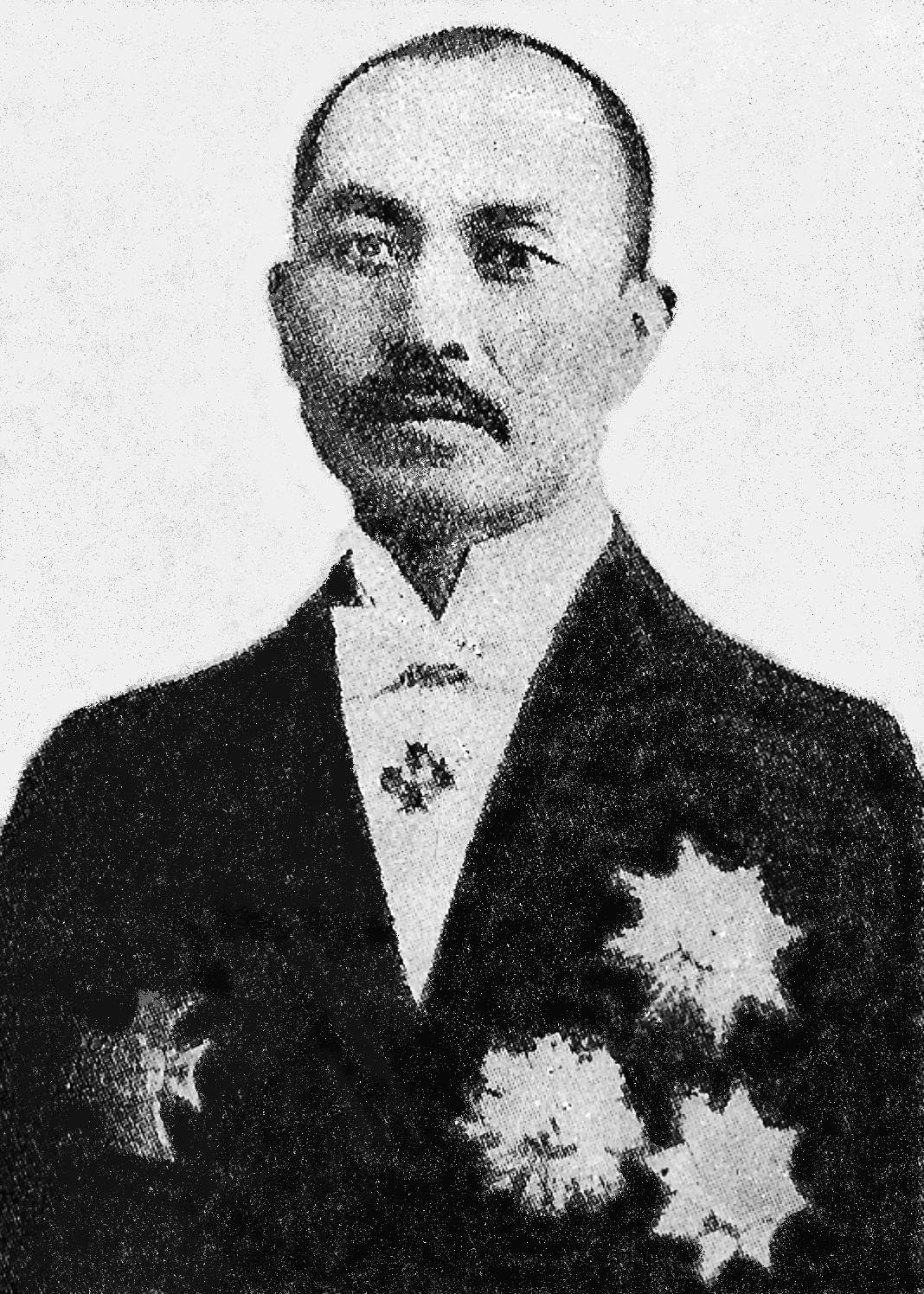

Civil Governor of Fengtian
- In office April 7, 1926 – October 3, 1927
- Succeeded by: Liu Shangqing as Chairman of the Fengtian Provincial Government

Personal details
- Born: 1883 Xinjiang, Qing Dynasty
- Died: April 17, 1968 (aged 84–85) Taipei, Taiwan

Chinese name
- Chinese: 莫德惠
Transcriptions
Standard Mandarin
- Hanyu Pinyin: Mò Déhùi
- Wade–Giles: Mo Teh-hui

Courtesy name
- Chinese: 柳忱
Transcriptions
Standard Mandarin
- Hanyu Pinyin: Liǔchén

Mo Teh-hui (Chinese: 莫德惠; pinyin: Mò Déhùi; Wade–Giles: Mo Teh-hui; 1883 in Xinjiang Province, Qing Dynasty – April 17, 1968 in Taipei, Taiwan) was a nationalist Chinese politician.

== Biography ==
Mo was born in 1883 in Xinjiang, to a Uyghur mother and Manchu father. He was born while his father was serving under General Zuo Zongtang in the Dungan revolt (1862–77), fighting against Yaqub Beg in Xinjiang. Mo's family then moved to a part of Jilin, a former province which is now part of Heilongjiang. Mo's political career started in 1921, in Binjiang County (near Harbin) of Manchuria. As the county magistrate, Mo divided the county into five defense districts coterminous with the regular police districts, and recruited men into the constabulary to defend the whole county against bandits. He held that post until 1912, when he was elected to the provisional National Assembly of the newly established Republic of China.

He was Acting Minister of Agriculture and Commerce (1925) and Minister of Agriculture and Industry (1927–28) of China and, in the interim, served as the Civil Governor of Fengtian. In the Huanggutun Incident of 1928, he was on the same train with Marshall Zhang Zuolin and fortunately escaped with only a leg injury.

Following the reorganization of the Chinese Eastern Railway in 1929 and after the conclusion of the Sino-Russian complications, Mo was appointed president of the Board of Directors ("duban") of the railway. He was later appointed as the official representative of the Chinese Government for the purpose of negotiating a settlement of outstanding problems pertaining to the administration of the C.E.R. He was appointed plenipotentiary delegate to the Sino-Russian Conference at Moscow in May 1930. Mo visited USSR for up to 25 talks, but returned to China in December 1930 due to a deadlock of the conference. After Japan's Invasion of Manchuria on September 18, 1931, the USSR sold its interests in C.E.R. to Japan's puppet state Manchukuo.

In 1938, Mo became a nonpartisan member of the National Political Assembly at Chongqing, the National Government's wartime seat, and was named chairman of the assembly's presidium in 1942. After the war, he served as a nonpartisan delegate to the Political Consultative Conference. He was also a delegate to the National Assembly when it reconvened later in 1946, and was elected vice chairman of the commission for the supervision of the enforcement of constitutional government, becoming its chairman in September 1948. He served on the State Council in 1947-48, and ran for the Vice Presidency of the Republic of China in 1948. He was appointed as the president of the Examination Yuan, after the Kuomintang retreated from the mainland to the island of Taiwan (1954–66).

== See also ==
- Warlord era
- Central Plains War
- Mukden Incident
- Xi'an incident
- Chiang Kai-shek
- Madame Chiang Kai-shek
- History of the Republic of China
- National Revolutionary Army
- Whampoa Military Academy
- Second Sino-Japanese War
- Military of the Republic of China
- Politics of the Republic of China
- Sino-German cooperation (1911–1941)
- Chinese nationalism

Preceded by Chia Ching-teh	President of the Examination Yuan; September 1954 – August, 1966	Succeeded by Sun Fo
