= Liu Shangqing =

Chinese politician (1868–1947)

- 劉尚清
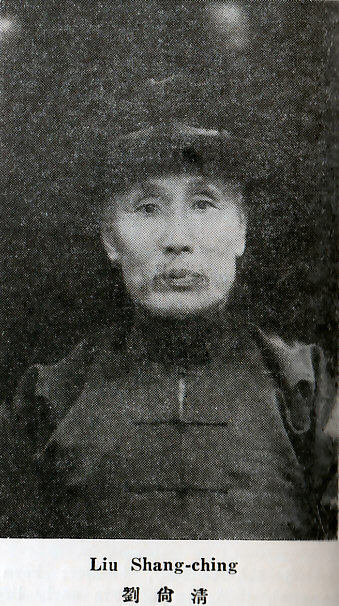

Vice President of the Control Yuan
- In office 27 December 1941 – 20 February 1947
- President: Yu Youren
- Preceded by: Xu Chongzhi
- Succeeded by: Huang Shaohong

Chairman of the Anhui Provincial Government
- In office April 1937 – November 1937
- Preceded by: Liu Zhenhua
- Succeeded by: Jiang Zoubing

Minister of the Interior of the Republic of China
- In office December 1930 – December 1931
- Preceded by: Niu Yongjian
- Succeeded by: Zhang Wohua

Chairman of the Fengtian Provincial Government
- In office 1927–1928
- Preceded by: Mo Teh-hui as Civil Governor of Fengtian
- Succeeded by: Zhai Wenxuan

Minister of Agriculture and Industry (Beiyang)
- In office June 1927 – October 1927
- Preceded by: Yang Wenkai
- Succeeded by: Mo Teh-hui

President of Northeastern University
- In office November 1926 – August 1928
- Preceded by: Wang Yongjiang
- Succeeded by: Zhang Xueliang

Personal details
- Born: 1868 Tieling County, Fengtian, China
- Died: 20 February 1947 (aged 80) New York, United States
- Party: Kuomintang

Liu Shangqing (Chinese: 劉尚清; Wade–Giles: Liu Shang-ch'ing; 1868 – 20 February 1947) was a Chinese politician. He was also known by the courtesy name Haiquan (海泉).

== Life and career ==
Li was a native of Tieling County, Liaoning, which was then known as Fengtian. At the age of 20, Li began teaching at a private school. In 1911, he began working for the Viceroy of the Three Northeast Provinces. After completing his legal studies, Li was appointed to senior positions within the provincial bank. Li left to work for Zhang Zuolin.

In 1919, Li returned to public service as acting director of the Heilongjiang department of finance. He was formally appointed to the position the next year, and concurrently served as president of a bank in Yongji. Li became operations director of the Chinese Eastern Railway in September 1925. Li returned to his home province as director of the Fengtian department of finance in 1926. That November, Li took office as president of Northeastern University. In June 1927, Li was named agricultural minister of the Beiyang government on the advice of Zhang Zuolin, in place of Yang Wenkai. He returned to Fengtian in October to assume the governorship, yielding the agricultural portfolio to Mo Teh-hui. Li stepped down from Northeastern University in August 1928.

Shortly after Zhang Zoulin's death, his son and successor Zhang Xueliang declared that he would not oppose the Nationalist government. Subsequently, Liu also allied himself with the Nationalists, and was named interior minister in December 1930. He concurrently held other committee-level posts, and left the interior ministry in December 1931.

He returned to municipal government in Beijing in 1932. He left Beijing in 1937 to take several positions in the Anhui Provincial Government, all of which he had resigned by December. In December 1941, Liu became vice president of the Control Yuan. He fell ill and sought medical treatment in the United States soon after the end of the Second Sino-Japanese War.

He died in New York on 20 February 1947, aged 80. Liu was eventually returned to China, and interred at a cemetery in Haidian District on 16 August 1948.
