= Nanjing Great Hall of the People =

Building in Nanjing, China

- 南京人民大会堂
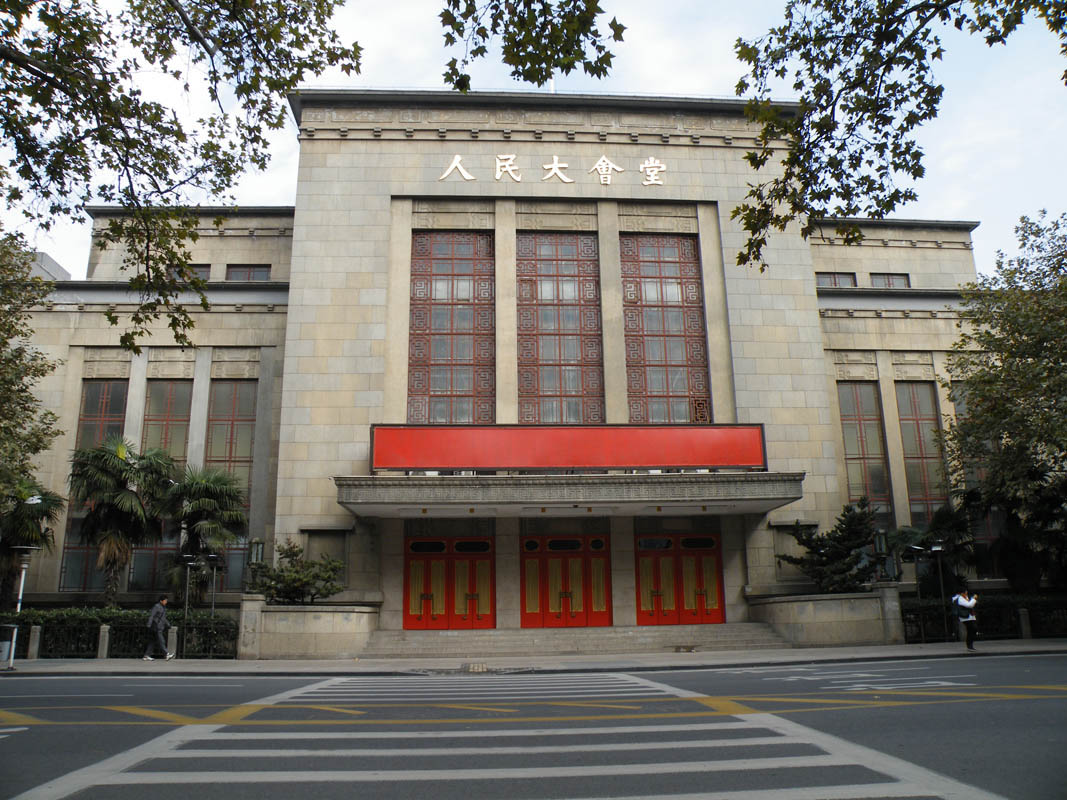
- Interactive map of the Nanjing Great Hall of the People area

General information
- Location: No. 264, Chang Jiang Road, Xuanwu, Nanjing, Jiangsu, China
- Coordinates: 32.0245°N 118.4716°E
- Current tenants: Jiangsu Provincial People's Congress
- Completed: 1936

The Nanjing Great Hall of the People (Chinese: 南京人民大会堂; pinyin: Nánjing rénmín dàhuìtáng), which serves as the Jiangsu Provincial People's Congress and the National Theatre of Drama and Music and Art Gallery, was built in 1936, and is located at No. 264, Changjiang Road, Xuanwu District, Nanjing, Jiangsu Province, China. The gross floor area being 5,100 square meters, the 4 story hall was built up of reinforced concrete, facing south. Its original name was the National Great Hall (Chinese: 國民大會堂) and the hall was renamed in 1949.

== History ==
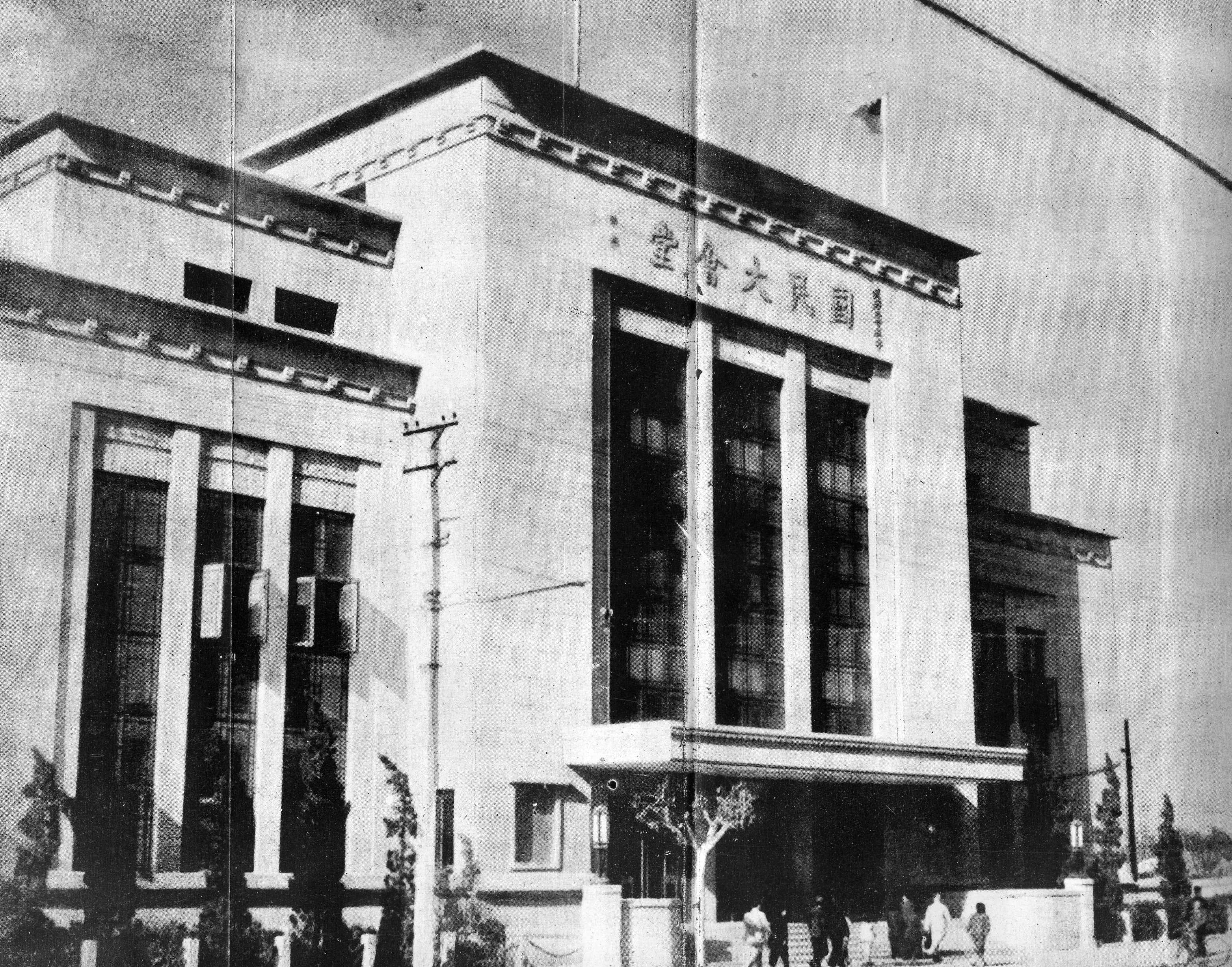
The building is the former site of the National Assembly of the Republic of China.

In September of the 24th year of the Republic of China (1935), the central committee of the KMT passed a resolution which approved the construction of a meeting hall for the National Assembly in Nanjing, the capital of China at that time. Since the National Assembly would only meet infrequently, the proposal submitted by H.H. Kung (Chinese: 孔祥熙) and four others also utilized the hall as the National Theatre of Drama and Music. The organizing committee of the National Theater of Drama and Music and the neighboring Art Gallery held a public bidding. According to the evaluation of the organizing committee, the design proposal of Xi Fuquan (Chinese: 奚福泉), an architect from the Gongli Engineering Department (Chinese: 公利工程司), was chosen as the best one, and Guan Songsheng's (Chinese: 关颂声), design and Zhaoshen's (Chinese: 赵深) ranked second and third respectively. On November 20, the organization announced the bidding in public, which was awarded to Shanghai Construction Factory of Lugen's Engineering Office (Chinese: 上海陆根记营造厂). The designer was Xi Fuquan, and the supervisor was Li Zongkan (Chinese: 李宗侃) from Tao's Engineering Office (Chinese: 陶记工程事务所). On May 5 of the 25th year of Republic of China (1936), the construction of the great hall was completed. The great hall was used as the National Theatre of Drama and Music as well.

== Building ==
Seen from the front, the middle part of the building is taller, with the two sides spreading symmetrically; the design emphasizes vertical lines with simplicity and modernism. In addition, cornices, doors and windows, canopies and hallway are decorated with simplified traditional Chinese patterns. There are more than 3,400 seats in the hall, which is equipped with automatic voting systems and translation devices. The hall is fully air conditioned, a very modern feature at the time it was built.

The National Art Gallery (modern day Jiangsu Provincial Art Museum) is located opposite the hall, and their style are in accordance with each other as an integral whole.

== Transportation ==
The building is accessible within walking distance north of Daxinggong Station of Nanjing Metro.

== See also ==
- Jiangsu Art Gallery
- National Assembly (Republic of China)
- Chung-Shan Building
