= Whampoa Clique =

The ruling clique of the Kuomintang led by Chiang Kai-shek.

Whampoa Clique 黃埔系
- Leader: Chiang Kai-shek; He Yingqin
- Ideology: Chiangism; Chinese nationalism Three Principles of the People; Anti-communism; Conservatism (Chinese); Syncretism
- Political position: Right-wing
- National affiliation: Kuomintang

Whampoa Clique (Chinese: 黃埔系; pinyin: Huángpù Xì), also known as the Huangpu Clique, was a faction within the Kuomintang led by Chiang Kai-shek. The Whampoa clique was the dominant force within the Kuomintang in the Republic of China until Chiang Kai-shek's death in 1975. The faction was made up of officers who graduated from the Republic of China Military Academy, formerly the Whampoa Military Academy from 1924-1926, which Chiang founded and served as commandant of by the direction of Sun Yat-sen. The military academy itself produced some of the most influential communist and nationalist generals and officers.

The prevalence of the clique was demonstrated by the fact that members of the clique and the graduates of the Whampoa Military Academy commanded every branch of the Republic of China Army and the National Revolutionary Army. The commander-in chief of the Army, Guan Linzheng, the Navy, Gui Yongqing, the Air Force, Wang Shuming, the military police, Luo Youlun, and the Military Intelligence Bureau, Dai Li.

== Background ==
In 1924, under the direction of Sun Yat-sen and with the aid of Soviet material aid and assistance, the Whampoa Military Academy was founded with Chiang as its commandant. It was established in Huangpu, Guangzhou, formerly romanized as Whampoa.

On the 5 June 1926, Chiang was declared commander-in-chief of the National Revolutionary Army and committed himself to completing Sun Yat-sen's long term goal of completing the Northern Expedition. His role as the sole commander of the KMT's armed wing solidified his influence and the influence of his growing political military clique from Whampoa.

== Republic of China ==
Following the Northeast Flag Replacement and the victory of the National Revolutionary Army, Chiang became the Chairman of the National Government of the Republic of China as well as the Chairman of the Military Affairs Commission. Chiang began a series of reforms known as the Nanjing decade.

During the Nanjing decade, the Whampoa Clique made up a half of all cardholding members of the Kuomintang.

=== Second Sino-Japanese War ===
Generals such as Sun Li-jen, Hu Su, Li Mi, and Chen Cheng were all largely members of the Whampoa Clique. Responsible for the education of hundreds of officers and generals, the Whampoa Clique was politically and militarily obliged to support the war, contrary to the Low-Key Club and several pacifist forces within the Kuomintang. The Whampoa Clique itself had previously been the main drivers of Sino-German relations and the Blue Shirts Society.

=== Fall of the Whampoa Clique in China ===
In the end, although the Chinese won, the damage done by the Japanese on the political and economic landscape of China had led to the drastic decline of support for both the Kuomintang and the Whampoa Clique on the mainland. The rise of Mao Zedong and the Chinese Communist Party, whom Chiang met with in 1945, could not be effectively stopped by the National Revolutionary Army.

Under the failure of the Marshall Mission, the Whampoa Clique itself had merged into an agglomeration of cliques during the retreat to Taiwan. The main mission of the Nationalist government in its entirely was to evacuate the 1.5 million remaining loyalists to Taiwan.

== Ideology ==
The ideology of the Whampoa Clique was rooted in remaining adherent to the Three Principles of the People and the legacy of Sun Yat-sen. In the academy, the so-called "Whampoa Spirit" was outlined as being loyal to the party and the country at all costs. Unofficially, the actual ideology of the Whampoa Clique was Chiangism. This consisted of the Three Principles of the People and Confucian ideals. The syncretic politics of Chiangism were defined by ideology borrowed from socialism, paternalistic conservatism, and ultranationalism.

Although Chiang Kai-shek and the Kuomintang received the backing of the United States, Chiang Kai-shek remained skeptical of American involvement in Taiwan and China; and efforts by the purported efforts by the Central Intelligence Agency to overthrow him. The Whampoa Clique itself had been rooted in anti-imperialism and anti-westernism, especially during the influence of the Blue Shirts Society.

=== Anti-communism, capitalism, and syncretism ===
Chiang Kai-shek and the rest of the Whampoa Clique heavily antagonized communists and leftists in the Kuomintang, for example, the Reorganization Group and Wang Jingwei, as well as the Shanghai Massacre. Although, Chiang simultaneously attacked and detracted the power of the capitalists in Shanghai. Chiang refused an outright alliance between the Green Gang and Shanghai capitalists who were both enemies of trade unionists and communists in Shanghai.

In Taiwan, Chiang performed land reform rooted in Georgism which was outlined by Sun Yat-sen in the Three Principles of the People. A tactic similar to what he performed against landowners in China, he seized land from large landowners and gave rise to smaller, government-loyal landlords.

Critics of Chiang and the Whampoa Clique describe Chiang's perceived syncretism and pragmatism as a political tactic to further authoritarian rule through the party-state in China rather than having moral or economic reasoning.
