= Tsotanhui Clique =

Tsotanhui Clique 座談會
- Leader: Chen Cheng
- Members: Kang Tse; Huang Shao-ku; Liu Chien-chun; Ni Wenya; Chao Tzu-chi; Yuan Shouqian; Chen Hsueh-ping; Wang Chang-hui; Chou Mu-wen
- Preceded by: Chen Cheng loyalists among Blue Shirts Society, Three Principles of the People Youth Corps and Republic of China Military Academy
- Ideology: Chiangism; Chen Cheng Thought; Conservatism (Chinese); Chinese nationalism Party-state capitalism
- Political position: Right-wing
- National affiliation: Kuomintang

Tsotanhui Clique (Chinese: 座談會派系; pinyin: Zuòtán Huì Pàixì; lit. 'Symposium Faction'), also known as the New Politics Club (Chinese: 新政俱樂部; pinyin: Xīnzhèng Jùlèbù), the Chen Cheng Clique (Chinese: 陳誠系; pinyin: Chén Chéng Xì), or the United Faction (Chinese: 團派; pinyin: Tuánpài; not to be confused with the Tuanpai), was a faction within the Kuomintang led by Chen Cheng. The clique was primarily composed of military officers and political instructors drawn from the Three Principles of the People Youth Corps, the Whampoa Military Academy, and the Blue Shirts Society, all of whom were loyal to Chen Cheng.

After the Kuomintang's retreat to Taiwan, the Tsotanhui Clique replaced the declining CC Clique as the most powerful faction within the party. However, with the rise of Chiang Ching-kuo, the faction gradually weakened and eventually lost its influence.

Following Chen Cheng’s death in 1965, the clique continued under new leadership, including Huang Shao-ku, Ni Wenya, Chao Tzu-chi.

The Tsotanhui Clique was the largest faction in the Legislative Yuan prior to the election, consisting of around 160 legislators. It was led by Legislative Yuan President Ni Wen-ya, Majority Leader Chao Tzu-chi, and KMT Legislative Branch Secretary-General Chou Mu-wen. The faction was widely recognized for its hawkish political stance. Contemporary magazines reported that Chao was known for influencing voting alignments within the legislature, particularly against political rivals such as Liu Kuo-tsai and Lee Huan.

New leadership of clique established the New Politics Development Foundation (Chinese: 新政建設基金會), with Huang Shao-ku serving as its first chairman and other board directors including Yuan Shouqian, Ni Wen-ya, Chao Tzu-chi, and Chen Li-an. Contemporary reports estimated the foundation’s assets at approximately NT$55 million.

During the intra-party struggles that followed Chiang Ching-kuo’s death, the clique lent its support to Lee Teng-hui in his confrontation with the KMT’s “non-mainstream faction” and backed the political career of Chen Li-an, the son of Chen Cheng.

In 1988, Chao Tzu-chi sought the position of Vice President of the Legislative Yuan but was defeated by Liang Su-yung. Because of the anonymous letter incident, the CC Clique leadership reportedly refused to support Chao, with one senior legislator stating, “We would rather vote for the Democratic Progressive Party.” In 1992, the Tsotanhui Clique donated its political funds and a 140-ping office to the Kuomintang headquarters, marking the dissolution of the faction.

== See also ==
- Reorganization Group
- CC Clique
