= Chu Chia-hua =

Chinese scientist, geologist and Kuomintang politician (1893–1963)

- 朱家驊
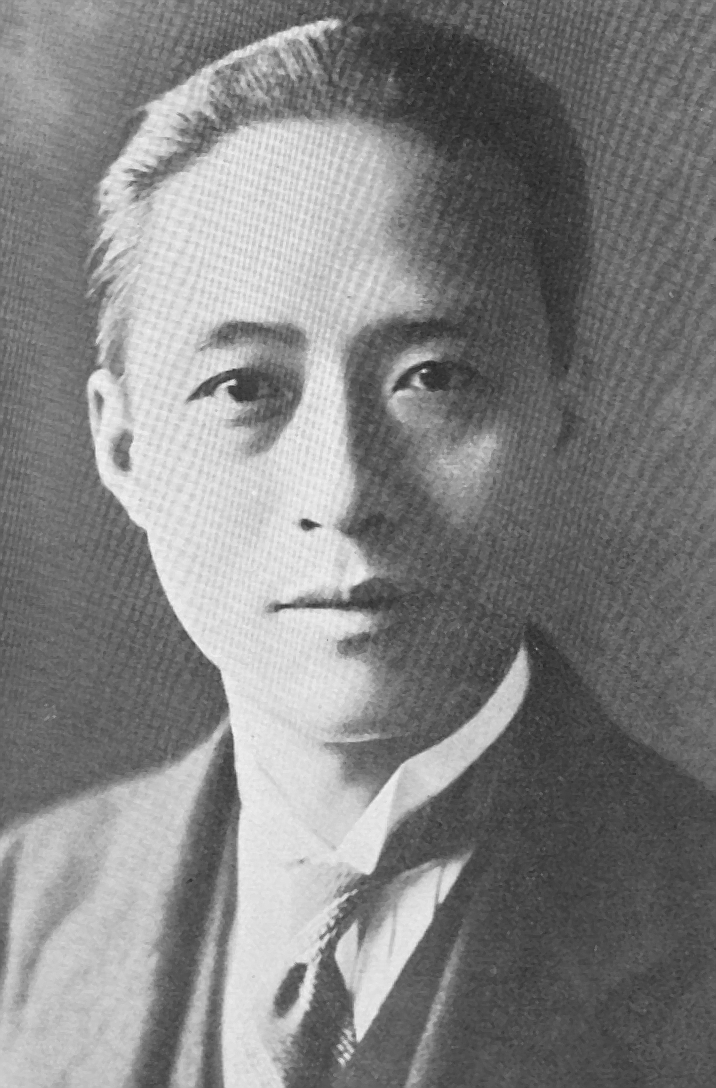

Vice Premier of the Republic of China
- In office 12 June 1949 – 12 March 1950
- Premier: Yan Xishan; Chen Cheng
- Preceded by: Chia Ching-teh
- Succeeded by: Chang Li-sheng

President of Academia Sinica
- In office 1940–1959
- Preceded by: Cai Yuanpei
- Succeeded by: Hu Shih

Personal details
- Born: 30 May 1893 Huzhou, Zhejiang, Qing Dynasty
- Died: 3 January 1963 (aged 69) Taiwan
- Party: Kuomintang
- Spouse(s): Cheng Yi-Jung (m. 1917; div. 1942) Wang Wen-yuan (m. 1946)
- Children: none
- Education: Technische Universität Berlin; University of Berlin (PhD); University of Bern

Zhu Jiahua or Chu Chia-hua (Chinese: 朱家驊; pinyin: Zhū Jiāhuá; 30 May 1893 – 3 January 1963) was a Chinese geologist, educator, and Kuomintang politician in the Republic of China. He served as Minister of Education (1931–1933, 1944–1948), Minister of Transportation and Communications (1932–1935), Secretary-General of the Kuomintang (1938–1939), head of Central Bureau of Investigation and Statistics (1938–1944), Head of Organization Department (1939–1944), President of the Academia Sinica (1940–1959) and Vice Premier (1949–1950).

Zhu was a pro-German figure within the Kuomintang, responsible for diplomatic engagement with Germany, hosting German officials, modeling administrative reforms on German systems, and advocating cooperation with Germany against Japan during the early years of the Second Sino-Japanese War. A protégé of Dai Jitao, Zhu was originally associated with the CC Clique but, with Chiang's support in 1938, withdrew from the faction and moved to counter its influence within the party.

Zhu was best known for his role in directing Nationalist China's cooperation with Nazi Germany and for advocating continued collaboration with Germany against Japan during the early years of the Second Sino-Japanese War. Beginning in 1927, he served as Chiang Kai-shek's liaison to German General Erich Ludendorff, and in 1933 he founded the Sino-German Cultural and Economic Association to promote bilateral ties.

== Early years and education (1893–1922) ==
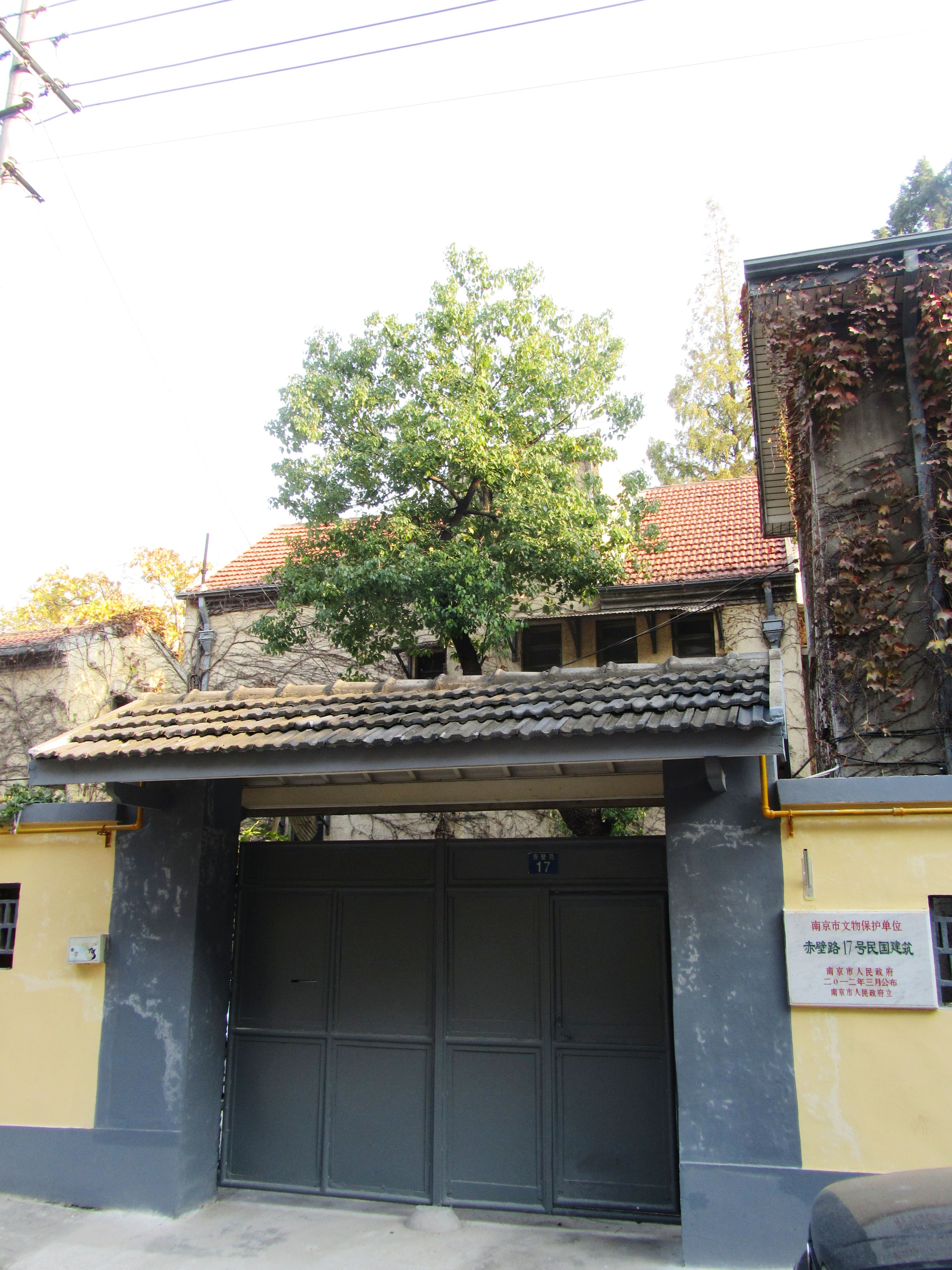
Former residence of Chu Chia-hua in Nanjing.

Zhu was born in 1893 in Wuxing, Zhejiang. He shared his ancestral home with several prominent political figures, including Chen Qimei's family—such as Chen Guofu, Chen Lifu, and Chen Tsu-li—as well as Zhang Renjie, Dai Jitao, Wu Ting-chang, Chu Minyi, and Pan Kung-chan. This shared regional network, often referred to by scholars as a form of native-place kinship, is considered one of the key factors behind Zhu's early political ascent.

Orphaned at a young age, Zhu was raised by his elder brother Zhu Xiangsheng, who worked in the salt industry under Zhang Renjie. Zhang's friend, senior Tongmenghui member Chou Po-nien, supported him in pursuing formal education.

In early 1908, at the age of 15, Zhu entered the medical faculty of Tongji University in Shanghai. Influenced by a speech delivered by Song Jiaoren, he joined the Tongmenghui and became involved in anti-Qing revolutionary activities. Following the success of the Xinhai Revolution in 1911, Zhu was recommended by Chen Qimei to study mining engineering at the Berlin University of Mining and Technology (Technische Hochschule Berlin) with financial support from the Kuomintang. His studies were interrupted by the outbreak of World War I, forcing him to return to China before completing his degree.

In 1917, Zhu returned to China and joined Peking University as a lecturer in German. During his tenure, he became acquainted with prominent intellectuals including Hu Shih, Tao Meng-he, Wang Hsing-kung, 何炳拱, Chen Ta-chi, and Ku Meng-yu, and briefly taught future scholars such as Luo Jialun and Chiang Fu-tsung. Following the end of World War I in 1918, Zhu returned to Germany and later earned a doctorate in geology from the University of Berlin in 1922.

Historian William C. Kirby notes that the motivations underlying such cultural connections were deeply strategic, as the next generation of Chinese leaders educated in Germany—such as Zhu and Yu Ta-wei—would later play significant roles in advancing Sino-German economic relations during the Nanjing Government era.

== Pre-World War II career (1922–1937) ==
In the spring of 1924, Zhu returned to Peking University, where he chaired the Department of German and lectured on introductory geology. In February 1925, while Sun Yat-sen was gravely ill in Beijing, Zhu visited him at Peking Union Medical College Hospital, where he was introduced to Dai Jitao by Zhang Jingjiang. The three, all natives of Wuxing, established a close acquaintance. Soon afterward, Zhu became increasingly active in student movements, leading demonstrations in support of the May Thirtieth Movement, tariff autonomy, and opposition to the warlord Duan Qirui.

Following the March 18 Massacre in 1926, Zhu was placed on a wanted list by the Beiyang government for his participation in anti-government protests. Disguised, he fled to Guangzhou, where he was appointed professor at Sun Yat-sen University. In October, the Nationalist Government in Guangzhou named Dai Jitao and Ku Meng-yu as chairman and vice-chairman of the university council, with Xu Qian, Ding Weifen, and Zhu as members. As the other councilors were frequently occupied with governmental duties, Zhu effectively oversaw much of the university’s administrative work, recruiting prominent intellectuals such as Lu Xun, Fu Sinian, and Gu Jiegang to the faculty.

Later that year, as the Northern Expedition advanced and the National Revolutionary Army under Chiang Kai-shek relocated its headquarters from Guangzhou to Wuhan, Zhu was appointed Secretary-General of the Guangdong Branch of the Kuomintang, whose chairman was Li Jishen. Around this time, Zhu corresponded with his friend Conrad Matschoss to recommend German specialists for the Guangzhou Arsenal. Through Matschoss, he was introduced to General Erich Ludendorff, who in turn referred Colonel Max Bauer to prepare a comprehensive modernization proposal for the Chinese Army, delivered to Zhu through his nephew. With Dai Jitao’s endorsement, Zhu facilitated Bauer’s appointment as a military adviser, marking the beginning of his role as principal liaison between the Kuomintang and Germany.

In April 1927, following Chiang Kai-shek’s purge of the Communists from the Kuomintang (the "Shanghai Massacre"), the First United Front between China and the Soviet Union effectively collapsed. Chiang subsequently turned to Germany as a new model for political and military modernization, elevating pro-German figures such as Dai Jitao, Zhang Jingjiang, and Zhu to positions of influence. In May 1927, Sun Yat-sen University abolished its council-based administrative system, appointing Dai as president and Zhu as vice president. That October, Zhu concurrently assumed office as Director of Civil Affairs in the Zhejiang Provincial Government. During his tenure, he focused on talent cultivation and administrative reform, establishing the province’s first examination for county magistrates, founding the Zhejiang Police Academy and the School of Local Self-Government, and creating the Zhejiang Provincial Institute of Public Health.

In 1929, following the death of German military adviser Max Bauer in Shanghai, Zhu sought to invite Erich Ludendorff to China, but restrictions imposed by the Treaty of Versailles prevented his participation. Instead, Zhu recommended General Georg Wetzell as an alternative. In September 1930, Dai Jitao resigned as president of Sun Yat-sen University and nominated Zhu as his successor. Zhu consequently stepped down from his Zhejiang post and returned to Guangzhou to assume the presidency. By December, he was transferred to Nanjing to serve as president of National Central University.

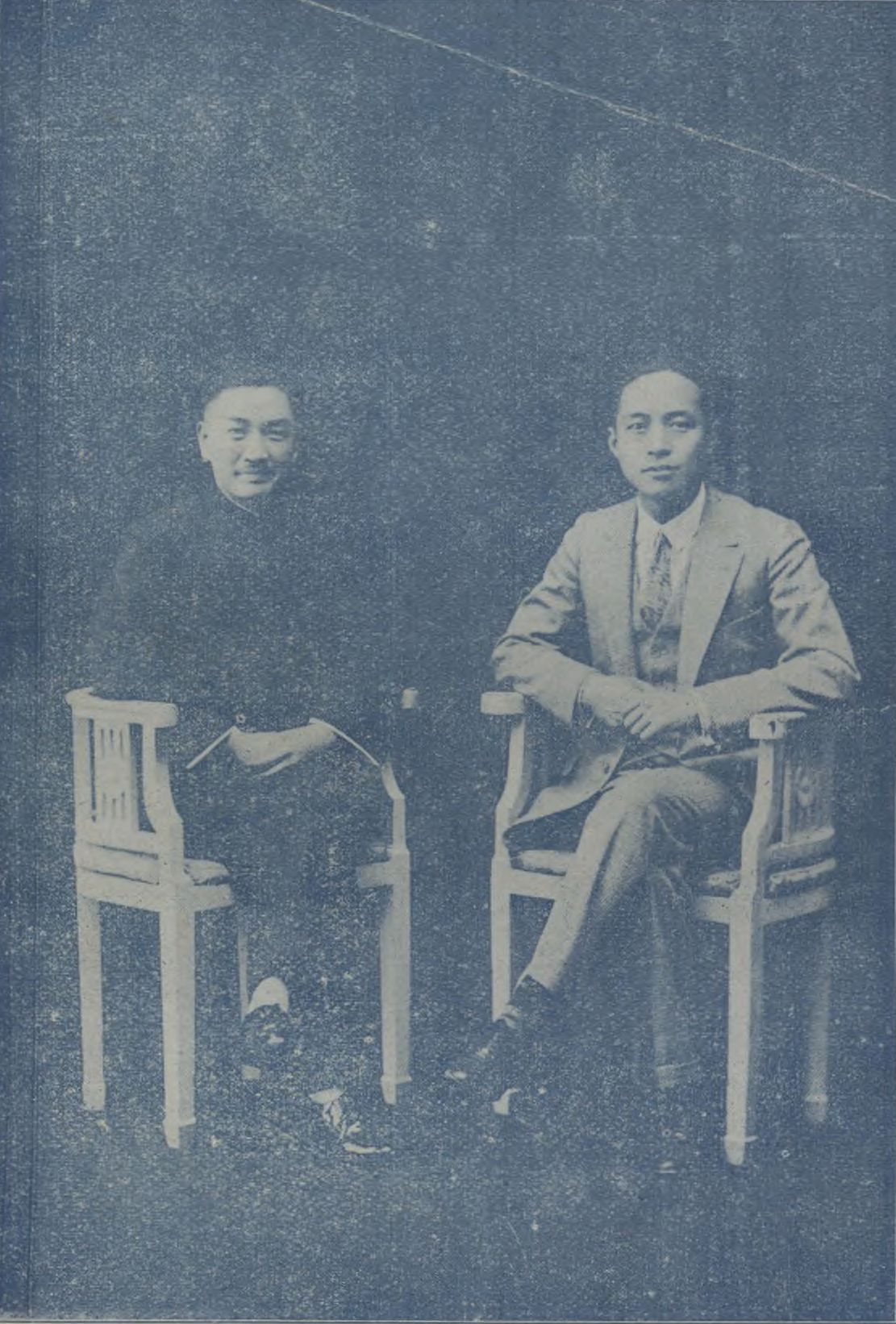
Zhu and Dai Jitao, 1931

In February 1931, Chiang Kai-shek’s decision to place Legislative Yuan President Hu Hanmin under house arrest provoked widespread dissent within the Kuomintang, leading to a split between the two governments of Nanjing and Canton, with additional opposition from the Hu's and Sun Fo's faction. The internal crisis deepened in September 1931, when Japan invaded Manchuria, triggering nationwide outrage and mounting calls for Chiang’s resignation to restore party unity and address the Japanese threat. Under intense political and public pressure, Chiang announced his resignation as premier on 15 December 1931, and Sun Fo subsequently formed a new cabinet.

During Sun’s premiership, Zhu was invited to serve as Minister of Education. Before accepting the post, he sent a telegram to Chiang, seeking his opinion. Chiang replied: “As for Chia-hua’s appointment, I have no objection; however, without a clear national policy and the central government’s full support, your effort will be in vain—a pity indeed.” Taking this as tacit discouragement, Zhu declined to assume the position (though he remained nominally listed as minister) and resigned his concurrent post as president of National Central University, citing the need to avoid student activism.

With Chiang’s later approval in 1932, Zhu formally took office as Minister of Education. His tenure was marked by efforts to standardize and reform the national education system, with particular emphasis on expanding compulsory, primary, and secondary education. He sought to correct the academic imbalance between liberal arts and applied sciences, noting that “in 1930, there were 17,000 students in the humanities and law, while those in agriculture, engineering, medicine, and the sciences combined numbered only about 8,000—less than half.” In his policy statement, A Nine-Month Overview of the Ministry of Education’s National Educational Reforms (25 November 1932), Zhu outlined his program: to restrain the proliferation of humanities and law departments while strengthening practical and scientific education across the country.

Chiang Kai-shek, however, grew dissatisfied with Zhu’s emphasis on scientific and technical education at the expense of the humanities. In his diary entry of 7 September 1932, Chiang wrote, “Discussed educational issues with Liu Xian (Zhu's courtesy name) . In my view, the salvation of the nation lies only in the revival of national character and the cultivation of the teachings of Confucius, Mencius, Lu Xiangshan, and Wang Yangming; thus, one must begin by rectifying the human heart. Subsequently, Zhu was appointed Minister of Transportation and Communications in October 1932 and relinquished his position as Minister of Education in April 1933.

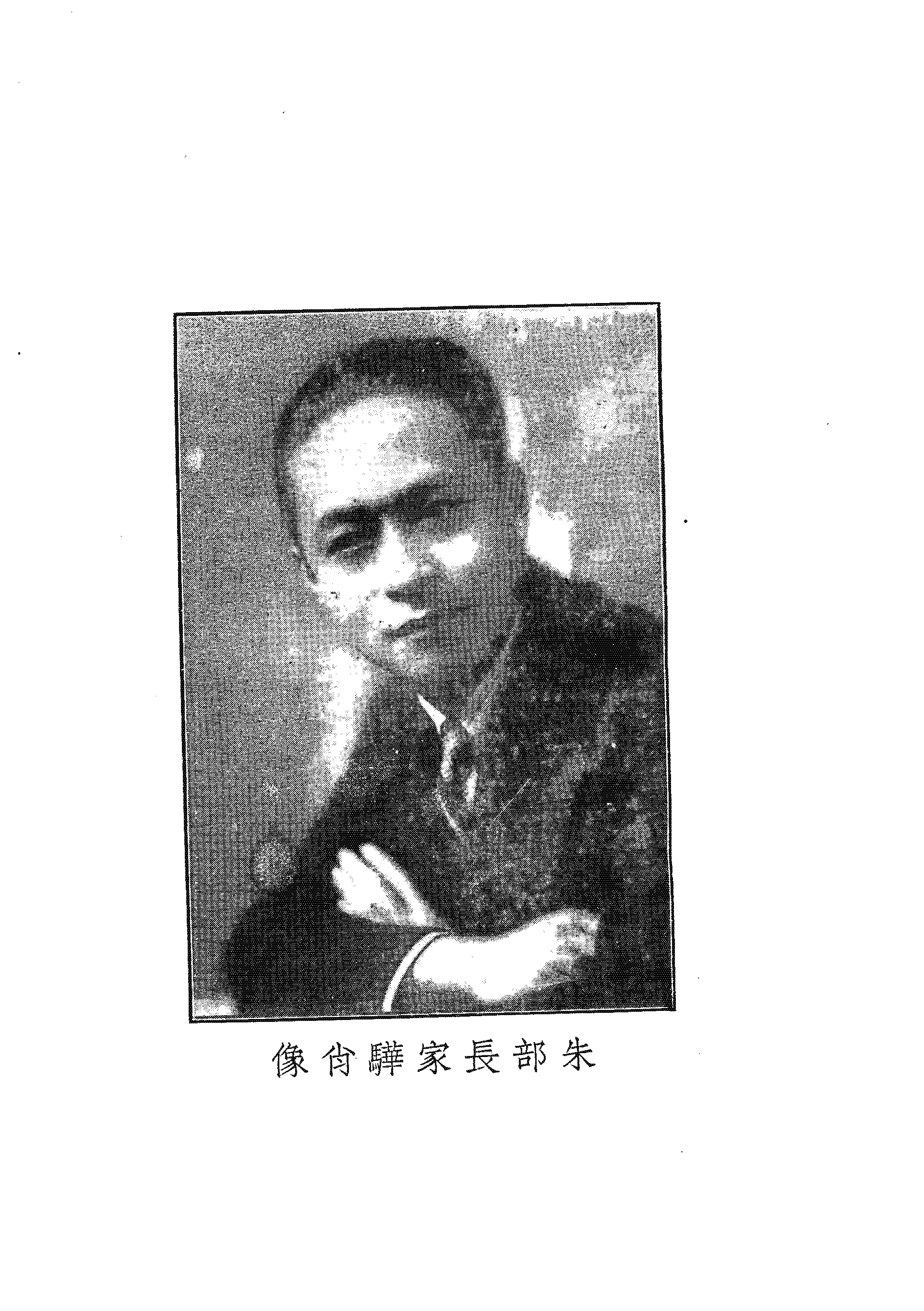
Zhu's official portrait as Minister of Transportation and Communications, 1934

At the time, Zhu, as a Chiangist, served as Minister of Transportation and Communications, while Ku Meng-yu, as a Wangist, held the post of Minister of Railways. Zhu simultaneously chaired the Sino-British Boxer Indemnity Board, which controlled a significant portion of the funding for railway construction, allowing him to exert influence over rail policy and counterbalance Wang’s network within the government.

During his tenure at the Ministry of Transportation and Communications, Zhu continued to advance pro-German initiatives, purchasing aircraft from Germany and dispatching Chinese personnel for training there. He also maintained responsibility for Sino-German coordination, inviting General Hans von Seeckt to visit China and personally presiding over the official welcoming ceremony while serving as interpreter between Seeckt and Chiang Kai-shek. In the mid-1930s, Zhu established the Chinese Academic Friendship Association (中國學院聯誼會) and the Sino-German Cultural and Economic Association, serving as president of both organizations.

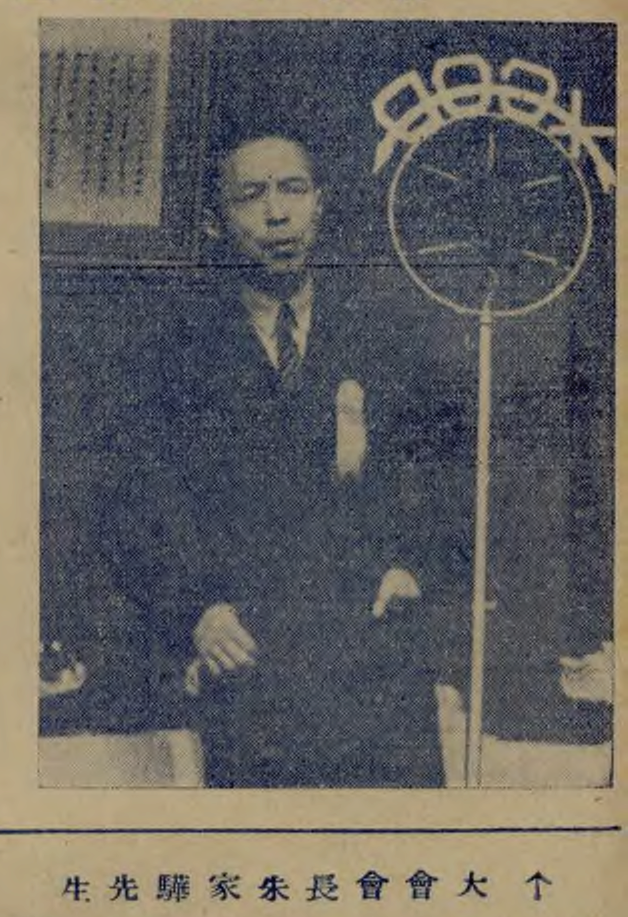
Governor Zhu presided over the 5th Zhejiang Provincial Games, 1937

In December 1936, Zhu was appointed Governor of Zhejiang Province. The following year, with the outbreak of the Second Sino-Japanese War, he was replaced by General Huang Shaohong, as the provincial administration came under military command. Zhu subsequently followed the Nationalist government’s retreat first to Wuhan and later to Chongqing, serving as a close aide to Chiang Kai-shek during this period.

== World War II career (1937–1945) ==
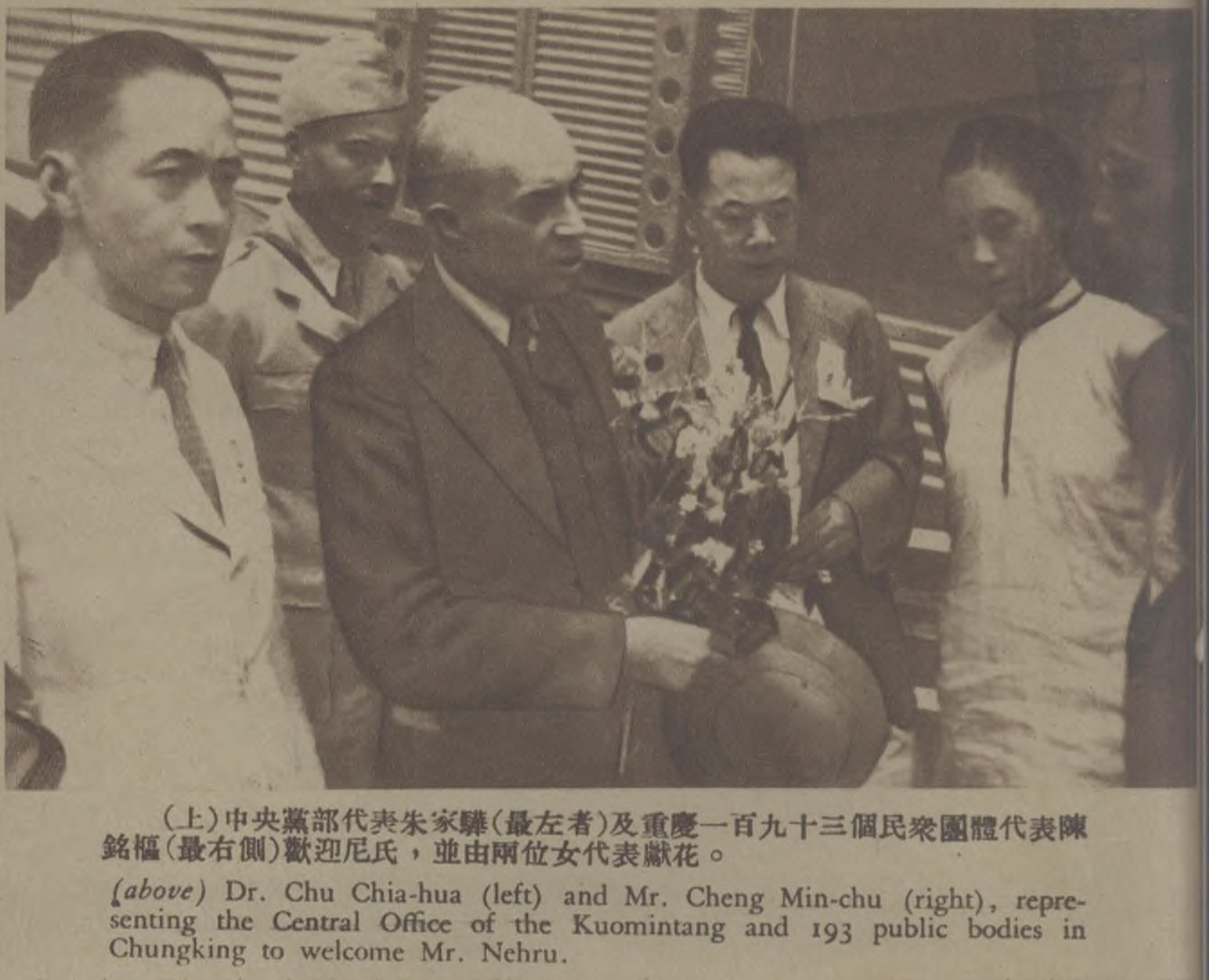
The Secretary-General of the Kuomintang, Zhu, and Chen Mingshu, welcomed Jawaharlal Nehru, then a leader of the Indian National Congress, 1939.

From April 1938 to November 1939, Zhu served as Secretary-General of the Kuomintang (KMT). Concurrently, from June 1938 to May 1944, he headed the Central Bureau of Investigation and Statistics (CBIS), the party’s principal intelligence organ, from July 1938 to August 1939, he acted as Secretary-General of the Three Principles of the People Youth Corps, and from November 1939 to May 1944, he headed Organization Department. His appointments during this period reflected Chiang Kai-shek’s broader effort to professionalize and “academize” the party apparatus by elevating technocrats and intellectuals who were not aligned with either the CC Clique or the Whampoa Clique.

Although Zhu was sometimes treated as a figure of similar stature to the Chen brothers within the CC Clique rather than as their subordinate, he had neither an established power base nor prior administrative experience within the KMT’s internal hierarchy. As a result, his early tenure at the Central Committee was marked by resistance from subordinates. According to diary entries by Chen Ke-wen and Chen Bulei in June 1938, Zhu was reportedly humiliated and even physically assaulted by Committee staff, leading him to contemplate resignation.

As the new rootless head of the bureau, Zhu became embroiled in a power struggle with deputy director Xu Enzeng, who was backed by the Chen brothers. The conflict centered on control of the bureau and the broader intelligence apparatus of the KMT. During this period, Zhu aligned himself with the Three Principles of the People Youth Corps, the Reorganization Group and politician Ding Weifen and brought under his influence the anti-Japanese underground leader from Northeast China, Lo Ta-yu, to counter the influence of the CC Clique within the party.

After succeeding the Chen brothers as the KMT’s chief party administrator, Zhu quickly moved to consolidate his position within the party apparatus. To mitigate the disadvantage of lacking a factional base, he assembled a circle of protégés and associates—many drawn from academia and the civil service—and integrated them into the party bureaucracy. Upon his transfer to head the Central Organization Department, Zhu established a Personnel Office responsible for registering and dispatching qualified candidates to provincial party branches. The first director of the office was Yu Shuping, an early graduate of the Zhejiang Provincial Police Academy founded by Zhu, who had later studied law in Austria under Zhu’s sponsorship. Yu was succeeded by Wan Shaozhang, a graduate of both Sun Yat-sen University and National Central University who had served in the Ministries of Communications and Education, followed in 1943 by Chen Shaoxian, another of Zhu’s former subordinates.

Most senior staff within the Organization Department were replaced by Zhu’s protégés or German-educated personnel. Chief Secretary Wang Qijiang, for instance, held a degree from an Austrian university but was formerly associated with Ye Chucang. Two secretaries, Pang Jingtang and Wang Peiren, were former CC Clique members; according to Pang’s later recollections, both had been instructed by Zhang Lisheng to resign prior to Zhu’s appointment, but Zhu rebuked the order and retained them, effectively bringing them into his camp. Director of Party Affairs Lu Hanqin had previously served as secretary at National Central University, while Gan Jiaxin had been secretary at Zhejiang University and magistrate of Rui’an County. Tian Peilin, who held a doctorate in philosophy from the University of Berlin, was also among Zhu’s close academic associates. The only two Director-ranked officials retained from the previous administration were Li Yongxin, head of the Frontier Affairs Section, a Mongolian, and the director of the Military Affairs Section, a major general.

This sweeping personnel overhaul provoked discontent among the Chen brothers, Zhang Lisheng, and numerous displaced officials. The newly appointed staff, many of whom lacked prior experience in party administration, struggled with bureaucratic inefficiency and poor coordination. The Political Science Clique (政學系) figure Xiong Shihui later criticized the situation in his memoirs, recounting that when he asked Lu Hanqin to explain the distinction between party and governmental functions, Lu was unable to give a coherent answer. Wang Zizhuang, one of those ousted by Zhu, remarked that “in the web of personal relations that defines Chinese officialdom, one cannot survive without a steadfast focus on matters rather than men,” though he also acknowledged that Zhu “labored day and night without weariness, revealing where his true passion lay.”

Following the outbreak of the Second World War in Europe in 1939, Zhu, along with Zhang Qun, Wang Chonghui, and H. H. Kung, argued that China should maintain a position of neutrality in the European conflict.

In April 1939, Zhu, together with Dai Li, hosted a banquet in Chongqing for the German arms dealer Hans Klien, who was known for his extensive involvement in Germany’s munitions industry.

In 1940, Zhu sent a congratulatory message to German Field Marshal Wilhelm Keitel, praising Germany’s “victories” in Europe and urging the German government to use its influence to restore peace on the continent while refocusing its attention on East Asia. Zhu believed that Japan could never defeat China and was of no real strategic value to Germany. He suggested that the time had come for Germany to reengage diplomatically in China to secure its postwar interests. In his correspondence to Keitel, Zhu wrote that “the postwar reconstruction of the Nationalist government will rely greatly on your country, and China’s revival, in every respect, will in turn contribute to your nation’s prosperity.”

In early June 1940, Zhu presided over the founding ceremony of the Sino-German Cultural and Economic Association, where both Chinese and German representatives delivered speeches and adopted a joint declaration. Zhu’s address and the full text of the declaration were published in the Central Daily News on 9 June, and simultaneously reported by the Central News Agency and reprinted in the Ta Kung Pao.The event drew criticism from some senior officials. Wang Shijie remarked that “Zhu Liuxian and others, by convening a Sino-German Cultural Association at this juncture to advocate for Germany, acted with regrettable naivety.”

Two days later, on 11 June, Under Chiang and Zhu's permission, the Central Daily News ran an editorial titled “Reading the Sino-German Association’s Declaration,” expressing cautious optimism for future Sino-German relations: “Germany was once a world power, and its future position in global culture and politics remains incalculable. The war in the Far East has lasted nearly three years; its purpose is the restoration of China’s territory and independence. From a cultural standpoint, the German people and their leaders, guided by their intellectual tradition, may well reconsider their Far Eastern policy. A strong and independent China, whether culturally, economically, or politically, would bring Germany a hundred benefits and not a single harm.”

According to Wang Tzu-chuang, then Secretary-General of the KMT Central Supervisory Committee, Zhu’s initiative was intended to draw German attention to East Asia and to encourage Berlin to restrain Japan’s aggression.

Zhu became acting president of Academia Sinica upon the death of Cai Yuanpei in 1940, and was responsible for organizing the relocation of its institutes from China to Taiwan during the Chinese Civil War and a period of low monetary funds. Zhu repurposed funds originally set aside for Chinese students to study abroad. Although the Kuomintang government agreed with Zhu's actions when he first proposed them, Chiang Kai-shek later withdrew his approval and Zhu resigned as president of the Academia Sinica in 1957.

At the outset of Zhu’s tenure as Minister of Organization, his two deputies were Ma Chaochun and Wu Kaixian. When Wu was arrested in Shanghai in 1942 while conducting operations behind enemy lines, the deputy ministerial position became vacant. Zhu recommended his former colleague He Siyuan, who had served as professor of economics and librarian at Sun Yat-sen University during Zhu’s presidency, as Wu’s replacement. However, Chen Guofu supported the appointment of Zhang Qiang of the CC Clique. The dispute culminated in Zhang’s selection, marking a notable victory for the CC Clique over Zhu’s growing influence within the party hierarchy.

On 7 November 1943, to commemorate the abolition of the extraterritorial rights and unequal treaties held by Britain and the United States in China, Zhu organized an elaborate ceremony through the Central Organization Department and the Party’s Industrial and Mining Branch. Over five hundred members participated in presenting a set of Nine Tripod Cauldrons to Chiang Kai-shek, an ancient symbol of supreme imperial authority dating back to the Xia dynasty, meant to extol Chiang’s leadership in what was styled as a grandly ritualistic tribute. However, the event had the opposite effect. Upon learning during the ceremony that the cauldrons had cost two million yuan and taken more than a year to complete, Chiang reportedly flew into a rage and publicly rebuked Zhu. In his diary that evening, Chiang wrote:

Such wasteful expenditure of time and money is of no benefit to the Party or the nation’s war effort. To hold such a vain and extravagant ceremony amidst national hardship and wartime suffering is utterly senseless. This folly reflects the ignorance of Zhu Jiahua, who behaves as a sycophantic bureaucrat devoid of principle. I reprimanded him severely and ordered the matter canceled. Only the opening ceremony of the Party training class was permitted to proceed, and I took the occasion to instruct the attendees on the need for practicality and moral discipline rather than empty formalities.

The incident was widely regarded as the beginning of Zhu’s political decline. Senior officials noted it in their private writings: Chen Bulei recorded that today the Industrial and Mining Party School offered the Nine Tripods, but the Generalissimo refused, deeming it untimely and inappropriate., while Tang Cheung observed that many praised the Chairman’s sagacity. Chen Kewen cited Chen Cheng’s reaction: This act carries monarchic overtones—did they not foresee that perception, or was it his intention? The ailing Chen Guofu remarked that under such circumstances, leadership within the Organization Department appears deeply problematic., to which Zheng Yitong replied, Fortunately, the Generalissimo remains untouched by feudal sentiment; the Republic can yet be regarded with optimism.

In May 1944, Zhu resigned as director of the CBIS—succeeded by CC Clique member Ye Xiufeng—and concurrently relinquished his position as head of the Central Organization Department, which was subsequently reoccupied by Chen Guofu. He was appointed Minister of Education in November of the same year. Zhu’s confidant Yu Shuping wrote to him on 29 May 1944: Personnel reshuffles within the Party are commonplace and unremarkable. Today’s reinstated minister of organization was once removed in similar fashion. What truly matters is not one’s title but one’s capacity for effective action. Yu analyzed that the CC Clique’s victory stemmed from its organizational cohesion, urging Zhu to use Academia Sinica as a base for diplomatic and academic engagement, strengthening ties with British and American institutions.

Similarly, another Zhu'ist Wang Wenjun (王文俊), executive committee member of the Qinghai Provincial Party Department, cautioned Zhu in a letter dated 18 September 1944: The education system under Lifu has fallen into such disorder that reform is imperative, though it will inevitably provoke personnel conflicts. Six years of toil in party affairs have ended in defeat. Should you now attempt to restore education to its proper path, you risk hardship without benefit to the nation or the leader. What the Party truly needs is unity of purpose and support for the Generalissimo—not factional rivalry or personal ambition, which only isolates him and weakens his trust. Better to rest for now and earn public respect; one day, when the Chairman perceives the shortage of capable men around him, you will again be called upon in service to both the nation and the leader.

Upon stepping down, Zhu submitted to Chiang a comprehensive report summarizing his six years in charge of party affairs, emphasizing eight major accomplishments:

1. Reorganization of party branches at provincial, county, and district levels, with higher standards for executives and secretaries.
2. Establishment of industrial, mining, and rural training programs for party cadres;
3. Founding of party branches in educational institutions to strengthen ties with academia.
4. Development of wartime party administration, though with limited success in occupied territories.
5. Systematic cultivation of party personnel, with emphasis on intellectual and technical competence.
6. Implementation of internal party elections, completed in roughly half of all counties.
7. Preparations for constitutional government through enhanced party leadership in local councils.
8. Expansion of military and frontier party work, focusing respectively on ideological and literacy training, minority policy, social welfare, and public health.

After Zhu’s departure and Chen’s return, a popular political quip circulated in Chongqing: “To sacrifice Pig (Zhu) in order to worship Confucius (Kung) ”—a pun referring to Zhu Jiahua’s removal and the concurrent rise of H. H. Kung.

== Post-World War II career (1945–1957) ==
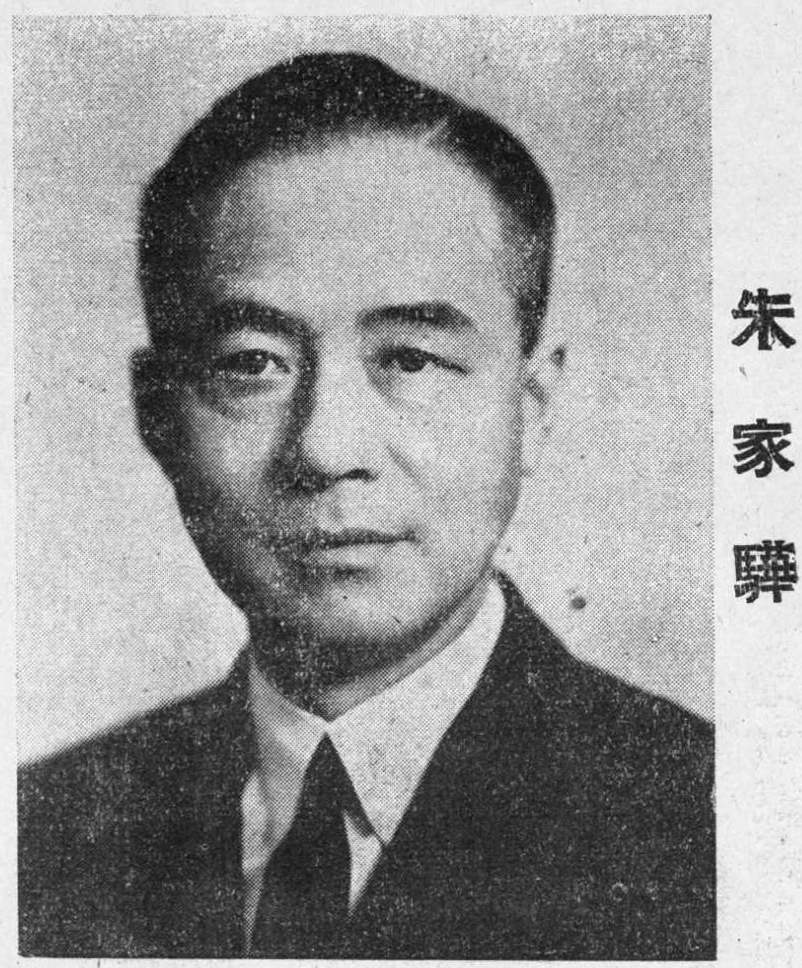
Zhu, 1948

Following Japan’s surrender in August 1945, Zhu—who had by then fully withdrawn from intra-party affairs—resumed his administrative career and continued to serve as Minister of Education. In the immediate aftermath of the war, he issued broadcast directives to educational authorities in the recovered territories, instructing them to maintain institutional stability until Nationalist officials arrived to take over administration. The Ministry simultaneously promulgated a fourteen-item “Emergency Program for Educational Repatriation in the War Zones,” to be implemented by provincial and municipal governments. To facilitate the transition, Zhu established regional Educational Repatriation and Guidance Committees tasked with supervising postwar restoration and coordinating with local governments.

On 20 September, the Ministry convened a National Conference on Educational Repatriation. Zhu outlined four priorities:

1. To use the opportunity of institutional repatriation to achieve a more balanced geographic distribution of schools nationwide
2. To purge the “enslaving” curriculum and administrative practices introduced under Japanese and collaborationist regimes, and to restore prewar academic standards;
3. To ensure that wartime faculty relocated from coastal or riverine regions could continue their work without disruption
4. To provide assistance and pathways for the large number of youth who had participated in wartime service or whose education had been interrupted by the conflict.

The Ministry also adopted detailed measures concerning university-level institutions and research institutes, emphasizing a rational redistribution of campuses based on population density, transportation networks, and regional economic conditions. For students in formerly occupied territories, Zhu authorized accelerated remedial programs; those who passed examinations were admitted to regular schools, while graduates could obtain Ministry-recognized diplomas upon submitting a thesis or research report that met departmental standards.

By late November, acting on the resolutions of the national repatriation conference, Zhu sought to implement a comprehensive postwar reorganization of China’s university system. Several wartime institutions—such as the Chongqing Industrial College, Jiangjin Women’s Normal College, the Northwest Institute of Technology in Hanzhong, Beiyang University in Xi’an, and the National Northwest Normal College in Lanzhou—were to remain in situ to foster regional educational development. However, many universities prepared to return to prewar locations in Beijing, Tianjin, Nanjing, and Shanghai, triggering student unrest across several cities. Major demonstrations soon erupted in Kunming and other postwar centers, reflecting broader tensions over campus relocation, resource allocation, and political uncertainty.

In July 1946, Zhu, together with physicist Wu Ta-You, linguist Chao Yuen Ren, and chemist Chou Pei-yuan, traveled to London as Education Ministry delegates to attend the Royal Society’s tricentennial commemoration of Sir Isaac Newton.

In December 1948, Zhu stepped down as Minister of Education and was appointed Minister without Portfolio. Following Chiang Kai-shek’s temporary retirement in January 1949 and the assumption of the acting presidency by Li Zongren, the National Government attempted to negotiate a ceasefire with the Chinese Communist Party. Zhu delivered a series of speeches sharply criticizing the initiative. In June 1949, he was appointed Vice President of the Executive Yuan (Deputy Premier), a position he held until March 1950. After the establishment of the Federal Republic of Germany in August 1949, Zhu publicly urged the Nationalist government to establish diplomatic ties without delay.

Zhu also remained active in international cultural and educational diplomacy. As early as September 1945, he had served as China’s chief delegate to the Conference for the Establishment of the United Nations Educational and Cultural Organization. When UNESCO was formally founded in November 1946, Zhu became acting head of the Chinese delegation. On 12 April 1947, as Minister of Education, he presided over the first preparatory session of the Chinese National Commission for UNESCO, which was scheduled to be inaugurated at Nanjing in June.

== Later years and death (1957–1963) ==
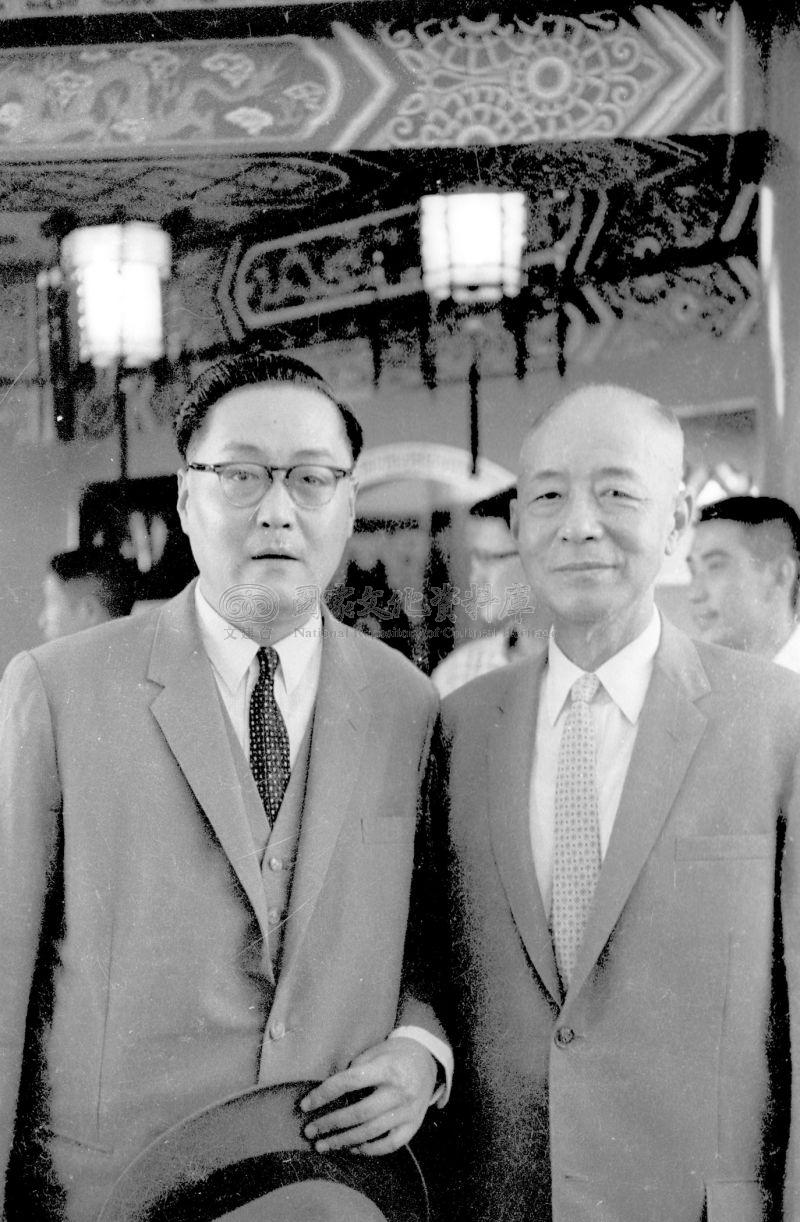
Zhu, with Kung Te-cheng in 1958

Beginning in 1953, Zhu’s health deteriorated due to duodenal bleeding, pyloric obstruction, and chronic gastric illness, prompting him to withdraw gradually from public life. By 1961, worsening insomnia further undermined his health, and he was admitted to hospital for evaluation. Physicians reported mild cardiac enlargement and arteriosclerosis—findings typical of old age. After three weeks of treatment his insomnia improved, though he continued to feel physically unsteady.

In July 1962, Zhu confided to Provincial Education Department director Fang Zhimao:

“I did not expect my strength to fail so quickly. It may be impossible to recover. If I could have ten more years, I would hope to see three things: the recovery of the mainland, mankind landing on the Moon, and greater achievements in our academic and educational circles. That would be enough for me.”

By September, examinations indicated that accelerated cerebral arteriosclerosis was aggravating his cardiac condition. On 3 January 1963, Zhu suffered a fatal heart attack during routine physical therapy. He was 69.

A memorial committee was convened at 11 a.m. the following day, attended by 323 figures including Yu Youren, Li Shih-hui, Wang Yun-wu, and Yen Chia-kan. The committee selected General Ho Ying-chin as chairman, with Wang Shijie, Zhang Dao, Cheng Tien-fong, Huang Jilu, Ku Zhenggang, Tang Zong, Ni Wen-ya, Chen Xueping, and Zhu Shui as vice-chairmen. Xu Boyuan was appointed secretary-general, with Teng Chuankai, Zhang Shouxian, Niu Chu, Yu Shuping, and Fang Zhimao serving as deputy secretaries-general. Zhu received a state funeral on 9 January.

Following his death, Academia Sinica began hosting a lecture series in Zhu's honor.

== Legacy ==
Although Zhu Jiahua had died in 1963, his political network continued to exert influence within the Kuomintang’s legislative and party structures for years thereafter. According to Chao Tze-chi, then party caucus leader, during the process of forming Sun Yun-suan’s cabinet in May 1978, the faction historically associated with Zhu was among the key internal alignments considered in coordinating legislative support. Chao recounted that prior to Sun’s confirmation, he assisted in meetings with over 440 legislators, noting the existence of multiple caucuses and groups within the legislature, including the CC Clique, Tsotanhui Clique, Monday-Thursday Tsotanhui, Zhong She, Zhi-Ren-Yong, and the network linked to Zhu Jiahua, as well as the Youth Party, Democratic Socialist Party, and unaffiliated legislatorsl. According to Chao, the Zhu Jiahua Clique was split from Tsotanhui Clique.

== Scholarly assessment ==
According to Dr. Liang Xinlei, Assistant Research Fellow at the Institute of Modern History, Chinese Academy of Social Sciences, Zhu Jiahua’s ability to challenge the CC Clique and form his own political faction — sometimes referred to as the "Zhu Jiahua Clique" — stemmed from Chiang Kai-shek’s personal support, Zhu’s scholarly background, and his regional advantages within the party apparatus. However, Liang notes that Zhu’s administrative and personnel management skills were far removed from his academic expertise.

In order to build his own faction and counterbalance rival cliques, Zhu became increasingly absorbed in intra-party struggles. This, Liang argues, ultimately obscured the Kuomintang's original goal in appointing Zhu to pursue institutional reform and organizational integrity. Zhu’s growing fixation on power struggle ultimately led to the failure of his political faction.

Scholars have noted that the so-called "Zhu Jiahua Clique" within the Kuomintang remains one of the least clearly defined factions in the party’s modern history. Professor Wang Liangqing of Jinan University observes that Zhu’s followers were loosely recorded, rendering his political faction obscure and difficult to delineate.

Liang Xinlei further notes that contemporaries sometimes referred to Zhu’s circle as the “New CC Clique” or “New Cadre Clique.” However, due to the scarcity of primary sources and the lack of sustained scholarly inquiry, the precise composition, ideology, and influence of the Zhu Jiahua faction remain ambiguous. As a result, the nature of Zhu’s interactions—whether cooperative or competitive—with other factions such as the CC Clique, the Whampoa Clique, the Political Science Clique, and various regional power blocs continues to be a subject of historical uncertainty.

== See also ==
- List of vice premiers of the Republic of China
