= Kang Tse =

Chinese general and politician (1904–1967)

- 康澤
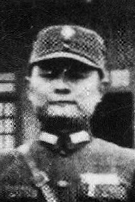
- Born: July 8, 1904
- Died: December 23, 1967 (aged 63)
- Occupations: General, Politician
- Organization: Chinese People's Political Consultative Conference
- Political party: Kuomintang

Kang Tse (Chinese: 康澤; July 8, 1904 – December 23, 1967) was a Chinese general and politician. He was a co-founder of Blue Shirt Society, Three Principles of the People Youth Corps and Tsotanhui Clique within the Kuomintang. Kang played a significant role in intelligence operations, attempting to establish a spy network in China modeled after the State Political Directorate.

In 1928, Kang Tse graduated from the Moscow Sun Yat-sen University. Although trained in the Soviet system, he did not subscribe to Marxism-Leninism. Instead, he advised Chiang Kai-shek to adopt the Soviet-style State Political Directorate model to consolidate power. Acting on this recommendation, Chiang in 1931 formed the Nanchang Special Task Force Unit (Chinese: 南昌行營別動總隊), composed mainly of unemployed graduates from the Whampoa Military Academy. Kang was appointed commander of the unit and became a trusted figure during the anti-Communist campaigns in Jiangxi. During the encirclement campaigns against the Chinese Red Army, Kang's special task force operated with high intensity in former Communist base areas, directing local authorities to carry out suppression operations and restore Kuomintang administrative control. When the Red Army embarked on the Long March, Chiang dispatched Xue Yue and the Central Army to pursue them across Sichuan, Yunnan, and Guizhou. In each county along the route, Kang's units were deployed to monitor Communist elements and suspected sympathizers. Kang Tse also played a key role in the founding of both the Blue Shirts Society and the Three Principles of the People Youth Corps, which became influential paramilitary and ideological organizations aligned with Chiang's regime.

Kang emerged as one of the core administrator of the Three Principles of the People Youth Corps when he assumed the position of acting head of the Organization Department in 1938. Although Chiang Kai-shek’s institutional blueprint nominally placed Secretary-General Chen Cheng above him, Kang exercised operational control over cadre assignments and daily organizational work. The resulting confrontational tension between Kang and Chen prompted Chiang to appoint Zhu Jiahua—a figure personally close to Kang—as acting secretary-general of the Corps in an attempt to stabilize internal factional rivalries.

After assuming office, Zhu reorganized the existing seven departments into three, a restructuring that in practice strengthened the authority of Kang as acting minister of organization. In return, Kang actively promoted personnel aligned with Zhu and cooperated with him in boycotting the influence of the CC Clique.

In 1947, he was elected as a member of the Legislative Yuan. Since Chen Cheng was not a legislator, Kang Tse became the de facto leader of the Tsotanhui Clique within the Legislative Yuan. In 1948, he was captured by the Chinese Communist Party. After being granted amnesty in 1963, he served as a cultural and historical specialist for the Chinese People's Political Consultative Conference.

Kang Tse authored several memoirs and reflective writings, including The Origins of the Fuxing Society, The Establishment of the Three Principles of the People Youth League, and My Role in the Negotiations of the Second KMT-CCP Cooperation.
