= Wang Zuanxu =

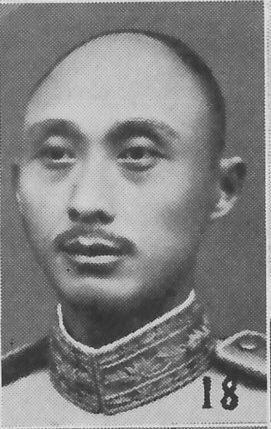
- Wang Zuanxu (Wang Tsuan-hsu) as pictured in The Most Recent Biographies of Chinese Dignitaries
- Born: June 2, 1885 Nanchong, Sichuan, Qing dynasty
- Died: November 1960 (aged 75)
- Allegiance: Republic of China
- Branch: National Revolutionary Army
- Conflicts: Second Sino-Japanese War; Battle of West Hubei

Wang Zuanxu (Chinese: 王纘緒; June 2, 1885 – November 1960) was a Kuomintang general from Sichuan.

== Biography ==
After the founding of the Republic of China, Wang Zuanxu continued to be promoted within the Sichuan Army. In the National Defense War in December 1915 (the 4th year of the Republic of China), he participated in the war as a subordinate of Liu Xiang on the side of the Beijing government. In April 1918 (the seventh year of the Republic of China), he served as the commander of the Eighth Regiment of the Second Division of the Sichuan Army under Liu Xiang. (Note: 《西充县人民政府志》记其1918年任四川陆军第一师军官传习所所长，1919年调任第二师第六团团长。) In March 1920 (9th year of the Republic of China), during the Sichuan-Yunnan War, Liu Xiang assigned Wang Zuanxu's regiment to Yang Sen. In May, Wang Zuanxu was promoted to the 18th Brigade Commander of the Second Division of the Sichuan Army, and concurrently served as the South Sichuan Road Yin. During his tenure in South Sichuan Province, he "developed farmland, water conservancy, built roads, improved prisons, and rewarded overseas students." He appointed Lu Zuofu as the chief of the Third Section (Education) of the South Sichuan Province Office. He also founded the Popular Education Association and reformed He went to the Southern Sichuan Normal School, invited Yun Daiying to teach there, and published books such as "Introduction to Political Science" compiled by Yun Daiying.

In 1925 (the 14th year of the Republic of China), Yang Sen launched the battle to unify Sichuan. Wang Zuanxu was appointed commander of the 1st Division and commander-in-chief of the North Road, and launched an attack on Hechuan and Chongqing from Suining. The generals of the divisions in eastern Sichuan formed an anti-Yang coalition in Chongqing. They used Deng Xihou's troops to block Wang Zuanxu's troops in Hechuan, and Tian Songyao's troops flanked Suining to contain Wang Zuanxu's troops. Wang Zuanxu was dissatisfied with Yang Sen's monopoly of power. Liu Xiang used the commander of the 16th Division and the Sichuan Salt Transport Envoy to seduce Wang Zuanxu in an attempt to make Wang Zuanxu defect from Yang Sen. In late July of the same year, Wang Zuanxu sent a message to the armies of both sides in Suining, advocating a ceasefire to negotiate the situation in Sichuan. As a result, Yang Sen's department was shaken across the board and ultimately failed. Thereafter, Wang Zuanxu served as the commander of the 16th Division (appointed on September 23 of the same year) and the Sichuan Salt Transport Envoy.

== Second Sino-Japanese War ==
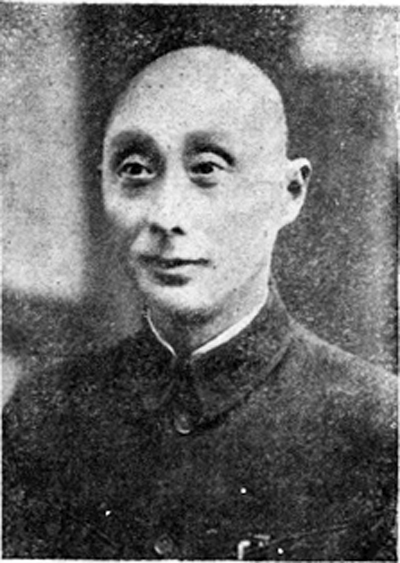

On June 28, 1937, Wang Zuanxu was appointed as a member of the Chuankang Military Reorganization Committee. On September 1 of the same year, Wang Zuanxu led the 44th Army (organized into the 23rd Group Army) to the anti-Japanese front line and concentrated in Yichang to prepare reinforcements along the Beijing-Hankou Railway. In January 1938, the 44th Army was separated from the 23rd Army and combined with the 67th Army to form the 29th Army. Wang Zuanxu was appointed commander-in-chief of the 29th Army. On January 20, 1938, Liu Xiang died of illness in Hankou, and Zhang Qun took over as chairman of Sichuan Provincial Government. On January 23, Wang Zuanxu led the thirty-five generals who stayed in Sichuan to call Chiang Kai-shek, Chairman of the Military Commission of the Nationalist Government, to support the central government's decision on personnel changes; however, on the same day, the commander of the 161st Division Xu Shaozong led 6 troops staying in Sichuan. A division commander and five independent brigade commanders called the central government, requesting to "take back their orders" and organized demonstrations in Chengdu and Chongqing. The situation became tense. Since then, Wang Zuanxu and others were summoned by Chiang Kai-shek many times. On April 26 of the same year, the Executive Yuan meeting decided to appoint Wang Zuanxu as acting chairman of Sichuan Province. On April 27, Wang Zuanxu called Chiang Kai-shek and begged to withdraw his appointment as Acting Chairman of Sichuan Province. Chiang Kai-shek declined on May 3. Wang Zuanxu was telegraphed and took office on May 8. On August 1 of the same year, the 374th meeting of the Executive Yuan appointed Wang Zuanxu as Chairman of the Sichuan Provincial Government.
