= Chen Cheng =

Chinese politician and general (1898–1965)

- 陳誠
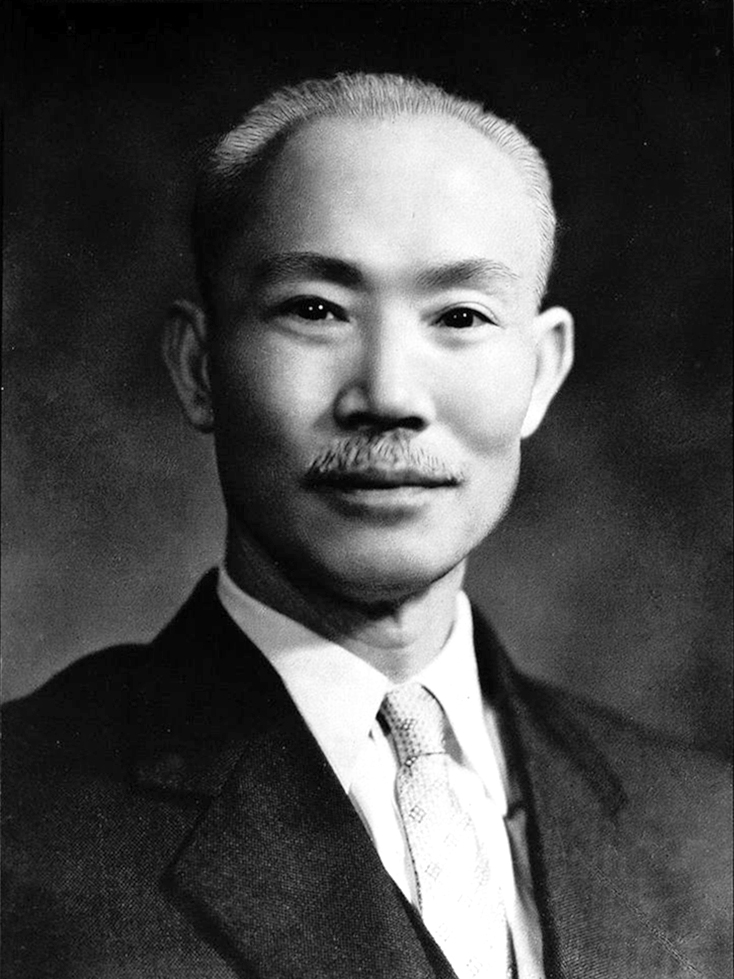
- Official portrait, 1959

2nd Vice President of the Republic of China
- In office 20 May 1954 – 5 March 1965
- President: Chiang Kai-shek
- Preceded by: Li Zongren
- Succeeded by: Yen Chia-kan

2nd and 4th Premier of the Republic of China
- In office 30 June 1958 – 15 December 1963
- President: Chiang Kai-shek
- Vice Premier: Huang Shao-ku; Wang Yun-wu
- Preceded by: Yu Hung-chun
- Succeeded by: Yen Chia-kan
- In office 7 March 1950 – 7 June 1954
- President: Chiang Kai-shek
- Vice Premier: Chang Li-sheng; Huang Shao-ku
- Preceded by: Yan Xishan
- Succeeded by: Yu Hung-chun

2nd Chairman of Taiwan Provincial Government
- In office 5 January 1949 – 21 December 1949
- President: Chiang Kai-shek; Li Zongren (acting); Yan Xishan (acting)
- Preceded by: Wey Daw-ming
- Succeeded by: Wu Kuo-chen

1st Chief of the General Staff of the ROC Armed Forces
- In office 23 March 1946 – 12 May 1948
- President: Chiang Kai-shek
- Preceded by: Position established
- Succeeded by: Gu Zhutong

1st Commander-in-Chief of the ROC Navy
- In office 1 July 1946 – 25 August 1948
- President: Chiang Kai-shek
- Preceded by: Position established
- Succeeded by: Kui Jung-ching

Personal details
- Born: January 4, 1898 Aicun Village, Qingtian, Zhejiang, China
- Died: March 5, 1965 (aged 67) Taipei, Taiwan
- Resting place: Chen Tsyr-shiou Memorial Park, Taipei, later cremated and reinterred in Fo Guang Shan, Kaohsiung
- Party: Kuomintang
- Spouse(s): Wu Shun-lien (m. 1917; div. 1929) Tan Hsiang (m. 1932)
- Relations: Tan Yankai (father-in-law)
- Children: 6, including Chen Li-an
- Occupation: General, politician
- Awards: Order of Blue Sky and White Sun
- Nickname: "Junior Generalissimo"

Military service
- Allegiance: Republic of China
- Branch/service: Republic of China Army
- Years of service: 1924–1950
- Rank: General
- Unit: 11th division
- Commands: 18th Army; 11th Division
- Battles/wars: Northern Expedition Encirclement Campaigns Second Sino-Japanese War: Battle of Shanghai; Battle of Wuhan; First Battle of Changsha; Battle of Zaoyang-Yichang; Battle of West Hubei; South-East Asian theatre of World War II; Burma campaign; Chinese Civil War; Battle of Huaiyin-Huai'an

Chen Cheng ([ʈʂʰə̌n ʈʂʰə̌ŋ]; Chinese: 陳誠; pinyin: Chén Chéng; wugniu (Qingtian dialect): Dzan2-yin2; January 4, 1898 – March 5, 1965), courtesy name Tsi-siou (辭修; Cíxiū), was a Chinese politician, military leader, revolutionary, and the leader of the Tsotanhui Clique. He is widely regarded as the chief architect of Taiwan's post-war land reform and economic modernization programs during the 1950s.

A close protégé of Chiang Kai-shek, Chen rose through the ranks of the National Revolutionary Army and played a major role as a senior commander during the Northern Expedition, the Warlord Era, the Second Sino-Japanese War, and the Chinese Civil War. Following the Kuomintang's retreat to Taiwan, Chen was appointed Governor of Taiwan, during which he declared martial law, and later served as Premier and Vice President. In these roles, he led Taiwan's land redistribution and industrial transformation throughout the 1950s and 1960s, reforms that scholars often identify as key precursors to the Taiwan Miracle. These programs were widely credited with curbing the spread of communism on the island and consolidating public support for the KMT regime.

== Early life ==
Chen Cheng was born in Qingtian County, Zhejiang, to a peasant family as the eldest son among three boys and one girl. He graduated from Baoding Military Academy in 1922, and entered Whampoa Military Academy two years later. It was there that he first met Chiang Kai-shek, Commandant of the Academy. Later, Chen joined National Revolutionary Army to participate in the Northern Expedition.

== Personal life ==
Chen Cheng married Wu Shun-lien (吳舜蓮), the younger sister of his classmate Wu Ziqi, in 1917. In May 1925, while on leave to attend his father’s funeral, Wu reportedly attempted suicide due to suspicions of Chen’s infidelity, but survived. The couple subsequently divorced, though Wu continued to reside at Chen’s family home in Zhejiang. She retreated to Taichung in 1949 and lived with her brother until her death in 1978.

In 1932, through the introduction of Chiang Kai-shek, Chen married Tan Siang (譚祥), daughter of the late Premier Tan Yankai. They had six children, listed here in birth order:

- Chen Hsing (陳幸), who earned a master's degree in mathematics from Columbia University. She married Yu Chuan-tao, a biochemist who later served as Vice Minister of Education and President of National Central University. Yu was also the son of Young China Party co-founder Yu Jiaju.
- Chen Ping (陳平)
- Chen Li-an (陳履安), who obtained a Ph.D. in mathematics from New York University and later served as Minister of Economic Affairs, Minister of National Defense, and President of the Control Yuan, and ran as an independent candidate in the 1996 presidential election.
- Chen Li-ching (陳履慶)
- Chen Li-pei (陳履碚)
- Chen Li-chieh (陳履潔)

Of Chen’s grandchildren, only the eldest son of Chen Hsing and the eldest son of Chen Li-an were born during his lifetime.

== Rise in military ==
During the Northern Expedition, Chen displayed good leadership ability. Within a year, he was promoted from commanding battalions to divisions already.

After the expedition, Chen became active in the wars against the warlords. His successes in the battles allowed him to be promoted again, to the commander of the 18th Army.

== Anticommunist campaigns ==
In 1931, Chen was assigned the task of suppressing the Red Army. In various campaigns searching for the main force of Red Army, Chen's units experienced heavy casualties. In the fifth campaign against the Communists, he finally managed to defeat them, which forced the Red Army to launch its Long March.

Campaigns against the Red Army came to an end after the Xi'an Incident in which Chiang and his staff were forced to agree to co-operate with the communists against the invading Imperial Japanese Army.

== War against Japan ==
=== Military Activity ===
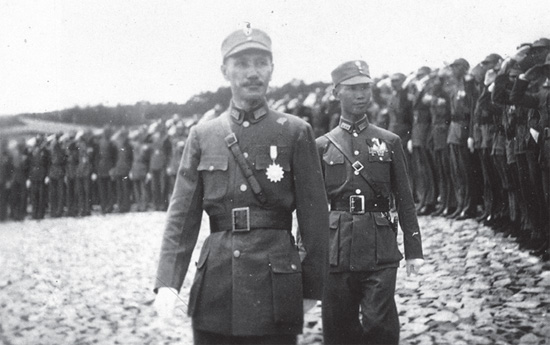
Chen Cheng (right) inspecting troops with Chiang Kai Shek

During the Battle of Shanghai, he was one of the top military assistants of Chiang Kai Shek. It was his idea to seek a decisive action in Southern China, rather than confronting the Japanese in Northern China, where Nationalist troops were in poor condition and lacked transporting vehicles. After the fall of Shanghai and of Nanjing, Chen moved to Hubei to command the Battle of Wuhan in 1938. Wuhan was the provisional headquarters of the Chinese Army. The Japanese, however, managed, despite heavy losses to defeat the Chinese and captured Wuhan on October 25, 1938.

In July 1938, Chen assumed the position of Secretary-General of the Three Principles of the People Youth Corps. The organization, established by Chiang Kai-shek in response to the Japanese invasion, was intended as an entity independent of the Kuomintang, designed to operate outside the party’s direct control and free from CC Clique influence. Due to the Chen’ military responsibilities, Chiang and Chen appointed Zhu Jiahua as acting Secretary-General, a move that has been interpreted as marking the beginning of Chen’s shift in focus from military to politic, and simultaneously regarded as a collaboration between Chen and Zhu against CC Clique.

In the last years of the war, Chen went on to command in the Battle of Changsha, the Battle of Yichang, and the Battle of West Hubei. In 1943, he was appointed the commander of the Chinese Expeditionary Force in the Burma Theater until he was replaced by Wei Li-huang because of illness.

=== Political Activity ===
In January 1938, Chen assumed leadership of the newly merged Political Department, which incorporated the Military Affairs Commission’s Sixth Department responsible for wartime party organization and training. This reorganization effectively transferred the KMT’s powers of organization, propaganda, and cadre training from Chen Lifu to Chen Cheng. In April of the same year, former CC Clique member Zhu Jiahua was appointed Secretary-General of the Kuomintang with Chiang Kai-shek’s support. From Chen Cheng’s perspective, the restructuring strengthened his control over party affairs and provided the institutional backing to counter the influence of rival factions, including the CC Clique, thereby consolidating his position within the KMT leadership. This restructuring marked the Whampoa Clique’s first significant senior-level intervention in KMT party affairs and constituted Chiang Kai-shek’s initial attempt to use the faction to curb the influence of the CC Clique.

As Secretary-General of the Three Principles of the People Youth Corps. Chen was mominally the second most important leader after Chiang Kai-shek. In practice, however, Chen’s control was constrained. The appointment of Kang Tse as acting head of the Organization Department, often have conflicts with Chen. General Xu Yongchang also critzed that Chen’s political commitments undermined his military responsibilities. Chiang Kai-shek’s subsequent decision to appoint Zhu Jiahua—an academic figure acceptable to both Chen and close to Kang Tse—as acting Secretary-General.

== Chinese Civil War ==
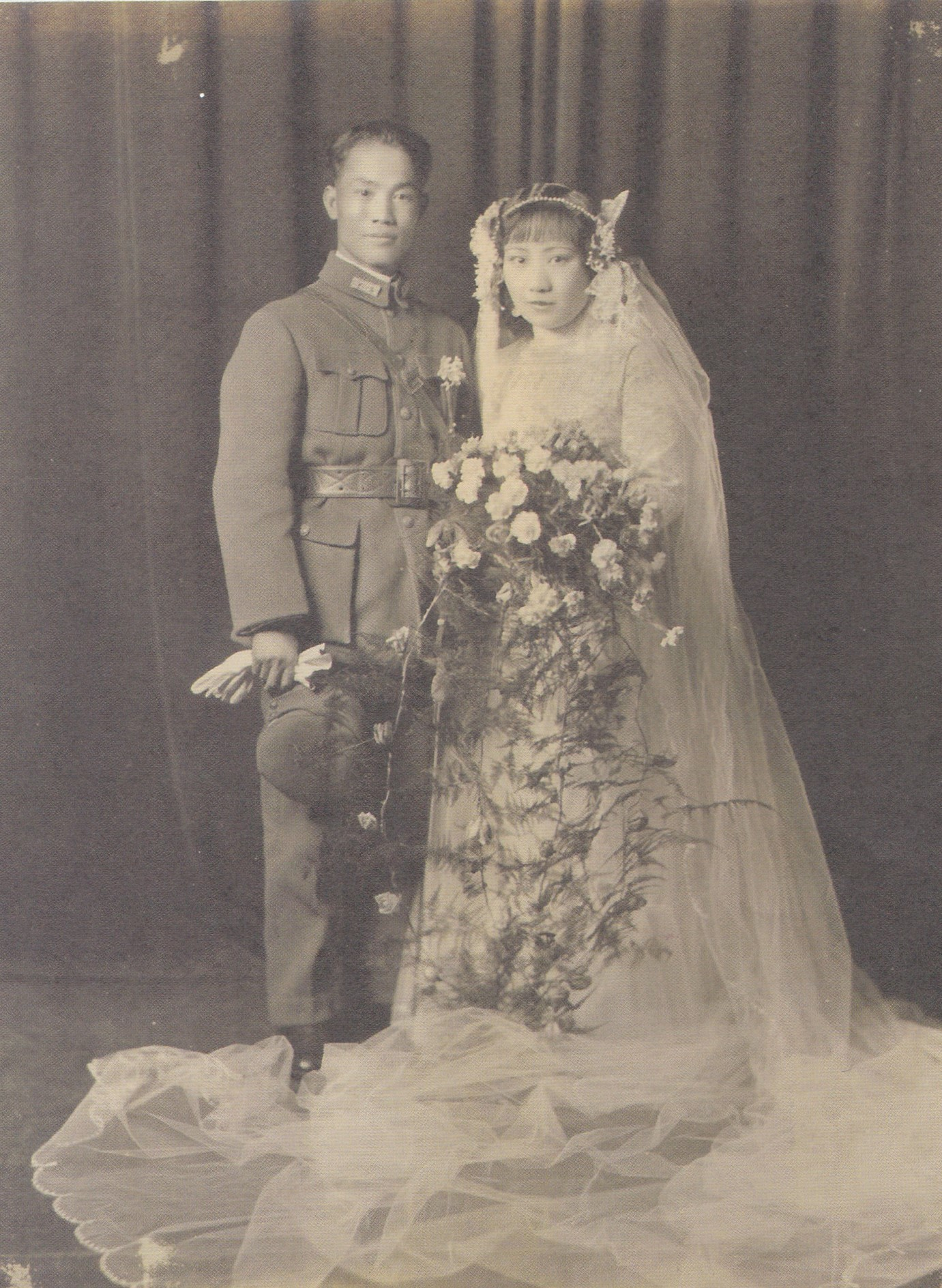
Engagement picture of Chen Shing and Tan Xiang (1932)

After the Second Sino-Japanese War, Chen became the Chief of the General Staff and commander-in-chief of the navy. He followed Chiang's orders and began to raid the "liberated" areas of the Red Army, which launched the Chinese Civil War.

In August 1947, Chiang appointed Chen as director of the Northeastern Headquarters to command the Nationalist forces against the Communists in that area. He made the crucial mistake of dissolving the local security regiments because they had served in the Japanese-collaborationist Manchukuo Imperial Army, which made the total Nationalist strength in Manchuria fall from 1.3 million to less than 480,000. He also dismissed some of the most capable Nationalist commanders, such as Du Yuming, Sun Li-jen, Zheng Dongguo, and Chen Mingren. As a result, he suffered a series of major defeats, and Chiang recalled Chen to Nanjing and sent Wei Lihuang to replace him in Shenyang as Commander-in-Chief of the Northeast and Fan Hanjie as deputy commander-in-chief and director of Jinzhou forward command center. Chen took a sick leave in Taiwan to treat his chronic stomach ailment.

== In Taiwan ==
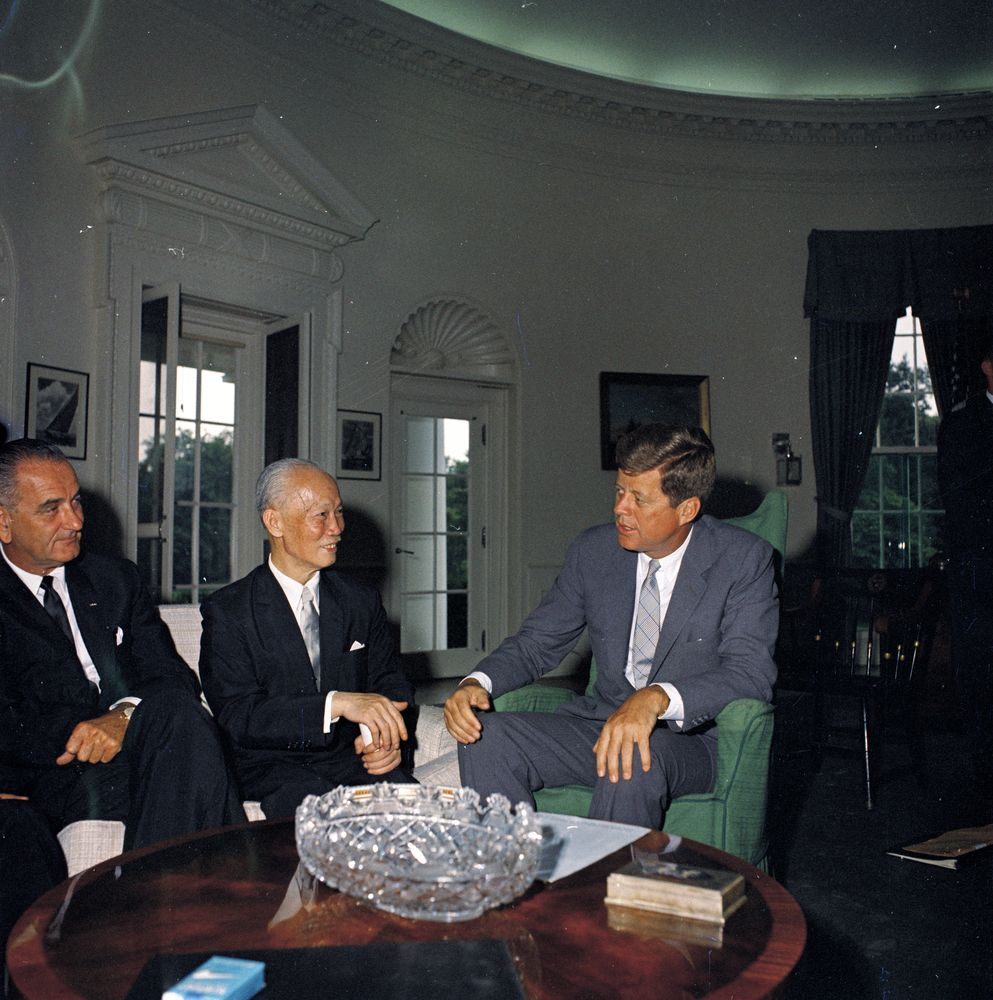
On July 31, 1961, Vice President Chen met with US President Kennedy and Vice President Johnson at the White House

=== Governorship ===
Chiang appointed Chen as the Governor of Taiwan Province in 1949 to plan the development of Taiwan as a Nationalist stronghold. After the Nationalist force retreated to Taiwan, Chen went on to hold key civilian government positions such as Vice-Executive of the Kuomintang, Vice President, and Premier of the Republic of China. He was the youngest premier since promulgation of the 1947 constitution to take office.

Chen's administrative style combined centralized authority with reliance on technocrats. As Premier, he promoted figures such as Yin Chung-jung, Yen Chia-kan, Yang Chi-tseng and Li Kwoh-ting, valuing professional expertise to drive Taiwan’s postwar reconstruction.

In his years on Taiwan, he introduced various land and economic reforms and carried out the reconstruction of Taiwan. Chen's 37.5% Arable Rent Reduction initiative was credited with stopping the spread of communism in Taiwan. The policy capped the rent farmers paid to landlords at 37.5% of the harvest. Prior to the directive, landlords had often sought more than half of the crop as payment.

Following the "37.5% Arable Rent Reduction Act" policy, Chen promptly initiated the Public Land Distribution in 1951, aiming to compulsorily acquire land from landlords. A total of 138,957 hectares were redistributed to 286,287 tenant farming households.

In 1952, the Land to the Tiller policy was implemented. Between 1949 and 1960, rice yields per hectare in Taiwan increased by approximately 50%, and farmers’ net income tripled. Land reform resulted in over 80% of Taiwanese farmers becoming owner-cultivators.

He advanced the national strategy of “People above All, Livehood First” alongside the dual policy of “using agriculture to nourish industry, and using industry to develop agriculture.”

He was also credited with launching several construction projects. One was the Shimen Reservoir, in Taoyuan County, which reduced flooding and increased the rice crop production.

Chen opposed the Kuomintang’s policy of launching a military counterattack against the mainland, repeatedly warning in meetings against taking reckless action. In his memoirs, he stated that while a military reconquest was impossible, “political, diplomatic, and economic counteroffensives” were still feasible.

Based on this view, Chen supported reducing military expenditure. A well-known episode during the drafting of the “19-Point Economic and Financial Reform Program”—aimed at ensuring Taiwan’s economic self-sufficiency after the cessation of U.S. aid—saw Chen, Yin Chung-jung, and Yen Chia-kan forgoing the Lunar New Year holiday to discuss persuading Chiang Kai-shek to cut defense spending. Ultimately, Yen proposed freezing the defense budget at its current nominal value, so that as national revenues increased, military spending would constitute a progressively smaller share of the budget. The three then presented this plan to Chiang, who eventually approved it.

=== White Terror ===
“The 37.5% Arable Rent Reduction Act must be fully implemented. There will certainly be difficulties, and perhaps shameless naughty troublemakers, but I believe there will be no one who truly does not care about their life.” — Chen Cheng, 1951

During the April 6 Incident (四六事件), a wave of student protests broke out in Taiwan against Kuomintang authoritarian rule in 1949. At the time, Chen Cheng ordered the suppression of the demonstrations and the arrest of a number of student activists.

On May 19, 1949, Chen promulgated the Order of Martial Law to announce the imposition of martial law throughout Taiwan to expel communist infiltration and to buffer defense capabilities.

As Governor of Taiwan, Chen also served concurrently as commander of the Taiwan Garrison Command and head of the High-level Intelligence Committee. He co-directed suppression campaigns against dissenters and curtailed the influence of the CC Clique by withholding budgetary support for its Bureau of Investigation.

Chen utilized the White Terror as a means to enforce land, economic, and political reforms. He ordered that anyone resisting or obstructing land reform be investigated by the Taiwan Garrison Command. Under Chen's strict measures, at least 4 generals, along with numerous business executives accused of corruption, spying or opposing reforms, were executed. While landlords opposing the land reform in Taiwan were not executed but instead handed over to the judiciary for prosecution, sending a clear warning to landlords that any defiance against government reforms would not be tolerated. A notable example involved military vehicles recklessly driving through Taipei, causing accidents. Chen decreed that any soldier operating vehicles who caused fatal accidents would be shot on the spot, with the executions publicized to landlords as a deterrent.

=== 1960 presidential succession and rift with Chiang ===
Under the 1947 Constitution, Chiang Kai-shek was expected to step down after completing two presidential terms by 1960. As Vice President and Premier of the ROC, as well as Vice Chairman of the KMT, Chen Cheng was widely regarded as the most likely successor to the presidency.

In the lead-up to the 1960 election, Chen made a high-profile visit to liberal scholar Hu Shih, urging Chiang to honor the constitutional term limits. At the same time, tensions between Chen and Chiang escalated over the appointment of the Minister of Education: Chiang supported the reappointment of Chang Ch'i-yun, while Chen backed Mei Yiqi. Chen ultimately prevailed in the dispute.

However, Chiang bypassed the succession question by engineering a constitutional amendment that allowed him to remain in office. Chen remained as Vice President, but the episode significantly damaged his relationship with Chiang.

=== Factional influence and the Tsotanhui Clique ===
After World War II, Chen Cheng cultivated a political faction within the Kuomintang known as the Tsotanhui Clique. This group was composed primarily of Chen’s loyalists from the Whampoa Military Academy, Three Principles of the People Youth Corps, and Blue Shirt Society.

Formed to counter the influence of the CC Clique led by Chen Lifu, the Tsotanhui Clique gained strength during the late 1940s. With Chiang Kai-shek's growing rift with the CC Clique, Chen leveraged his faction to secure key positions in the party and state. Notably, Liu Chien-chun, a pro-Chen Blue Shirt leader, was elected President of the Legislative Yuan with the clique’s backing.

By the early 1950s, the Tsotanhui Clique had become the dominant bloc in the Legislative Yuan, noted for its assertiveness and frequent clashes with both the CC Clique and Chiang Ching-kuo. It reflected Chen’s technocratic and conservative outlook, emphasizing administrative competence and party discipline.

Following Chen’s death in 1965, the clique continued under new leadership, including Vice Premier Huang Shao-ku, Legislative Yuan Vice President Ni Wenya, and KMT caucus leader Chao Tzu-chi.

== Death ==
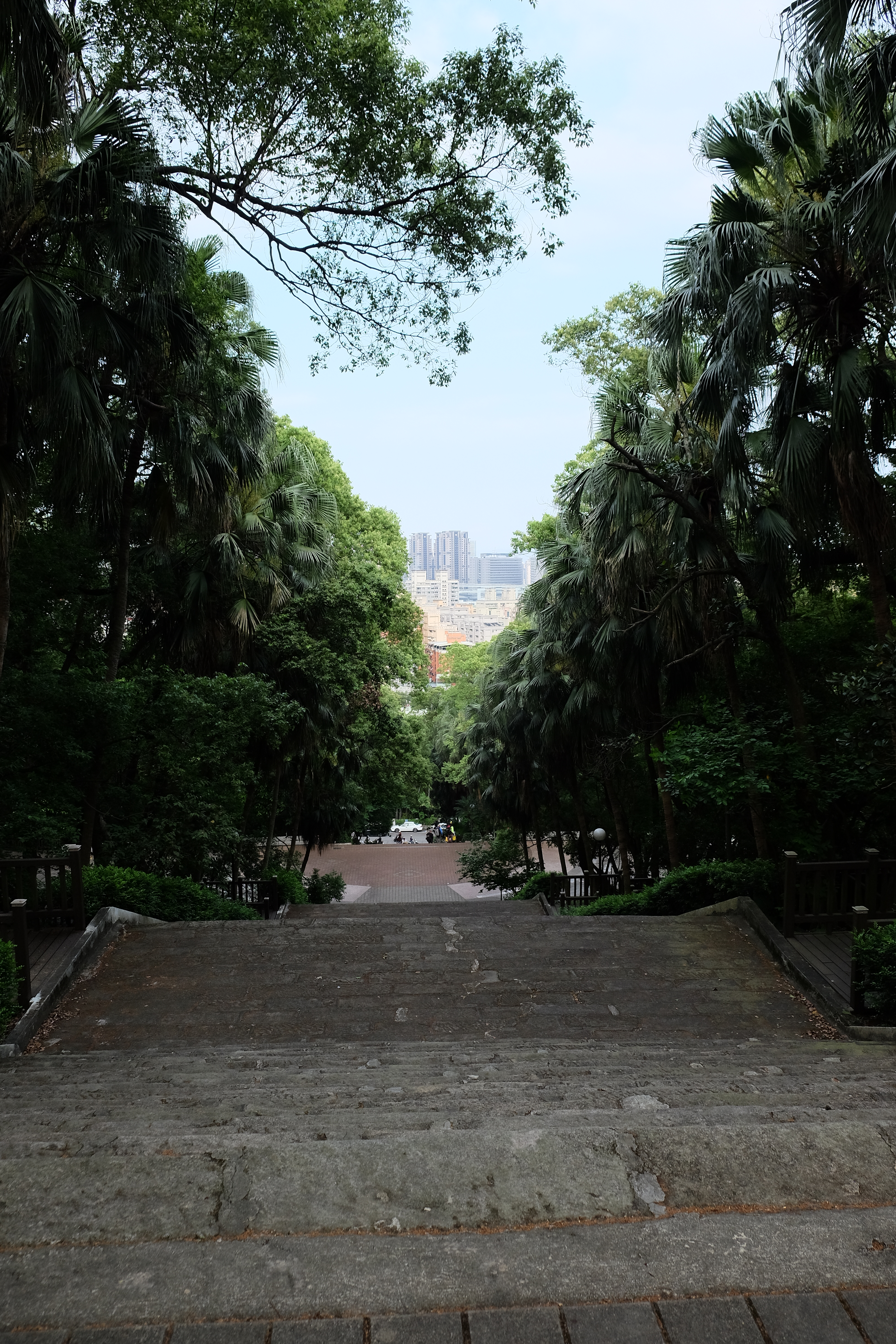
Chen Tsyr-shiou Memorial Park, former mausoleum and memorial of Chen, until 1995.

Chen died of liver cancer in 1965. Despite his wish to be cremated, Chiang ordered for a burial ceremony, which he was buried in Chen Tsyr-shiou Memorial Park, Taishan, Taipei. His cremated remains were moved to Fo Guang Shan, Kaohsiung County (now part of Kaohsiung City), in August 1995.

Following Chen Cheng's death, Chiang Kai-shek appointed Zhang Qun and others to oversee the funeral arrangements, forming a state funeral committee composed of senior officials, including the heads of the five Yuans of government. On March 6, Chiang paid his respects in person, and on March 10, he and his wife attended the memorial service held at the Taipei First Funeral Parlor. Chiang remarked, "I cannot live without Tsyr-shiou for even a day."

Chiang also composed a funeral couplet mourning Chen's death:

At the final moment of the struggle for national recovery, to mourn this loss—could it have been fated? The revolutionary cause remains unfinished, yet to lose my chief assistant—Is there no heaven above?

== Political and philosophical views ==
Source of this section: (Chen Cheng's Correspondence, published by Academia Historica)

Chen Cheng's political views evolved considerably during the early 1930s as he assumed increasingly central roles in the Nationalist military campaigns against the Chinese Communist Party. During this period, he began articulating a philosophy shaped by his military experience, frustrations with systemic corruption, and reflections on social justice.

In 1931, Chen Cheng articulated what he saw as the fundamental mission of the military and the essence of the Kuomintang’s revolutionary program:

Soldiers who wish to achieve their own liberation must first secure the liberation of the people. To achieve the liberation of the people, one must strive to overthrow imperialism and eradicate the Red bandits, thereby completing the national revolution of the Three Principles of the People. The national revolution of the Three Principles aims externally to overthrow imperialism and remove the shackles of unequal treaties (Nationalism); internally to topple the rule of warlords and bureaucrats, and establish a democratic political state (Democracy). Its ultimate purpose is to resolve the livelihood problems of the entire Chinese nation, fulfilling the four basic needs of the people — food, clothing, housing, and transportation (People’s Livelihood). On the one hand, it seeks to equalize land rights, control capital, prevent the emergence of capitalism (by implementing state-owned production); on the other hand, through peaceful means, it aims to resolve economic issues, realize social equality among classes, and promote social progress through the only correct ideology. The Kuomintang is the only revolutionary party that can save China.

In a private letter dated April 27, 1931, Chen expressed disillusionment over Chiang Kai-shek’s intent to publish an article on Christianity, stating that it caused him “great disappointment and pessimism regarding the future of the revolution.” Two days later, in a follow-up letter, he elaborated on his view that the Christian religion could not serve as an ideological bulwark against communism. He wrote:

The recent transformation of Chinese society is unprecedented in our history. The real challenge is how to align these changes with the needs of the masses, and to shape society into a more ideal model reflecting the collective will of the people. Although the present circumstances remain vague, there is no intrinsic necessity for a radical mutation in the political system. Communism is not a religion, and Christianity cannot be used to defeat it. Christianity has no foundational place in Chinese society. Youths lack firm beliefs, and cannot rely on Christianity as a moral core to strengthen their conviction.

Chen also articulated a socially conscious view of military service. While commanding Nationalist troops in the "Encirclement Campaigns" against Communist forces, he wrote that “a soldier is the guardian of the people” and that “military personnel must be emotionally aligned with the people.” He warned against military elitism, stressing that “a soldier should not deliberately seek to become a leader of civil society.”

In his correspondence, Chen expressed moral unease with his position in the military hierarchy. He described himself as “a hired gun for corrupt officials and local tyrants,” and “Protector of those who used the Three Principles of the People as a pretext to exploit the blood, wealth, and lives of the masses.”

Chen Cheng argued that Sun Yat-sen’s Three Principles of the People offered the most suitable path for China compared with liberalism, communism, and fascism.

Contemporary world political thought essentially follows four routes: the Anglo-American liberal democratic route; the Soviet route of class struggle; the now-discredited fascist route; and the Three Principles. Of these four, the Three Principles are unquestionably the most suitable to China’s national conditions. The nationalism of the Three Principles is founded on universal benevolence and seeks equality at home and independence abroad; it is fundamentally different from the aggressive imperialism of fascism. The Democracy component is a scheme of separated powers and representative democracy that, in my view, is more advanced than Anglo-American democracy. The People’s livelihood component envisages achieving social justice by peaceful, administrative means, effecting socialism without necessarily passing through a capitalist stage. On this basis the Three Principles represent a carefully judged, superior course among the world’s ideological alternatives. We must not abandon our own path simply to follow Western models. Moreover, our leader—the Chairman of the League (i.e. Chiang Kai-shek)—must be supported with genuine unity if this central doctrine is to be firmly established.

In his memoir To Construct Táiwān (《建設台灣》), Chen recalled that while convalescing in Shanghai he developed a keen interest in the British Labour Party. He specifically requested that a compilation on "the organization and politics of the British Labour Party" be prepared for him. According to Chen, "in several respects the politics of the British Labour Party were consistent with the ideas of Dr. Sun Yat-sen, and imperceptibly became a basis for formulating my reform policies."

Chen frequently advocated in both his memoirs and correspondence for drawing lessons from the British Labour Party's postwar governance. While recuperating in Shanghai, he commissioned a study entitled "The Organisation and Politics of the British Labour Party," remarking that in several respects its political philosophy paralleled the principles of Sun Yat-sen. Chen expressed admiration for what he described as the Labour Party's "bloodless socialism," which sought to guarantee every citizen a minimum standard of reasonable living without recourse to violent revolution.

In letters to Chiang Kai-shek and in administrative meetings, Chen cited the Labour government’s emphasis on educational and economic reform as fundamental to improving national welfare, arguing that other political and social challenges could be more easily resolved once these two areas were addressed. He urged the Kuomintang to formulate a limited number of basic, immediately actionable policies targeted at urgent public needs and to assign officials strict deadlines for their implementation. Chen regarded the Labour approach as an instructive model for Taiwan's development, especially in promoting social stability and economic progress without class conflict.

Late in his life, Chen reaffirmed his longstanding interest in agrarian reform, declaring in his memoirs that: “To contribute meaningfully to the land reform of our nation has been my lifelong aspiration.”

== Legacy and assessment ==
When Chen died in 1965, the government published two official commemorative volumes in the same year: the 527-page Chen Cheng Xiansheng Zhuan (陳誠先生傳), and the 458-page Chen Fu Zongtong Jinian Ji (陳副總統紀念集). Both works devoted substantial sections to praising Chen's contributions to Taiwan's modernization, and included numerous photographs depicting Taiwanese peasants mourning his death.

Chen's daughter, Chen Hsing, and his son-in-law, Yu Chuan-tao, wrote in the preface to Chen Cheng's Correspondence that his guiding philosophy in life was to have "the compassion of a bodhisattva, but to act with the methods of thunderbolts (meaning forceful or drastic measures)."

== Honors ==
Key to the City

- Manila, Philippines (March 20, 1960)
- Pasay City, Philippines (March 20, 1960)

Political offices
Preceded by Wey Daw-ming	Governor of Taiwan Province; January 5, 1949 – December 21, 1949	Succeeded by Wu Kuo-Chen
Government offices
Preceded by Yan Xishan	Premier of the Republic of China; March 7, 1950 – June 7, 1954	Succeeded by Yü Hung-chün
Preceded by Yü Hung-chün	Premier of the Republic of China; June 30, 1958 – December 15, 1963	Succeeded by Yen Chia-kan
Preceded by Li Zongren	Vice President of the Republic of China; March 12, 1954 – March 5, 1965	Succeeded by Yen Chia-kan
Preceded by Position established	Chief of the General Staff of the Republic of China Armed Forces; March 23, 1946 – May 12, 1948	Succeeded by Gu Zhutong
