= Three Principles of the People Youth Corps =

Chinese paramilitary youth wing, 1938–1946

Three Principles of the People Youth Corps 三民主義青年團
- Leader: Chiang Kai-shek; Chen Cheng; Kang Tse
- Founded: 1938 July 9
- Dissolved: 1947 September
- Ideology: Three Principles of the People; Chinese nationalism Anti-communism
- Mother party: Kuomintang; Blue Shirts Society

The Three Principles of the People Youth Corps (Chinese: 三民主義青年團; pinyin: Sānmín Zhǔyì Qīngnián Tuán), sometimes abbreviated as Sanqingtuan (Chinese: 三青團; pinyin: Sānqīngtuán) was a nationalist paramilitary youth organization founded by Chiang Kai-shek in Wuchang in 1938. Chiang served as its leader, with Chen Cheng (1938–1940, 1946–1947, acting by Zhu Jiahua in his first term) and Zhang Zhizhong (1940–1946) served as its secretaries-general. Established during the Second Sino-Japanese War, the Corps aimed to mobilize and train young people for the war effort. It was also widely regarded as an instrument for Chiang to counterbalance the influence of the civilian-dominated CC Clique within the Kuomintang, consolidating support among Whampoa Military Academy protégés, particularly members of the secret ultranationalist Kuomintang faction, the Blue Shirts Society.

Chiang Kai-shek sought to use the Blue Shirts Society's organizational base and manpower as the foundation for the Three Principles of the People Youth Corps, aiming to stimulate the Kuomintang and expand the party's social support, particularly among youth nationwide. With Chiang's backing, the Youth Corps enjoyed a degree of operational autonomy, not being directly controlled by the CC Clique-dominated party apparatus, and was quickly presented as a new generation for the National Revolutionary movement. However, the combination of Chiang's design and factional infiltration led to immediate tensions: party leaders, especially from the CC Clique, questioned the Corps' nature and status, while a sense of organizational independence grew within the Corps itself. Both sides pursued dual-track development, with activities overlapping into political spheres, resulting in conflict rather than cooperation. Within a year of its founding, Chiang, the Kuomintang, and the Youth Corps' leadership began issuing policy statements and implementing regulations to adjust the party–corps relationship, but these measures proved insufficient to bridge the emerging divide.

The training program of the Youth Corps extended beyond political education. According to the "Training Plan for Youth Corps Members" adopted by the Central Executive Committee in May 1940, members were required to develop technical skills such as driving, horsemanship, swimming, reconnaissance, and mechanical repair, as well as engage in rural outreach, public health work, relief, first aid, and propaganda activities. In addition, the Corps demanded proficiency in military science, standardized drills, and combat training.

The Youth Corps was not an extension of traditional Chinese institutions but was instead modeled on foreign youth organizations, such as the Boy Scouts, the Soviet Komsomol, the German Hitler Youth, and the Italian Fascist Youth, all of which promoted ideological loyalty and fanaticism. Its creation reflected the global environment of the 1920s and 1930s, when states sought to consolidate political authority through youth mobilization. Like the Scouts, the Young Pioneers, and other mass youth movements in China, the Corps combined recreational elements with strict political indoctrination. The requirement that all members remain loyal to Chiang Kai-shek exemplified the authoritarian character of the party-state, a tendency also visible in the Youth Corps' official oath of membership.

Today, the Kuomintang has a youth wing called the Kuomintang Youth League, but it is not directly related as it was established in 2006.

== History ==
The origins of the Three Principles of the People Youth Corps can be traced to Chiang Kai-shek's dissatisfaction with the lack of discipline and corruption within the Kuomintang (KMT), as well as the intense factional struggle between the civilian-based CC Clique and the military-oriented Blue Shirts Society, both of which were loyal to Chiang. At the Fifth National Congress of the Kuomintang in 1935, Chiang delivered a sharp denunciation of the party's weaknesses, declaring: "The most important problem is that party members are irresponsible, lack spirit, and are unwilling to exert themselves to study and create in service of the Party and the State. At such a critical time for the nation, I dare say the Party and the State cannot endure for three more years; soon others will shake the foundations of our Party-State, and our Party and nation will perish."

The outbreak of the Second Sino-Japanese War accelerated efforts to create the Youth Corps as a mechanism for comprehensive integration of the Party-State. In 1937, Chiang even proposed merging all political parties—including the Chinese Communist Party, the Young China Party, and the State Socialist Party—into a single body called the "National Revolutionary League." On 5 February 1938, in a speech in Wuhan, Chiang first referred to the Youth Corps, describing it as a new organizational "center" for the Kuomintang.

In February 1938, Chiang Kai-shek outlined the intended power structure of the Youth Corps in his essay Expectations for Senior Cadres, stating that one part shall be civil and one part military. The military sphere, including the army, military opportunities, society, military training, and organization, shall be directed by the Political Department; the civil sphere—political, social, cultural, and educational affairs—shall be directed by the Ministry of Education. At that time, Chen Cheng served as Minister of the Political Department and Chen Lifu as Minister of Education, indicating that Chiang still sought a balance of leadership between the Whampoa faction (within which the Blue Shirt Society constituted the radical wing) and the CC Clique. In practice, however, the Blue Shirt Society, under the leadership of Kang Tse and He Zhonghan, came to monopolize administration, a development that received implicit approval from Chiang Kai-shek.

In October 1937, Chiang Kai-shek tasked Kang Tse and Liu Chien-chun, both co-founders of the Blue Shirts Society, with preparing for the establishment of the Youth Corps. They were also instructed to liaise with the Kuomintang's other major factions, including the CC Clique and the Reorganization Group. Within this process, Chen Lifu sought to claim the position of secretary-general and urged Chiang to formally place the Youth Corps under the Party's direct control. But the proposals were ultimately rejected by Chiang.

On 9 July 1938, the Youth Corps was officially established with Chiang Kai-shek as its leader. Wang Jingwei was named chairman of the Advisory Council, while the supreme executive staff included Chen Cheng, Zhu Jiahua, Chen Lifu, Ho Chung-han, Chang Li-sheng, Chen Bulei, T'an Ping-shan, Ku Cheng-kang, and Tuan Hsi-peng. Chen Cheng was appointed secretary-general, with Yuan Shouqian and Zheng Yanfen as deputy secretary-generals, and Yeh Su-chung as chief secretary. The Corps was organized into several departments:

- Organization: Hu Zongnan (permanently represented by Kang Tse)
- Training: Wang Tung-yuan, Ni Wen-ya
- Propaganda: Huang Chi-lu, Zheng Yanfen
- Social Service: Lu Zuofu
- General Affairs: Chen Liang
- Youth Work Management: Chen Hsueh-ping
- Women's Work: Chang Ai-chen

=== Factionism ===
Among the Youth Corps' core leadership were prominent members of the Blue Shirts Society, including Hu Tsung-nan, Kang Tse, Ho Chung-han, and Ni Wen-ya. Some former members of the CC Clique, such as Chang Li-sheng and Tuan Hsi-peng, also broke away from the faction to support Chen Cheng, further consolidating Blue Shirt influence at both the leadership and grassroots levels. This development was viewed negatively by CC Clique leaders. Chi Shi-ying, a close associate of Chen Lifu, criticized the Corps as "the Blue Shirts' resurrection under another name, which fundamentally altered its character." In his memoirs, Chen Lifu likewise remarked that "Kang was highly ambitious—he hoped to make the Youth Corps into an organization outside to the Party."

Between 1937 and 1939, Chiang Kai-shek's authority within the Youth Corps was followed by four leading figures in the party apparatus: Secretary-General Chen Cheng, Acting Secretary-General Zhu Jiahua, Director of the Organization Department Hu Zongnan, and Acting Director Kang Tse. According to Kang's later recollection, his influence within the party expanded significantly through the organizational networks of the Blue Shirts Society. As he wrote: "At that time, apart from bearing actual responsibility in the Organization Section, through the Blue Shirt members distributed across various departments and groups, I formed in the Central Provisional Executive Committee a de facto center for personnel connections and for driving work forward. My opinions were respected and effective everywhere, whether Chen Cheng or Chen Lifu liked it or not."

Contemporaries gradually came to view the Youth Corps as being dominated by the Blue Shirt Society. After the Corps was founded, Kang maintained a reserved, at times strained, attitude toward Chen Cheng, rooted in their earlier complicated relationship. By contrast, he expressed a markedly more favorable view of Acting Secretary-General Zhu Jiahua. After Zhu assumed responsibility for party affairs, his competition with the CC Clique prompted him to cultivate support from military factions. Zhu's relatively limited interference in Corps affairs also created additional space for Kang to exercise authority. Some contemporaries further believed that because Kang advocated fascist ideas, his relationship with Zhu—known for his pro-German sympathies—was naturally close.

As Acting Secretary-General, Zhu concluded that the Youth Corps' central structure was excessively large. With Chiang Kai-shek's approval, he reorganized the seven original sections into three—Secretariat, Organization, and Propaganda—headed respectively by Yeh Su-chung, Hu Zongnan (with Kang acting), and Huang Jilu. This restructuring substantially increased the influence of Kang and the Blue Shirt Society within the Corps.

In reciprocity, Kang tended to respect Zhu's preferences in personnel assignments. In August 1938, the Corps' Organization Section requested that Zhu recommend candidates for provincial, municipal, frontier, and overseas branches, enclosing ten recommendation forms. Chu nominated ten individuals, including Chang Chao-chih, Tsao Wen-yen, Li Yin-hsi, Chang Ting-hua, Chen Shao-hsien, Tai Shih-hsi, Liu Shih-mi, Yuan Chi-chiung, Li Kuei-ting, and Yao Po-lung. Of those whose records are traceable, six had professional or institutional ties to Zhu's earlier positions, suggesting that Zhu was consciously introducing his own factional influence into the Corps.

Kang's cooperation with Zhu contrasted sharply with his hostile attitude toward the CC Clique. Immediately after the Corps was established, CC leader Chang Li-sheng—then director of the Central Organization Department—sent Kang a thick roster of nearly three hundred CC affiliates in various localities. Such an aggressive move led Kang to suspect that the CC Clique intended to seize control of local Corps organizations. Because of CC interest in Corps personnel resources, Kang and Chu reportedly developed a tacit understanding to jointly resist CC encroachment.

Zhu and Kang continued cooperating in personnel matters even after Zhu left the position of Acting Secretary-General. Zhu later recommended candidates for the Peiping-Tientsin regional branch, and in 1943 he endorsed nominees for provincial branch secretary positions in Zhejiang, Gansu, Shanxi, and Ningxia. Overall, Zhu's interventions remained limited: "At most he introduced one or two people into local Corps branches," and those recommended, including Wu Shaoshu of the Wuhan and Shanghai branches and Wang Wen-chun of the Qinghai branch, reportedly worked harmoniously with existing Fuxing Society members.

Zhu maintained close ties not only with Acting Director Kang but also with the nominal Organization Department director Hu Zongnan, then stationed in Shaanxi. In June 1939, when Yu Zhenying visited Chu before inspecting party affairs in Shaanxi, Shanxi, Chahar, and Suiyuan, Chu inquired about Yu's relationship with Hu and remarked: "The work of the Premier Sun Yat-sen has been inherited and expanded by Generalissimo Chiang. The one who will inherit Chiang's work in the future will be Hu Zongnan. Please tell Hu that if he has any opinions regarding party affairs, he may relay them to me, and I will certainly carry them out."

On 13 July 1939, Zhu voluntarily submitted his resignation as Acting Secretary-General of the Youth Corps. In his memorial to Chiang, he wrote: "A full year has passed since the Corps was founded, yet little progress has been made. The reluctance of various parties to cooperate has proven difficult to overcome. Although you have repeatedly instructed me to pursue fundamental tasks with all effort, no rapid results have been achieved. I truly find myself unable to fulfill the responsibilities of Acting Secretary-General, nor can I devote the necessary time and energy without failing your expectations." On 16 July, Chiang began searching for a replacement and first considered Wang Shijie, who immediately declined. When Chiang pressed again the next day, Wang replied: "Since leaving the Ministry of Education over a year ago, I have felt I lack the ability to lead youth training work. I still cannot accept. Over the past year, most affairs of the Youth Corps have been handled by Kang Tse and others, and their training methods largely imitate those of the Communists and secret societies, leading society to distrust them."
