= Battle of West Hubei =

Battle of the Second Sino-Japanese War

- Part of the Second Sino-Japanese War
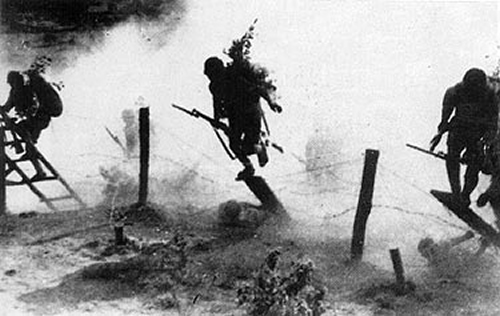
- Soldiers in camouflage running during the battle
Date	May 5 – June 11, 1943 (1 month and 6 days)
Location	Western part of Hubei province in the Republic of China 29°09′20″N 112°14′43″E
Result	Chinese victory
Territorial changes	Withdrawal of Imperial Japanese Armed Forces from West Hubei to their initial position

Belligerents
China; United States (air support only)	Empire of Japan

Commanders and leaders
(Republic of China (1912–1949)) Chen Cheng (Republic of China (1912–1949)) Sun Lianzhong (Republic of China (1912–1949)) Hu Lien (Republic of China (1912–1949)) Wang Zuanxu (Republic of China (1912–1949)) Luo Guangwen (Republic of China (1912–1949)) Fang Tien (Republic of China (1912–1949)) Song Kendang (Republic of China (1912–1949)) Gao Zhuodong (Republic of China (1912–1949)) Mu Ting-Fang	(Empire of Japan) Isamu Yokoyama (Empire of Japan) Takeshi Takashina (Empire of Japan) Yamamoto Mitsuo (Empire of Japan) Akashika Tadashi (Empire of Japan) Sumida Raishiro (Empire of Japan) Aoki Seiichi

Units involved
National Revolutionary Army; 6th War Area; 41 divisions from : 86th Army; 10th Army Group; 87th Army; 94th Army; Total : 6 divisions; 26th Army Group; 75th Army; 66th Army; Total : 5 divisions; 29th Army Group; 44th Army; 67th Army; 73rd Army; Total : 9 divisions; 33rd Army Group; 59th Army; 77th Army; 79th Army; 30th Army; Total : 12 divisions; 26th Army; 99th Army; River defense force; 32nd Army; 18th Army; 11th Division; 18th Division; 8 divisions from other support units : Republic of China Artillery units Republic of China Navy: National Revolutionary Army Air Force; Bombardment Group; 5 bombardment groups; Pursuit Group; 4 pursuit groups; United States Army Air Force; China Area Task Force; 23rd Fighter Group; 4 squadrons; 11th Bombardment Squadron	Imperial Japanese Army; 11th Army; Divisions; 3rd Division; 13th Division; 39th Division; 40th Division; Brigade/Detachments; 17th Independent Mixed Brigade; Haragaya detachment (34th Division); Nozoe Detachment (58th Division) (Empire of Japan); Imperial Japanese Army Air Service; 44th Air Regiment; Imperial Japanese Navy

Strength
6th War Area in the main battlefield : 264,700 5th and 9th War Areas in supporting operations : 66,884	120,000

Casualties and losses
Chinese Claim : From 15 February until 30 June 1943 : (Note: Includes losses of the : 6th War Area from February 15 until March 31 in the battles along the Yangtze River (excluding the independent 128th division) and from May 5 until June 30; 5th and 9th War Areas in two supporting operations from March 13 until April 10 and from May 14 until June 16; Air Force); 23,550 killed 18,295 wounded 7,270 missing 6th War Area from 5 May until 30 June 1943 : 14,723 killed 12,229 wounded 10,614 missing Japanese Claim : 30,766 killed 4,279 captured	Chinese Claim : 25,000 killed and wounded 40 aircraft destroyed 122 naval vessels damaged or sunk Japanese Claim : 771 killed 2,746 wounded
- Location within Hubei Battle of West Hubei (China)

The Battle of West Hubei (traditional Chinese: 鄂西會戰; simplified Chinese: 鄂西会战; pinyin: È Xī Huìzhàn), was one of 22 major engagements between the National Revolutionary Army and the Imperial Japanese Armed Forces during the Second Sino-Japanese War. It was also one of four major battles that took place in Hubei.

The battle resulted in a Chinese strategic victory, although they lost more troops than the Japanese Army. The Chinese government reported that the Chinese had scored a major victory. Japanese troops retreated to their former positions.

== Combat ==
The Japanese first attacked with 40,000 troops in the 2 armies of the 26th Group Army with about 50,000 troops in 3 divisions, then attacked the 2 armies of the 10th Army with about 60,000 men, and finally attacked the upper reaches of the Yangtze River with 70,000 troops. The two armies of the Jiang Fang Army transported the ships they had already captured along the river to Hankou.

The 13th Division of the Japanese Army had more than 20,000 troops. On the night of May 12, the IJA smuggled their forces across the Yangtze River from Shashi and other places in the gap between the Jiangnan defenders, and attacked the 87th Army garrisoned from the northwest on the next morning. At the same time, IJA forces occupied Anhui. The Japanese 3rd Division and other divisions in the rural area also marched westward to the southeast to attack the 87th Army. The two Japanese troops formed a pincer offensive. As of the 28th, the Japanese troops who had crossed the Qingjiang River had approached the No. 1 national army guarding Shipai Fortress, near the road defense line - Nanlinpo position. Chen Cheng of the National Army decided to fight the enemy on the Qingjiang River and on the front line of Shipai Fortress. The decisive battle date was scheduled to be between 31st and June 1. On the other hand, after the main force of the 13th Division of the Japanese Army crossed the Qingjiang River, it was blocked by the 121st Division of the National Army and had to venture over Tianzhu Mountain in the middle of Changyang. The horses lost a lot of weight on the way. The 5th Division of the National Army set up an ambush on the Tianzhushan main road and retreated after killing hundreds of Japanese troops. On May 30, after suffering heavy casualties, the 13th Division broke through the strategically important Muqiao Creek near Shipai and attacked Taishi Bridge. The main force of the 5th Division of the National Army used the dangerous terrain of Taishi Bridge to set up an ambush. When the Japanese army entered the ambush circle, the National Army fired violently at the Japanese army with intensive firepower, and then engaged in hand-to-hand combat. The national army repelled more than 10 consecutive Japanese attacks by virtue of its difficult terrain. The main force of the 13th Division of the Japanese Army was blocked in the area of Taishiqiao and Muqiaoxi, laying the foundation for the subsequent siege of Shipai.

== Results ==
The Chinese government and Western media reported that the Chinese had scored a major victory. Historian Barbara W. Tuchman, however, writes that the "Japanese withdrew without pursuit from what appeared to have been a training and foraging offensive to collect rice and river shipping." However, he also states that the battle ended in a tactical draw.

The 1944 book Pictorial History of the Second World War said that a critical pass on the way to Chongqing was captured by China and massive casualties were inflicted on the 2 reinforced Japanese divisions attempted to attack West Hubei, and 5 Japanese divisions were trapped at the Henan-Hubei border. The Japanese offensive was made out of 8 columns and the Japanese launched 13 failed offensives in the campaign.

== Changjiao massacre ==
During the period of the Battle of West Hubei, Japanese troops reportedly slaughtered more than 30,000 civilians at a factory in the tiny hamlet of Changjiao, northern Hunan, over a three-day period from 9–12 May 1943.
