= Blue Shirts Society =

Secretive ultranationalist faction within the Kuomintang

Society for the Practice of the Three Principles of the People 三民主義力行社 Sānmínzhǔyì Lìxíng Shè
- Leader: Chiang Kai-shek
- Members: Hu Zongnan; Kang Tse; Liu Chien-chun; Ni Wenya; Dai Li; He Zhonghan; Teng Chie; Xiao Zanyu; Gui Yongqing; Zheng Jiemin
- Founded: 1932
- Dissolved: 1938
- Succeeded by: Tsotanhui Clique
- Youth wing: Three Principles of the People Youth Corps
- Membership (1935): 10000
- Ideology: Chinese ultranationalism Fascism; Three Principles of the People; Anti-communism; Chiangism
- Colours: Blue
- Slogan: "Nationalise, Militarise, Productivise"
- Part of: Kuomintang

Party flag

Blue Shirts Society
- Traditional Chinese: 藍衣社
- Simplified Chinese: 蓝衣社
Transcriptions
Standard Mandarin
- Hanyu Pinyin: Lányī Shè
- Wade–Giles: Lan^{2} I^{1} Shê^{4}
- IPA: [lǎn í ʂɤ̂]

The Blue Shirts Society (BSS; Chinese: 藍衣社; pinyin: Lányī Shè) (Note: Also known as the Society for the Practice of the Three Principles of the People (Chinese: 三民主義力行社; pinyin: Sānmínzhǔyì Lìxíng Shè), the Spirit Encouragement Society (Chinese: 勵志社; pinyin: Lìzhì Shè) and the China Reconstruction Society (Chinese: 中華復興社; pinyin: Zhōnghuá Fùxīng Shè)) was a secret ultranationalist faction in the Kuomintang inspired by German and Italian fascists. The Blue Shirts Society, which was primarily composed of military officers, and the CC Clique, which was dominated by civilian bureaucrats, remained engaged in an intense factional struggle within the Kuomintang. In 1938, with the creation of the Three Principles of the People Youth Corps as an organization operating outside of direct party control, Chiang Kai-shek placed the Corps largely under the influence of the Blue Shirts Society. This shift allowed the Blue Shirts to expand their political role at the expense of the CC Clique. After the Second World War, many leading figures of the Blue Shirts Society, such as Kang Tse, Liu Chien-chun, and Ni Wen-ya, were incorporated into the faction led by Chen Cheng, commonly known as the Tsotanhui Clique.

The rise and fall of the Blue Shirt Society was rapid, but obscure, and it was seldom mentioned again by either the KMT or the Chinese Communist Party after the establishment of the People's Republic of China and the following KMT retreat to Taiwan.

== Membership and development ==
Chiang Kai-shek founded the Blue Shirts in 1932. Its leaders were young officers from the Nationalist army. Although in its early stage the society's most important members came from the Whampoa Military Academy, and constituted elements of the KMT's Whampoa Clique, by the 1930s its influence extended into the military and political spheres, and had influence upon China's economy and society. Historian Jeffrey Crean notes, however, that while the Blue Shirts impacted elite politics, it had little impact on the rural people who were the vast majority of China's population. Membership peaked at 10,000 in 1935.

Membership in the Blue Shirts Society was kept a strict secret:

With a view to attaining the object of immediately overthrowing the feudal influences, exterminating the Red Bandits, and dealing with foreign insult[s], members of the Blue Shirts Society should conduct in secret their activities in various provinces, counties, and cities, except for the central Kuomintang headquarters and other political organs whose work must be executed in an official manner."

— Liu Chien-chun

Chiang did not publicly acknowledge the existence of the Blue Shirts. Academic Stephanie M. Wong writes, "[T]he Blue Shirts were a secret fascist society within the Whampoa Clique to which even the wider Nationalist Party did not have access. The group's hallmark was maintaining so rigorous an anonymity that even government officers could not be certain of Blue Shirt membership."

== Ideology and rhetoric ==
The Blue Shirts articulated a slogan of "Nationalise, Militarise, Productivise". Blue Shirt rhetoric stressed contempt for liberal democracy and the political usefulness of violence. Blue Shirts favored a "permanent purge" of bureaucracy, and in their view a "mass violence organization" was necessary to achieve that purge.

Blue Shirt ideology was influenced by contact with the Nazi advisors to the KMT, such as Hermann Kriebel. The organization was inspired by the German Sturmabteilung and the Italian Blackshirts, although unlike those organizations, the Blue Shirts were composed of political elites, not the popular masses.

Historians Paul Jackson and Cyprian Balmires, have classified the Blue Shirt Society as a "fascistic" ultranationalist group as opposed to a "fascist" group. Political scientist Maria Hsia Chang wrote that the Blue Shirts Society functioned as a model of "developmental nationalism".

Historian Jeffrey Crean notes that the Blue Shirts impacted only elite politics, not the vast majority of China's population. According to historian Jay Taylor, the Blue Shirts were anti-Japanese and anti-imperialist.

== Whole New Culture Movement ==
The New Life Movement developed from within the Blue Shirt Society. Xiao Zuolin (肖作霖), a BSS member early on, drafted a plan called the Whole New Culture Movement and proposed the establishment of an organization called the Chinese Culture Academy to increase the BSS's influence in culture. Xiao got Deng Wenyi's support and carried out his plan by taking over several newspapers and journals, and by enrolling its members in universities. Its scheme of forging a movement for a new culture was adopted by Chiang, and on 19 February 1934, he announced the New Life Movement at a meeting in Nanchang. The plan involved reconstructing the moral system of the Chinese and welcoming a renaissance and reconstruction of Chinese national pride.

In connection with the New Life Movement, some Blue Shirts attacked what they deemed as symbols of Western decadence like dance halls and movie theaters. Some threw acid on Chinese dressed in Western attire.

In March, Chiang issued guidance, consisting of 95 rules of the New Life Movement, being a mixture of Chinese traditions and western standards. It was a vast propaganda movement, with war mobilization and military maneuvers on a scale that China had never experienced before. But because the plan was so ambitious and rigid, and because its policies created too much inconvenience in the everyday lives of the people, it fell into disfavor. Nearly three years later in 1936, Chiang had to accept that his favorite movement had failed. Deng, Kang and Jiang Xiaoxian (蔣孝先), Chiang's nephew and bodyguard, also BSS members were appointed General Secretariats of the New Life Movement, with supervision of public lifestyles enforced by BSS cadres. By controlling the mouthpieces of the KMT, the BSS openly expressed advocacy of fascism in its publications.

With the New Culture Movement failed but still officially ongoing, the BSS spread its influence into the cultural centers of Shanghai and other major cities that used to be the CC Clique's power base.

== Other ==
The Blue Shirts supported Korean independence activist and left-wing nationalist Kim Won-bong-led Korean National Revolutionary Party. Among the Korean nationalists who worked for the Blue Shirts, these formed the White Shirts Society in American-occupied Korea in 1945. The founder of the White Shirts, Yeom Dong-jin also associated with other Blue Shirts members to join the Bureau of Investigation and Statistics of the National Revolutionary Army (Chinese: 國民政府軍事委員會調查統計局, also known as the Juntong), which performed the espionage, assassination and intelligence services for Chiang's Kuomintang regime.

== See also ==
- Tsotanhui Clique
- Anti-communism in China
- CC Clique
- Chiangism
- Chinese state nationalism
- Dai Li
- Political color
- Political uniform
- Red Shirts (United States)
