= Wang Chang-hui =

Chinese politician (1918–??)

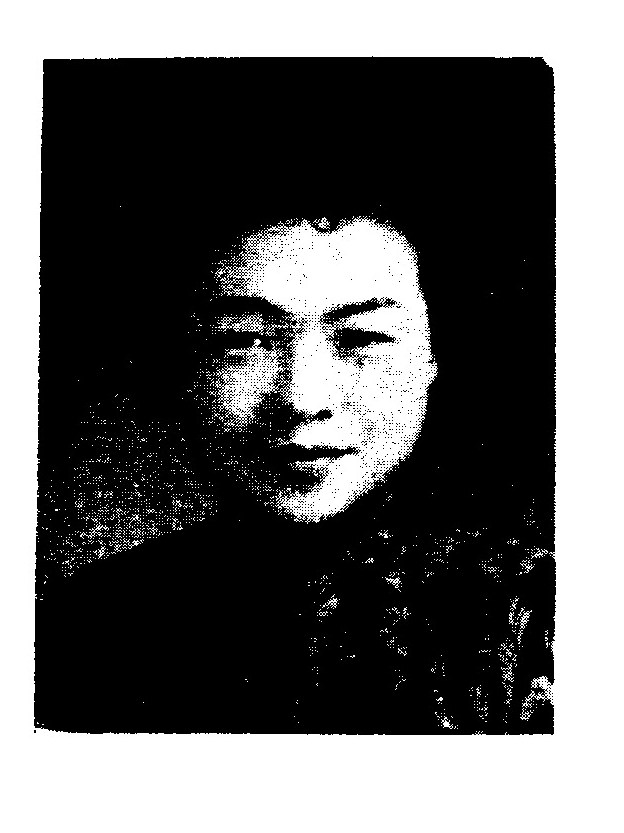

Member of the Legislative Yuan
- In office 1948–1991
- Constituency: Women's Trade Unions

Personal details
- Born: 4 October 1918 Nanjing, China

Wang Chang-hui (Chinese: 王長慧, born 4 October 1918) was a Chinese trade unionist and politician. She was among the first group of women elected to the Legislative Yuan in 1948.

== Biography ==
Wang was born in Nanjing in October 1918. She was educated at Nanjing Zhongnan Middle School and Shanghai Liangjiang Women's Sports Teachers College, after which she attended National Chengchi University. During the Second Sino-Japanese War she was a member of the Women's Mobilization Committee of the Ninth War Zone and chaired the Hubei Women's Anti-Enemy Association. She moved to Hankou, where she became director of the Hankou Women's Association and a member of the Education Committee of Hankou Federation of Trade Unions. She married Ting Yu-chuan, with whom she had three children.

In the 1948 elections for the Legislative Yuan, Wang was elected to parliament as one of the women trade union representatives. She relocated to Taiwan during the Chinese Civil War, where she remained a member of the Legislative Yuan until 1991. During her time in parliament she served as convener of the Transportation Committee.

Wang, as a member of the Kuomintang's Tsotanhui Clique, was known for maintaining a radical and hardline stance throughout her legislative career. In 1962, during a session of the Legislative Yuan, she delivered a forceful criticism of entrenched privilege within the Republic of China's political system. She declared:

"'Privilege' has become an incurable disease in Chinese politics. Its shadow lingers across all corners of society, because there are simply too many people who manipulate privilege or strive to turn themselves into members of a privileged class in order to gain illicit benefits. Overt privileges are relatively few in Taiwan; the hidden ones are far more numerous. For example, while military service and taxation are basic duties of all citizens, the wealthy privileged class continues to accumulate assets while paying less in taxes than others. Their children are allowed to study abroad without taking required exams, and their sons manage to alter their draft classifications. If we do not eradicate privilege, we will all be left with no place to die in peace."

In 1967, Wang emphasized the moral and political duty of Taiwan-based citizens to support anti-communist efforts on the mainland, stating:

"All sectors of society in the Republic of China on Taiwan have a responsibility to fully support the anti-communists on the mainland."

She further elaborated in 1969:

"Party reform will lay the foundation for a full-scale counteroffensive. The anti-communist struggle is not merely a military conflict—it is a war over the way of life for all humanity. This war extends to every aspect of daily life, to every corner of society."

During the period of Taiwan's democratization, she strongly opposed both the re-election and the mandatory retirement of the First Legislative Yuan members. When faced with public criticism and ridicule regarding their age, Wang famously responded, "On the road to the underworld, there are both young and old; who will die first, no one can say." Her defiant remark heightened generational tensions within the Legislative Yuan and symbolized the broader resistance of the old guard to political reforms.
