= 11th Division (National Revolutionary Army) =

Chinese National Revolutionary Army division

The 11th Division was a crack division of the Chinese National Revolutionary Army and part of the Chinese troops trained by the Germans. For a time known as the 18th Army, it served with distinction during the Second Sino-Japanese War. Being one of the five elite units of Chiang Kai-shek's Whampoa clique, the division ceased to exist after sustaining heavy casualties against the Communists in the Chinese Civil War.

== Central Plains War ==
In 1931, the 11th Division took part in the Central Plains War, fighting fiercely against Yan Xishan's and Feng Yuxiang's troops at Eastern Henan, Southern Shandong, and the Beiping-Hankou line. The division suffered a total of 9,007 casualties in these campaign, but only 6,205 casualties could be identified down to the ranks of the officers and soldiers, including 1,268 killed, 4,571 wounded, and 366 missing. A large number of casualties could not be identified. For example, in the fighting at Eastern Henan, the 61st and 63rd Regiments suffered more than 3,000 killed, wounded, or missing but only 194 killed from the two regiments and 265 wounded from the 61st Regiment could be identified by the men’s ranks. In addition, 184 officers and soldiers of the division were identified to have been killed in action fighting against Tang Shengzhi's and Feng Yuxiang's troops. The total casualties of the 11th Division in the Central Plains War reached more than 10,000 including at least more than 1,000 killed.

== Second Sino-Japanese War ==
=== Battle of Shanghai ===
On August 9, 1937, the 11th Division was ordered to march to North China in response to the Japanese Army's southward offensive. However, just before reaching Baoding, the division was redirected to participate in the Battle of Shanghai. On the 23rd of August, the Japanese Army landed at Wusong and Chuansha and occupied Luodian, a crucial hub where several highways connecting Baoshan, Shanghai, Jiading, and Songjiang intersected. In response, the 15th Group Army ordered the 33rd Brigade of the 11th Division to attack Luodian. Within a few hours, the Chinese division had defeated an engineer unit and recaptured Luodian, capturing three Japanese troops and obtaining maps from the body of the enemy captain which revealed the Japanese landing sites and confirmed the enemy in the Luodian direction as elements of the Japanese 11th Division. Fierce fighting for Luodian continued until its fall on the 28th of August.

On August 29, 1937, Luo Zhuoying, commander of the 15th Group Army, ordered his troops to launch a counterattack to recapture Luodian. The 11th Division committed its reserve force and captured a Western-style house on the south side of Luodian. This stronghold was later known as the "white house", which the 1st Battalion of the 65th Regiment would defend for nearly a month against the Japanese 44th Infantry Regiment. On August 30, as a result of heavy casualties and repeated setbacks, Luo Zhuoying ordered a brief stop to the offensive to secure defensive lines. Japanese attacks on the 31st of August and 1 September resulted in the postponement of the offensive until the 2nd. The 11th Division was to be the main attacking force with support from the 14th Division. However, due to heavy casualties from previous battles, the 11th Division could only spare one regiment for the attack. Another counter-offensive was ordered on September 4, but the Chinese Army was unable to break through Japanese defenses at Luodian. On the 7th, Luo Zhuoying finally ordered a stop to the attacks. In the two-week combat for Luodian, the 11th Division suffered more than 2,120 casualties including four battalion commanders killed in action.

After the failed counterattack at Luodian, the 11th Division was engaged in defensive actions. On September 20, the position of the 33rd Brigade southeast of Luodian was bombarded by Japanese artillery and brigade commander Wang Yan was wounded. On the 23rd, the 11th Division was driven out of the "white house". On October 5, the Japanese Army launched simultaneous attacks at the 11th and 67th Divisions, breaking through their positions. Lei Hanchi's battalion of the 11th Division defending Xuzhai was completely wiped out. The two Chinese divisions were ordered to withdraw to the rear for reorganization.

On October 24, the 11th and 14th Divisions returned to the front-line and began constructing defensive positions. On October 27, the rear of the 62nd Regiment was cut off by the enemy and the unit was caught in desperate battle as it was surrounded from three sides. The regiment broke out of the encirclement at night with very heavy casualties. The 66th Regiment also suffered heavy losses as it was relentless attacked for the whole day. Regimental commander Cao Jinlun, regimental attaché Xie Jinhua, and battalion commanders Li Peidian and Tao Jiangang were all wounded and battalion commander Zhang Fengyi was killed. On November 5, the Japanese Army landed at Hangzhou Bay. The Chinese Army failed to stop their advance and gradually withdrew from the Shanghai battlefield.

On November 13, the retreating Chinese Army was deployed into multiple defensive positions across the Wufu Line. Among them, the 11th, 67th, and 13th Divisions were ordered to defend Changshu as the second defensive line of the 15th Group Army. On November 15, the Japanese Army launched its offensive against the first defensive line of the 15th Group Army. The 11th Division was ordered to reinforce the front-line positions on the November 16. By the time the 11th Division arrived at the battlefield on the 18th, the enemy had stormed Yushan. The 15th Group Army hastily ordered the 31st Brigade of the 11th Division, the 32nd Division, a regiment of the 60th Division, the 228th Brigade of the 76th Division, and the 34th Separate Brigade to counterattack Yushan on the 19th. Despite some initial claimed success, the attack ultimately failed. On the same day, a Japanese regiment landed west of Kuncheng Lake and engaged with one company of the 13th Division and one regiment of the 11th Division.

By the 20th of November, the 15th and 21st Group Armies had completely abandoned the Wufu line. The 11th, 14th, 67th, 98th, 13th, and 40th Divisions of the 15th Group Army retreating from Changshu were ordered to move to Yixing. The 11th, 13th, 60th, and 98th Divisions provided cover for the retreat. On December 3, the 11th Division withdrew to She County for reorganization. In its three months of combat, the twelve-battalion strong division received four batches of reinforcements and suffered casualties amounting to eighteen battalion commanders, most of the company and platoon commanders, and countless NCOs and soldiers.

=== Later battles ===
On July 5, 1938, the 11th Division was temporarily put under the command of the 34th Corps and participated in the battles of Hukou and Pengze as part of the Battle of Wuhan. On July 9, the 31st Brigade of the 11th Division captured enemy positions at Tangshan and Yangjiashan and repelled a counterattack from the 136th Infantry Brigade and the 2nd Regiment of the Hata Task Force. The division reported the capture of two Japanese soldiers, more than sixty rifles, and more than thirty horses. From the 16th until the 19th of July, the 11th Division participated in the counterattack at Pengze against the 106th Division, claiming the capture of six machine guns and more than forty rifles while suffering more than 700 casualties in the process. On August 27, 1938, the 18th Army was ordered to assemble to Fengjiapu to support the 30th Group Army fighting in the battlefield south of Ruichang. The 11th Division finished its deployment on September 2 and fought with the enemy along the Ruichang-Wuning Road for half a month. In this engagement, the 11th Division suffered 1,372 casualties. Including casualties in south Anhui in May, the 11th Division lost as many as 213 officers killed, wounded, or missing in 1938.

In June 1940, the 18th Army participated in the Battle of Zaoyang-Yichang and suffered 10,959 casualties. Among its units, the 11th Division originally participated in the battle with 10,041 troops and was left with eight infantry companies and three machine gun companies. The 18th Division had less than 3,000 troops and laborers left and the 199th Division was reorganized into one regiment. The whole army was reduced to three regiments. In May 1943, the 18th Army participated in the Battle of West Hubei, during which the 11th Division suffered 630 casualties. In November of the same year, the division participated in the Battle of Changde and suffered 621 casualties. In April 1945, the 11th Division participated in the Battle of West Hunan and, alongside other units of the Fourth Front Army, nearly wiped out the Japanese 109th Infantry Regiment. The division suffered 792 casualties in this engagement.

== See also ==
- New 1st Army
- 88th Division (National Revolutionary Army)
