= Reorganization Group =

Left-wing Kuomintang faction (1928–31)

Reorganization Group 中國國民黨改組同志會
- Leader: Wang Jingwei (disputed); Chen Gongbo; Ku Meng-yu
- Founded: November 1928
- Dissolved: January 1, 1931
- Split from: Kuomintang (Wuhan)
- Ideology: Three Principles of the People; Mínshēng; Wang Jingwei Thought; Anti-communism; Anti-imperialism; Anti–Hu Hanmin; Anti–Chiang Kai-shek
- Political position: Left-wing

A publication of the reorganization faction of the Chinese Kuomintang in the 1920s

The Reorganization Group (Chinese: 改組派; pinyin: Gǎizǔ Pài; Wade–Giles: Kai^{3}tsu^{3} Pʻai^{4}) or Reorganization Comrades Association (Chinese: 中國國民黨改組同志會; pinyin: Zhōngguó Guómíndǎng Gǎizǔ Tóngzhì Huì; Wade–Giles: Chung^{1}kuo^{2} Kuo^{2}min^{2}tang^{3} Kai^{3}tsu^{3} Tʻung^{2}chih^{4} Hui^{4}) was a left-wing political faction within Kuomintang that opposed the Hu Hanmin ("Western Hills Group") and Chiang Kai-shek from the late 1920s to the early 1930s. Wang Jingwei himself did not officially participate in the Reorganization Group, but the group considered Wang its spiritual leader.

== Foundation and Ideology ==
The Reorganization Faction (改組派) emerged within the Kuomintang (KMT) during the late 1920s as a response to internal party conflicts and disillusionment with Chiang Kai-shek's leadership following the Northern Expedition. Formally known as the Chinese Kuomintang Reorganization Comrades Association (中國國民黨改組同志會), the group was primarily led by left-leaning politicians, including Chen Gongbo, Ku Meng-yu, and Wang Jingwei, the latter of whom was regarded as the faction's spiritual leader, despite his lack of formal endorsement of the group.

The faction originated in the political climate following the 1928 Second Plenary Session of the KMT's Second Central Executive Committee, in which the Wang Jingwei-led group suffered a significant defeat in its power struggle with Chiang. In the wake of this loss, Chen Gongbo and Ku Meng-yu began publishing two ideological journals, Revolutionary Review (《革命評論》) and Advance (《前進》), from Shanghai in mid-1928. These publications called for a reorganization of the KMT along bourgeois reformist lines and served as platforms to critique Chiang's centralization of power.

Though the term "Reorganization Faction" appeared as early as July 1928, the group was not formally institutionalized until later that year, in the winter of 1928. Contrary to later assumptions, the faction did not draft an entirely new political platform at its inception. Instead, its ideological foundation was shaped largely by Chen Gongbo's call to "reorganize the Kuomintang," supplemented by the input of other left-wing members such as Wang Jingwei and Ku Meng-yu. Chen ultimately authored the group's basic ideological statement after collective deliberation among its core members.

By early 1929, the Reorganization Faction had gained considerable traction and became the largest intellectual and anti-Chiang political bloc within the KMT. Its rapid rise in influence drew attention from both the Nanjing government and the Chinese Communist Party, and it was not until June 1929—when Chiang Kai-shek publicly condemned the group—that it became widely known to the general public.

The faction is often seen as the main opposition bloc within the early Nationalist Government, and its emphasis on intellectual critique, reformist politics, and anti-authoritarianism marked it as a key player in intra-party debates during the Republican era.

== Notable persons ==
- Chen Bijun
- Chen Gongbo
- Chen Shuren
- Chou Te-wei
- Chu Minyi
- He Xiangning
- Ku Cheng-kang
- Ku Cheng-ting
- Ku Meng-yu
- Serengdongrub
- Shi Cuntong
- Wang Jingwei
- Xu Deheng
- Xue Yue

== See also ==
- Tsotanhui Clique
- CC Clique
