= Yuan Shouqian =

Chinese politician (1904–1992)

General Yuan Shouqian (Chinese: 袁守謙; pinyin: Yuán Shǒuqiān) (1904–1992) was a prominent Chinese and Taiwanese politician from Changsha, Hunan. He was awarded "Superior General Second Class" in Taiwan.

He was the eldest son of the Yuan family. His youngest sister, Yuan Shihui (Chinese: 袁詩惠), later married Chen Zhike (Chinese: 陳志恪).

Under the recommendation of Tan Yankai, who was also from Hunan, Yuan Shouqian applied for the Whampoa Military Academy and became one of its first graduating class members.

Yuan Shouqian served many important posts for the Central Government of the Republic of China, including Deputy Minister of National Defense (1950), and Minister of Transportation (1954).

He died of cancer in Taipei, Taiwan in 1992.

== See also ==
- Ministry of Transportation and Communications (Republic of China)
