= 1934 Khamba rebellion =

Date	1934
Location	Kham (Tibet province)
Result	Rebellion aborted

Belligerents
Khamba rebels led by the Pandatsang family	Tibet (1912–1951)

Commanders and leaders
Pandastang Togbye; Pandatsang Rapga	Regent of Tibet

Strength
Khamba tribesmen	(Tibet) Tibetan Army

The 1934 Khamba rebellion was a rebellion in the western regions of Kham in Tibet against the Tibetan Government. It consisted of Khamba tribesmen led by the Pandatsang family; two brothers of the family, Pandatsang Tobgyal and Pandatsang Ragpa, led the revolt.

== Revolt ==
The Pandatsang were an extremely rich Khampa trading family with enormous influence in Kham. The family leader was Nyigyal. The family's servants often said "Sa spang mda' gnam spang mda'." "The earth is Pangda's, the sky is Pangda's." and "I am connected to Pangda, what are you going to do to me?". They were behind the rebellion against Lhasa in 1934 and the Tibet Improvement Party.

The mastermind of the rebellion was Pandastang Togbye of the rich and powerful Kham Pandatsang family.

Pandatsang Rapga was the brother of Pandatsang Togbye (also spelled Topgyay), who was a great friend of Thubten Kunphela who was from Nyemo county located between Shigatse and Lhasa, U-Tsang. Partly out of anger over Kunphela's fall from power after the death of the 13th Dalai Lama, Thubten Gyatso, in 1934 Togbye organized a revolt against the Tibetan government in the areas they controlled in the western part of Kham. (that was about one third of the whole Kham region). His brother had military control while Rapga was more of a "scholar". They aimed to ultimately attack Lhasa, and had to take Chamdo first.

He did so in the belief that many monks from Kham originating in the large monasteries near Lhasa would support him in this. The Tibetan government knew that the rebellion originated from within Kham. The residence of his family in Lhasa was confiscated, but ultimately negotiations ensued. The reason was that the family was the main exporter of Tibetan wool abroad, and any further incident could affect government funds. As a result of the outcome of the negotiations, the members of the family did not persecute the rebellion further.

While the Kham rebels were escaping from the Tibetan government forces, they were forced into battle against both the Sichuan warlord Liu Wenhui and the Chinese Communist Party forces which were on the Long March.

Rapga fled from Kham to Kalimpong via Kanting and Nanking after the revolt failed.

Gray Tuttle, Leila Hadley Luce Professor of Modern Tibetan Studies, believes that it was possible that Rapga "was a devout believer in the political ideology of Sun Yat-sen and had translated some of Sun's more important writings into Tibetan" during this rebellion.
