= Western Hills Group =

Western Hills Group 西山會議派
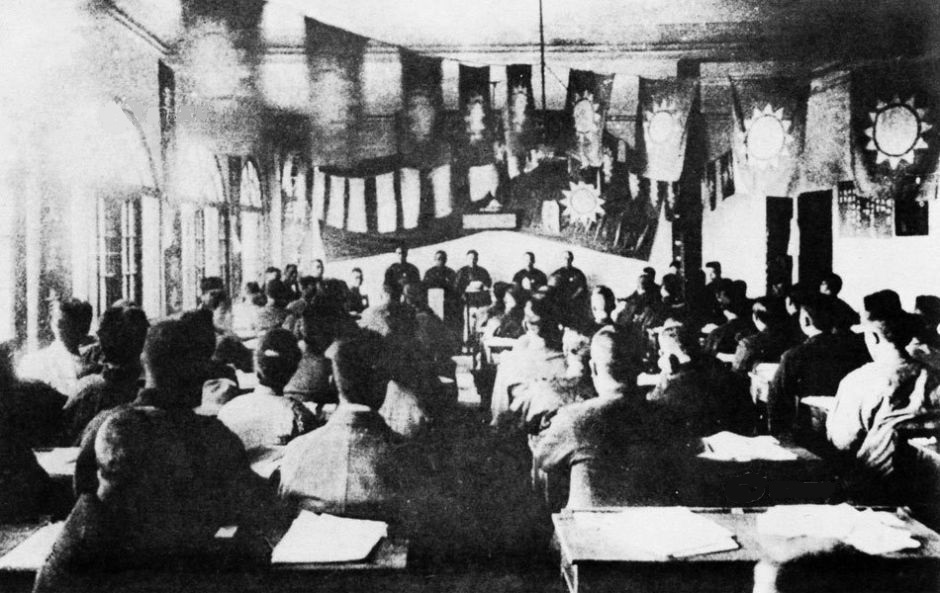
- Leader: Lin Sen
- Founded: November 23, 1925
- Dissolved: December 15, 1931
- Split from: Kuomintang
- Ideology: Three Principles of the People; Conservatism (Chinese); Hu Hanmin Thought; Dai Jitao Thought; Anti-communism; Anti–Chiang Kai-shek; Anti–Wang Jingwei
- Political position: Right-wing to far-right
- Religion: Chinese Buddhism

The Western Hills Group (Chinese: 西山會議派; pinyin: Xīshān Huìyì Pài; Wade–Giles: Hsi¹shan¹ Hui⁴i⁴ Pʻai⁴) or Western Hills Conference was a right-wing conservative faction of the Chinese Nationalist Party, or KMT, active in the 1920s. The faction was formed at a meeting of KMT leaders opposed to communist influence held at Biyun Temple in the Western Hills district of Beijing in November 1925. About half the KMT leadership attended the meeting. The group included Lin Sen, Ju Zheng, Zou Lu, and Xie Chi. In the three-way struggle for party leadership that followed the death of Sun Yat-sen, the group supported Hu Hanmin against leftist Wang Jingwei ("Reorganization Group") and centrist Chiang Kai-shek.

== Political position ==
The Western Hills Group is often labeled "extreme right-wing" or "far-right". The group followed Hu Hanmin and Dai Jitao Thought, and opposed communism, Wang Jingwei, and Chiang Kai-shek Thought.

Unlike the Christian Sun Yat-sen, the Western Hills group had a prominent Buddhist character. The initial intention of the Western Hills Group was not political, but only to visit the Biyun Temple, where the coffin of Sun Yat-sen was situated, to recite Buddhist sutras and pray for Buddha's return. Most of the main attendees of the Western Hills Group were Buddhist and Taoist priests with profound Buddhist education, including Lin Sen, Juzheng, Zou Lu, Ye Chucheng, Zhang Ji, Dai Jitao, Xie Zhi, Qin Zhen, Shen Dingyi, Mao Zuquan, Zhang Ziben, Fu Rulin, Shi Ying, and Shi Qingyang, among others, and there were 14 of them.

== History ==
The Nationalist Party had won a nationwide parliamentary election held in 1912. Lin Sen was selected Speaker in April 1913. In July, parliamentary government collapsed and the KMT leaders went into exile. Under Soviet sponsorship, the KMT and the Communist Party formed a "united front" in 1923. This agreement allowed the KMT to receive Soviet arms and establish a foothold in Guangzhou, a major city in southern China. The KMT and the communists were thus allies against the Beiyang warlords, who were backed by the Japanese.

After the death of Sun in March 1925, the KMT swung to the left under Wang, who formed an alliance with the communists. Right-wing favorite Hu Hanmin was pushed out of the leadership and sent to the Soviet Union in August. The Western Hills Conference held on November 23 included fifteen KMT leaders. The group billed itself as the "Fourth CEC Plenum." That is to say, it claimed to be acting as the KMT's executive committee. The group's first act was to pass a "Manifesto to Strike the Communist Faction from Party Register." On December 2, it passed a resolution to expel the four communist members of the KMT executive committee, as well as the five communist alternate members. (This included Mao Zedong, at this time an alternate member.) On December 4, the group voted to terminate the contract of Soviet agent Mikhail Borodin. On December 5, Wang was expelled from the KMT for a period of six months.

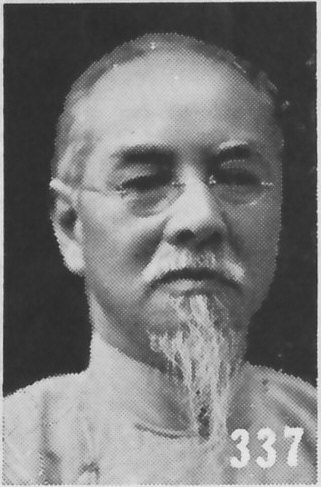
Former parliament Speaker Lin Sen was the best-known member of the Western Hills Group

Wang's supporters did not recognize these decisions. They argued that the meeting in Beijing had failed to achieve a quorum. Under the KMT bylaws, a quorum was fifteen full executive committee members. Only fourteen of the Western Hills attendees were full members.

Lin Sen lent his prestige to the meeting by acting as convener. But otherwise he was detached, refusing even to comment on the resolutions. A "Society to Promote the Study of Sun Wenism," modeled after the KMT's various communist leagues, was created to promote non-communist views among KMT members.

Wang responded to the Western Hills meeting by convening a Second National Party Conference in Guangzhou on 1 January 1926. The resolutions of a party conference overridden those of the executive committee, regardless of the quorum issue. The conference expelled the Western Hills participants from the party. Although the conference was a triumph for Wang and the left, it also provoked a reaction from those concerned about communist influence. Afterward, the Western Hills Group set up a rival KMT headquarters in Shanghai.

The KMT suffered another split in January 1927. Wang's supporters began meeting in Hankou while supporters of military commander Chiang Kai-shek began meeting separately in Nanchang. In March, Chiang's forces captured Shanghai and Nanjing. On April 19, a "National Government" was proclaimed in Nanjing with Hu as party chairman and Chiang as military commander. This government represented a merger of the Shanghai and Nanchang factions. It immediately conducted a purge of communists and their allies.

After intercepting a message from Moscow calling for a coup, Hankou purged its communists on 15 July 1927. In August, the Western Hills Group brokered a reconciliation between the Wang's Hankou-based faction and Chiang's Nanjing-based faction. Chiang resigned his position and took a trip to Japan to facilitate the reconciliation.

With Hu chairman of a reunited KMT and Chiang absent, the Western Hills Group was for a brief interval the party's dominant faction. The field commanders, however, remained the kingmakers. On 6 January 1928, they restored Chiang as commander in chief. Hu, meanwhile, took an extended trip to Europe. In February, Chiang dismissed the Western Hills ministers and appointed the Chen brothers to prominent party organization and security positions. This "CC Clique" of Chen Guofu and Chen Lifu soon eclipsed and absorbed the Western Hills Group. When Hu returned in October, he was appointed president of the Legislative Yuan with Lin Sen as vice president. The Hu-Chiang alliance lasted until February 1931, when Chiang put Hu under house arrest.

Lin Sen served as Chinese president from 1931 to 1943. However, this was a nominal position without influence on policy. As for Ju Zheng, he administered China's court system from 1932 to 1947 as president of the Judicial Yuan.
