= Kyabchen Dedrol =

Tibetan writer

- Born: 16 June 1977 (age 49); Chukhama, Chokho, Maqu, Gannan, Gansu, China
- Citizenship: China
- Occupation: Writer

Kyabchen Dedrol, (born 1977 སྐྱབས་ཆེན་བདེ་གྲོལ། 加布青·德卓), is a Tibetan contemporary writer. Born in Chukhama, Chokho (ཁྲོ་ཁོ་ཆུ་ཁ་མ།), a nomadic community in Amdo in the 1970s, Dedrol is the co-founder and editor in chief of Butter Lamp (མཆོད་མེ་བོད་ཀྱི་རྩོམ་རིག་དྲ་བ།) the first online Tibetan-language literary journal. Dedrol reads world literature extensively through English and Chinese, and has translated numerous short stories, poetry, and technology reviews from English and Chinese into Tibetan language.

Dedrol's poems have been reviewed and translated into English, Chinese and other languages.

Kyabchen Dedrol is known for being a member of the third generation of Tibetan poets. Dedrol's poem, for example, "My Poetry", despite his divergent writings styles, it is namely a triumphant description of the virtues of one's own poetry. This boastful show is reminiscent of the traditional “genre” of scholarly pride (mkhas pa’i nga rgyal མཁས་པའི་ང་རྒྱལ།) in which scholars would boast of their learning and knowledge. One might expect there to be a slight air of arrogance associated with this display of superiority, however, only a scholar among scholars who possesses learning and humility (the two qualities traditionally associated with master scholars) in legendary proportions would ever consider making such a statement. In the Anthology of Classical Literature (Legs rtsom snying bsdus ལེགས་རྩོམ་སྙིང་བསྡུས། ) there is a section devoted to scholarly pride which features quotes from the Buddha Shakyamuni himself, the glorious Dharmakirti, the omniscient Longchen Rabjampa, the master scholar Sakya Pandita, Lord Tsongkhapa, and Tibetans' favorite Gendun Chophel, among other Indian and Tibetan scholars. They all propound their virtues and wisdom in a way that does not leave the reader feeling that they are conceited but, instead convinced that they live up to their claims.

== Works ==
- 1994 Poetry collection, The Dances of Golden Fish (Tibetan: ༡༩༩༤ལོར་སྙན་དེབ། གསེར་ཉའི་འཁྱུག་འགྲོས།)
- 1998 Poetry collection, The Unfree Place, and its Host (Tibetan: ༡༩༩༨ལོར་སྙན་དེབ། མི་ཁོམ་པའི་གནས་དང་དེའི་བདག་པོ།)
- 2008 Short story collection, The Songs of Gray Melody (Tibetan: ༢༠༠༨ལོར་བརྩམས་སྒྲུང་དེབ། གླུ་སྐད་སྐྱ་བོ།)
- 2011 Translation, The Courageous Youth (Tibetan: ༢༠༡༡ལོར་འགྱུར་དེབ། དཔའ་བའི་གདེང་དང་ལྡན་པའི་ལང་ཚོ།)
- 2012 Poetry collection, Impermanence (Tibetan: ༢༠༡༢ལོར་སྙན་དེབ། མི་རྟག་པ།)
- 2018 Essay collection, The Notes of Life (Tibetan: ༢༠༡༨ལོར་ལྷུག་རྩོམ་དེབ། འཚོ་བའི་ཟིན་བྲིས།)
- 2019 Poetry collection, The Barkor Bar (Tibetan: ༢༠༡༩ལོར་སྙན་དེབ། བར་སྐོར་གྱི་ཆང་ཁང་།)
- Since 2019, Co-edited Tibetan language journal World Literature (Tibetan: ༢༠༡༩ལོ་ནས་བཟུང་ལྡོང་བུ་ལྷན་དུ་རྩོམ་སྒྲིག་པ་གཙོ་བོ་བྱས་པའི་དུས་དེབ། འཛམ་གླིང་རྩོམ་རིག)
- 2019 Novel, The Cemetery, Snow-mountain, and the Vultures of Shambala (Tibetan: ༢༠༡༩ལོར་སྒྲུང་རིང་དེབ། གངས་འདབས་ཀྱི་དུད་ཁྲོད་དང་ཤམ་བྷ་ལའི་བྱ་རྒོད།)
- 2021 Novella, The Itching, (Tibetan: ༢༠༢༡ ལོར་སྒྲུང་འབྲིང་དེབ། ཟ་འཕྲུག)
- 2022 Poetry collection, The Barkor Bar (Chinese edition), (simplified Chinese: 2022《八廓酒馆》（汉文版）; traditional Chinese: 2022 《八廓酒館》（漢文）)
