= Rapga =

Rapga may refer to

People

- Pandatsang Rapga

RAPGA may refer to:

- Relevant Alleles Preserving Genetic Algorithm
