= Thubten Kunphela =

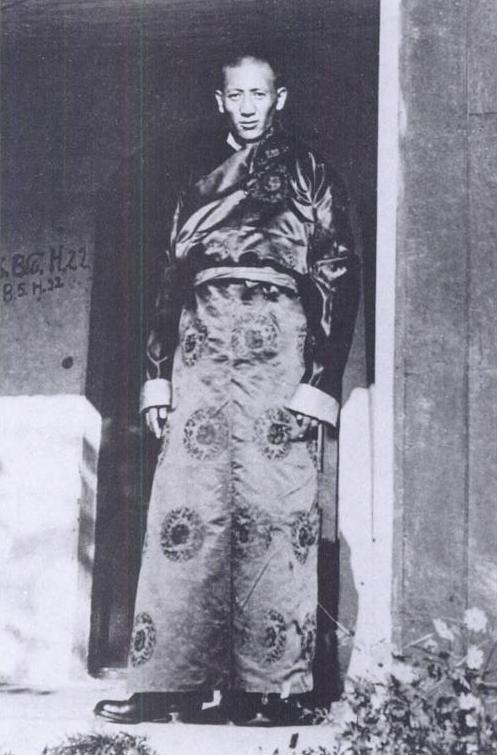
Kunphela in Kalimpong

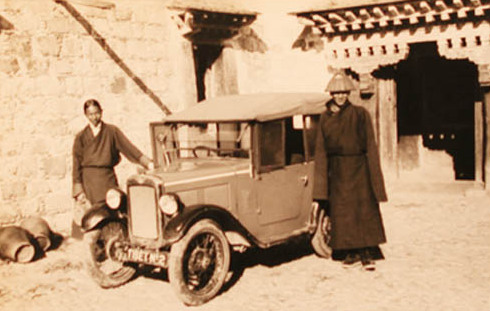
Kunphela and Tashi Dhondup with Baby Austin at Dekyi-Lingka (the British Residence) in 1933 Lhasa

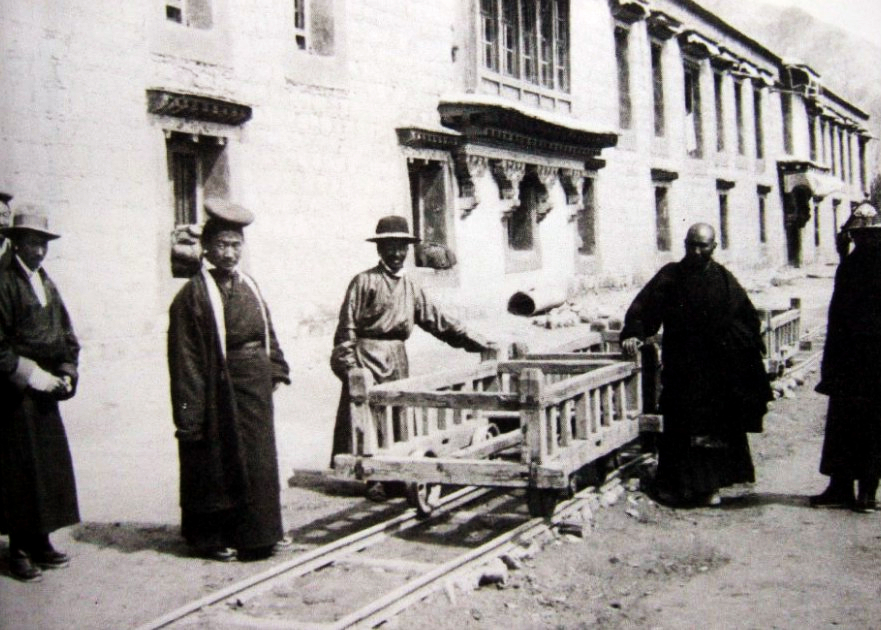
The Tibetan coin mint Drapshi Lekhung photographed by Frederick Williamson on August 31, 1933, the official Kunphel is on the extreme right. He was responsible for the modernization of the Tibetan National Mint.

Thubten Kunphel (Tibetan: ཐུབ་བསྟན་ཀུན་འཕེལ, Wylie: thub bstan kun vphel, 1905 – 1963), commonly known as Kunphela (ཀུན་འཕེལ་ལགས), was a Tibetan politician and one of the most powerful political figures in Tibet during the later years of the 13th Dalai Lama's rule, known as the "strong man of Tibet". Kunphela was arrested and exiled after the death of the Dalai Lama in 1933. He later escaped to India and became a co-founder of the India-based Tibet Improvement Party with the aim of establishing a secular government in Tibet. He worked in Nanking after the attempt to start a revolution in Tibet failed, and returned to Tibet in 1948.

== Rise to power ==
Kunphela was born as Dechen Chödrön in a "taxpayer" serf family in Nyemo in 1905. At the age of 12, he was sent to Lhasa as a servant in the palace of the 13th Dalai Lama. His intelligence gained the Dalai Lama's attention, and subsequently he became a household servant, and then the favorite personal attendant, known as jensey. In the 1920s, he oversaw a series of construction tasks including the renovation of the Potala Palace and the expansion of Norbulingka. In 1931, he became the head of Trapchi Electrical Machine Office, in charge of several mints and munition factories that were considered the most modern ones of Tibet at the time.

In 1932, he successfully persuaded the Dalai Lama to allow him to establish a Trongdra Regiment under his control. The soldiers were recruited from middle-class families, and the equipment and training far exceeded other Tibetan troops.

By 1933, Kunphela had gained the authority of appointing and dismissing government officials. He also controlled the importation and distribution of arms and ammunition. Kunphela issued orders without the need of confirmation of the Kashag or the Dalai Lama, and his orders were obeyed as much as those from the Dalai Lama himself. He was known as the "strong man of Tibet".

== Downfall ==
After the death of the 13th Dalai Lama in December 1933, Kunphela's status became unclear. Initially, Kunphela was confident of his position because of his control of the Trongdra Regiment. He held the power to organize the construction of the Dalai Lama's tomb, and a large part of lay officials present in the National Assembly, composing of government officials and abbots of key monasteries, supported him to become regent even though the position was traditionally for an incarnate lama.

In the meanwhile, Lungshar, one of the parties vying for control after the 13th Dalai Lama's death, conspired to accuse Kunphela of playing a role in the sudden death of the Dalai Lama, and gathered the support of a large number of abbots and monks. The charge was also given support by several Lungshar's friends in the Kashag, who confirmed that only Kunphela accompanied the Dalai Lama all the time. In the meanwhile, Lungshar took advantage of the Trongdra soldiers' dissatisfaction and successfully persuaded them to mutiny. On the third day after death of the Dalai Lama, the entire regiment demonstrated before the Norbulingka and demanded its own disbandment. The regiment was then disbanded on the Kashag's order.

After the desertion of the Trongdra Regiment, Kunphela was arrested and confined in the Sharcenchog prison. Lungshar sought to inflict death or mutilation on Kunphela, but the suggestion was opposed by the Assembly. Eventually, Kunphela was only convicted of failing to deliver prompt notification about the Dalai Lama's illness, and sentenced to exile for life to Kongpo. He was banished in public on the second day before the Tibetan New Year, the most inauspicious day of the year. All his property and that of his relatives was confiscated. Kunphela's father was sent back to serve as a serf in Nyemo.

== Founding of Tibet Improvement Party ==
Kunphela fled to India in 1937 together with Canglocen, a well-known poet and ex-official who was exiled because of supporting Lungshar. In Kalimpong, they met Pandatsang Rapga, a Khamba nationalist and intellectual, and started the Tibet Improvement Party in 1939. According to Pandatsang, the primary goals of the party were "liberation of Tibet from the existing tyrannical government," and a political and societal revolution in Tibet for a secular government under the Republic of China.

In 1946, the activities of Gendün Chöphel, a leading figure in the party, were discovered in Tibet. Under pressure from the Tibetan Government, the Government of India placed Kunphela under surveillance after 1946 and deported him to China one year later. At the time, Varanasi University offered him a position as a lecturer which would have allowed him to legally remain in India. Kunphela refused the offer and left for Shanghai in 1947.

== Later life ==
After the deportation, Kunphela lived in poverty in Shanghai and Nanking for a while, but was eventually able to work for the Mongolian and Tibetan Affairs Commission following an invitation.

In 1947, Kunphela discovered that the ex-regent of Tibet, Reting Rinpoche Jamphel Yeshe Gyaltsen was appealing to the Kuomintang government to overthrow the Taktra Government in Tibet. Thubten Sangbo, the Tibetan Government's representative in Nanking, was informed. The news soon reached Lhasa, and led to Reting's arrest. Kunphela was allowed back to Lhasa in 1948, obviously because of his role in the Reting affair. According to Sampho Tenzin Dhondup, Kunphela's motive was a conflict from the time Kunphela worked for Reting's trade company in India: Kunphela made several purchases in Bombay, but was not reimbursed for his loss even though Reting's company was far from short of funds.

In 1952, Kunphela was one of the staff members of the Grain Procurement Bureau, an newly established institution under the Kashag for resolving the problem of grain shortage. In 1956, Kunphela became the deputy director of the Bureau of Geology under the Preparatory Committee for the Tibet Autonomous Region (PCTAR). He attended the 8th anniversary celebrations of China in Beijing, and was received, along with other Tibetan visitors, by Mao Zedong and Zhou Enlai. Kunphela became vice-director of the Executive Office under the General Office of the Preparatory Committee. He died in Lhasa on December 22, 1963, aged 58.
