= Grand Alliance for China's Reunification under the Three Principles of the People =

Pro-Kuomintang organization in Taiwan

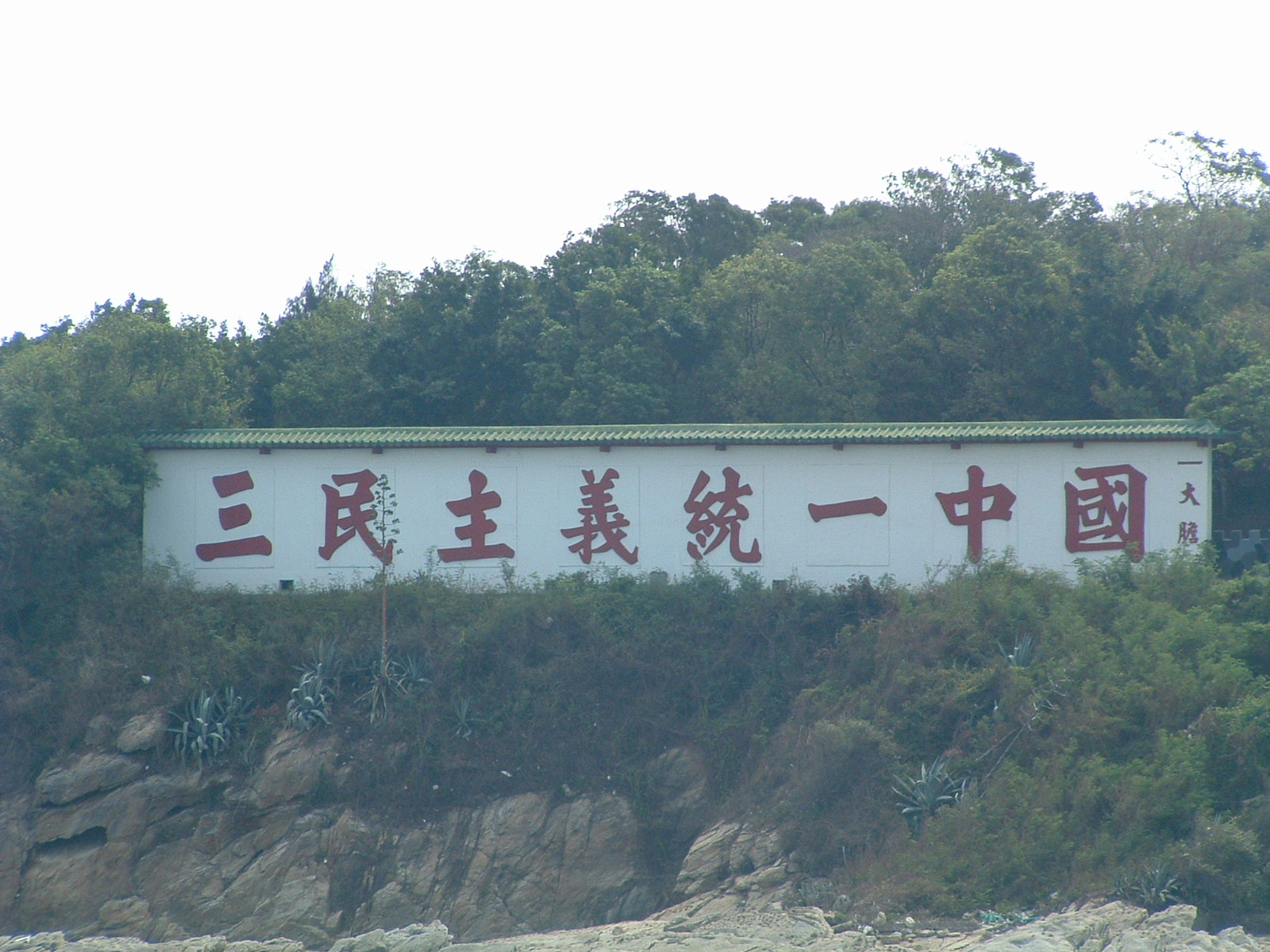
The slogan wall "China's Reunification under the Three Principles of the People" on Dadan Island ordered by Gen. Chao Wan-fu in August 1986, shortly before the 1987 Lieyu massacre, still stands today.

The Grand Alliance for China's Reunification under the Three Principles of the People (Chinese: 三民主義統一中國大同盟) is a pro-Kuomintang political association in the Republic of China (Taiwan), dedicated to the unification of mainland China with Taiwan. The association believes that the unification will take place only on the basis of the Three Principles of the People of Dr. Sun Yat-Sen and a de jure Taiwan should be kept. The association is active in the Republic of China, Canada and the United States.

The association was officially established in 1982 in the Chung-Shan Building of Yangmingshan, Taipei. At the time of its creation 1600 people were present. Among the people there were government officials, religious leaders, educators, entrepreneurs and political refugees from mainland China. The reason for its creation was to centralize pro-unification sentiment and movements of overseas Chinese, scholars, and students into a single body.

The People's Republic of China's China Council for the Promotion of Peaceful National Reunification (Chinese: 中国 和平统一促进会) also promotes the unification of Taiwan with the mainland, but from the perspective of the Chinese Communist Party.
