= Dai Jitao Thought =

Chinese political philosophy within the Kuomintang

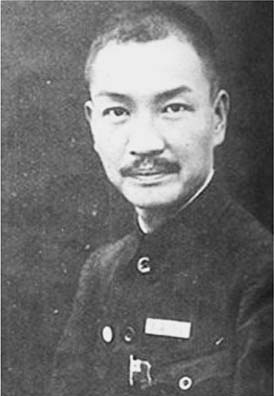
Portrait of Tai Chi-t’ao

Dai Jitao Thought (Chinese: 戴季陶主義; pinyin: Dài Jìtáo zhǔyì; lit. 'Dai Jitaoism') or Dai Jitao Doctrine is the body of political ideas developed by the far-right politician Dai Jitao. It is an ideology based on the interpretation of the Three Principles of the People by some Kuomintang members, including Dai Jitao, since Sun Yat-sen's death in March 1925. Dai Jitao Thought became the ideological foundation of the right-wing Kuomintang, including the Western Hills Group. Dai Jitao himself described it as "Pure Tridemism" (纯粹三民主义; Chúncuì sānmín zhǔyì).

Dai Jitao opposed the left-wing Kuomintang's Marxist interpretation of Sun's concept of "Mínshēng" as a class struggle.

Dai was a Han Chinese nationalist; he identified the ancestors of non-Chinese minorities as ethnic Han and advocated the unity of Zhonghua minzu, and he saw all the people of Qing territory as Chinese people.

Some scholars argue that Dai Jitao Thought fused the content of Buddhist nationalism and conservative nationalism. Dai Jitao and Chiang Kai-shek's Tridemism reflects the characteristics of cultural nationalism and cultural conservatism.

== See also ==
- Anti-communism in China
- Conservatism in China
- Class collaboration
