= Mao Zuquan =

- 茅祖权
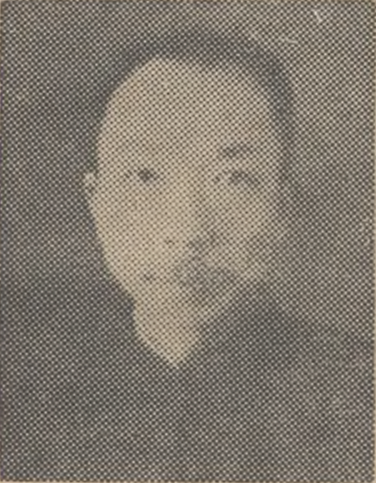
- Official portrait, 1935
- Traditional Chinese: 茅祖權
- Simplified Chinese: 茅祖权

Personal details
- Born: 1883 Haimen, Jiangsu, Qing China
- Died: 1952 (aged 68–69) Shanghai, People's Republic of China
- Party: Kuomintang

Mao Zuquan (Chinese: 茅祖權; 1883–1952) was a Chinese revolutionary, statesman, and legal scholar who played a significant role in the early years of the Republic of China (ROC). A founding member of the Kuomintang (KMT), he was actively involved in the 1911 Xinhai Revolution that led to the overthrow of the Qing dynasty. Throughout his political career, Mao held various political positions, including President of the Administrative Court and Secretary-General of the Judicial Yuan. Following the Chinese Civil War, he remained in mainland China, where he was arrested and later died in prison in 1952 after a hunger strike in opposition to the newly established People's Republic of China.

== Early life ==
Mao was born during the late Qing dynasty in 1883, in the Chinese county of Haimen, Nantong in Jiangsu near Shanghai. Born to a wealthy land-owning family, he was afforded access to strong classical education from an early age, studying in neighboring Empire of Japan during his youth.

== Political career ==
While in Japan, Mao joined the Tongmenghui, which was a secret society and underground resistance movement founded by Sun Yat-sen, Song Jiaoren, and others in Tokyo, with the goal of overthrowing China's imperial Qing dynasty.

The 1911 Xinhai Revolution ended the Manchu-led Qing dynasty, and resulted in the establishment of the Republic of China on January 1, 1912. The revolution marked the end of 2,000 years of imperial rule and the beginning of China's early republican era. In Nanjing, revolutionary armies established a provisional coalition government. During this time, Mao became one of the founding members of the Kuomintang Party of China and served as a delegate to the Kuomintang Central Executive Committee.

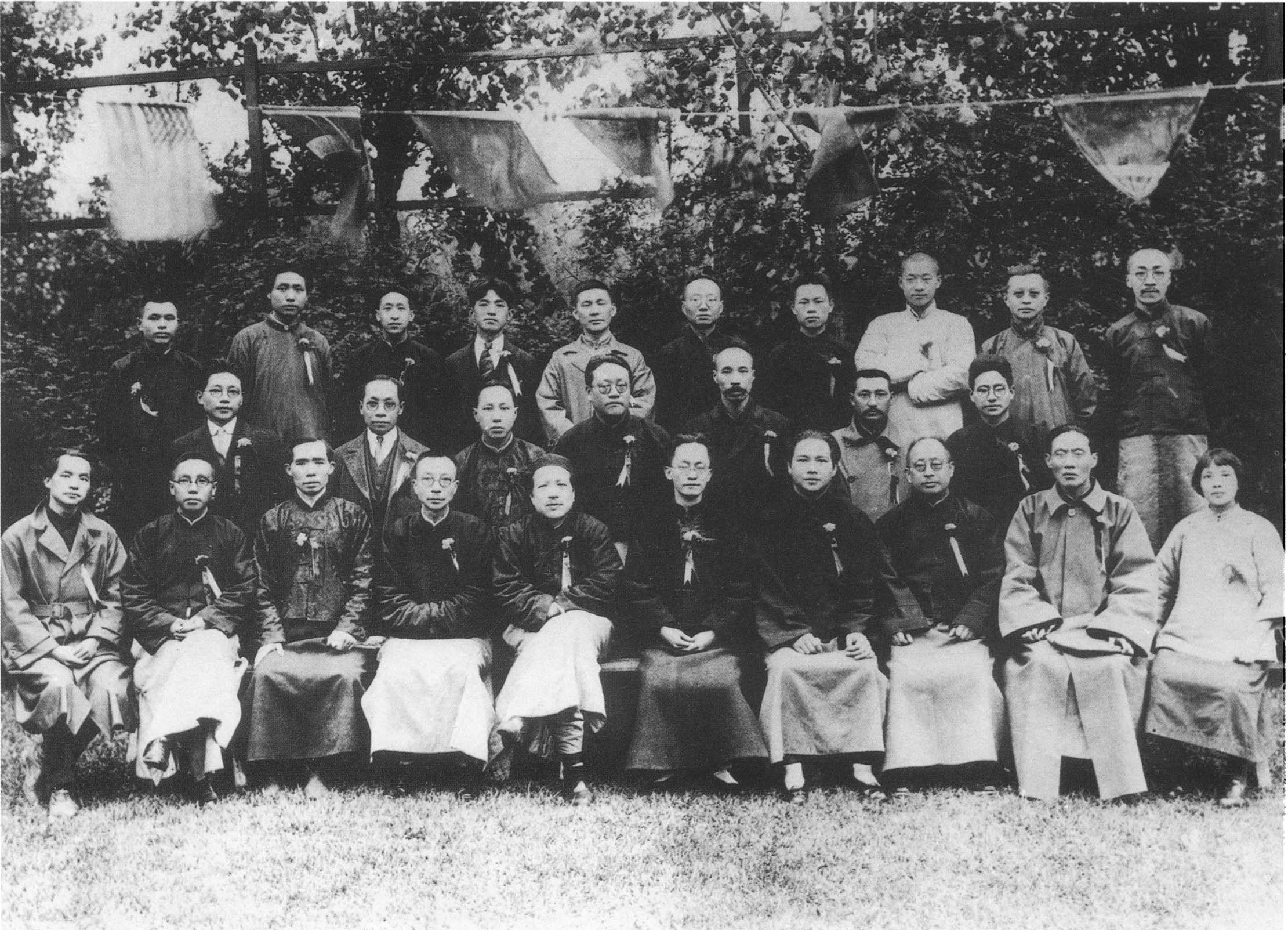
In 1924, a celebration was held to mark the third anniversary of Sun Yat-sen's inauguration. In the front row, fourth from the left, sits Mao Zuquan. Notably, in the back row second from the left, a young Mao Zedong, the future leader of China—can also be seen.

In 1912, Mao was appointed as a member of House of Representatives (眾議院) of the National Assembly of the early Republic, (眾議院) which consisted of several major parliamentary bodies that existed in the Republic of China during the early 1900s. He resumed the seat at the first restoration of the parliament in 1916, served in the Extraordinary Session of Parliament in Guangzhou during the Constitutional Protection Movement in 1917, and served again at the second restoration of the parliament in 1922

He quickly climbed through the ranks and became a prominent individual in the government as well as in Chinese society.

In January 1924, Mao was chosen at the First National Congress of the Kuomintang of China as an alternate executive member of the KMT's Central Committee.

=== Western Hills Conference ===
Between November 23 and December 2, 1925, Mao attended the Western Hills Conference (Chinese: 西山會議派; pinyin: xīshān huìyì pài; Wade–Giles: hsi^{1}shan^{1} hui^{4}i^{4} pʻai^{4}), which was a gathering of select members of the KMT's Central Committee that took place at Biyun Temple in Xishan, Beijing. Convened under the title of the "Fourth Plenary Session of the First Central Committee of the Kuomintang of China," the meeting resulted in several significant decisions. It mandated the expulsion of all Communist Party members from the KMT, and dismissed key figures such as Mao Zedong from their executive or alternate positions within the Central Committee. Mao and the attendees later became known as the "Western Hills Group," a right-wing faction within the Kuomintang.

Mao attended the conference as one of approximately fourteen full and alternate Central Executive Committee members and Central Supervisory Committee members present, alongside Zou Lu, Lin Sen, Ju Zheng, Dai Jitao, Zhang Ji, Xie Chi, and Fu Rulin. Following the conference, the Western Hills Group established a rival Kuomintang central party headquarters in Shanghai in opposition to the party center in Guangzhou. At the Second National Congress of the Kuomintang in January 1926, the party center in Guangzhou passed resolutions censuring the Western Hills participants.

In 1930, during the Central Plains War between Chiang Kai-shek and a coalition of rival Kuomintang factions and regional militarists, Mao joined the anti-Chiang opposition. From 4–7 May 1930, he took part in preparatory talks in Tianjin with Tan Zhen, Zhang Zhiben, Fu Rulin, Chen Gongbo, and others, which reached the preliminary resolutions that led to the convening of the Enlarged Conference of the Kuomintang Central Party Headquarters (中國國民黨中央黨部擴大會議).

When the Enlarged Conference formally opened in Beiping on 7 August 1930 and established a rival national government, Mao served as one of its seven standing committee members, alongside Wang Jingwei, Zhao Daiwen, Xu Chongzhi, Wang Faqin, Xie Chi, and Bai Wenwei.

His party membership, which had been revoked in connection with the Western Hills affair, was restored at the conference.

On 2 September 1930, the Enlarged Conference appointed him to its provisional constitution (約法) drafting committee.

The Enlarged Conference government collapsed after Zhang Xueliang intervened on Chiang’s side in September 1930.

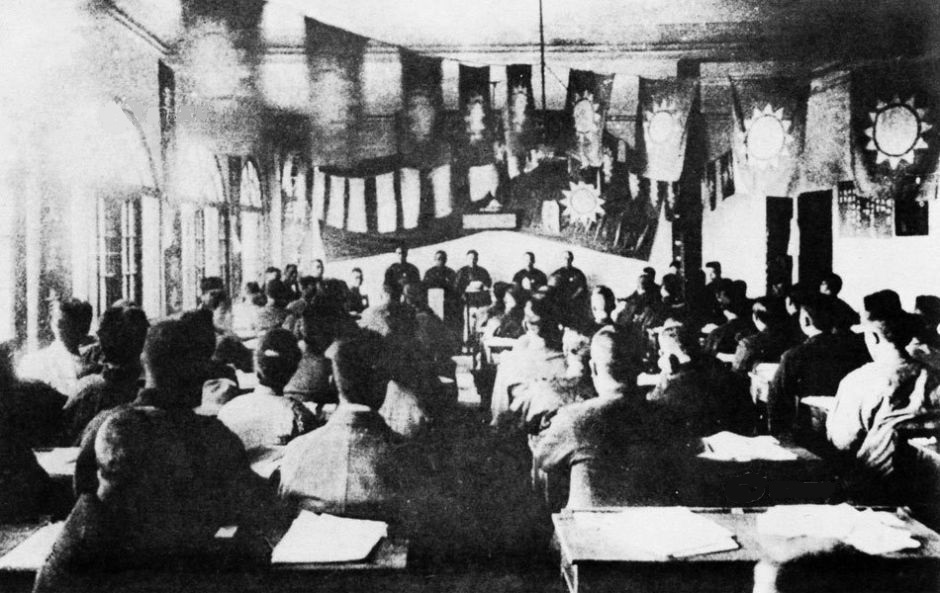
Western Hills Conference in 1925, with Mao in attendance.

=== Political Roles ===
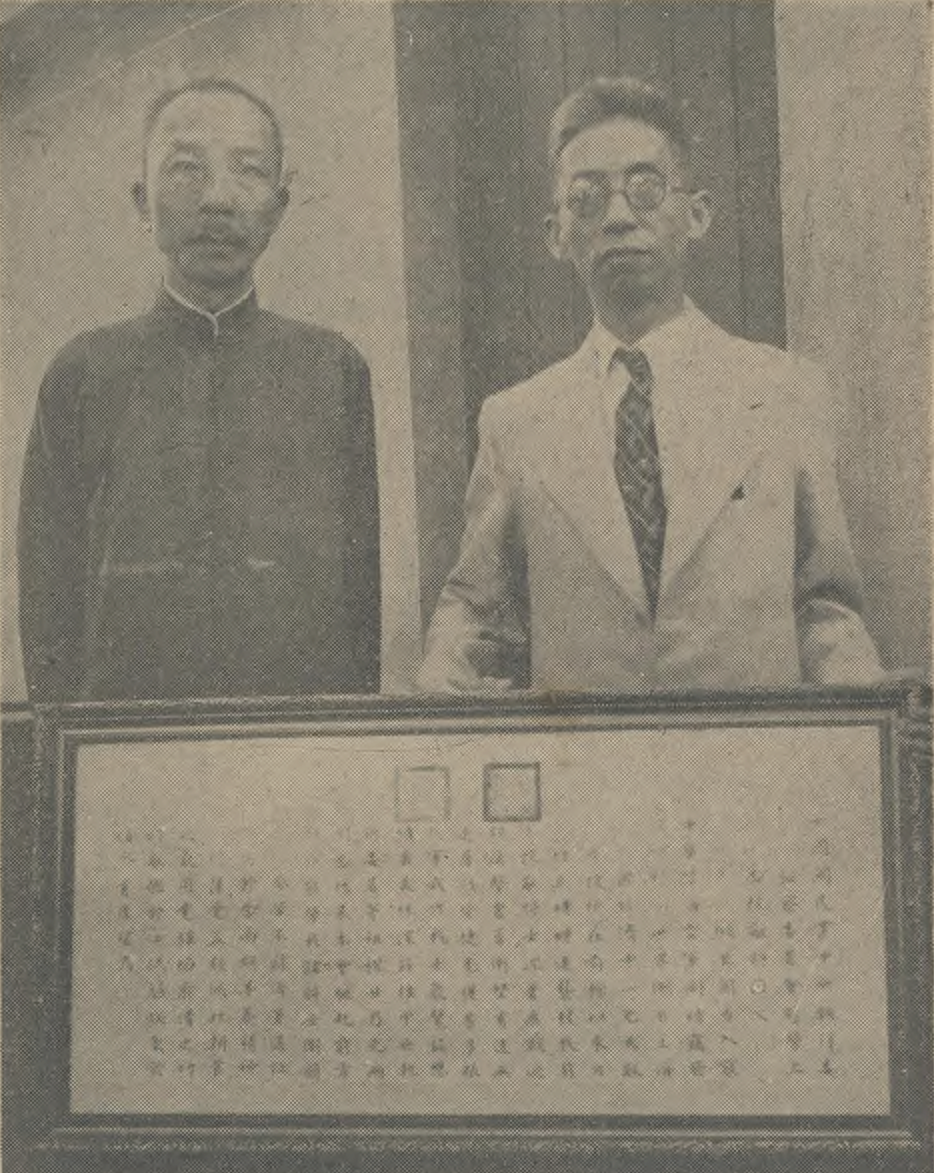
In 1937, the central government of the Republic of China (1912–1949) sent Gan Naiguang (right), a Kuomintang politician, and Mao Zuquan (left) to deliver propaganda and condolences to rally the Chinese troops during the Battle of Shanghai against the Empire of Japan.

In his later years, Mao served a number of positions in the Nationalist Chinese government. From 1927 to 1928, he served as a member of the Jiangsu Provincial Government Committee and as the Director of the Civil Affairs Department. From April 1932 to July 1933, Mao served as a member of the Central Commission for the Disciplinary Sanction of Public Functionaries.

In 1933, he was appointed as the President of the Administrative Court of the Republic of China (1912–1949) and in 1943, he assumed the role of the Secretary-General of the Judicial Yuan of the Republic of China.

His last major role was in 1948, when he served as the National Policy Advisor to the President of the Republic of China, Chiang Kai-shek, who had won 90.03% of the vote in the 1948 Chinese presidential election a few months prior.

== Death ==
When World War II ended, the government of the Republic of China regained control of the island of Taiwan after the surrender of Japan and placed it under martial law.

On the mainland, the civil war between the Kuomintang and the Chinese Communist Party forces, which took a de jure hiatus during the Second Sino-Japanese War, entered its final stage in 1945 following the Japanese surrender. However, it was clear towards the end of the war that the Communists were to gain control of mainland China.

At this time, the majority of Mao's family members were able to evacuate to Taiwan during what is now known as "The Great Retreat", an exodus of the remnants of the Kuomintang-ruled government to the island of Taiwan (Formosa) in December of 1949. The Kuomintang party member and officers and their family, as well as approximately 2 million troops and their family members took part in the retreat, bringing along with it 30 metric tons of gold and the majority of China's cultural artifacts.

Mao was unable to relocate with Chiang Kai-shek and his troops along with the majority of his family. In 1950, he was arrested while in Shanghai and was subsequently imprisoned. During his imprisonment, he was approached by Zhou Enlai, who was then the Premier of China, who offered him a position in the newly established government. However, Mao refused to cooperate. He remained incarcerated for two years until 1952, when he was found dead in his jail cell at the age of 69, having succumbed to a hunger strike. He was subsequently buried in an unmarked mass grave in Shanghai, China.

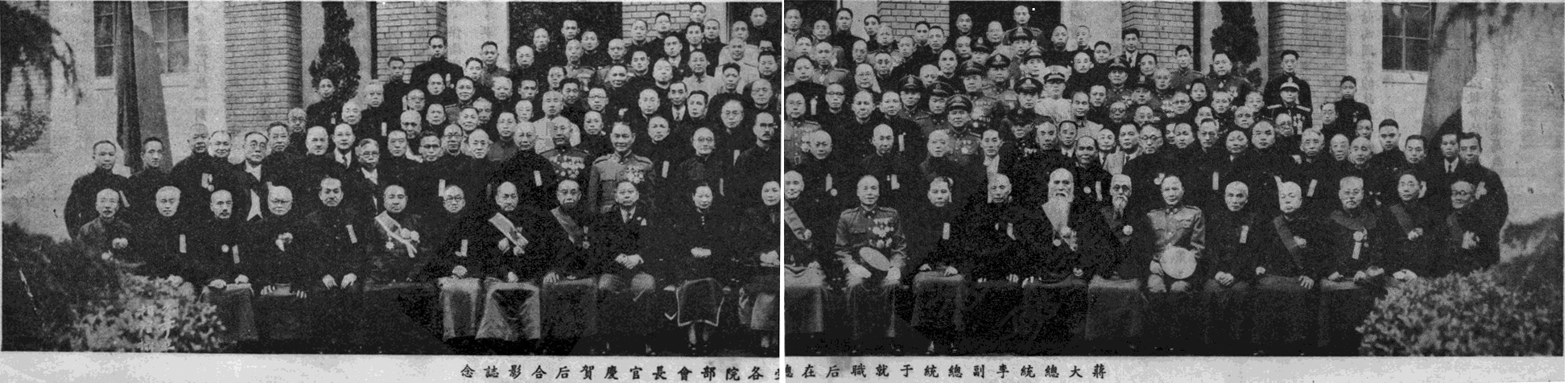
Mao Zuquan's last photo, taken in 1948 with President Chiang Kai-shek and Vice-President Li Zongren near the center of the first row. Mao is first from the left, in the first row. This was a commemorative group photo with officials from various ministries and departments after inauguration celebrations.

== Legacy ==
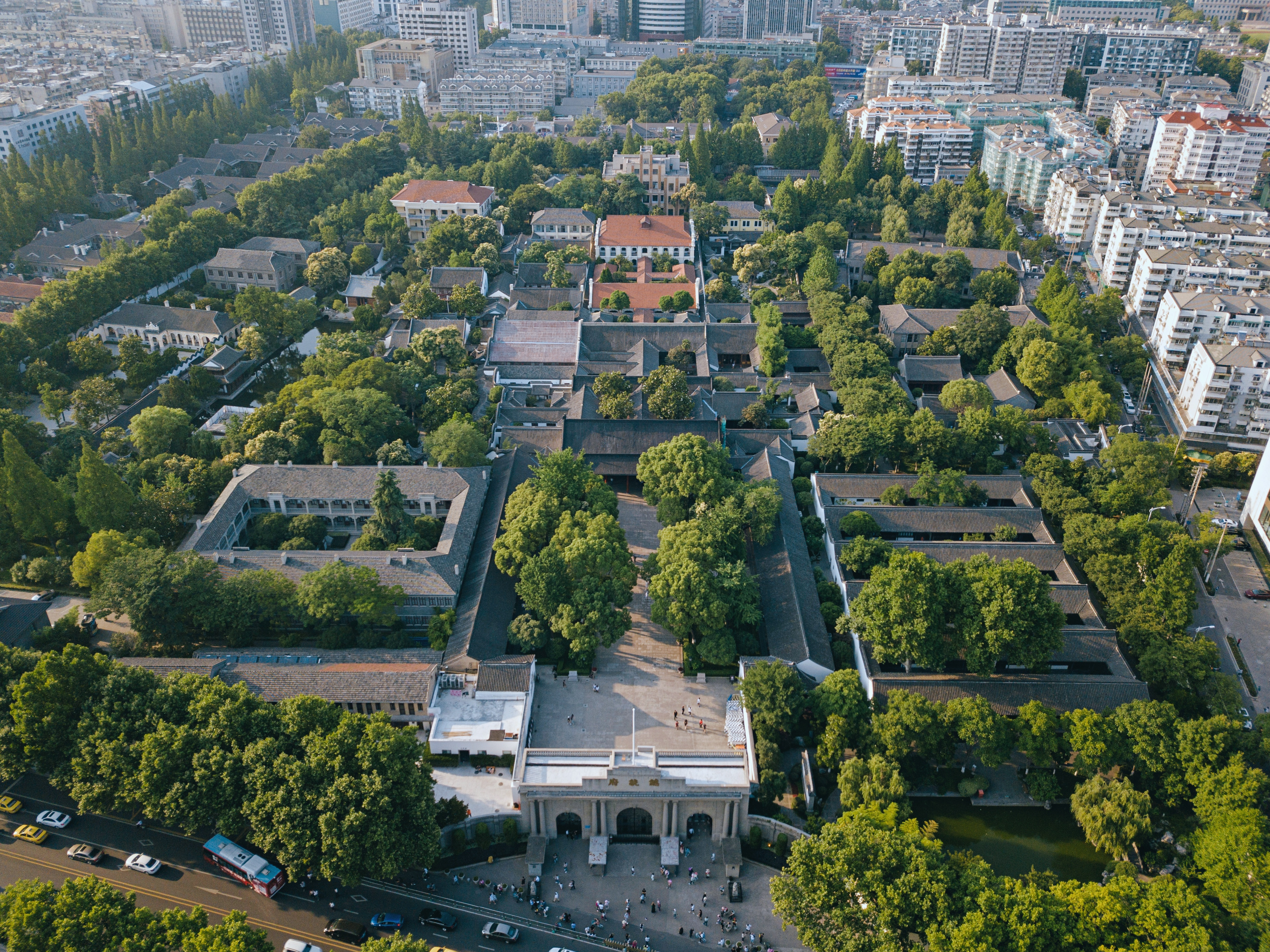
Presidential Palace in Nanjing

Many documents and records of the Nationalist government era and Imperial China were destroyed during the Cultural Revolution from 1966 to 1976. However, such that remains, including various archives of Mao's writings, his political work, as well as his photos and portraits, can be found in the Presidential Palace located in Nanjing, Jiangsu, China, which housed the Office of the President of the Republic of China since 1927 until the capital was relocated to Taipei in 1949. The palace now houses a museum called the China Modern History Museum where Mao's work can be found.

One of Mao's sons later became one of the chief meteorologists at the Civil Air Transport on Taiwan, which was at that time owned by the U.S. Central Intelligence Agency (CIA) and supported United States covert operations throughout East and Southeast Asia during the Cold War. Another one of Mao's sons, Sheng-taur “S.T.” Mau (茅声焘), was a distinguished civil engineering scholar and educator, and former dean of engineering at both New Jersey Institute of Technology and at California State University, Northridge before his death in 2024.

Mao's descendants now reside in Taiwan, China, as well as the United States.
