= Pandatsang Rapga =

Tibetan politician (1902–1974)

Chinese name
- Traditional Chinese: 邦達昌·饒嘎
Transcriptions
Standard Mandarin
- Hanyu Pinyin: bāngdáchāng ráogá

Alternative Chinese name
- Traditional Chinese: 邦達饒幹
Transcriptions
Standard Mandarin
- Hanyu Pinyin: bāngdáráogàn

Second alternative Chinese name
- Traditional Chinese: 邦達饒嘎
Transcriptions
Standard Mandarin
- Hanyu Pinyin: bāngdáráogá

Tibetan name
- Tibetan: སྤོམ་མདའ་ཚང་རབ་དགའ་
Transcriptions
- Wylie: spom mda' tshang rab dga

Pandatsang Rapga (Tibetan: སྤོམ་མདའ་ཚང་རབ་དགའ་, Wylie: spom mda' tshang rab dga; 1902–1974) was a Khampa revolutionary during the first half of the 20th century in Tibet. He was pro-Kuomintang and pro-Republic of China, anti-feudal, anti-communist. He believed in overthrowing the Dalai Lama's feudal regime and driving British imperialism out of Tibet, and acted on behalf of Chiang Kai-shek in countering the Dalai Lama. He was later involved in rebelling against communist rule.

== Background ==
He belonged to a branch of the large Pandatsang clan, who hailed from Kham. Pandatsang means "House of Pangda" in Kham. The Pandatsang were an extremely rich Khampa trading family with enormous influence in Kham. The family leader was Nyigyal. The family's servants were known to often boast "Sa spang mda' gnam spang mda'", meaning "The earth is Pangda's, the sky is Pangda's", and "I am connected to Pangda, what are you going to do to me?" They were behind the rebellion against Lhasa in 1934 and the Tibet Improvement Party.

Rapga was the brother of Pandastang Togbye, who was a great friend of Thubten Kunphela who was from Nyemo county, located between Shigatse and Lhasa, U-Tsang. Partly out of anger over Kunphela's fall from power after the death of the 13th Dalai Lama, Thubten Gyatso, Togbye organized a revolt in 1934 against the Tibetan government within areas they controlled in the western part of Kham, roughly one third of the entire Kham region. His brother had military control while Rapga was more of a "scholar". They aimed to ultimately attack Lhasa, and were required to take Chamdo first.

He did so in the belief that many monks from Kham originating in the large monasteries near Lhasa would support him in this. The Tibetan government knew that the rebellion originated from within Kham. The residence of his family in Lhasa was confiscated, but ultimately negotiations ensued. The reason was that the family was the main exporter of Tibetan wool abroad, and any further incident could affect government funds. As a result of the outcome of the negotiations, the members of the family did not pursue the rebellion further.

While the Kham rebels were escaping from the Tibetan government forces, they were forced into battle against both the Sichuan warlord Liu Wenhui and the Chinese Communist party forces which were on the Long March.

Rapga fled from Kham to Kalimpong via Kanting and Nanking after the revolt failed.

== In India ==
In 1935 Pandatsang Rapga left to India. Some time later, he went to Chongqing, which served as the wartime capital for the Kuomintang Republic of China government during the Second Sino-Japanese War, where he joined the Mongolian and Tibetan Affairs Commission of the Republic of China government. In 1939 he left again to return to Kalimpong in India.

== The Tibet Improvement Party ==
In 1939 he eventually founded the Tibet Improvement Party in Kalimpong, in British India. The monk Gendün Chöphel, the exiled Thubten Kunphela (Wylie: thub-bstan-kun-vphel; Chinese: 土登貢培; pinyin: tǔdēng gòngpéi), and the poet Canlocen (Wylie: lcang-lo-can-bsod-nams-rgyal-po; Chinese: 江樂金; pinyin: jiānglèjīn) joined as members of the revolutionary party, which sought to topple the Tibetan government in Lhasa and reform Tibet, and sought to "oust the British from India". The party considered the then government of Tibet as entirely outdated, religious and feudal, and sought a more modern, secular government which would pay attention to improving infrastructure, such as the introduction of more advanced technology, better education, and a modern standing army. The ultimate goal of the party regarding the future of Tibet was that Tibet would become an autonomous republic within the Republic of China. The reform of the Buddhist religion in Tibet and the liberation of Tibet from the existing tyrannical Government‟ and the revolutionary restructuring of the Tibetan government and society", were among the goals that the Tibet Improvement Party wanted to accomplish. The Party advocated reform by "giving the monks salaries instead of estates and requiring them to study instead of engaging in business". Rapga would attempt to attain his aims for Tibet with the Kuomintang's help.

Pandatsang Rapga was strongly influenced by the ideas of Sun Yat-sen, especially his Three Principles of the People (Sānmín Zhǔyì) doctrine. He believed that change in Tibet would only be possible in a manner similar to when the Qing Dynasty was overthrown in China. He borrowed the theories and ideas of the Kuomintang as the basis for his model for Tibet. The party was funded by the Kuomintang and by the Pandatsang family.

In 1943 Rapga requested that China help him achieve revolution against the ruling Tibetan authorities in Lhasa as dissent grew among the Tibetan population, and face off against the Tibetan army with his own Kham militia. Chiang Kai-shek received a classified report on these plans from Wu Zhongxin in October 1943. Chiang then gave Rapga a Chinese passport, a salary of 100,000 each month via the Mongolian and Tibetan Affairs Commission, and the cooperation of his secret agents in India, Tibet, and Xikang.

In 1945, Rapga sent Gendün Chöphel on a mission to Lhasa via Tawang and Bhutan to draw maps of the area, while masquerading as a pilgrim beggar monk. When Rapga placed a request for 2,000 membership cards and 4,000 membership forms, the British official H. E. Richardson caught wind of his activities in Kalimpong and the existence of the Tibet Improvement Party. The British deliberated among themselves whether the Tibetan government should be tipped off about the party. The Tibet Improvement Party was reported to the Tibetan government on 10 April by Richardson. The extradition of Rapga was then demanded by the Tibetan government on 26 April, but since Rapga declared himself a national of China Richardson could not go through with the extradition, advising deportation to China instead. Rapga's house was raided on June 19, 1946 for plotting revolution, counterfeiting, and spying, by the police under British orders. Rapga destroyed all relevant party documents beforehand since he was tipped off by the Chinese commissioner in Delhi, but the police searched a suit pocket and found letters documenting Rapga's correspondence with the Chinese over the Tibet Improvement Party. Rapga was ordered to be deported from British India. He requested assistance from the Mongolian and Tibetan Affairs Commission in China to halt the deportation.

The British collected information on Rapga under a file titled "Chinese intrigues and Tibetan subversives (Rapga)". Other people affiliated with the Tibet Improvement Party like Abdul Wahid Ladakche, Jampa Wosel, and Kumphel La (Thubten Kunphela)'s activities were also put under surveillance by the British.

Pandatsang hailed the Three Principles of Dr. Sun for helping Asian peoples against foreign imperialism and called for the feudal system to be overthrown. Rapga stated that "The Sanmin Zhuyi was intended for all peoples under the domination of foreigners, for all those who had been deprived of the rights of man. But it was conceived especially for the Asians. It is for this reason that I translated it. At that time, a lot of new ideas were spreading in Tibet", during an interview in 1975 by Dr. Heather Stoddard.

The party had some tensions regarding financing. A section of Pandatsang's family saw the party as an instrument to create an independent Kham state equally independent of both China and the Dalai Lama's Tibet.

The activities of the party were eventually noticed by the British. That led to the Tibetan government becoming aware of the existence of the party and in particular, Pandatsang Rapga. The Tibetans demanded that he be extradited to Tibet, however, it was not possible, due to Rapga possessing a Chinese passport. In 1947, British India expelled him to Shanghai.

== Return to Kham ==
In 1950, Rapga travelled to Chamdo, which is located on the border between the part of Kham controlled by the Tibetan government, and the part which was independent of their control. The People's Liberation Army had occupied Kham without much opposition from the Khampas. The relationship between the Khampa and the Tibetan 14th Dalai Lama government in Lhasa was extremely poor at the time. Rapga offered the governor of Chamdo, Ngabo Ngawang Jigme, some Khampa fighters in exchange for the Tibetan government recognizing the independence of Kham. Ngabo refused the offer.

After the defeat of the Tibetan Army in Chamdo, Rapga started mediating in negotiations between the People's Liberation Army and the Tibetans. Rapga and Topgay engaged in negotiations with the Chinese during the Battle of Chamdo. Khampas either defected to the Chinese PLA forces or did not fight at all. The PLA succeeded in the invasion.

The Khampa Tibetans and Lhasa Tibetans held each other in mutual contempt and dislike, with the Khampa in some cases hating Lhasa rule even more than Chinese rule.

Rapga stayed independent in his own ideology and politics, refusing to join the Dalai Lama's elder brother Gyalo Thondup in an endeavour in which Gyalo proposed that all different Tibetan factions unite against China and pressure India to act over China's control of Tibet.

Rapga participated in raising Khampa rebels to fight against the Communists during the 1959 Tibetan Rebellion. Rapga continued to cooperate with the Republic of China Kuomintang government after it fled to Taiwan, who had also provided training to Khampa rebels against the Communist PLA forces. Rapga claimed to have 100,000 troops under his control.

The Republic of China on Taiwan had a dispute with the United States as to whether Tibet would be independent, since the ROC government claimed Tibet as part of its territory. Rapga agreed to a plan in which the revolt against the Communists would include anti-feudalism, land reform, a modern government, and to give power to the people. As late as the 1970s, Rapga believed that Sun Yat-sen's three principles were the best hope for Asian peoples against feudalism and foreign imperialism.
