= Tibet Improvement Party =

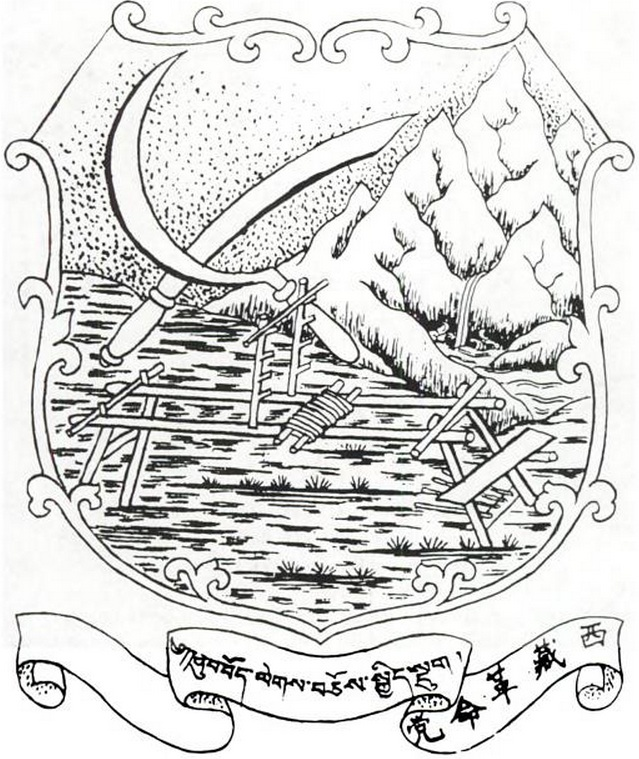
- Tibetan name: ནུབ་བོད་ལེགས་བཅོས་སྐྱིད་སྡུག
- Chinese name: 西藏革命黨
- Leader: Pandatsang Rapga
- Founder: Pandatsang Rapga
- Founded: 1939
- Dissolved: defunct circa 1950
- Headquarters: Kalimpong
- Ideology: Three Principles of the People; Secularism
- International affiliation: Kuomintang

The Tibet Improvement Party (Tibetan: ནུབ་བོད་ལེགས་བཅོས་སྐྱིད་སྡུག, Wylie: nub-bod-legs-bcos-skyid-sdug, lit. 'West Tibet Reform Association'; Chinese: 西藏革命黨; pinyin: Xīzàng Gémìngdǎng, lit. 'Tibet Revolutionary Party') was a nationalist, revolutionary, anti-feudal and pro-Republic of China political party in Tibet. It was affiliated with the Kuomintang and was supported by mostly Khampas, with the Pandatsang family playing a key role.

== Names ==
The Tibetan, Chinese, and English versions of the party names all have separate meanings. The Chinese name (Chinese: 西藏革命黨; pinyin: Xīzàng Gémìngdǎng) means "Tibet Revolutionary Party". In English, it is known as the Tibet Improvement Party or alternatively the Tibetan Progressive Party. The Tibetan name (Tibetan: ནུབ་བོད་ལེགས་བཅོས་སྐྱིད་སྡུག, Wylie: nub-bod-legs-bcos-skyid-sdug) translates as "West Tibet Reform Association".

== Background ==
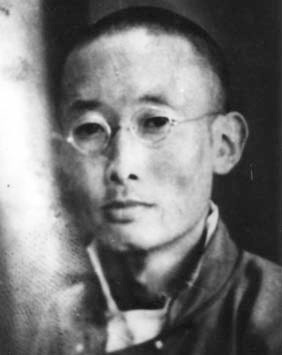
Gendün Chöpel

The party was founded in 1939 in Kalimpong in India by Pandatsang Rapga, who came from the extensive Pandatsang family, a wealthy wool merchant family from Kham. The other core members of the movement were Thubten Kunphela, the Buddhist reformist monk Gendün Chöpel and the poet Canlocen. Kunphela was the most powerful man in Tibet after the 13th Dalai Lama, Thubten Gyatso, in the period between 1931 and 1933. After the death of the Dalai Lama, Kunphela lost his dominant position and was exiled. In 1937, he managed to flee, settling in Kalimpong.

== Beliefs ==
The party considered the then government of Tibet as entirely outdated and feudal, and sought a modern, secular government which would improve infrastructure, introduce newer technology, better education, and a standing army.

Pandatsang Rapga was strongly influenced by the ideas of Sun Yat-sen, and especially his Three Principles of the People. He believed that change in Tibet would only be possible in a manner similar to when the Qing Dynasty was overthrown in China, and borrowed the theories and ideas of the Kuomintang as the basis for his model for Tibet. The party was funded by the Kuomintang and by the Pandatsang family. It was said that Rapga "was a devout believer in the political ideology of Sun Yat-sen and had translated some of Sun's more important writings into Tibetan", including the Three Principles of the People. The Kuomintang General Huang Musong, who was also Chairman of the Mongolian and Tibetan Affairs Commission, talked Rapga into traveling to China in 1936 to join the commission. The Tibet Improvement Party had "a hundred or so sympathizers among Khamba traders" according to Melvyn C. Goldstein. Rapga hailed the three principles of Dr. Sun for helping Asian peoples against foreign imperialism and called for the feudal system to be overthrown. In addition, he stated that "The Sanmin Zhuyi was intended for all peoples under the domination of foreigners, for all those who had been deprived of the rights of man. But it was conceived especially for the Asians. It is for this reason that I translated it. At that time, a lot of new ideas were spreading in Tibet", during an interview in 1975 by Dr. Heather Stoddard.

The ultimate goal of the party regarding the future of Tibet was that Tibet would become an autonomous republic within the Republic of China. Rapga stated that the party goal was revolution and "liberation of Tibet from the existing tyrannical government".

It is challenging to assess the actual political power of the party. The Tibetan government of the Dalai Lama controlled the western part of Kham, constituting one-third of the entire Kham region. However, there was significant support for certain ideas of the movement. The relationship between many Khampas and the Tibetan government in Lhasa was highly negative. Hundreds of traders from Kham and a section of the Pandatsang family viewed the party as a tool to establish an independent Kham state, equally independent of both China and the Dalai Lama's Tibetan state. The 9th Panchen Lama Thubten Choekyi Nyima, who was also pro-Chinese and worked with the Republic of China, also adopted the ideas of Sun Yat-sen like Rapga.

=== Activities ===
The Republic of China Kuomintang government under Chiang Kai-shek sought to extend Chinese influence in Tibet. Chiang covertly propped up and financed Rapga and his movement. Rapga wanted to battle the Tibetan Army with a pro-China Khampa militia, seeking Chiang's assistance in September 1943 right before the Cairo Conference. Rapga used the term "hopelessly ill-suited for the modern world" to describe the Tibetan government of the Dalai Lama, and the Tibet Improvement Party openly supported the Kuomintang and the Republic of China against the Lhasa government of Tibet. Chiang gave a Chinese passport to Rapga, as well as 100,000 yuan every month.

In 1945, Rapga sent Gendün Chöphel on a mission to Lhasa via Tawang and Bhutan to draw maps of the area, while masquerading as a pilgrim beggar monk.

== The end of the movement ==
When Rapga placed a request for 2,000 membership cards and 4,000 membership forms, the British official H. E. Richardson caught wind of his activities in Kalimpong and the existence of the Tibet Improvement Party. The British deliberated among themselves whether the Tibetan government should be tipped off about the party.

On 10 April, The Tibet Improvement Party was reported to the Tibetan government by Richardson. The extradition of Rapga was then demanded by the Tibetan government on 26 April. However, since Rapga declared himself a national of China, Richardson could not go through with the extradition. Richardson instead advised deportation to China. On 19 June 1946, Rapga's house was raided by the police under British orders for plotting revolution, counterfeiting, and spying. Rapga destroyed all relevant party documents beforehand, since he was tipped off by the Chinese commissioner in Delhi, but the police searched a suit pocket and found letters documenting Rapga's correspondence with the Chinese over the Tibet Improvement Party. Subsequently, Rapga was ordered to be deported from British India. However, he requested assistance from the Mongolian and Tibetan Affairs Commission in China to halt the deportation. Rapga was expelled from British India in 1947 to Shanghai. Kunphela was also expelled and went to Nanjing.

In 1946, Gendün Chöpel disguised as a monk and went to Tibet on behalf of Rapga, to gather intelligence and support for the party. However, he was quickly arrested by the Tibetans and imprisoned until 1950. This event led to the end of the movement.
