= Three Principles of the People =

Political philosophy developed by Sun Yat-sen

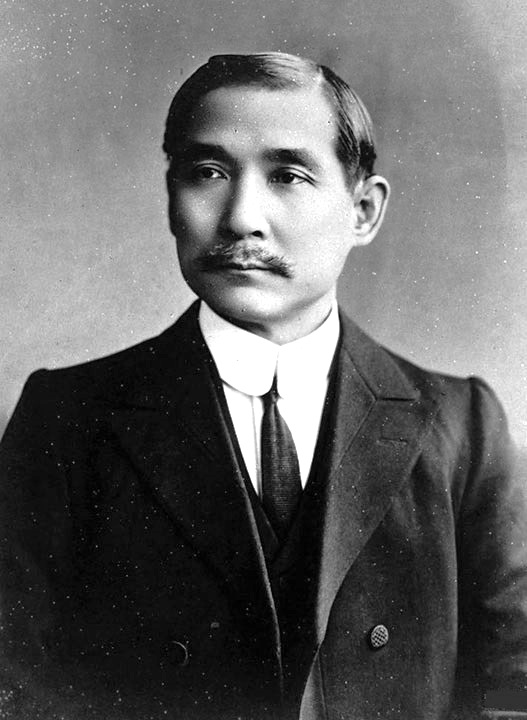
- Sun Yat-sen, who developed the Three Principles of the People
- Traditional Chinese: 三民主義
- Simplified Chinese: 三民主义
Transcriptions
Standard Mandarin
- Hanyu Pinyin: Sānmín Zhǔyì
- Bopomofo: ㄙㄢ ㄇㄧㄣˊ ㄓㄨˇ ㄧˋ
- Wade–Giles: San^{1}-min^{2} Chu^{3}-i^{4}
- Tongyong Pinyin: San-mín Jhǔ-yì
- IPA: [sán.mǐn ʈʂù.î]
other Mandarin
- Xiao'erjing: صً مٍ ﺟُﻮْ ىِ
Wu
- Wugniu: sae^{1} min^{2} tsyu^{3} gni^{6}
- IPA: Shanghainese: [se˥ min˨ tsɿ˧ ȵi˦]
Hakka
- Romanization: sam^{24} min^{11} zu^{31} ngi^{55}
Yue: Cantonese
- Jyutping: saam^{1} man^{4} zyu^{2} ji^{6}
- IPA: [sam˥ mɐn˩ tsy˧˥ ji˨]
Southern Min
- Hokkien POJ: Sam-bîn Chú-gī

The Three Principles of the People (Chinese: 三民主義; pinyin: Sānmín Zhǔyì) refer to a nationalist, republican, anti-imperialist political ideology developed by Sun Yat-sen which consist of nationalism (民族主義), democracy (民權主義), and people's welfare (民生主義). The Principles were influenced by a broad set of influences, including Georgism, Marxism, and Chinese utopianism. Under Kuomintang rule, Sun's thought achieved canonical status as part of an overall cult of personality.

Aided by fellow members of his Tongmenghui, Sun first set forth the Principles in 1905, notably in a polemic published by the newly-founded party newspaper Minbao; later editions featured articles on the theme by Sun's associates. From January to August 1924, Sun delivered a series of weekly lectures on the Principles, which were later collected and published under the title The Three Principles of the People.

After Sun's death in 1925, the Kuomintang united China under its banner and established Sun's principles, as codified in the 1924 lectures and interpreted by party leader Chiang Kai-shek, were made the official ideology of the state. Under Communist rule, both Sun and his Principles were comparatively minimized, until Deng's era of reform, during which they were used to justify his Four Modernizations.

== History ==
=== Origins ===
In 1894, Sun Yat-sen founded the radically anti-Qing Revive China Society. After the failure of its 1895 uprising, Sun entered a years-long exile, part of which he spent in England. Apart from a brief and well-publicized detention in the Chinese Legation, the time was a period of profound intellectual study and formation, to which he later dated the conception of his nascent Principles.

After another uprising in 1900, Sun was forced to compete for diaspora support with the reformist leaders Kang Youwei and Liang Qichao, thus spending much of 1903-1905 visiting to overseas Chinese communities across the world, including San Francisco in 1904. The Revive China Society member Liu Cheng-yu would later claim in his memoirs that, while both in San Francisco, he and Sun had a conversation which inspired the latter to incorporate the principle of people's livelihood into his nascent platform. Around the same time, his rhetoric also evolved to reflect the more radical anti-Manchuism of the newly forming radical student movements, whom he courted throughout the period. In a European visit in 1905, Sun made significant progress in winning them to his side: additionally, in a speech in Brussels, Sun set forth for the first time the ideas behind his Principles.

In October 1905, Sun, Huang Xing, Song Jiaoren, and other radical figures formed the Tongmenghui in Tokyo. In the party's manifesto, and in an article written by Sun for the first edition of the party paper (Minbao), the Three Principles of the People ( whose party manifesto set forth the Three Principles of the People as a feature of its program. In the first edition of the party newspaper Minbao, Sun wrote an article explaining what those Principles meant: subsequently, younger collaborators, like Hu Hanmin, Wang Jingwei, Feng Ziyou, fleshed out the Principles into an ideology. In December 1906, the Hong Kong newspaper Republic Daily carried an advertisement for Minbao. Later, Feng Ziyou claimed that, while editing a Hong Kong Tongmenghui paper, he ran an advertisement for Minbao, in which he shortened the phrase "promoting nationalism, democracy, and people's welfare" (提倡民族主義民權主義民生主義) to the term “Three Principles of the People” (三民主義).

=== In Minbao ===
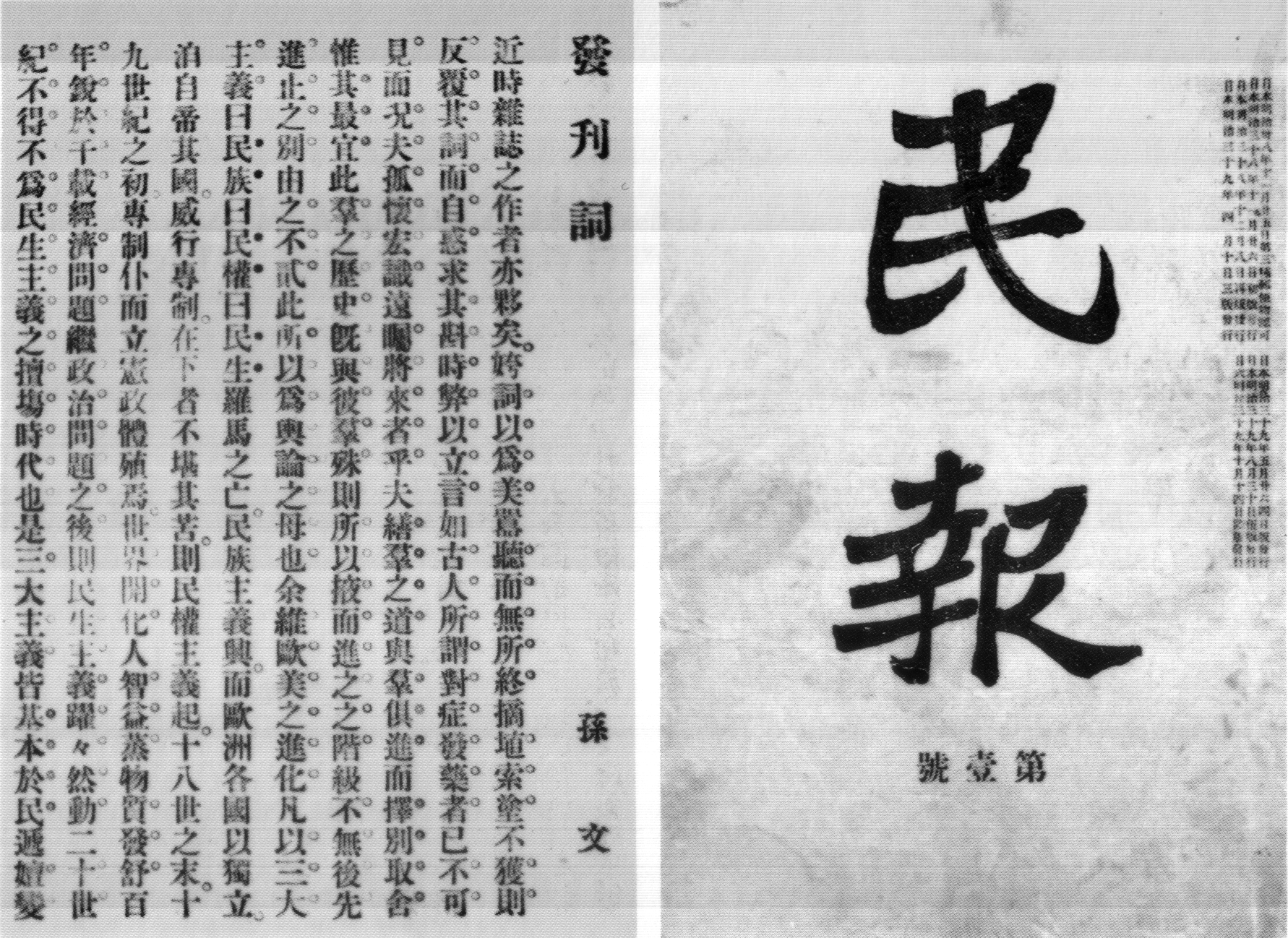
The inaugural issue of Minbao, which contained Sun's article on the Principles

From 1905 to 1907, Sun Yat-sen and (to a much greater degree) collaborators like Wang Jingwei, Hu Hanmin, and Song Jiaoren wrote a number of articles in Minbao on the Three Principles, in order to provide definition to them as an ideology and assist in the struggle against the Tongmenghui's reformist foes, including Liang Qichao.

Among the themes of the articles was anti-Manchuism, which featured in the rhetoric of Minbao as the basis of Chinese nationalism. Wang Jingwei, for instance, argued in his article A Nation of Citizens that China's Han majority was destined to assimilate with the Manchu due to the latter's stark racial incompatibility. Constitutionalism, therefore, was merely a ploy to strengthen Manchu power over Han provincial officials: the Manchus could no more address the revolutionaries' concerns than "that the horse will sprout horns".

The Minbao polemicists also assailed Liang Qichao on the matter of democracy. Liang believed that China's national interests demanded the unity of its population under the existing dynasty, which should be transformed into an enlightened autocracy (開明專制, kaiming zhuanzhi). He argued that China was unready for a republic, and that in any case founding a republic meant revolution, and therefore chaos. In response, Sun and his allies argued that republicanism was the most modern, and thus best, form of government in existence. Moreover, republican ideals, he claimed, were rooted in Chinese culture.

As for people's livelihood, Liang claimed that social revolution was both unnecessary and potentially harmful: what China really needed was a program of capitalist industrial benefit. In response, Zhu Zhixin claimed that the Tongmenghui's form of socialism did not demand the expropriation of private property or the dictatorship of the proletariat: what the Tongmenghui wanted was a "state socialism" whose main target consisted only of monopolies. In another article, Feng Ziyou claimed that social revolution was necessary if China wanted to avoid the massive inequality and exploitation reigning in the West.

=== Sun's 1924 lectures ===
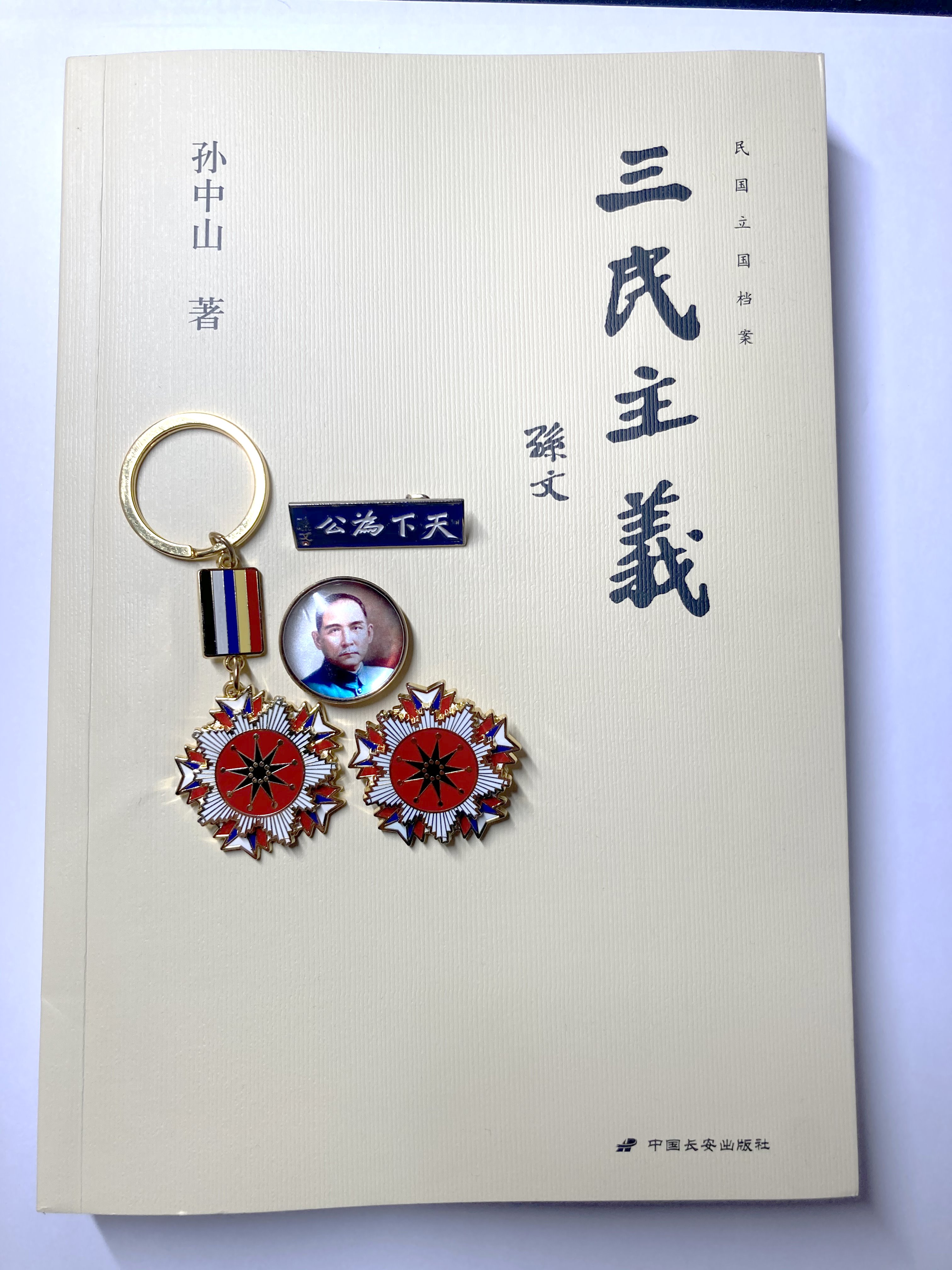
Sun's 1924 lectures, published as The Three Principles of the People

Although Sun intended to complement his other major works with text on the Principles, Chen Jiongming's 1922 attack, which destroyed his notes, prevented its completion. The text published under the title Three Principles of the People, which marks Sun's last major work before his death of liver cancer, consists of 16 lectures on the subject, which under his direction were transcribed and revised by Huang Changgu and Zou Lu. The lectures were given weekly between January and August 1921 to Kuomintang cadres while the party held its 1st National Congress. It consists of six lectures each on nationalism and democracy, and four on livelihood: two more lectures (specifically, on shelter and transportation) were intended to round out the set for a total of 18, but these were never given.

The text was Sun Yat-sen's last major work: on January 1, 1925, while in Beijing, Sun Yat-sen was diagnosed with terminal liver cancer, of which he perished on March 12. On his deathbed, Sun signed a political testament drafted by Wang Jingwei, in which he urged members of his Kuomintang to hold fast to The Three Principles of the People and his other major writings. After the Kuomintang's victory in the Northern Expedition, the text was granted canonical status as the definitive exposition of his thought. After the Nationalist government's retreat to Taiwan, Chiang Kai-shek completed Sun's discussion of livelihood with supplementary texts on education and leisure. An English translation was produced by Frank Price in 1927.

== The Principles ==
=== Nationalism (Mínzúzhǔyì) ===
Because "Mínzú" or "People" describes a nation rather than a group of persons united by a purpose, the 'Principle of Mínzú' (Chinese: 民族主義; pinyin: Mínzú Zhǔyì) is commonly rendered as "nationalism".

According to Sun, "[W]e are the poorest and weakest state in the world, occupying the lowest position in international affairs; the rest of mankind is the carving knife and serving dish, while we are the fish and meat. Our position is now extremely perilous; if we do not earnestly promote nationalism and weld together our four hundred million into a strong nation, we face a tragedy -- the loss of our country and the destruction of our nation/people."

==== The basis of nationhood ====
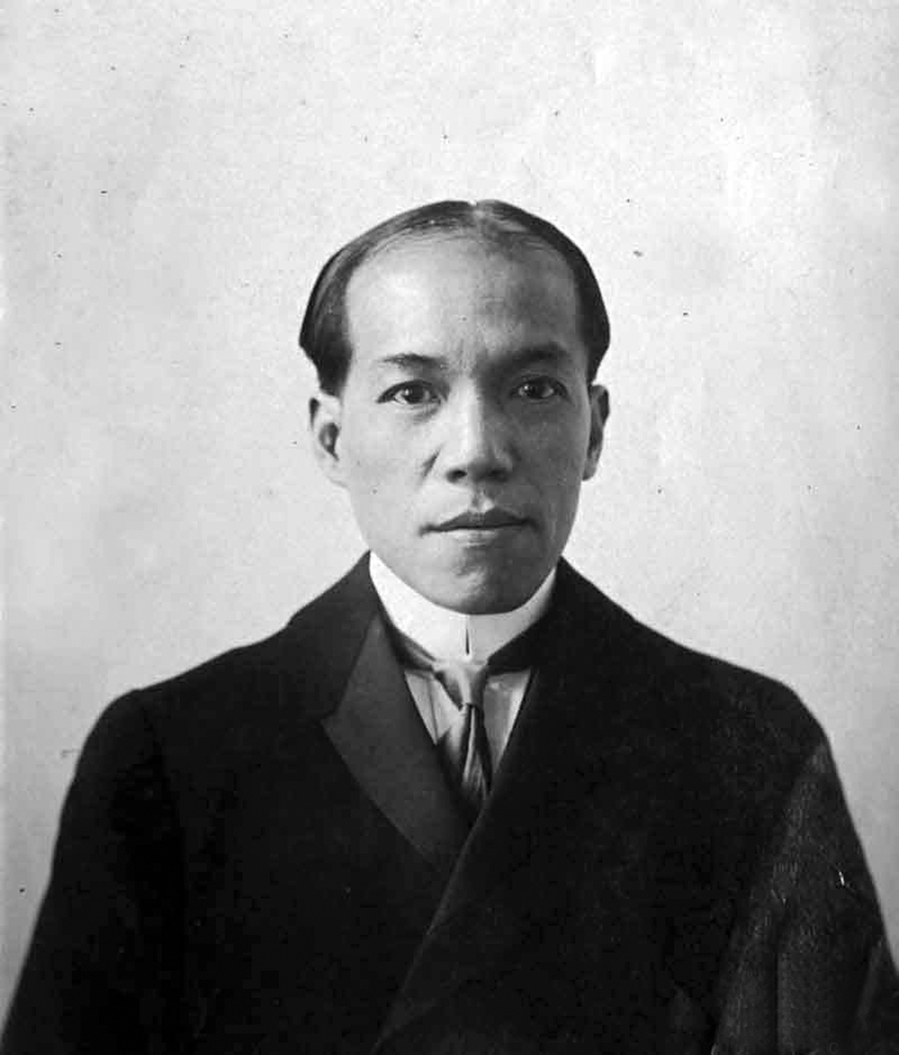
Liang Qichao, a major rival of Sun's and a major player in the creation of modern Chinese nationalism

In the late 19th century, the scholar-officians Huang Zunxian and Yan Fu popularized Western conceptions of evolution and racial identity, including social Darwinism and racial essentialism, racial struggle, and the yellow race. Yan's ideas had a strong influence on Liang Qichao, who, like Sun Yat-sen, feared the extermination of the "yellow" race at the hands of the "whites". Liang distinguished between the concept of minzu (Ch: 民族), a generally ethnic term, and guomin, which he deemed equivalent to the German concept of Volk, and of which the former was only a preliminary. He believed that individual minzu were eventually destined to form a single guomin or guozu, a final product of racial evolution which would compete on a grand scale.

In his 1924 lectures on nationalism, Sun claimed that the formation of nations was a consequence of five "natural forces": namely, "blood kinship, common language, common livelihood, common religion, common customs." With regard to common blood, Sun asserted the existence of five "main" biological races—viz. white, black, red, brown, and yellow—of hereditary character. The other forces drove both the genesis and dissolution of individual "sub-races"---for instance, a shared language could lead different races to assimilate into one. He distinguished between nation (Ch: 民族, minzu) and state (Ch: 國家, guojia): the former arose from the natural processes elaborated above, while the latter was born of military force.

In Sun's mind, demographics played a large role in the continued existence of nations. Influenced by social Darwinism, Sun saw reproduction as a key factor in passing on national identity, and thus the struggle of evolution. Because China's population growth rate had fallen below that of the West, China was in danger of extinctions at the hands of European nations.

==== National consciousness and cosmopolitanism ====
Sun blamed China's misfortunes on its loss of the "precious possession" (Ch: 寶貝, baobei) of national consciousness, as exemplified by the transition of organizations like the "Hung-mên San-ho-hui" from Ming loyalism to support of the Qing. Sun claimed that this was a consequence of China's own imperial tradition, which promoted cosmopolitanism as a means of ensuring control of subject populations. China's own weapon turned against it with the advent of the Qing, who largely were not resisted due to the acceptance of cosmopolitan ideals by the general populace. As a result, China "opened the gates for political and economic forces to break in, which never would have happened if we had preserved our nationalism". If left unchecked, these forces could destroy the Chinese people altogether.

Therefore, in Sun's mind, it was necessary to revive China's national spirit. Chinese were a "sheet of loose sand" whose clan loyalties far outweighed national loyalties, this in fact could be helpful, because existing clan organizations could be broadened to form a kind of national unity. Sun also called for a revival of traditional Chinese virtues and political thought. In doing so, he explicitly cited the Great Learning's injunction to "[s]earch into the nature of things, extend the boundaries of knowledge, make the purpose sincere, regulate the mind, cultivate personal virtue, rule the family, govern the state, [and] pacify the world", which he described as an unparalleled example of political logic.

==== Han nationalism and the Zhonghua minzu ====
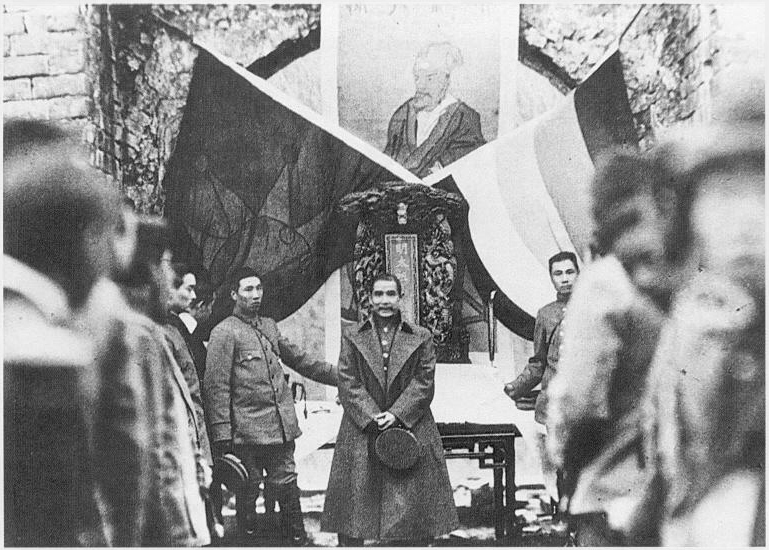
Sun Yat-sen and other members of the Government of the Republic of China at the tomb of founding Ming emperor Hongwu

The original ROC flag used to demonstrate the five races under one country.

Although Sun Yat-sen's upbringing was rooted in anti-Manchuism, he at first did not express unreserved sympathy for the harshly anti-Manchu racism of radicals like Zhang Binglin and Zou Rong, instead sharing Liang Qichao's concern for the broader evolutionary conflict between yellow and white. As he competed with Kang Youwei for support, however, he pivoted to radical Han nationalism, leading to an understanding with Zhang Binglin and other Han nationalists.

The Tongmenghui generally linked nationalism with anti-Manchuism, including in its party manifesto. Party polemics generally revolved around the themes of Manchu oppression, Manchu racial inferiority, Manchu inability to promote progress, with a particular focus on Manchu oppression, as embodied in (for instance) the mandatory queue. However, unlike figures like Zhang, who was willing to trade territory for a homogenous Han state, Sun neither accepted the expulsion or mass murder of the Manchu minority.

Immediately after the Qing's downfall, the revolutionary government decided to treat all ethnic groups as equal partners, fearing that European powers would otherwise seize Chinese territory. The policy adopted by Sun and the new government was an ethnic model branded wuzu gonghe (Ch: 五族共和), the five races in question being the Han, Manchu, Mongolian, Tibetan, and Hui ethnic groups. However, Sun did not originally approve of this particular model of ethnic relations, and criticized it consistently after his short presidential tenure. He instead came to champion the ideal of a "Zhonghua minzu" (中華民族), which Liang Qichao had first articulated. In his eyes, China's minorities were destined by natural selection to assimilate into the Han majority, which he effectively equated with China as a whole.

==== Anti-imperialism ====
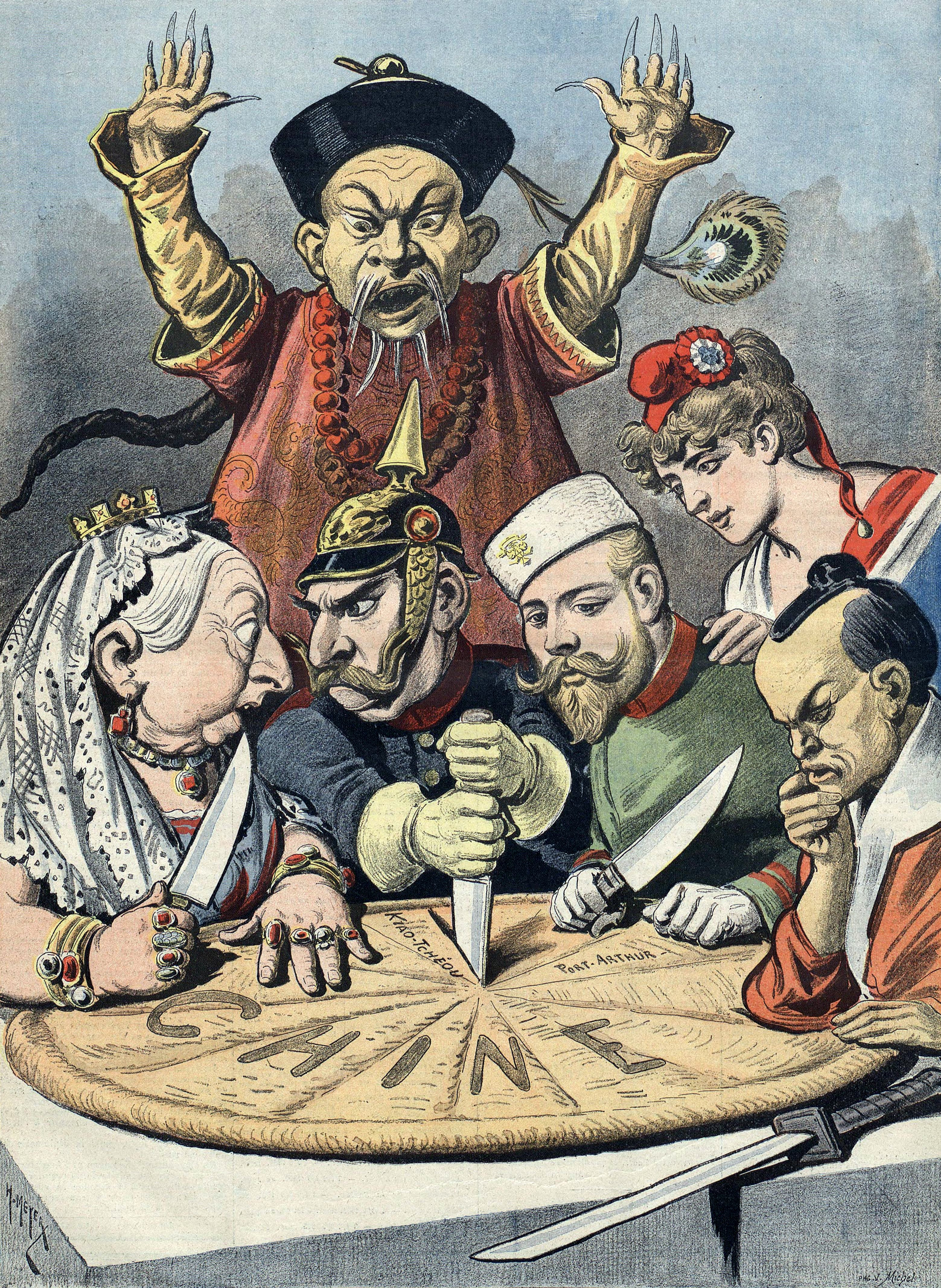
China depicted at the mercy of foreign imperial powers

Before 1911, Sun generally rooted his nationalism in anti-Manchuism as opposed to anti-imperialism, although he expressed anti-imperialist sentiments a number of times in his early career. By the 1920s, however, anti-imperialism became a mainstay of his nationalism, finding expression in works like The Three Principles of the People. Scholars like George Yu have claimed that this pivot coincided with Sun's turn to the Soviet Union, although Sun Yat-sen biographer Marie-Claire Bergère suggests that Sun could have based his anti-imperialism on past experiences of Western rejection.

Sun made use of the concepts of wangdao (Ch: 王道) and badao (Ch: 霸道), which were rooted in Confucian political discourse. Imperialism, he claimed, was a "policy of aggression upon other countries by means of political force", which itself was an example of badao. Although China had an imperial history, it generally preferred wangdao as a tool of foreign relations. The West, by contrast, was characterized by "the rule of Might", with the sole exception of Soviet Russia. Imperialism, Sun believed, posed an existential threat to nationalities. Foreign imperialism and economic exploitation had made China a "hypocolony", and was sure to lead to its disappearance altogether, as it had with indigenous Americans.

The main goal, Sun now felt, was repealing the unequal treaties, a task he believed Japan was morally obliged to assist, and which was now framed as equivalent to the full resumption of Chinese sovereignty. Once China recovered its own position, it should likewise assist other victims of imperialism under a policy Sun referred to as "rescu[ing] the weak and lift[ing] up the fallen". (Note: The original Chinese is a four-character saying:擠弱扶傾.) Sun envisioned a future struggle between "right against might", in which China should unite with "the weaker and smaller nations" on the side of "Right". which itself was an example of badao. Sun claimed that Soviet Russia, due to its anti-imperialism, had become a force for right, and praised Lenin as a "prophet".

=== Democracy (Mínquánzhǔyì) ===
The framing of 'democracy' (Chinese: 民權主義; pinyin: Mínquán Zhǔyì; lit. 'Principle of people's right') in the Three Principles of the People differs from the typical Western view of democracy, being based in Liang's interpretation of General will, which prioritizes the power of the group over individual freedoms. Sun viewed traditional Chinese society as too individualistic and stated that individual liberty must be broken down so that the Chinese people could pressed together, using the metaphor of adding cement to sand.

==== Five Power Constitution ====
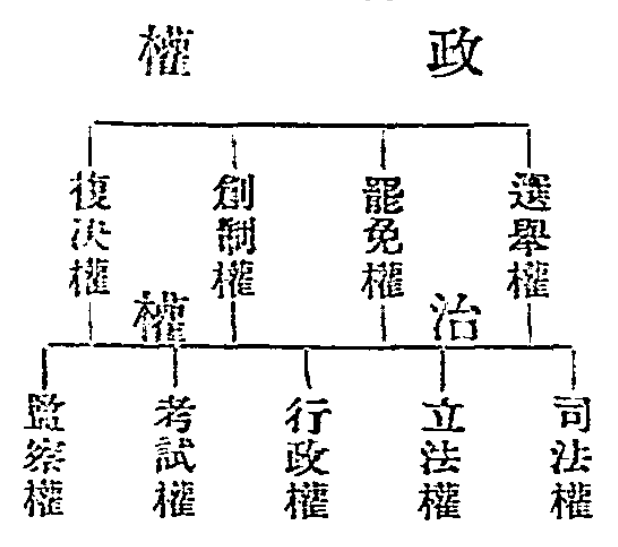
Diagram showing the relationship between the people's powers and government's powers

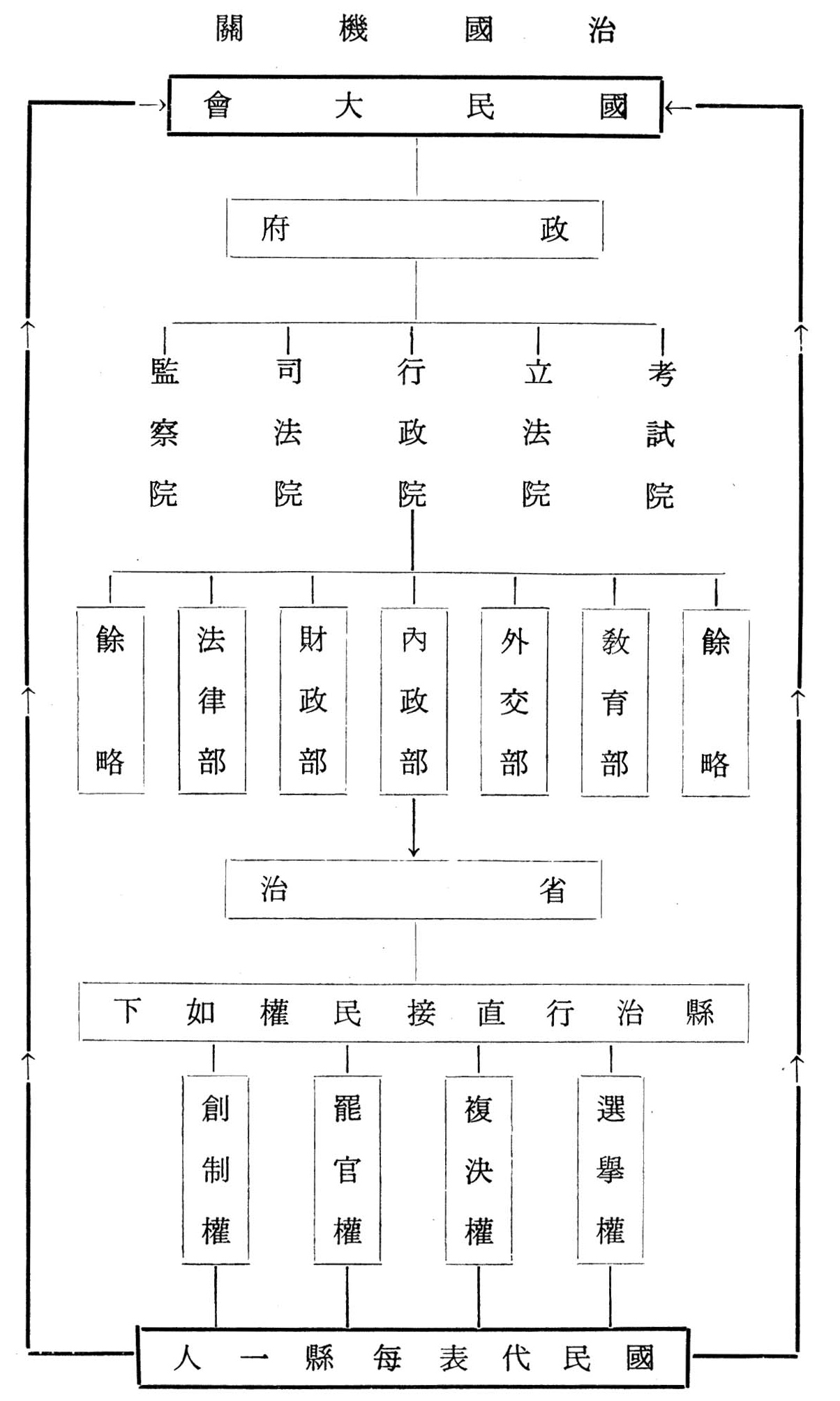
Sun Yat-sen's five-branch constitutional structure

Instead of dividing power between three branches, Sun Yat-sen proposed dividing it between five. His framework incorporated the traditional legislative, executive, and judicial branches, but added separate branches dedicated to oversight and administering civil service exams, which were derived from the traditional censorate and the keju respectively.

He believed that Western legislatures were overly strong, in part due to their control of oversight. In America, he claimed, this resulted in legislative tyranny: only remarkably capable presidents, like Lincoln, were able to preserve executive independence in the face of congressional oversight actions. (Note: As can be found in the speech cited below, he said:比方美國糾察權歸國會掌握，往往擅用此權，挾制行政機關，使他不得不頫首聽命，因此常常成為議院專制，除非有雄才大略的總統，如林肯、麥堅尼、羅斯福等才能達到行政獨立之目的。)

According to Sun, "[w]hen the four political powers of the people control the five governing powers of the government, then we will have a completely democratic government organ, and the strength of the people and of the government will be well balanced."

==== Quan and neng ====
In his lectures on democracy, Sun advocated for a distinction between the sovereignty (Ch: 權，quan) of the people and the ability (Ch: 能，neng) of the government. Government was to be entrusted to experts, who would have the freedom to do as they saw fit, despite their dependence on the people. In his fifth lecture on democracy, he drew an analogy between such a conception of government and the role of a chauffeur:

If I had not given the chauffeur complete authority...but had insisted that he take my route, I certainly could not have kept my engagement. Because I trusted him as an expert and did not bind his arm, he was able to take that route which he thought was best, and arrived at the appointed time...The people are masters of the nation and should act towards the government as I did towards the chauffeur on that ride to Hongkew, that is, let it drive and choose the way...let us make a clear distinction between sovereignty and ability.

— Sun Yat-sen, Three Principles of the People, Democracy, Lecture 5

To ensure the accountability of the government to the people, Sun endorsed granting the masses what he called the four powers (四權): namely, suffrage, recall, initiative, and referendum. The latter were features of direct democracy, which Sun and his collaborators had become interested in by 1919–1920 in reaction to the early Republic's failures. According to Sun, only a people which enjoyed all four rights possessed "thoroughgoing, direct popular sovereignty". In Western representative systems, "the democracy in practice...was simply the right to vote", leaving the people no way of controlling their representatives' performance "whether they turn out to be worthy or incompetent".

==== Local autonomy and federalism ====
In a number of speeches and texts, Sun advocated for a form of local autonomy. For instance, after Yuan Shikai's death, Sun wrote that the Republic's issues stemmed from the failure to establish local autonomy. Likewise, in 1919, he stated that the establishment of local autonomy constituted a major priority, (Note: In Chinese, he said:立國根本在人民先有自治能力，所以地方自治為最重要之一事，現應從一鄉一區推而至於縣一省一國，國家才有希望。) a view he repeated in 1922. (Note: In his words: 實行之次第，則莫先於分縣自治。蓋無分縣自治，則人民無所憑著，所謂全民政治，必無由實現。無全民政治，則雖有五權分立、國民大會，亦終末由舉主權在民之實也。以是之故，吾夙定革命方略，以為建設之事當始於一縣，縣與縣聯，以成一國。如此，則建設之基礎在於人民，非官僚所得而竊，非軍閥所得而奪。)

However, Sun opposed federalism, a position which led him into conflict with Guangzhou military leader and former ally Chen Jiongming, who supported regional autonomy for his native Guangdong. Sun argued that federalism would simply empower provincial bureaucracies, to the detriment of genuine local autonomy. Instead, as part of a gradual transition to democracy, Sun proposed granting individual counties autonomy. This, he claimed, would enable ordinary people to exercise their rights directly. Moreover, he claimed, a unitary government would be more conducive to modernization:

Those who propose self-government in the provinces of this Union argue superficially that the United States was built upon the foundation of several small self-governing states and that China has a foundation of many provinces which could also become self-governing, wealthy, and strong......The United States' wealth and power have not come only from the independence and self-government of the original states, but rather from the progress in unified government which followed the federation of the states. Her wealth and power were the result of the union of the states, not of the division into states. Since China was originally unified, we should not divide her again into separate provinces.

— Sun Yat-sen, The Three Principles of the People, Democracy, Lecture 4

==== Individual liberty ====
Although Sun Yat-sen connected his principle of democracy to the French revolutionary slogan liberté, égalité, fraternité, he criticized the May Fourth students' demands for greater individual liberty. Europe's revolutions were driven by an oppressive lack of liberty, whereas, historically, China's people had too much of it. The metaphor he used was that of "a sheet of loose sand": the individual Chinese, like an individual grain, moved in their own direction "without any tendency to cohere". The goal, therefore, was to create unity and thus achieve national liberation. In Sun's words:

..[L]iberty has both good and bad features and is not a holy thing. If foreigners say that we are a sheet of loose sand, we will acknowledge the truth, but we cannot accept their assertion that Chinese have no understanding of liberty...Why has China become a sheet of loose sand? Simply because of excessive individual liberty. Therefore the aims of the Chinese Revolution are different from the aims in foreign revolutions...we, because...we have become a sheet of loose sand and so have been invaded by foreign imperialism and oppressed by the economic control and trade wars of the Powers, without being able to resist, must break down individual liberty and become pressed together into an unyielding body...

— Sun Yat-sen, San Min Chu-i: The Three Principles of the People, Democracy, Lecture 2

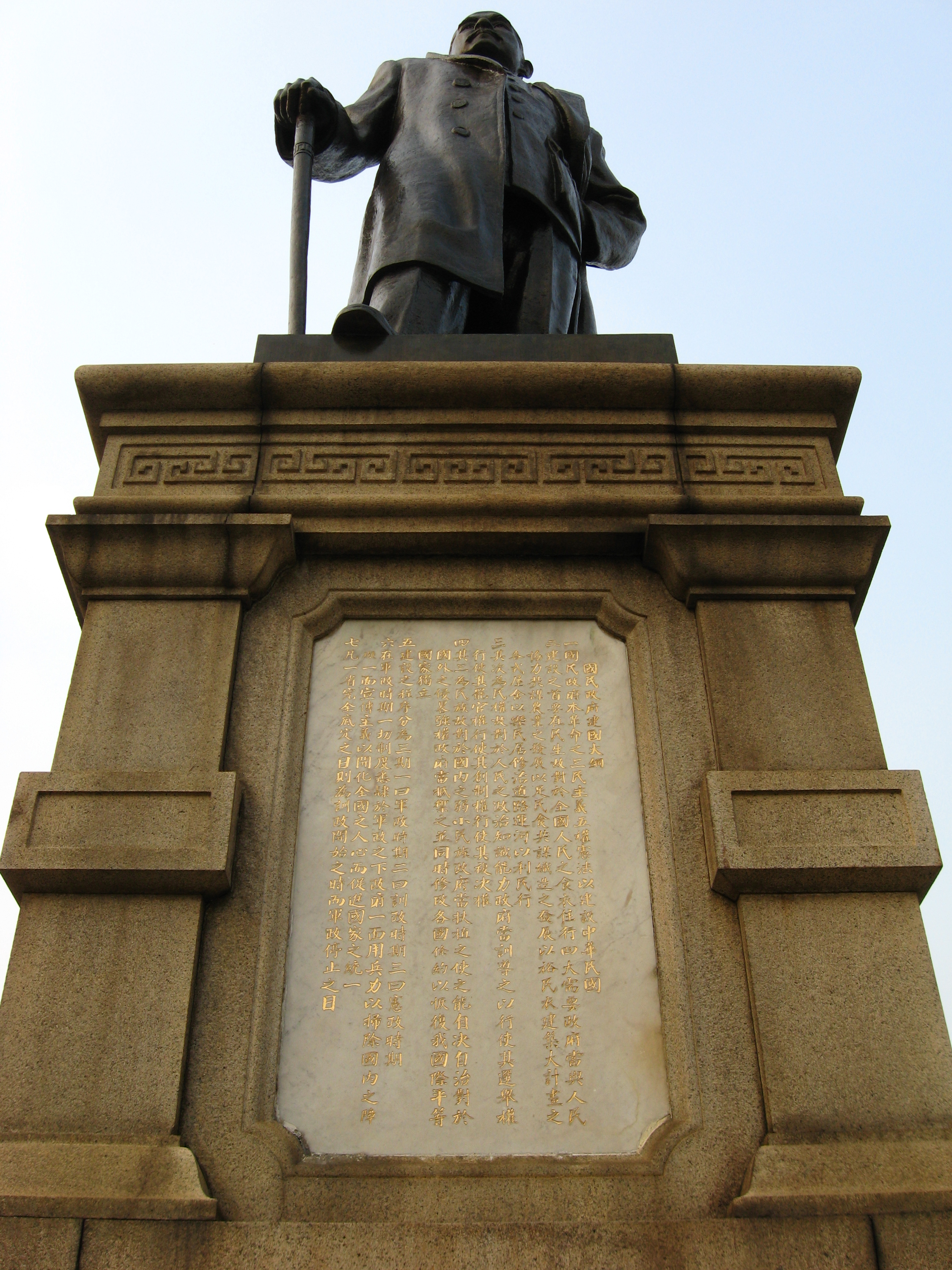
Inscription of The Fundamentals of National Reconstruction on the plinth of Sun's statue in Guangzhou

==== Political tutelage ====
As part of its 1905 manifesto, the Tongmenghui prescribed a three-stage framework for the transition from imperial rule to democracy. This framework prescribed a transition period of three stages: 1) a military government, tasked with eradicating the evils of the past regime; 2) a transitional period where the military government would coexist with democratic localities; 3) a fully constitutional, civilian-run democracy. The transitional period, the manifesto claimed, would only take six years, after which a constitution would be promulgated and the government entrusted to an elected president and legislature. In 1914, during the formation Chinese Revolutionary Party, Sun reiterated the idea of a political transition, but collapsed the phases of military rule and transitional government into a single, indefinite "revolutionary period" of party rule.

In 1924, Sun Yat-sen again rearticulated the nature of the political transition. There would be three stages, according to The Fundamentals of National Reconstruction: 1) "the military period"; 2) "the period of political tutelage"; and 3) full constitutional government. During the military period, the government would "employ its armed force to eradicate all internal obstacles" until the restoration of provinces to "complete order", after which tutelage would begin. Each county would remain under tutelage until having passed the conditions laid out in the Fundamentals, which included political education and infrastructure improvements. Once every county in a province passed these conditions, the whole province would enter the stage of constitutional government, and when this had happened in one-half of all provinces, a "People's Congress" would be called to promulgate a constitution. Although he did not specify in either the Fundamentals or his Three Principles of the People, Sun seems to have intended for tutelage to mean party rule, based on his January 20, 1924 speech to the First National Congress of the Kuomintang.

=== People's livelihood / Social Welfare (Mínshēngzhǔyì) ===
The Principle of Mínshēng (Chinese: 民生主義; pinyin: Mínshēng Zhǔyì; lit. 'Principle of people's welfare/livelihood') is sometimes translated as "[Principle of] Government for the People" or "Socialism". The concept may be understood as social welfare and as a direct criticism of the inadequacies of unregulated capitalism. He divided livelihood into four areas: clothing, food, housing, and mobility, and planned out how an ideal (Chinese) government can take care of these for its people.

==== Modernization ====
As early as the early 1900s, Sun and his revolutionaries, like rival Liang Qichao, were deeply interested in building a powerful, modern China. In The International Development of China, Sun laid out an ambitious scheme for accomplishing this. His plan called for Western powers to set aside 25% of their military budgets to finance infrastructure projects in China, including the damming of the Yangtze. This was to involve the assistance of outside experts, as well as the establishment of state enterprises (though without excluding private industry).

In the 1924 lectures, Sun reiterated his vision of state-led modernization. Private capital was to be limited, but not abolished: moreover, it was to coexist with state-run public enterprises. Sun claimed that, by developing the "three great industries" of "communications, mining, and manufacturing" as domains of the public sector, the average Chinese would be able to share in immense national income gains.

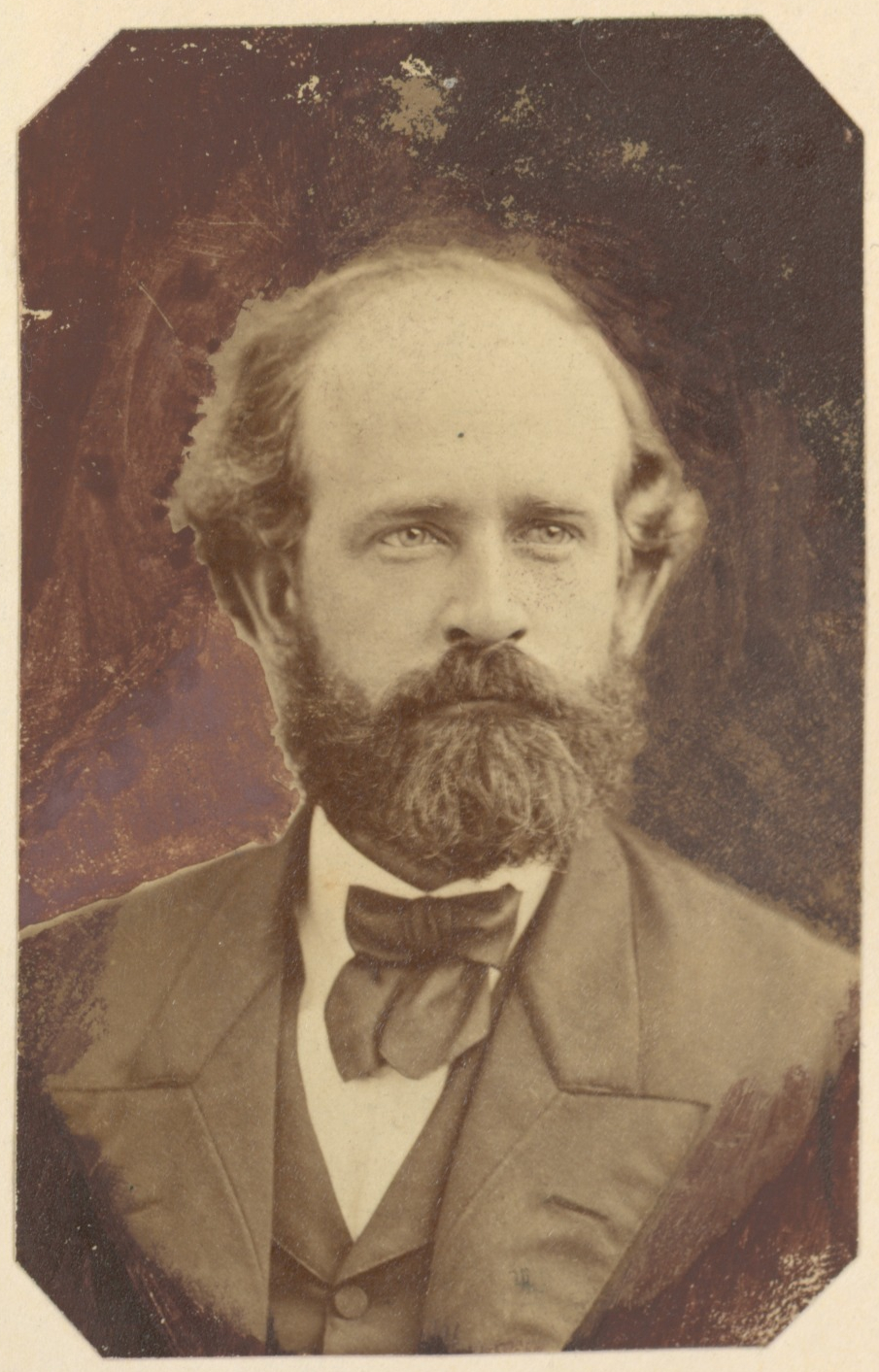
Henry George's thought exerted a large influence on Sun's land reform plans

==== Land equalization ====
One of the planks of the Tongmenghui's manifesto was a plan for land equalization, which Sun had previously discussed in 1902 and 1903. The objective of this plan was to curb speculation, in line with the then-influential thought of Henry George.

As he explained in speeches between 1906 and 1912, Sun's plan, in contrast with George's own proposals, relied on self-assessment. Landowners would get to report the value of their own holdings to the government, which would collect a one-percent land value, but the government could buy back land at its declared value for the sake of financial needs (e.g. public infrastructure projects). In 1924, Sun claimed that his buyback mechanism would encourage accurate land assessments:

[S]uppose the government makes two regulations: first, that it will collect taxes according to the declared value of the land; second, that it can also buy back the land at the same price...if the landowner makes a low assessment he will be afraid lest the government buy back his land at that value and make him lose his property; if he makes too high an assessment, he will be afraid of the government taxes according to this value and his loss through heavy taxes.

— Sun Yat-sen, Three Principles of the People, Livelihood, Lecture 2

==== Relationship to socialism, communism ====
Before the foundation of the Tongmenghui, Sun used the term socialism (shehuizhuyi) for the concepts later encompassed under his principle of livelihood. In his Minbao article, he referred to the prospect of "social revolution" (社會革命): shortly after, Feng Ziyou linked the "social revolution" to socialism, which he conceived of as a Bismarckian system rooted in Sun's Georgist land proposals. After 1911, Sun's newly-formed Kuomintang, under the influence of Song Jiaoren, made of socialism a program of industrial development, dismaying Sun's Guangdong faithful, led by Hu Hanmin.

In his 1924 lectures on livelihood, Sun linked his principle of livelihood to socialism and communism. State control of capital, he claimed, would enable the entire people to share in capital's profits, thus preventing the evils of economic inequality. However, he did not offer a ringing endorsement of Marxism, whose methods, he claimed, were inapplicable to the underdeveloped and impoverished China. Marx himself, he claimed, was a "social pathologist" whose picture of social development was not wholly correct: that Marx's prediction of longer working hours failed, for instance, suggested the falsehood of his theory of surplus value.

==== Human history and Datong ====
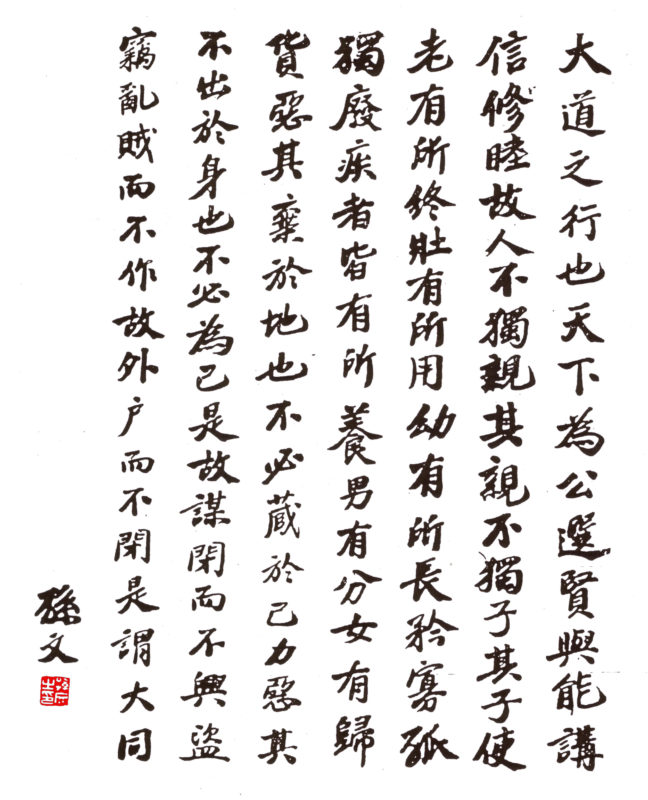
The full Datong passage from the Book of Rites in Sun's handwriting

Sun's first lecture on livelihood focused to a large extent on the development of history. He believed that the quest for subsistence, not class struggle, was the driving force behind history, or, as he put it, "the law of social progress". In The International Development of China, he asserted that "the primary force of human evolution is coöperation and not struggle".

In Sun's vision, the complete realization of his principle of livelihood would enable China to achieve the Confucian ideal of Datong, or "Confucius' hope of a 'great commonwealth'". This concept stemmed from the Book of Rites, in which Confucius is quoted as saying:

When the Grand course (大道) was pursued, a public and common spirit ruled all under the sky (天下為公)...Thus men did not love their parents only, nor treat as children only their own sons. A competent provision was secured for the aged till their death, employment for the able-bodied, and the means of growing up to the young. They showed kindness and compassion to widows, orphans, childless men, and those who were disabled by disease, so that they were all sufficiently maintained...This was (the period of) what we call the Grand Union (大同).

— Confucius (trans. James Legge), Book of Rites, Liyun

In the Book of Rites, this aboriginal state of affairs was presented as having been lost. In its absence, the Confucian ruler, like the mythical heroes Yu the Great and Tang of Shang, was to maintain the xiaokang in the hopes of perhaps enabling a return to datong.

== Interpretations after Sun's death ==
=== Kuomintang ===
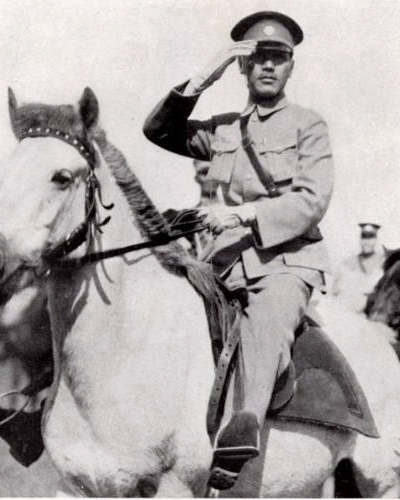
Chiang Kai-shek, generalissimo of the KMT military and leader of mainland China from 1927 to 1949

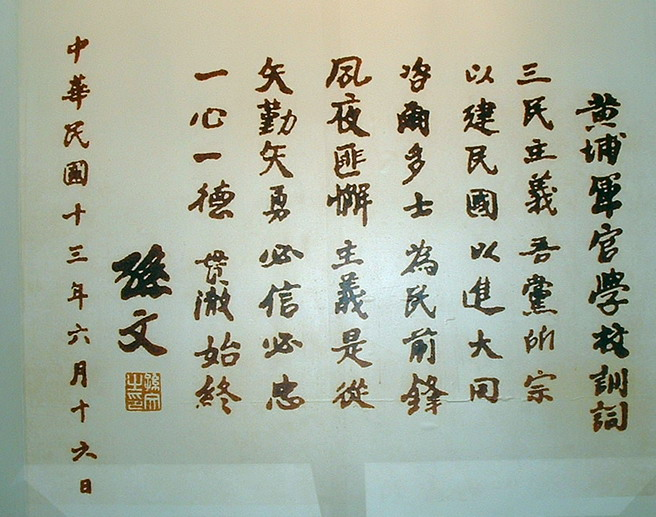
Handwritten text of Sun's Whampoa speech, later made national anthem

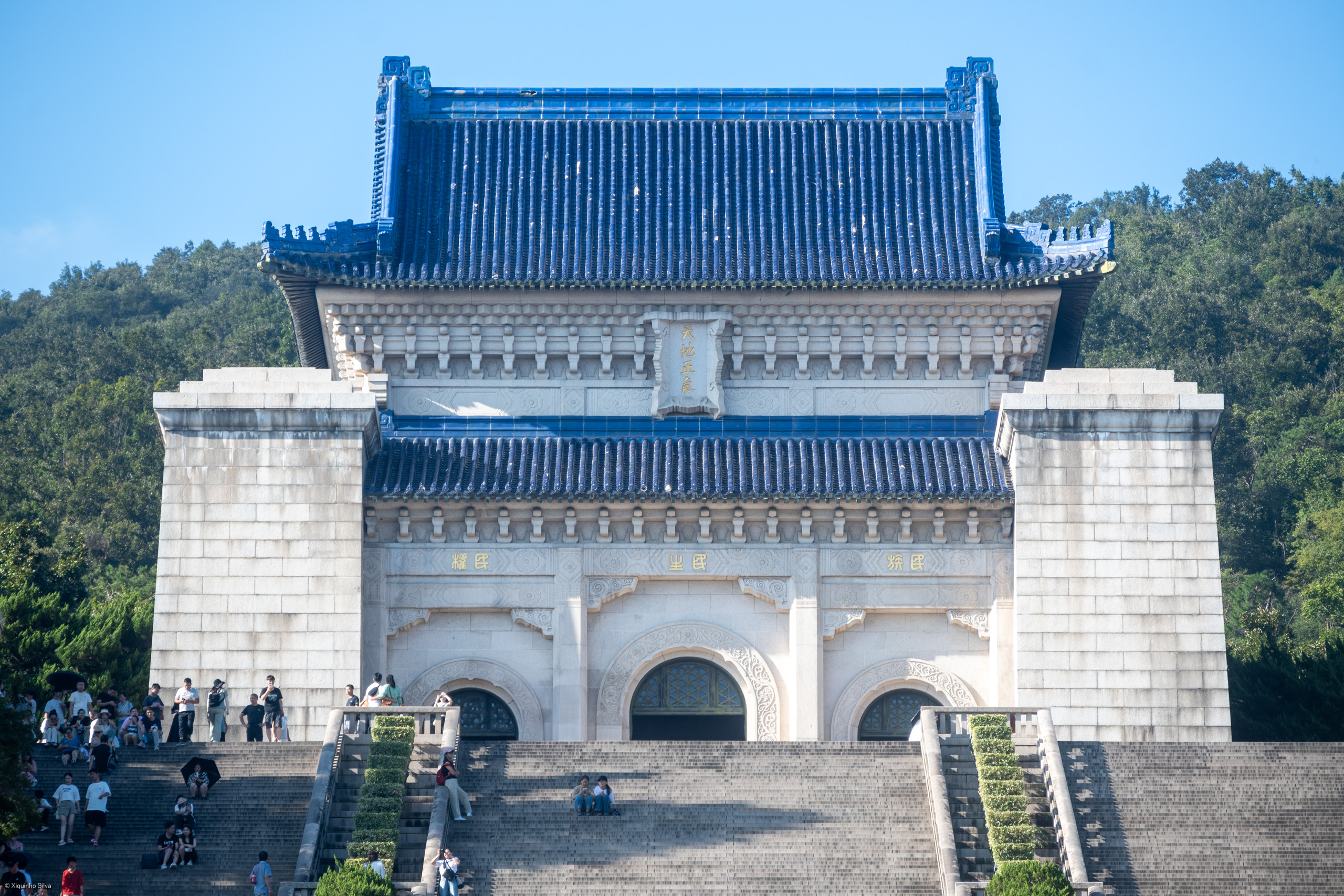
Sun's mausoleum, with the Principles engraved on the facade

After Sun's death, Whampoa Military Academy commandant Chiang Kai-shek steadily increased his role and influence within the party, eventually rising to become its most important figure. From May 1926 to June 1928, he commanded the party's Northern Expedition, which resulted in the successful unification of much of the country, the formation of the National Government, and the purge of the Chinese Communist Party (CCP) from the party.

From 1928 to 1949, the Kuomintang ruled as the government of mainland China. Under the 1928 Organic Law, the government was reorganized according to Sun's principles of political tutelage, with party organs in supreme command over every aspect of the government. Organizationally, it consisted of the five branches Sun described in his Principles and his Fundamentals of National Reconstruction: viz. the Executive Yuan, Legislative Yuan, Judicial Yuan, Control Yuan, and Examination Yuan.

Under KMT rule, the Principles were elevated to the status of a political dogma. Influenced by the conservative interpretations of Dai Jitao, the party read the Principles in continuity with Confucian virtues, which were also stressed as part of Chiang's New Life Movement.

The Principles were also incorporated into a matrix of official rituals and symbols. Every Monday, members of public institutions gathered to bow to Sun's portrait and listen to readings of his Testament. The Principles were also inscribed on Sun's tomb, whose location was connected according to legend with the Mandate of Heaven. Sun's Whampoa address, whose opening line invokes the Principles, was selected as the KMT's party anthem in 1930, and as the national anthem in 1937

=== Chinese Communist Party ===
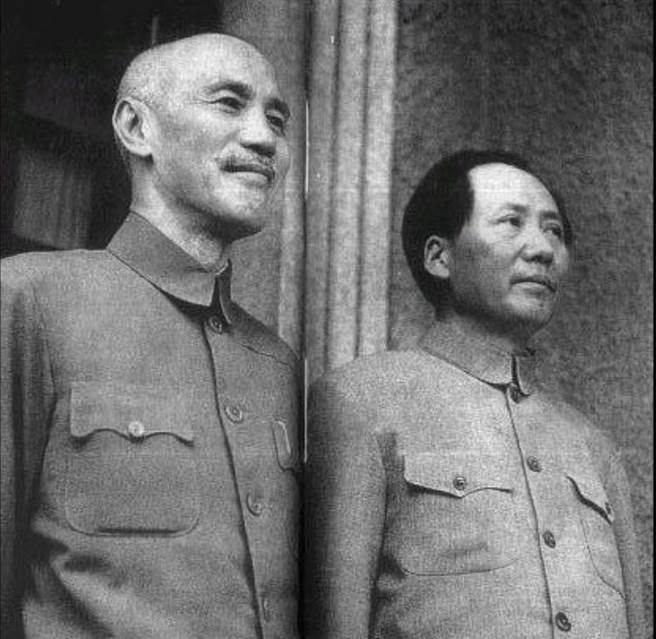
Chiang and Mao in Sichuan; during WWII, both claimed fidelity to Sun's Principles

After years of civil war and increasing Japanese aggression, Mao's CCP reached an agreement with the KMT to begin cooperation on the basis of Sun's Principles, which became known as the Second United Front. However, in the essay On New Democracy (1940), Mao claimed that the Principles should be understood in light of the "New Three Principles of the People", which were embodied in the "Three Great Policies" of Sun's "Three Great Policies" of "alliance with Russia, co-operation with the Communist Party and assistance to the peasants and workers".

In an interview with Reuters reporters, Mao said: "A free and democratic China will be a country in which all levels of government up to the central government are elected by universal, equal, secret suffrage and are accountable to the people who elected them. It would realize Dr. Sun Yat-sen's Three Principles of the People, Lincoln's principles of government of the people, by the people, and for the people, and Roosevelt's Four Freedoms. It will guarantee the country's independence, unity, unification, and cooperation with the democratic powers."

After the PRC's rise to power, Sun continued to receive honor, but less of it, and less so for the Principles than for the Three Great Policies. However, after the rise of Deng Xiaoping, Sun was hailed for his plans of economic development, which were connected to Deng's Four Modernizations.

== Legacy in other countries ==
=== Vietnam ===
The Vietnam Revolutionary League was a union of various Vietnamese nationalist groups, run by the pro-Chinese Việt Nam Quốc Dân Đảng. The name "Quốc Dân Đảng" is the Vietnamese rendering of "Kuomintang". Its goal was Vietnamese independence, drawing inspiration from the Three Principles of the People and opposing both Japanese and French imperialism. The Revolutionary League was led by Nguyễn Hải Thần, who was born in Northern Vietnam. General Zhang Fakui once blocked the Communists of Vietnam, and Ho Chi Minh from entering the league. The KMT utilized these Vietnamese nationalists during World War II against Japanese forces.

The motto of Independence - Freedom - Happiness of the Democratic Republic of Vietnam and the Socialist Republic of Vietnam, despite its communist political background, was also taken from the Three Principles of the People.

=== Tibet ===
The pro-Kuomintang and pro-ROC Khamba revolutionary leader Pandatsang Rapga, who established the Tibet Improvement Party, adopted Dr. Sun's ideology, including the Three Principles, incorporating them into his party and using Sun's doctrine as a model for his vision of Tibet after achieving his goal of overthrowing the Tibetan government.

Pandatsang Rapga hailed the Three Principles for helping Asian peoples against foreign imperialism and called for the feudal system to be overthrown. Rapga stated that "The Sanmin Zhuyi was intended for all peoples under the domination of foreigners, for all those who had been deprived of the rights of man. But it was conceived especially for the Asians. It is for this reason that I translated it. At that time, a lot of new ideas were spreading in Tibet", during an interview in 1975 with Heather Stoddard. Sun's ideology was put into a Tibetan translation by Rapga.He believed that change in Tibet would be possible only as in the Qing dynasty's overthrow in China. He borrowed the Kuomintang's theories and ideas as the basis for his model for Tibet. The Kuomintang and the Pandatsang family funded the party.

=== Singapore ===
The establishment of the People's Power Party in May 2015 by opposition politician Goh Meng Seng marks the first time in contemporary Singaporean politics that a political party was formed with the Three Principles of the People and its system of having five branches of government as espoused by Sun Yat-sen as its official guiding ideology.

The People's Power Party has adapted the ideas of the Five Powers with slight modifications to remain relevant to contemporary political and social structures. The emphasis is put on the separation of the Five Powers, which naturally means the separation of certain institutions from the Executive's control.

The power of impeachment (originally vested in the Control Yuan) has been expanded to encompass various contemporary functional government institutions. Examples include the Corrupt Practices Investigation Bureau, advocacy of the Ombudsman Commission, Equal Opportunity Commission, freedom of the press, and freedom of speech.

The power of examination has been adapted and modified to fit the modern concept of selection for both political leaders and civil servants. This involves institutions such as the Elections Department and the Public Service Commission.

The People's Power Party advocates that the institutions included in these two powers, namely the power of impeachment and the power of selection, be put under the supervision of Singapore's elected president.

== See also ==
- Five Races Under One Union
- Zhonghua minzu
- Grand Alliance for China's Reunification under the Three Principles of the People
- Constitution of the Republic of China
- Democracy in China
- History of the Republic of China
- National Anthem of Taiwan
- Republic of China (1912–1949)
- Politics of the Republic of China
- Three Principles of the Equality
- Five Principles of Peaceful Coexistence
- Chiangism
- Dai Jitao Thought
- Liberté, égalité, fraternité
- Life, Liberty and the pursuit of Happiness
- Unidemism

== Bibliography ==
- Sun Yat-sen, translated by Pasquale d'Elia.The Triple Demism of Sun Yat-Sen. New York: AMS Press, Inc., 1974.
