= Gendün Chöphel =

Tibetan scholar, thinker, writer, poet, linguist and artist

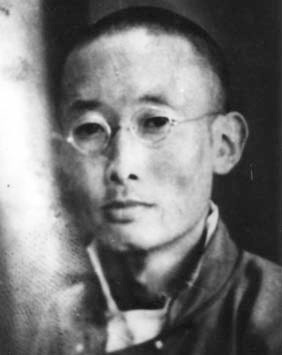
A portrait of Gendün Chöphel while in India (1936)

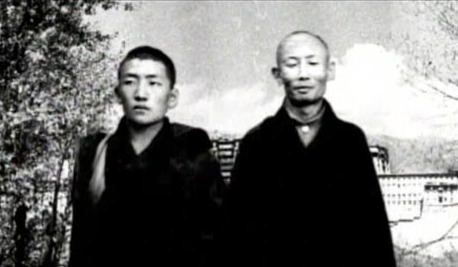
Chöphel (right) with Rakra Tethong Rinpoche standing in front of the Potala Palace in Lhasa (c. 1949)

Gendun Chompel or Gendün Chöphel (Tibetan: དགེ་འདུན་ཆོས་འཕེལ།, Wylie: dge 'dun chos 'phel) (1903–1951) was a Tibetan scholar, thinker, writer, poet, linguist, and artist. He was born in 1903 in Shompongshe, Rebkong, Amdo. He was a creative and controversial figure and is considered by many to have been one of the most important Tibetan intellectuals of the twentieth century.

Chöphel was a friend of the Indian scholar and independence activist Rahul Sankrityayan. His life was the inspiration for Luc Schaedler's film The Angry Monk: Reflections on Tibet. He is best known for his collection of essays called The Madman's Middle Way: Reflections on Reality of the Tibetan Monk Gendun Chophel. and Grains of Gold: Tales of a Cosmopolitan Pilgrimage, written during his time in India and Sri Lanka in between 1934 and 1946. These essays were critical of modern Hinduism, Christianity, and British imperialism. While condemning places and events like the Black Hole of Calcutta and the Goa Inquisition, he praised certain British colonial practices of legislations.

His erotic classic, Treatise on Passion (Tibetan: འདོད་པའི་བསྟན་བཅོས།, Wylie: ‘dod pa’i bstan bcos), was completed in 1939, though it was first published posthumously in 1967. Written in Tibetan verse, this poetic and practical work was inspired both by his reading and partial translation of the Kama Sutra (introduced to him by Sankrityayan) and by his own recent, and prolific, sexual awakening. The work aims to provide extensive guidance on heterosexual sex and sexual happiness for both women and men in an overtly democratic spirit. By now an ex-monk, Chöphel was happy to compare favourably his detailed sexual guidance (written from a lay perspective) to that contained in an earlier – and much less explicit – work bearing a similar title composed by Mipham the Great.

== See also ==
- Tibet Improvement Party

== Sources ==
=== Translations ===
- Chöphel, Gendün (2006), Clarifying the core of Madhyamaka: Ornament of the thought of Nagarjuna. (2nd ed.), Arcidosso, GR, Italy: Shang Shung Publications
- Chöphel, Gendun; Hopkins, Jeffrey (1993), Tibetan Arts of Love, Snow Lion Publications, ISBN 0-937938-97-1
- Chöphel, Gedün (2006). Die tibetische Liebeskunst. Nietsch. ISBN 3-934647-97-9.
- Chöphel, Gedun (1985). Dhammapada, Translation of the Dharma Verses with the Tibetan Text. Dharma Publishing. ISBN 0-913546-98-4.
- Chöphel, Gedun (2009). In the Forest of Faded Wisdom: 104 Poems by Gendun Choephel, a Bilingual Edition, edited and translated by Donald S. Lopez Jr. University of Chicago Press. ISBN 978-0-226-10452-2.

=== Other sources ===
- Bogin, Benjamin; Decleer, Hubert (1997), "Who was 'this evil friend' ('the dog', the 'fool', 'the tyrant') in Gedun Choephel's Sad Song?", The Tibet Journal, 22 (3): 67–78
- Dhondup, K.: "Gedun Choephel: the Man Behind the Legend". Tibetan Review, vol. 13, no. 10, October 1978, p. 10–18.
- Huber, Toni (2000). Guide to India, a Tibetan Account By: Gendun Choephel. Dharamsala, India: Library of Tibetan Works & Archives. pp. 162pp. ISBN 81-86470-25-5.
- Jinpa, Thupten (2003), "Science as an Ally or a Rival Philosophy? Tibetan Buddhist Thinkers' Engagement with Modern Science", in Wallace, B. Alan (ed.), Buddhism & Science: Breaking New Ground, Published by Columbia University Press, pp. 71–85, ISBN 0-231-12335-3
- Lopez, Donald S. (Jr.) (2007). The Madman's Middle Way: Reflections on Reality of the Tibetan Monk Gendun Choephel. University Of Chicago Press. ISBN 0-226-49317-2.
- Mengele, Irmgard (1999). Gedun Choephel: A Biography of the 20th Century Tibetan Scholar. Dharamsala, India: Library of Tibetan Works & Archives. ISBN 81-86470-23-9.
- Stoddard, Heather (1985). Le mendiant de l'Amdo (Recherches sur la Haute Asie). Paris: Societe d'ethnographie. ISBN 2-901161-28-6.
- Roerich, George N. and Gedun Choephel (Translator) (1988). The Blue Annals by Gö Lotsawa. Motilal Banarsidass, Delhi, 1976, Reprint in 1979. [reprint of Calcutta, Royal Asiatic Society of Bengal, 1949, in two volumes].
