= Institute of Revolutionary Practice =

Kuomintang training school

Institute of Revolutionary Practice 革命實踐研究院
- Abbreviation: KMT IRP
- Director: Cheng Li-wun
- Deputy Director: Yu Shu-hui; Huang Chien-hao
- Founder: Chiang Kai-shek
- Founded: 8 July 1949; 77 years ago
- Headquarters: 232–234 Bade Road, Sec. 2 Zhongshan District, Taipei, Taiwan, Republic of China
- Youth wing: Kuomintang Youth League
- Ideology: Three Principles of the People
- Mother party: Kuomintang (KMT)
- Type: Political party school

Website
- Official Facebook page

Institute of Revolutionary Practice
- Traditional Chinese: 革命實踐研究院
Transcriptions
Standard Mandarin
- Hanyu Pinyin: Gémìng shíjiàn yán jiù yuàn
- Wade–Giles: Ko2-ming4 shih2-chien4 yan2 chiu4 yüan4

The Institute of Revolutionary Practice (Chinese: 革命實踐研究院) is an educational institution established in 1949, and affiliated with the Kuomintang.

== History ==
On 8 July 1949, Chiang Kai-shek and a group of Kuomintang leaders, among them Chang Chi-yun, Hsu Pei-keng, Ku Cheng-kang, and Sun Li-jen, founded the Institute of Revolutionary Practice. Later that month, Chiang Ching-kuo, Tao Hsi-sheng, and Yu Ta-wei were appointed to the preparatory committee. The institute published its own newsletter, Practice, the first issue of which was dated 15 October 1949. The institute's first students were admitted on 16 October 1949. During the 1950s, Chiang Kai-shek attempted to reform the Kuomintang, so that its members were loyal to him. The trainees at the Institute of Revolutionary Practice and other programs, were part of this reform. While in a leadership position at the school, Chiang Ching-kuo relied on his role to build his political influence with younger party members, who trained there to become mid- to high-level members of the Kuomintang. Upon the death of Chiang Kai-shek in 1975, the oversight of the Institute of Revolutionary Practice was delegated to the Central Committee of the Kuomintang. The institution was known as the National Development and Research Institute between October 1999 and 2017, when it returned to its original name. The institute resumed training sessions in July 2020, twenty years after they had been suspended.

The institute is located in the Muzha portion of Wenshan District in Taipei, on a plot of land known as Zhongxing Shanzhuang. The Kuomintang acquired the land on which the property is located in 1964. A portion of the plot was sold to the Yuanlih Group in August 2005 for NT$4.25 billion. In 2014, portions of the institute's premises were designated by the Taipei City Government as historic buildings.

Kuomintang chairman Johnny Chiang stated in 2020 that the institute's directorship is an unpaid and "obligatory post".

== Structure ==
- Kuomintang Youth League
- Research Department
- Teaching Department

== Leaders ==
- Chiang Kai-shek (16 October 1949 – 31 October 1949)
- Chen Cheng (31 October 1949 – 21 May 1950)
- Peng Meng-chi (21 May 1950 – 1954)
- Chu Sung-chiu (26 June 1954 – 25 September 1954)
- Chiang Kai-shek (May 1956 – 1958)
- Chang Chi-yun (1958–1972)
- Yuan Shouqian (1963–1967)
- Lee Huan (6 August 1975 – 14 June 1978)
- Chiang Yen-si (14 June 1978 – January 1988)
- Lee Teng-hui (January 1988 – December 1988)
- Chuang Huai-yi (from 1994)
- Tsai Bih-hwang (December 1997 – August 2002)
- John Kuan (2002–2005)
- Chen Ta-tai (24 July 2009 – 4 September 2011)
- Kao Huei (until 12 February 2014)
- Kuo Shou-wang (May 2014 – January 2015)
- Jimmy Wu (February 2015 – March 2016)
- Lin Chung-shan (June 2016 – July 2017)
- Lin Huo-wang September 2017 – 25 March 2020)
- Lo Chih-chiang (26 March 2020 – 5 October 2021)
- Lin Yi-hua (5 October 2021 – 1 February 2022)
- Lin Kuan-yu (1 February 2023 – 1 November 2025)
- Cheng Li-wun (1 November 2025 – Incumbent)
