= Democratic centralism (Kuomintang) =

Political system used by the Kuomintang

Democratic centralism (Chinese: 民主集權制; pinyin: mínzhǔ jíquánzhì; Wade–Giles: min^{2}chu^{3} chi^{2}chʻüan^{2}chih^{4}; lit. 'democratic collect-authority system') (Note: 民主集权制 means "democratic centralism" as interpreted by the KMT. In a non-KMT case, "Democratic centralism" in Chinese translates into 民主集中制 (mínzhǔ jízhōngzhì; min^{2}chu^{3} chi^{2}chung^{1}chih^{4}; 'democratic central system').) is a main principle of Leninist vanguard parties, but it was also closely related to the party organization and rule of the Chinese nationalist Kuomintang (KMT) in the Republic of China. However, unlike the Chinese Communist Party (CCP), the KMT did not include "democratic centralism" in its party constitution.

== Theory ==
Democratic centralism of the KMT was also closely related to Sun Yat-sen's Separation of Five Powers theory. Sun thought that the parliamentary power in the Western representative democracy was so great that it was a kind of [populist] 'parliamentary dictatorship' that they controlled administrative agencies, so he argued that the inspection and legislative powers should be independent of the popularly elected parliament, so that the inspection and legislative powers should be exercised by experts, not by the people. Sun's Three Principles of the People ideology saw that political power should be delegated to experts; the people can express their thoughts and have 'experts' implement them for them.

== History ==
Democratic centralism of the KMT is modeled after democratic centralism of the early Communist Party of the Soviet Union (CPSU); Lenin suggested that the organization of the party should form a secretively disciplined organization based on a small number of professional revolutionaries; during the Warlord Era, the KMT reorganized the KMT's party organization similar to the CPSU under Mikhail Borodin.

The organizational structures of the Kuomintang would remain in place until the democratization on Taiwan in the 1990s and would serve as a structural basis of several Taiwanese political parties such as the Democratic Progressive Party.

== See also ==
- Nationalist government
- Rastakhiz Party, the non-socialist/communist ruling party in Pahlavi Iran from 1975 to 1978, advocated democratic centralism
- Taiwanese Localism Front, Taiwan's radical anti-CCP and Taiwanese nationalist organizations were influenced by the Leninist elements of the KMT, including the Vanguardism
