= Kuomintang Youth League =

Branch of the Kuomintang political party

Kuomintang Youth League 中國國民黨青年團
- Leader: Kang Chin-yu
- Founded: 2006
- Headquarters: 16 Hangzhou S. Rd. Sec.1; Zhongzheng District, Taipei, Taiwan
- Mother party: Kuomintang
- International affiliation: International Young Democrat Union
- Website: Official Facebook page

Flag

The Kuomintang Youth League (Chinese: 中國國民黨青年團; pinyin: Zhōngguó Guómíndǎng Qīngniántuán), also known as Young KMT, is a youth group under the Kuomintang. The Kuomintang Youth League was created in 2006 by Kuomintang chairman Ma Ying-jeou to help promote cultural and political awareness among Chinese youths. The Kuomintang Youth League now has numerous chapters spread throughout the sovereign lands of the Republic of China (Taiwan) and its extensive overseas network include many cities in the United States.

== History ==
Flag of the Three Principles of the People Youth League.

Another Kuomintang youth wing, the Three Principles of the People Youth Corps, existed from 1938 to 1947 under the patronage of the Blue Shirts Society, a secret ultranationalist faction of the Kuomintang. However, the Kuomintang Youth League is not directly descended from or related to this group; the Kuomintang Youth League was established in 2006 by Kuomintang Chairman Ma Ying-jeou.

== Overseas Extensions ==
The Kuomintang Youth League has a broad support group in the United States and Canada, especially in California. Local communities place this youth political organisation very high regard for their community service activities. The first overseas branch was formed in Los Angeles. The newest overseas addition of the Kuomintang Youth League was established in Victoria, British Columbia.

== List of leaders ==
Term	Name	School	Assumed office	Left office	Deputy	Premier
1	Lin Yi-shih	Non-attendant	2006/4/2	2007/8/1		
2	Huang Chi-chung	SHU	2007/8/1	2008/7/30		
3	Liang Chou	NCCU	2008/7/30	2009/10/11		
4	Chou Wei-yih	NCKU	2009/10/11	2010/9/26		
5	Huang Chien-hao	NCCU	2010/9/26	2011/9/25		Yin Wei
6	Shih Yi-chia	NTOU	2011/9/25	2012/9/5		Yin Wei
7	Ling Tao	NCTU	2012/9/5	2013/9/10		Yin Wei
8	Hsu Chiao-hsin	NCCU	2013/9/10	2014/9/11		Yin Wei
9	Alfred Lin Chia-hsing	NTU	2014/9/11	2015/9/22	Vacant	Lee Cheng-hao
10	Hsiao Ching-yen	SCU	2015/9/22	2016/9/24	Vacant	Lee Cheng-hao
11	Lyu Ching-wei	NTU	2016/9/24	2017/9/30	Five (including Chen Yu-bin)	Liou Kai-jung
12	Oliver Liou Yu-jou	NTU	2017/9/30	2018/10/1	Lu Hao-hsuan	Liou Kai-jung
13	Raymond Lee Cheng-yin	NTU	2018/10/1	2019/10/2	Vacant	Tsai Che-chen
14	Allen Tien Fang-lun	SHU	2019/10/2	2020/10/1	Vacant	Tsai Che-chen
15	Hank Chen Po-han	NTU	2020/10/1	2021/11/10	Ho Yuan-kai; Chen Min-chieh (resigned)	Tsai Che-chen
16	Thomas Liu Yih-hung	NCCU	2021/11/10	2022/11/08	Kang Chin-yu; Howard Shen Cheng-hao	Tsai Che-chen (till March 2022); Hsiao Yu-yun (from March 2022)
17	Kang Chin-yu	NTU	2022/11/09	Incumbent	Liu Bing-ruei; Sabrina Hung Yu-hsuan	Hsiao Yu-yun (till January 2023); Teng Kai-hsun (from January 2023)
18	Lo, Yung-sheng	NTU	2023/10/05	2024/09/25	Chang, Wen-yu (6/19 ~ 8/15 Temporarily left the position due to military service); Lin, Yun-hsi; Lai, Yu-jung; Huang, Teng-hsien	Teng Kai-hsun

== See also ==
- Communist Youth League of China
