= Kuomintang =

Kuomintang 中國國民黨 Zhōngguó Guómíndǎng Chungkuo Kuomintang
- Other name: Chinese Nationalist Party
- Abbreviation: KMT
- Eternal Premier: Sun Yat-sen
- Eternal Director-General: Chiang Kai-shek
- Chairperson: Cheng Li-wun
- Secretary-General: Lee Chien-lung
- Founder: Sun Yat-sen
- Founded: 24 November 1894; 131 years ago Honolulu, Hawaii (original form); 10 October 1919; 107 years ago Shanghai French Concession (current form)
- Preceded by: Revive China Society (1894); Tongmenghui (1905)
- Headquarters: No. 232–234, Sec. 2, Bade Rd., Zhongshan District, Taipei City 104
- Newspaper: Central Daily News
- Think tank: National Policy Foundation
- Youth wing: Kuomintang Youth League; Three Principles of the People Youth Corps (1938‍–‍1947)
- Education wing: Institute of Revolutionary Practice
- Military wing: National Revolutionary Army (1925‍–‍1947)
- Paramilitary wing: Blue Shirts Society (1932‍–‍1938)
- Membership: 6.88 million (1945); ▲451,174 (2022)
- Ideology: Chinese nationalism; Three Principles of the People; Conservatism (Taiwanese)
- Political position: Centre-right to right-wing; Historical: Big tent
- National affiliation: Pan-Blue Coalition
- Regional affiliation: Asia Pacific Democracy Union
- International affiliation: Centrist Democrat International; International Democracy Union
- Colours: Blue
- Anthem: "Three Principles of the People"
- Legislative Yuan: 52 / 113
- Municipal mayors: 4 / 6
- Magistrates/mayors: 10 / 16
- Councillors: 367 / 910
- Township/city mayors: 83 / 204

Party flag

Website
- kmt.org.tw

Kuomintang
- "Kuomintang" in traditional (top) and simplified (bottom) Chinese characters
- Traditional Chinese: 中國國民黨
- Simplified Chinese: 中国国民党
- Literal meaning: China Nationals' Party
Transcriptions
Standard Mandarin
- Hanyu Pinyin: Zhōngguó Guómíndǎng
- Bopomofo: ㄓㄨㄥ ㄍㄨㄛˊ ㄍㄨㄛˊ ㄇㄧㄣˊ ㄉㄤˇ
- Wade–Giles: Chung^{1}-kuo^{2} Kuo^{2}-min^{2}-tang^{3}
- IPA: [ʈʂʊ́ŋ.kwǒ kwǒ.mǐn.tàŋ]
other Mandarin
- Xiao'erjing: ﺟْﻮﻗُﻮَع ﻗُﻮَعمٍدْا
- Dungan: Җунгуй Гуймин Дон
Wu
- Romanization: tson^{平} koh^{入} koh^{入} min^{平} taon^{上}
Hakka
- Romanization: dung^{24} gued^{2} gued^{2} min^{11} dong^{31}
- Pha̍k-fa-sṳ: Dṳ̆ng-guók Guók-mìng-dōng
Yue: Cantonese
- Yale Romanization: Jūnggwok Gwokmàhndóng
- Jyutping: zung1 gwok3 gwok3 man4 dong2
- IPA: [tsʊŋ˥ kʷɔk̚˧ kʷɔk̚˧ mɐn˩ tɔŋ˧˥]
Southern Min
- Hokkien POJ: Tiong-kok Kok-bîn-tóng

Abbreviation
- Traditional Chinese: 國民黨
- Simplified Chinese: 国民党
- Literal meaning: Nationals' Party
Transcriptions
Standard Mandarin
- Hanyu Pinyin: Guómíndǎng
- Bopomofo: ㄍㄨㄛˊ ㄇㄧㄣˊ ㄉㄤˇ
- Gwoyeu Romatzyh: Gwomindaang
- Wade–Giles: Kuo^{2}-min^{2}-tang^{3}
- IPA: [kwǒ.mǐn.tàŋ]
other Mandarin
- Xiao'erjing: ﻗُﻮَعمٍدْا
Wu
- Romanization: koh^{入}min^{平}taon^{上}
Hakka
- Romanization: gued^{2}min^{11}dong^{31}
- Pha̍k-fa-sṳ: Guók-mìng-dōng
Yue: Cantonese
- Yale Romanization: Gwokmàhndóng
- Jyutping: gwok3 man4 dong2
- IPA: [kʷɔk̚˧ mɐn˩ tɔŋ˧˥]
Southern Min
- Hokkien POJ: Kok-bîn-tóng

The Kuomintang (KMT) (Note: In local languages: Traditional Chinese script: 中國國民黨; Mandarin Pinyin: Zhōngguó Guómíndǎng; Hokkien: Tiong-kok Kok-bîn-tóng; Sixian Hakka: Chûng-koet Koet-mìn-tóng; Matsu: Dṳ̆ng-guók Guók-mìng-dōng) (Note: Also written Guomindang (GMD), the Chinese Nationalist Party (CNP), the Nationalist Party of China (NPC), Nationalist Party, or the National People's Party of China (NPPC).) is a major political party in the Republic of China (Taiwan). It was the sole ruling party of China from 1928 to 1949 until its relocation to Taiwan, and in Taiwan ruled under martial law until 1987. The KMT is a centre-right to right-wing party and the largest in the Pan-Blue Coalition, one of Taiwan's two main political groups. Its primary rival is the Democratic Progressive Party (DPP), the largest party in the Pan-Green Coalition. As of 2025, the KMT is the largest single party in the Legislative Yuan and is chaired by Cheng Li-wun.

The party was founded by Sun Yat-sen in 1894 in Honolulu, Hawaii, as the Revive China Society. He reformed the party in 1919 in the Shanghai French Concession under its current name. From 1926 to 1928, the KMT under Chiang Kai-shek unified China in the Northern Expedition against regional warlords, leading to the fall of the Beiyang government. After initially allying with the Chinese Communist Party (CCP) in the First United Front, the party under Chiang purged communist members. It was the sole ruling party of China from 1928 to 1949 but gradually lost control while fighting the Empire of Japan in the Second Sino-Japanese War and the CCP in the Chinese Civil War. In December 1949, the Kuomintang retreated to Taiwan following its defeat by the communists.

From 1949 to 1987, the KMT ruled Taiwan as a one-party state after the February 28 incident. During this period (known as the White Terror), martial law was in effect and civil liberties were curtailed as part of its anti-communism efforts. The party oversaw Taiwan's rapid economic development but later experienced diplomatic setbacks, including the loss of the country's seat in the United Nations and loss of international diplomatic recognition to the CCP-led People's Republic of China (PRC) in the 1970s. In the late 1980s, party leader Chiang Ching-kuo lifted martial law and the ban on opposition parties. His successor, Lee Teng-hui, continued democratic reforms and was reelected in 1996 in the first direct presidential election. The 2000 presidential election ended 72 years of KMT presidencies. The party reclaimed power with the landslide victory of Ma Ying-jeou in the 2008 presidential election, then lost the presidency and its legislative majority in the 2016 election, but regained a legislative plurality in the 2024 election.

The party's guiding ideology is the Three Principles of the People, advocated by Sun Yat-sen and organized on a basis of democratic centralism. As the KMT supports the ROC as the only representative of China, it opposes both Chinese unification under the PRC and formal Taiwan independence. As the KMT opposes non-peaceful means to resolve the cross-strait disputes while still strongly adhering to the ROC constitution, the party favors a closer relationship with the PRC and accepts the 1992 Consensus, which defines both sides of the Taiwan Strait as "one China" but maintains its ambiguity to different interpretations. It seeks to maintain Taiwan's status quo rather than formal independence or unification.

== History ==
=== Founding and Sun Yat-sen era ===
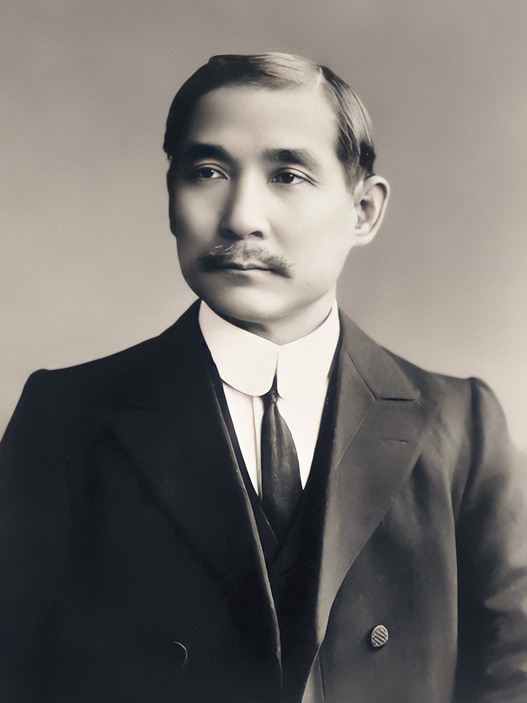
The KMT reveres its founder, Sun Yat-sen, as the "Father of the Nation"

The KMT traces its ideological and organizational roots to the work of the Chinese revolutionary Sun Yat-sen, a proponent of Chinese nationalism and democracy who founded the Revive China Society at the capital of the Republic of Hawaii, Honolulu, on 24 November 1894. On 20 August 1905, Sun joined forces with other anti-monarchist societies in Tokyo, Empire of Japan, to form the Tongmenghui, a group committed to overthrowing the Qing dynasty and establishing a republic in China.

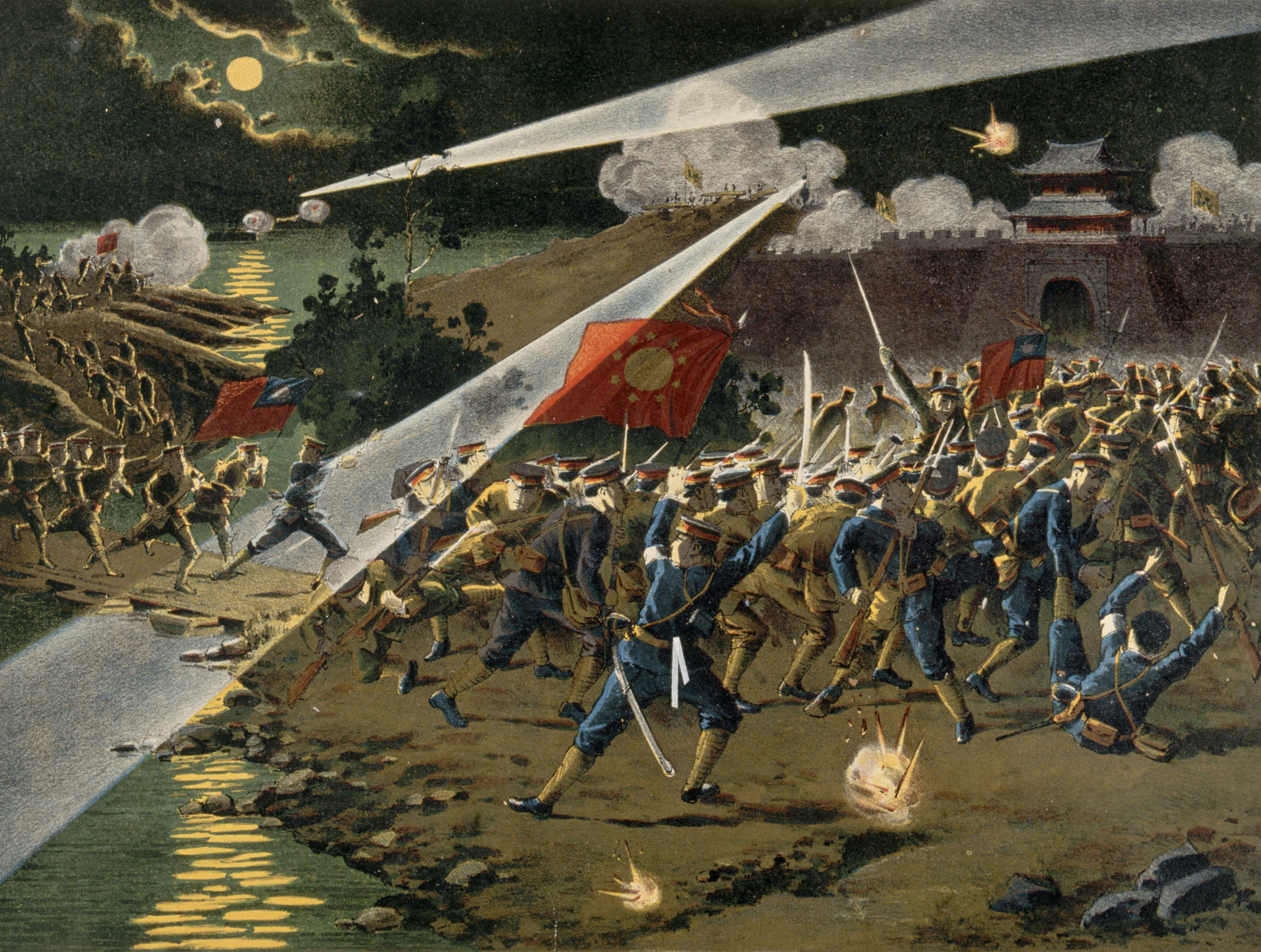
The Revolutionary Army attacking Nanjing in 1911

The group supported the Xinhai Revolution of 1911 and the founding of the Republic of China on 1 January 1912. Sun and the Tongmenghui are often depicted as the principal organizers of the Xinhai Revolution, but this is disputed by scholars who argue that the Revolution broke out in a leaderless and decentralized way and that Sun was only later elected provisional president of the new Chinese republic. However, Sun did not have military power and ceded the provisional presidency of the republic to Yuan Shikai, who arranged for the abdication of Puyi, the last Emperor, on 12 February.

On 25 August 1912, the Nationalist Party was established at the Huguang Guild Hall in Beijing, where the Tongmenghui and five smaller pro-revolution parties merged to contest the first national elections. Sun was chosen as the party chairman with Huang Xing as his deputy.

The most influential member of the party was the third-ranking Song Jiaoren, who mobilized mass support from gentry and merchants for the Nationalists to advocate a constitutional parliamentary democracy. The party opposed constitutional monarchists and sought to check the power of Yuan. The Nationalists won an overwhelming majority in the first National Assembly election in December 1912.

Yuan soon began to ignore the parliament in making presidential decisions. Song was assassinated in Shanghai in 1913. Members of the Nationalists, led by Sun Yat-sen, suspected that Yuan was behind the plot and thus staged the Second Revolution in July 1913, a poorly planned and ill-supported armed uprising to overthrow Yuan, which failed. In November, claiming subversion and betrayal, Yuan expelled KMT adherents from parliament and dissolved the Nationalists, whose members had largely fled into exile in Japan. In early 1914, he dismissed the parliament.

Yuan proclaimed himself emperor in December 1915. While exiled in Japan, Sun established the Chinese Revolutionary Party on 8 July 1914, but many of his old revolutionary comrades, including Huang Xing, Wang Jingwei, Hu Hanmin, and Chen Jiongming, refused to join him or support his efforts in inciting armed uprising against Yuan. To join the Revolutionary Party, members had to take an oath of personal loyalty to Sun, which many old revolutionaries regarded as undemocratic and contrary to the spirit of the revolution. As a result, he became largely sidelined within the Republican movement during this period.

Sun returned to China in 1917 to establish a military junta at Canton to oppose the Beiyang government but was soon forced out of office and exiled to Shanghai. There, with renewed support, he resurrected the KMT on 10 October 1919, under the name Kuomintang of China (中國國民黨) and established its headquarters in Canton in 1920.

In 1923, the KMT and its Canton government accepted aid from the Soviet Union after being denied recognition by the western powers. Soviet advisers—the most prominent of whom was Mikhail Borodin, an agent of the Comintern—arrived in China in 1923 to aid in the reorganization and consolidation of the KMT along the lines of the Russian Communist Party (Bolsheviks), establishing a Leninist party structure that lasted into the 1990s. The Chinese Communist Party (CCP) was under Comintern instructions to cooperate with the KMT, and its members were encouraged to join while maintaining their separate party identities, forming the First United Front between the two parties. Mao Zedong and early members of the CCP also joined the KMT in 1923.

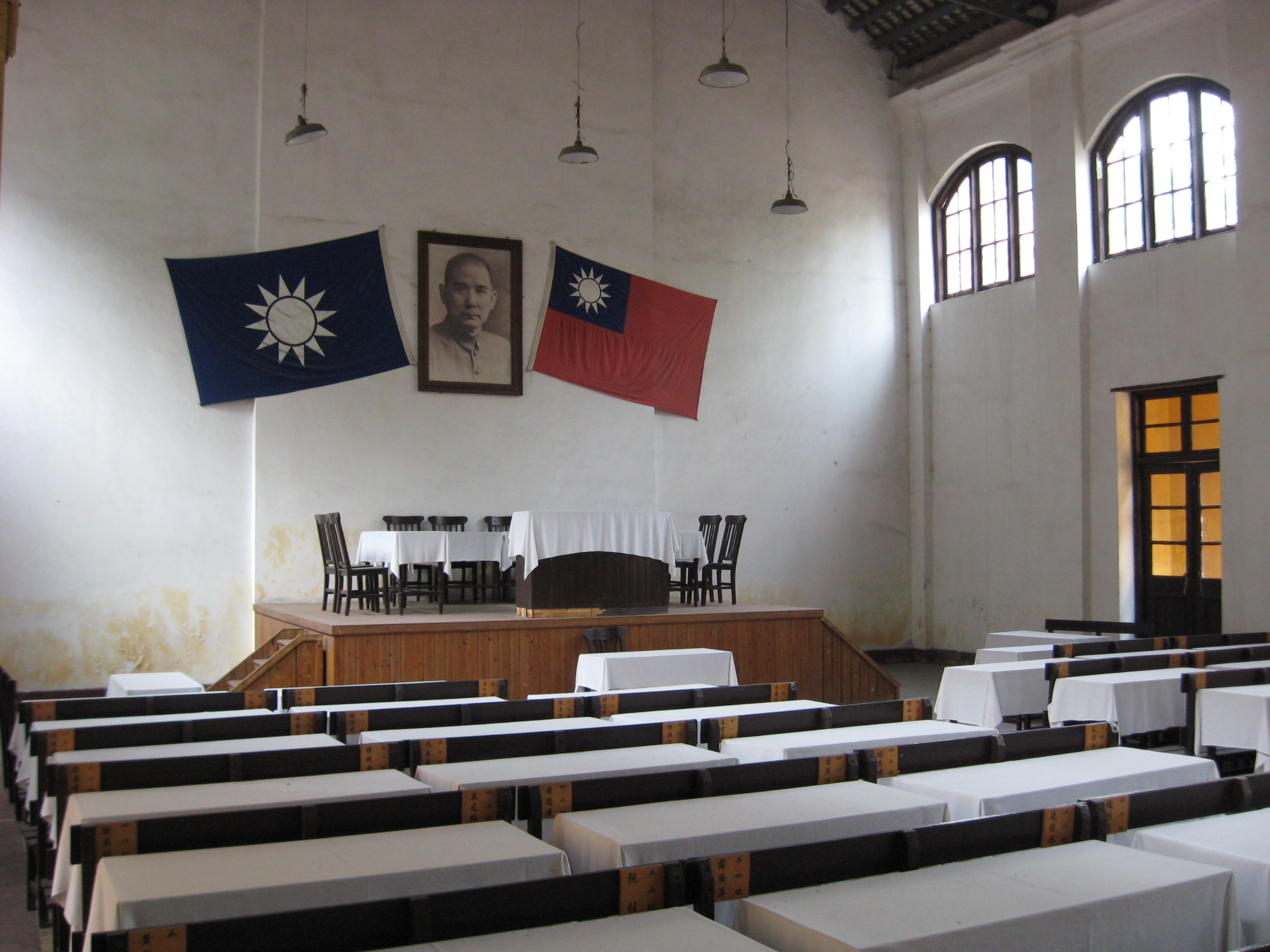
Venue of the 1st National Congress of Kuomintang in 1924

Soviet advisers also helped the KMT to set up a political institute to train propagandists in mass mobilization techniques, and in 1923 Chiang Kai-shek, one of Sun's lieutenants from the Tongmenghui days, was sent to Moscow for several months' military and political study. At the first party congress in 1924 in Guangzhou, which included non-KMT delegates such as members of the CCP, they adopted Sun's political theory, which included the Three Principles of the People: nationalism, democracy, and people's livelihood.

=== Under Chiang Kai-shek in mainland China ===
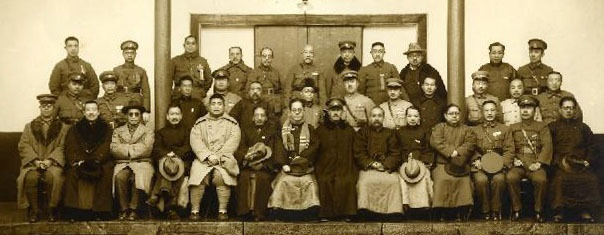
Closing ceremony of the National Army Reorganization and Disbandment Conference at National Government compound, Nanjing, January 25, 1929.

When Sun Yat-sen died in 1925, the political leadership of the KMT fell to Wang Jingwei ("Reorganization Group") and Hu Hanmin ("Western Hills Group"), respectively the left-wing and right-wing leaders of the party. However, the real power was in the hands of Chiang Kai-shek, who was in near complete control of the military as the superintendent of the Whampoa Military Academy. With their military superiority, the KMT confirmed their rule on Canton, the provincial capital of Guangdong. The Guangxi warlords pledged loyalty to the KMT. The KMT now became a rival government in opposition to the warlord Beiyang government based in Beijing.

Chiang assumed leadership of the KMT on 6 July 1926. Unlike Sun Yat-sen, whom he admired greatly and who forged all his political, economic, and revolutionary ideas primarily from what he had learned in Hawaii and indirectly through Hong Kong and Japan under the Meiji Restoration, Chiang knew relatively little about the West. He also studied in Japan, but he was firmly rooted in his ancient Han Chinese identity and was steeped in Chinese culture. As his life progressed, he became increasingly attached to ancient Chinese culture and traditions. His few trips to the West confirmed his pro-ancient Chinese outlook and he studied the ancient Chinese classics and ancient Chinese history assiduously. In 1923, after the formation of the First United Front, Sun Yat-sen sent Chiang to spend three months in Moscow studying the political and military system of the Soviet Union. Although Chiang did not follow the Soviet Communist doctrine, he, like the Communist Party, sought to destroy warlordism and foreign imperialism in China, and upon his return established the Whampoa Military Academy near Guangzhou, following the Soviet Model.

Chiang was also particularly committed to Sun's idea of "political tutelage". Sun believed that the only hope for a unified and better China lay in a military conquest, followed by a period of political tutelage that would culminate in the transition to democracy. Using this ideology, Chiang built himself into the dictator of the Republic of China, both in mainland China and after the national government relocated to Taiwan.

Following the death of Sun Yat-sen, Chiang Kai-shek emerged as the KMT leader and launched the Northern Expedition to defeat the northern warlords and unite China under the party. With its power confirmed in the southeast, the Nationalist Government appointed Chiang Kai-shek commander-in-chief of the National Revolutionary Army (NRA), and the Northern Expedition to suppress the warlords began. Chiang had to defeat three separate warlords and two independent armies. Chiang, with Soviet supplies, conquered the southern half of China in nine months.

A split erupted between the Chinese Communist Party and the KMT, which threatened the Northern Expedition. Wang Jing Wei, who led the KMT leftist allies, took the city of Wuhan in January 1927. With the support of the Soviet agent Mikhail Borodin, Wang declared the National Government as having moved to Wuhan. Having taken Nanjing in March, Chiang halted his campaign and prepared a violent break with Wang and his communist allies. Chiang's expulsion of the CCP and their Soviet advisers, marked by the Shanghai massacre on 12 April, led to the beginning of the Chinese Civil War. Wang finally surrendered his power to Chiang. Once this split had been healed, Chiang resumed his Northern Expedition and managed to take Shanghai.

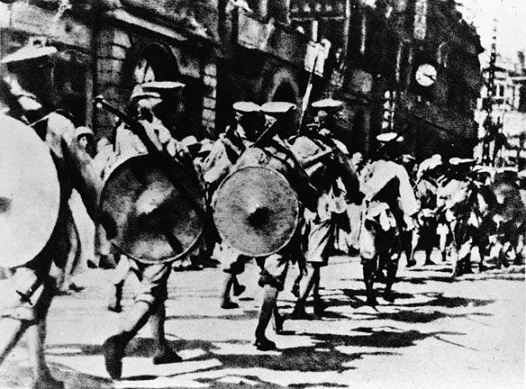
The National Revolutionary Army soldiers marched into the British concessions in Hankou during the Northern Expedition

During the Nanjing incident in March 1927, the NRA stormed the consulates of the United States, the United Kingdom and Imperial Japan, looted foreign properties and almost assassinated the Japanese consul. An American, two British, one French, an Italian and a Japanese were killed. These looters also stormed and seized millions of dollars' worth of British concessions in Hankou, refusing to hand them back to the UK government. Both Nationalists and Communist soldiers within the army participated in the rioting and looting of foreign residents in Nanjing.

NRA took Beijing in 1928. The city was the internationally recognized capital, even when it was previously controlled by warlords. This event allowed the KMT to receive widespread diplomatic recognition in the same year. The capital was moved from Beijing to Nanjing, the original capital of the Ming dynasty, and thus a symbolic purge of the final Qing elements. This period of KMT rule in China between 1927 and 1937 was relatively stable and prosperous and is still known as the Nanjing decade.

After the Northern Expedition in 1928, the Nationalist government under the KMT declared that China had been exploited for decades under the unequal treaties signed between the foreign powers and the Qing dynasty. The KMT government demanded that the foreign powers renegotiate the treaties on equal terms.

Before the Northern Expedition, the KMT began as a heterogeneous group advocating American-inspired federalism and provincial autonomy. However, the KMT under Chiang's leadership aimed at establishing a centralized one-party state with one ideology. This was even more evident following Sun's elevation into a cult figure after his death. The control by one single party began the period of "political tutelage", whereby the party was to lead the government while instructing the people on how to participate in a democratic system. The topic of reorganizing the army, brought up at a military conference in 1929, sparked the Central Plains War. The cliques, some of them former warlords, demanded to retain their army and political power within their own territories. Although Chiang finally won the war, the conflicts among the cliques would have a devastating effect on the survival of the KMT. Muslim Generals in Gansu waged war against the Guominjun in favor of the KMT during the conflict in Gansu in 1927–1930.

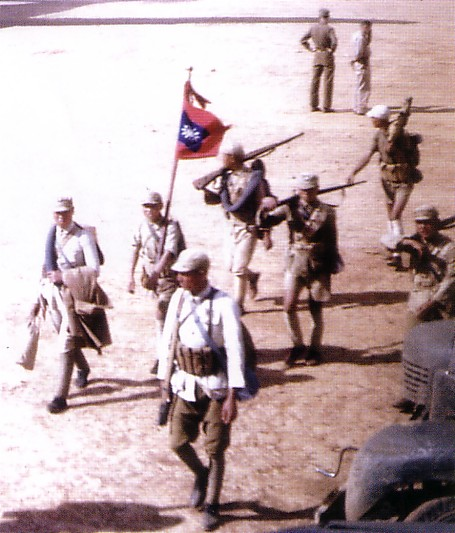
Nationalist soldiers during the Second Sino-Japanese War

In 1931, Japanese aggression resumed with the Mukden Incident and occupation of Manchuria, and the CCP founded the Chinese Soviet Republic (CSR) in Jiangxi while secretly recruiting within the KMT government and military. Chiang was alarmed by the expansion of communist influence; he wanted to suppress internal conflicts before confronting foreign aggression. The KMT were aided by German military advisors. The CSR was destroyed in 1934 after a series of KMT offensives. The communists abandoned bases in southeast China for Shaanxi in a military retreat called the Long March; less than 10% of the communist army survived. A new base, the Shaan-Gan-Ning Border Region, was created with Soviet aid.

KMT secret police persecuted suspected communists and political opponents with terror. In The Birth of Communist China, C.P. Fitzgerald describes China under the rule of the KMT thus: "the Chinese people groaned under a regime Fascist in every quality except efficiency."

In 1936, Chiang was kidnapped by Zhang Xueliang in the Xi'an Incident and forced into the Second United Front, an anti-Japanese alliance with the CCP; the Second Sino-Japanese War started the following year. The alliance brought little coordination and was treated as a temporary cease fire in the civil war. The New Fourth Army incident in 1941 ended the alliance.

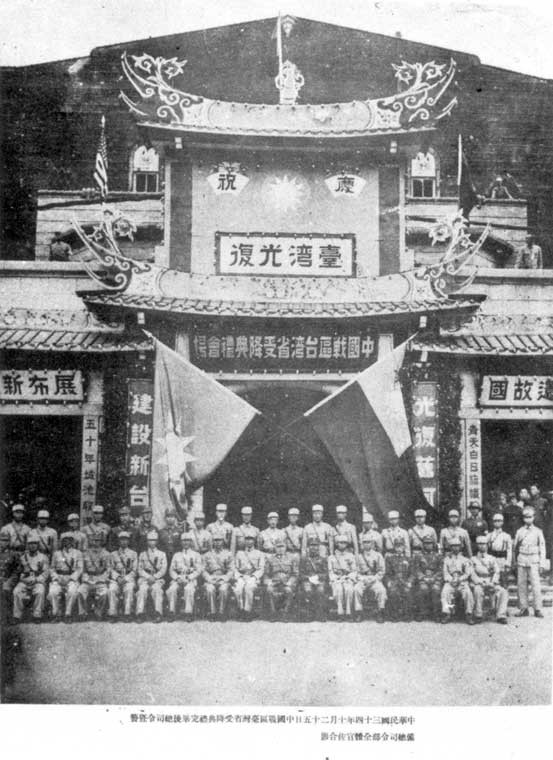
The retrocession of Taiwan in Taipei on 25 October 1945

Japan surrendered in 1945, and Taiwan was returned to the Republic of China on 25 October of that year. The brief period of celebration was soon shadowed by the possibility of a civil war between the KMT and CCP. The Soviet Union declared war on Japan just before it surrendered and occupied Manchuria, the north eastern part of China. The Soviet Union denied the KMT army the right to enter the region but allowed the CCP to take control of the Japanese factories and their supplies.

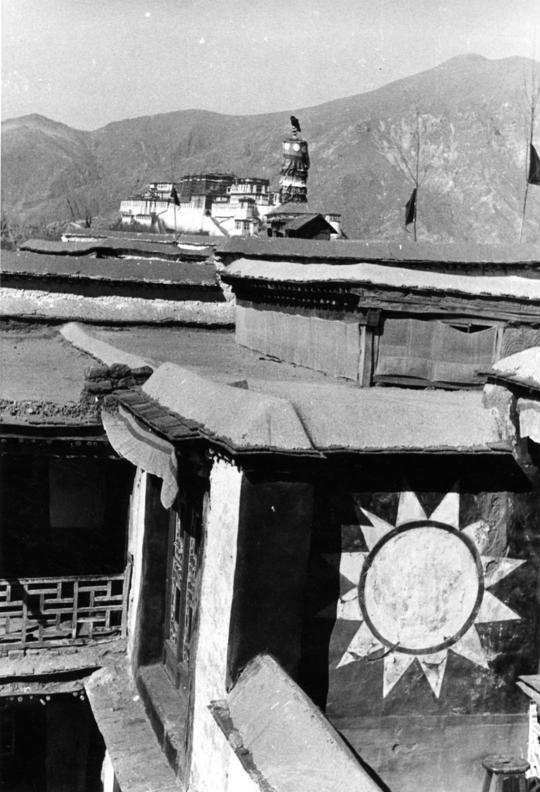
KMT flag displayed in Lhasa, Tibet in 1938

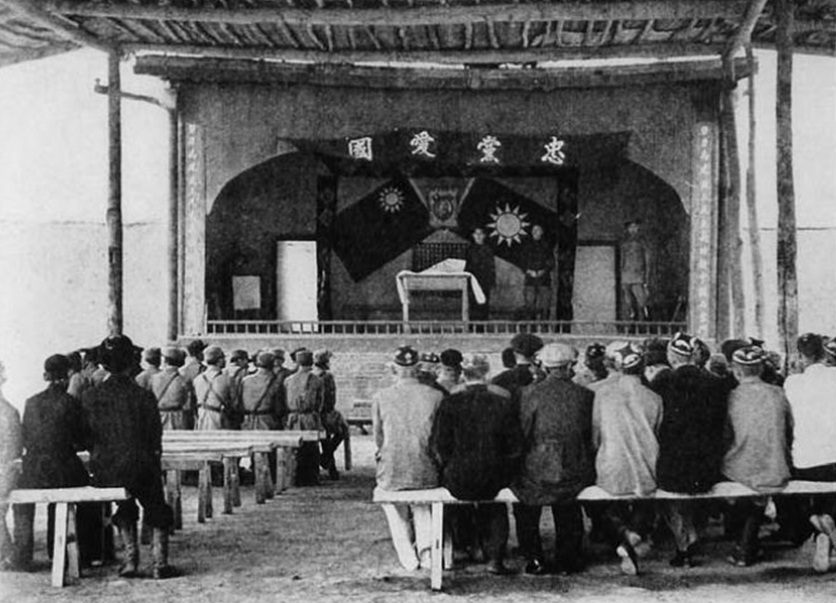
The KMT in Tihwa (Ürümqi), Xinjiang in 1942

Full-scale civil war between the Communists and the Nationalists erupted in 1946. The Communist Chinese armies, the People's Liberation Army (PLA), previously a minor faction, grew rapidly in influence and power due to several errors on the KMT's part. First, the KMT reduced troop levels precipitously after the Japanese surrender, leaving large numbers of able-bodied, trained fighting men who became unemployed and disgruntled with the KMT as prime recruits for the PLA.

Secondly, the KMT government proved thoroughly unable to manage the economy, allowing the hyperinflation in China to go uncontrolled in the late 1930s. Among the most despised and ineffective efforts it undertook to contain inflation was the conversion to the gold standard for the national treasury and the Chinese gold yuan in August 1948, outlawing private ownership of gold, silver and foreign exchange, collecting all such precious metals and foreign exchange from the people and issuing the Gold Standard Scrip in exchange. As most farmland in the north were under CCP's control, the cities governed by the KMT lacked food supply and this added to the hyperinflation. The new scrip became worthless in only ten months and greatly reinforced the nationwide perception of the KMT as a corrupt or at best inept entity. Third, Chiang Kai-shek ordered his forces to defend the urbanized cities. This decision gave CCP a chance to move freely through the countryside. At first, the KMT had the edge with the aid of weapons and ammunition from the United States (US). But with the country suffering from hyperinflation, widespread corruption, and other economic ills, the KMT continued to lose popular support. Some leading officials and military leaders of the KMT hoarded material, armament and military-aid funding provided by the US. This became a hindrance to its relationship with US government. US President Harry S. Truman wrote, "the Chiangs, the Kungs and the Soongs [were] all thieves", having taken $750 million in US aid.

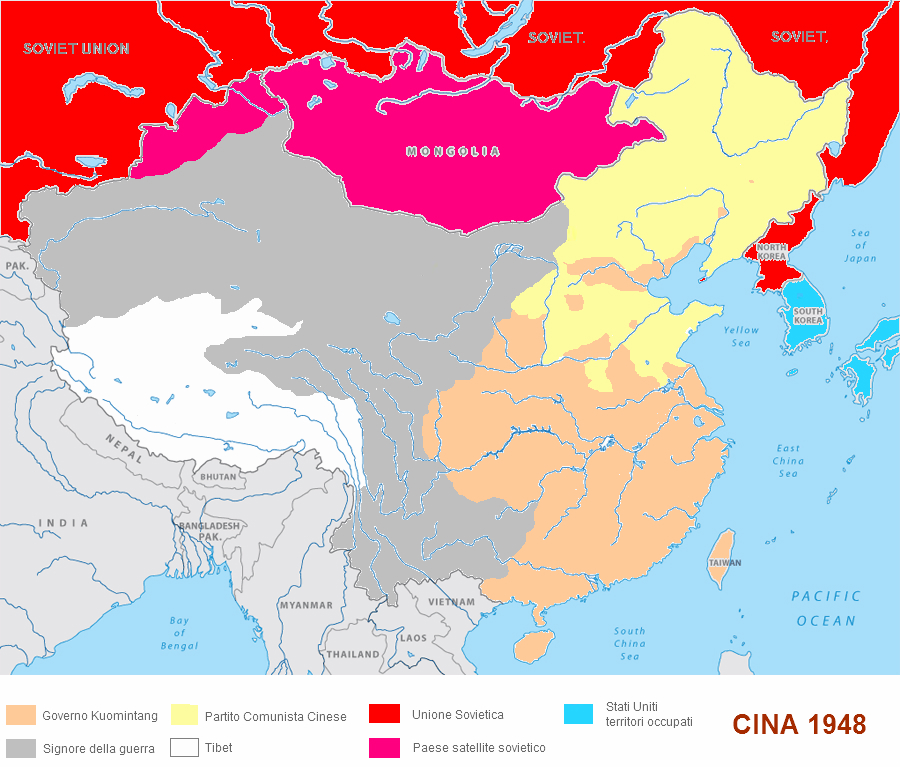
Territories under the control of the Kuomintang/warlords (orange/grey) and communists (yellow) in 1948

At the same time, the suspension of American aid and tens of thousands of deserted or decommissioned soldiers being recruited to the PLA cause tipped the balance of power quickly to the CCP side, and the overwhelming popular support for the CCP in most of the country made it all but impossible for KMT forces to carry out successful assaults against the Communists.

By the end of 1949, the CCP controlled almost all of mainland China, as the KMT retreated to Taiwan with a significant amount of China's national treasure and 2 million people, including military forces and refugees. Some party members stayed in the mainland and broke away from the main KMT to found the Revolutionary Committee of the Kuomintang (also known as the Left Kuomintang), which is still one of the eight minor registered parties of the People's Republic of China.

=== In Taiwan: 1945–present ===
In 1895, Formosa (now called Taiwan), including the Penghu islands, became a Japanese colony via the Treaty of Shimonoseki following the First Sino-Japanese War.

After Japan's defeat at the end of World War II in 1945, General Order No. 1 instructed Japan to surrender its troops in Taiwan to Chiang Kai-shek. On 25 October 1945, KMT general Chen Yi acted on behalf of the Allied Powers to accept Japan's surrender and proclaimed that day as Taiwan Retrocession Day.

Tensions between the local Taiwanese and mainlanders from mainland China increased in the intervening years, culminating in a flashpoint on 27 February 1947 in Taipei when a dispute between a female cigarette vendor and an anti-smuggling officer in front of Tianma Tea House triggered civil disorder and protests that would last for days. The uprising turned bloody and was shortly put down by the ROC Army in the February 28 Incident. As a result of the 28 February Incident in 1947, Taiwanese people endured the "White Terror", a KMT-led political repression that resulted in the death or disappearance of over 30,000 Taiwanese intellectuals, activists, and people suspected of opposition to the KMT.

Following the establishment of the People's Republic of China (PRC) on 1 October 1949, the commanders of the People's Liberation Army (PLA) believed that Kinmen and Matsu had to be taken before a final assault on Taiwan. The KMT fought the Battle of Guningtou on 25–27 October 1949 and stopped the PLA invasion. The KMT headquarters were set up on 10 December 1949 at No. 11 Zhongshan South Road. In 1950, Chiang took office in Taipei under the Temporary Provisions Effective During the Period of Communist Rebellion. The provision declared martial law in Taiwan and halted some democratic processes, including presidential and parliamentary elections, until the mainland could be recovered from the CCP. The KMT estimated it would take three years to defeat the Communists. The slogan was "prepare in the first year, start fighting in the second, and conquer in the third year." Chiang also initiated the Project National Glory to retake the mainland in 1965, but dropped it in 1972 after many unsuccessful attempts. Various factors, including international pressure, are believed to have prevented the KMT from militarily engaging the CCP full-scale. The KMT backed Muslim insurgents formerly belonging to the National Revolutionary Army during the KMT Islamic insurgency in 1950–1958 in mainland China. A cold war with a couple of minor military conflicts resulted in the early years. The various government bodies previously in Nanjing that were reestablished in Taipei as the KMT-controlled government actively claimed sovereignty over all China. The Republic of China in Taiwan retained China's seat in the United Nations until 1971 as well as recognition by the United States until 1979.

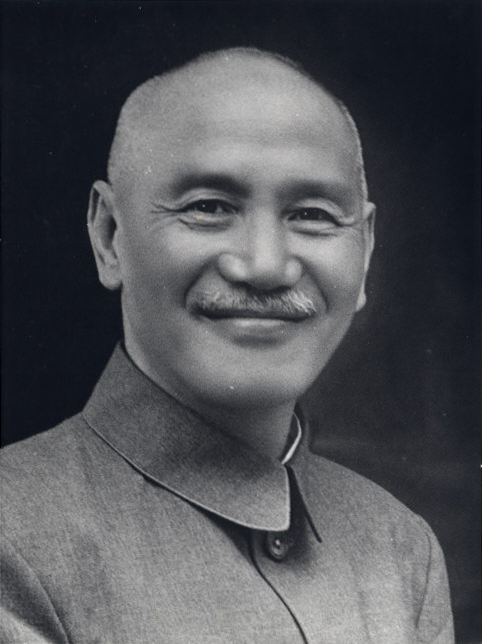
Official portrait of President Chiang Kai-shek of the Republic of China, 1955

In response to widespread corruption, factionalism, and bureaucratic inefficiency that had plagued the KMT and were viewed as key contributors to its defeat in the Chinese Civil War, Chiang Kai-shek initiated a sweeping modernization campaign, the Party Reform Program, between 1950 and 1952. The reform aimed to consolidate party discipline and centralize authority under Chiang's leadership. The campaign was led by the newly established Central Reform Committee, which sought to eliminate defeatism, factionalism, bureaucratism, and dependency within the party ranks. It also emphasized institutionalization, organizational cohesion, and the transformation of party culture. At the KMT's National Congress in October 1952, Chiang declared the reform a success. As a result, the party charter was amended to redefine the KMT as a revolutionary democratic party, drawing its social base from youth, intellectuals, and the working and agricultural classes while positioning patriotic revolutionaries among these classes as the core of party membership. The program marginalized rival factions such as the CC Clique, paving the way for the rise of figures like Chen Cheng and later Chiang Ching-kuo, who dominated party leadership in the decades to come.

Until the 1970s, the KMT continued land reforms, developed the economy, implemented a democratic system in a lower level of the government, improved relations between Taiwan and the mainland and created the Taiwan economic miracle. The KMT controlled the government under a one-party authoritarian state until reforms in the late 1970s through the 1990s. The ROC in Taiwan was once synonymous with the KMT and known simply as Nationalist China after its ruling party. In the 1970s, the KMT began to allow for "supplemental elections" in Taiwan to fill the seats of the aging representatives in the National Assembly.

Although opposition parties were not permitted, the pro-democracy movement Tangwai ("outside the KMT") created the Democratic Progressive Party (DPP) on 28 September 1986. Outside observers of Taiwanese politics expected the KMT to clamp down and crush the illegal opposition party, but this did not occur, and instead the party's formation marked the beginning of Taiwan's democratization.

Martial law ceased in 1987 and the President Lee Teng-hui terminated the Temporary Provisions Effective During the Period of Communist Rebellion in 1991. All parties started to be allowed to compete at all levels of elections, including the presidential election. Lee Teng-hui, the ROC's first democratically elected president and the leader of the KMT during the 1990s, announced his advocacy of "special state-to-state relations" with the PRC. The PRC associated this idea with Taiwan independence.

The KMT faced a split that led to the formation of the New Party in August 1993, alleged to be a result of Lee's "corruptive ruling style". After Lee was purged, the New Party largely reintegrated into the KMT. A much more serious split in the party occurred as a result of the 2000 presidential election. Upset at the choice of Lien Chan as the party's presidential nominee, former party Secretary-General James Soong launched an independent bid, which resulted in the expulsion of Soong and his supporters and the formation of the People First Party (PFP) on 31 March 2000. The KMT candidate placed third behind Soong in the elections. After the election, Lee's strong relationship with the opponent became apparent. To prevent defections to the PFP, Lien moved the party away from Lee's pro-independence policies and became friendlier to Chinese unification. This led to Lee's expulsion from the party and the formation of the Taiwan Solidarity Union (TSU) by Lee supporters on 24 July 2001.

Before that, the party's voters had defected to both the PFP and TSU, and the KMT did poorly in the December 2001 legislative elections and lost its position as the largest party in the Legislative Yuan. But the party did well in the 2002 mayoral and council elections, with Ma Ying-jeou, its candidate for Taipei mayor, reelected by a landslide and its candidate for Kaohsiung mayor narrowly losing but doing surprisingly well. Since 2002, the KMT and PFP have coordinated electoral strategies. In 2004, the KMT and PFP ran a joint presidential ticket, with Lien running for president and Soong for vice-president.

The loss of the presidential election of 2004 to DPP President Chen Shui-bian by merely over 30,000 votes was a bitter disappointment to party members, leading to large scale rallies for several weeks protesting alleged electoral fraud and the "odd circumstances" of the shooting of President Chen. However, the fortunes of the party were greatly improved when the KMT did well in the legislative elections held in December 2004 by maintaining its support in southern Taiwan achieving a majority for the Pan-Blue Coalition.

Soon after the election, there appeared to be a falling out with the KMT's junior partner, the People First Party and talk of a merger seemed to have ended. This split appeared to widen in early 2005, as the leader of the PFP, James Soong appeared to be reconciling with President Chen Shui-Bian and the Democratic Progressive Party. Many PFP members including legislators and municipal leaders have since defected to the KMT, and the PFP is seen as a fading party.

In 2005, Ma Ying-jeou became KMT chairman defeating speaker Wang Jin-pyng in the first public election for KMT chairmanship. The KMT won a decisive victory in the 3-in-1 local elections of December 2005, replacing the DPP as the largest party at the local level. This was seen as a major victory for the party ahead of legislative elections in 2007. There were elections for the two municipalities of the ROC, Taipei and Kaohsiung in December 2006. The KMT won a clear victory in Taipei, but lost to the DPP in the southern city of Kaohsiung by the slim margin of 1,100 votes.

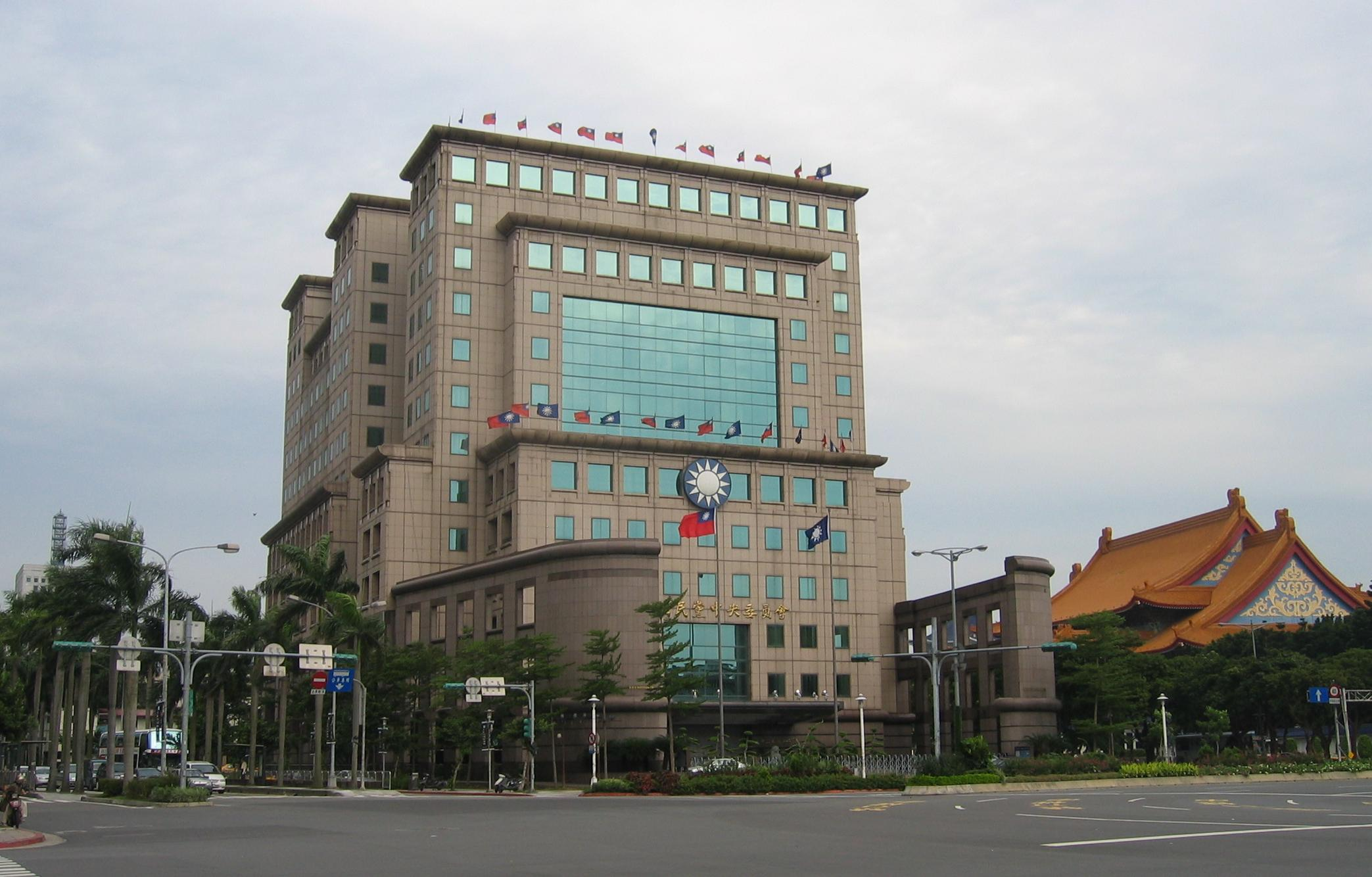
The former KMT headquarters in Taipei City (1949–2006), whose imposing structure, directly facing the Presidential Office Building, was seen as a symbol of the party's wealth and dominance

On 13 February 2007, Ma was indicted by the Taiwan High Prosecutors Office on charges of allegedly embezzling approximately NT$11 million (US$339,000), regarding the issue of "special expenses" while he was mayor of Taipei. Shortly after the indictment, he submitted his resignation as KMT chairman at the same press conference at which he formally announced his candidacy for ROC president. Ma argued that it was customary for officials to use the special expense fund for personal expenses undertaken in the course of their official duties. In December 2007, Ma was acquitted of all charges and immediately filed suit against the prosecutors. In 2008, the KMT won a landslide victory in the Republic of China presidential election on 22 March 2008. The KMT fielded former Taipei mayor and former KMT chairman Ma Ying-jeou to run against the DPP's Frank Hsieh. Ma won by a margin of 17% against Hsieh. Ma took office on 20 May 2008, with vice-presidential candidate Vincent Siew, and ended 8 years of the DPP presidency. The KMT also won a landslide victory in the 2008 legislative elections, winning 81 of 113 seats, or 71.7% of seats in the Legislative Yuan. These two elections gave the KMT firm control of both the executive and legislative yuans.

On 25 June 2009, Ma launched a bid to regain the KMT leadership and registered as the sole candidate for the chairmanship election. On 26 July, Ma won 93.9% of the vote, becoming the new chairman of the KMT, taking office on 17 October 2009. This officially allowed Ma to meet with Xi Jinping, the General Secretary of the Chinese Communist Party, and other PRC delegates, as he represented the KMT as leader of a Chinese political party rather than as head-of-state of a political entity unrecognized by the PRC.

On 29 November 2014, the KMT suffered a heavy loss in the local election to the DPP, winning only 6 municipalities and counties, down from 14 in the previous election in 2009 and 2010. Ma Ying-jeou resigned from the party chairmanship on 3 December and was replaced by acting Chairman Wu Den-yih. Chairmanship election was held on 17 January 2015 and Eric Chu was elected. He was inaugurated on 19 February. In September 2021, KMT elected its former leader Eric Chu to replace Johnny Chiang. In January 2024, no party won a majority in Taiwan's legislative election for the first time since 2004, with 51 seats for the DPP, 52 for the KMT, and eight for the TPP.

=== Current issues and challenges ===
==== Party assets ====
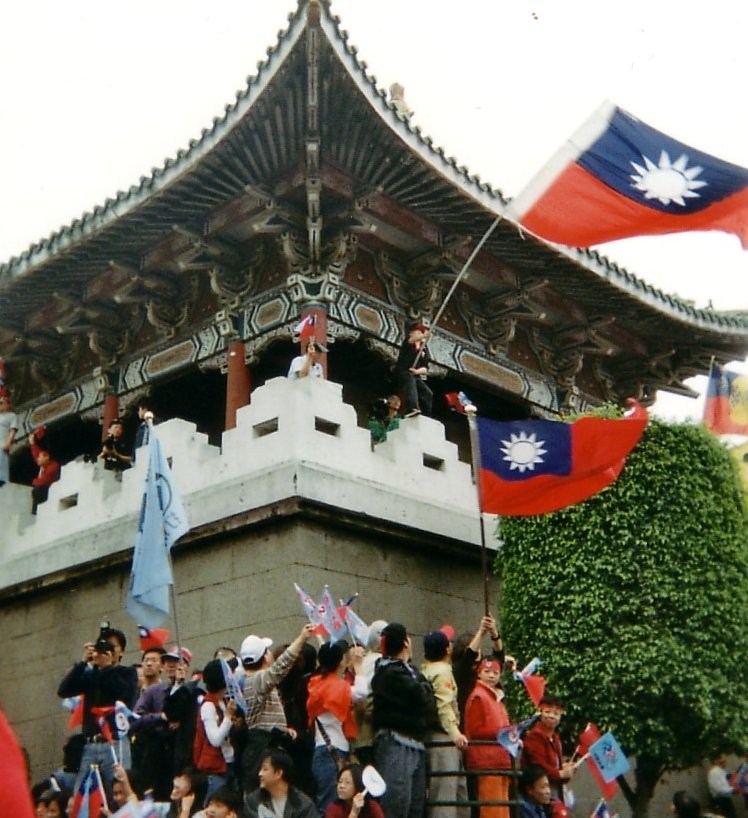
Pan-blue supporters at a rally during the 2004 presidential election

Upon arriving in Taiwan the KMT occupied assets previously owned by the Japanese and forced local businesses to make contributions directly to the KMT. Some of this real estate and other assets was distributed to party loyalists, but most of it remained with the party, as did the profits generated by the properties.

As the ruling party on Taiwan, the KMT amassed a vast business empire of banks, investment companies, petrochemical firms, and television and radio stations, thought to have made it the world's richest political party, with assets once estimated to be around US$2–10 billion. Although this war chest appeared to help the KMT until the mid-1990s, it later led to accusations of corruption (often referred to as "black gold").

After 2000, the KMT's financial holdings appeared to be more of a liability than a benefit, and the KMT started to divest itself of its assets. However, the transactions were not disclosed and the whereabouts of the money earned from selling assets (if it has gone anywhere) is unknown. There were accusations in the 2004 presidential election that the KMT retained assets that were illegally acquired. During the 2000–2008 DPP presidency, a law was proposed by the DPP in the Legislative Yuan to recover illegally acquired party assets and return them to the government. However, due to the DPP's lack of control of the legislative chamber at the time, it never materialized.

The KMT also acknowledged that part of its assets were acquired through extra-legal means and thus promised to "retro-endow" them to the government. However, the quantity of the assets which should be classified as illegal are still under heated debate. DPP, in its capacity as ruling party from 2000 to 2008, claimed that there is much more that the KMT has yet to acknowledge. Also, the KMT actively sold assets under its title to quench its recent financial difficulties, which the DPP argues is illegal. Former KMT chairman Ma Ying-Jeou's position is that the KMT will sell some of its properties at below market rates rather than return them to the government and that the details of these transactions will not be publicly disclosed.

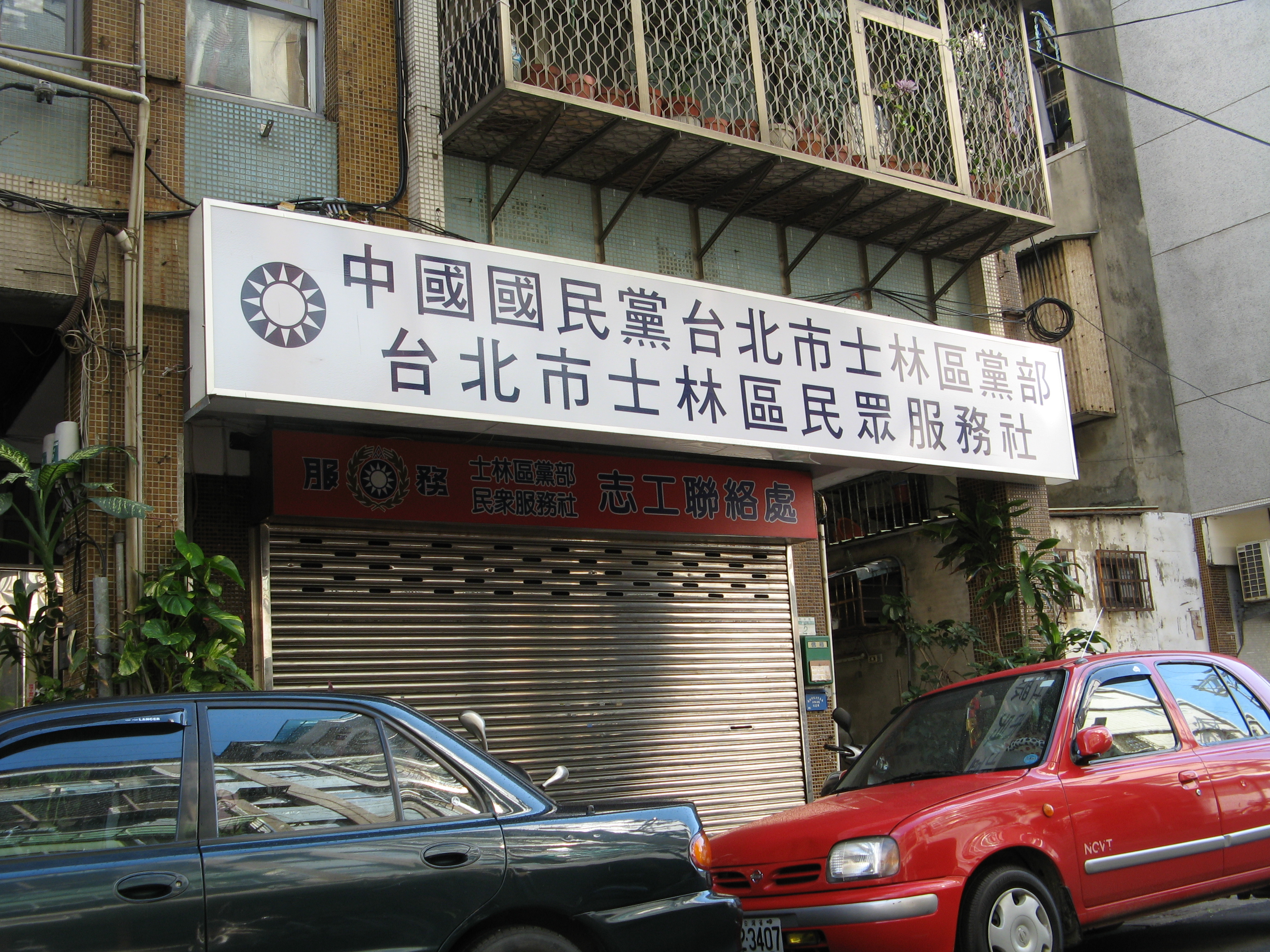
Kuomintang public service center in Shilin, Taipei

In 2006, the KMT sold its headquarters at 11 Zhongshan South Road in Taipei to Evergreen Group for NT$2.3 billion (US$96 million). The KMT moved into a smaller building on Bade Road in the eastern part of the city.

In July 2014, the KMT reported total assets of NT$26.8 billion (US$892.4 million) and interest earnings of NT$981.52 million for the year of 2013, making it one of the richest political parties in the world.

In August 2016, the Ill-gotten Party Assets Settlement Committee was set up by the ruling DPP government to investigate KMT party assets acquired during the martial law period and recover those that were determined to be illegally acquired.

== Supporter base ==
Support for the KMT in Taiwan encompasses a wide range of social groups but is largely determined by age. KMT support is concentrated in northern Taiwan in urban areas, where it draws its backing from big businesses due to its policy of maintaining commercial links with mainland China. As of 2020, only 3% of KMT members are under 40 years of age.

The KMT also has some support in the labor sector because of the many labor benefits and insurance implemented while the KMT was in power. The KMT traditionally has strong cooperation with military officers and veterans, teachers, and government workers. Among ethnic groups in Taiwan, the KMT has stronger support among mainlanders and their descendants for ideological and ethnic reasons and among some Taiwanese indigenous peoples who do not agree with the Pan-Green political pandering. The support for the KMT generally tend to be stronger in majority-Hakka and Mandarin-speaking counties of Taiwan, in contrast to the Hokkien-majority southwestern counties that tend to support the Democratic Progressive Party.

Hostility between indigenous communities and (Taiwanese) Hoklo and the indigenous communities' robust KMT networks both contribute to the indigenous tendency to vote for the KMT and their skepticism towards the Democratic Progressive Party (DPP). Indigenous peoples have criticized politicians for abusing the "indigenization" movement for political gains, such as indigenous opposition to the DPP's "rectification" by recognizing the Taroko people for political reasons, with the majority of mountain townships voting for Ma Ying-jeou. In 2005 the Kuomintang displayed a massive photo of the anti-Japanese Seediq leader Mona Rudao at its headquarters in honor of the 60th anniversary of Taiwan's retrocession from Japan to the Republic of China.

On social issues, the KMT does not take an official position on same-sex marriage, though most members of legislative committees, mayors of cities, and the 2020 presidential candidate Han Kuo-yu oppose it. The party does, however, have a small faction that supports same-sex marriage, consisting mainly of young people and residents of the Taipei metropolitan area. The opposition to same-sex marriage comes mostly from Christian groups, who wield significant political influence within the KMT. The party also supports marriages between mainland Chinese and Taiwanese in an attempt to preserve Chinese culture in Taiwan, although not without controversies over assimilation and espionage.

== Organization ==
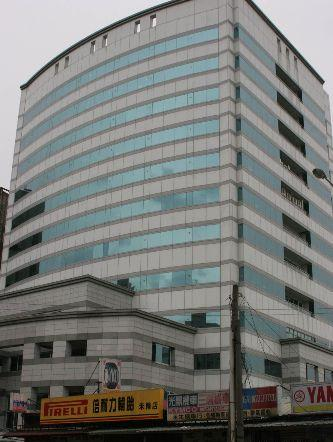
Bade building in Taipei City, before becoming the KMT headquarters. The KMT Central Committee sold the original headquarters to private investors of the EVA Airways Corporation, and moved to this more modest building in June 2006.

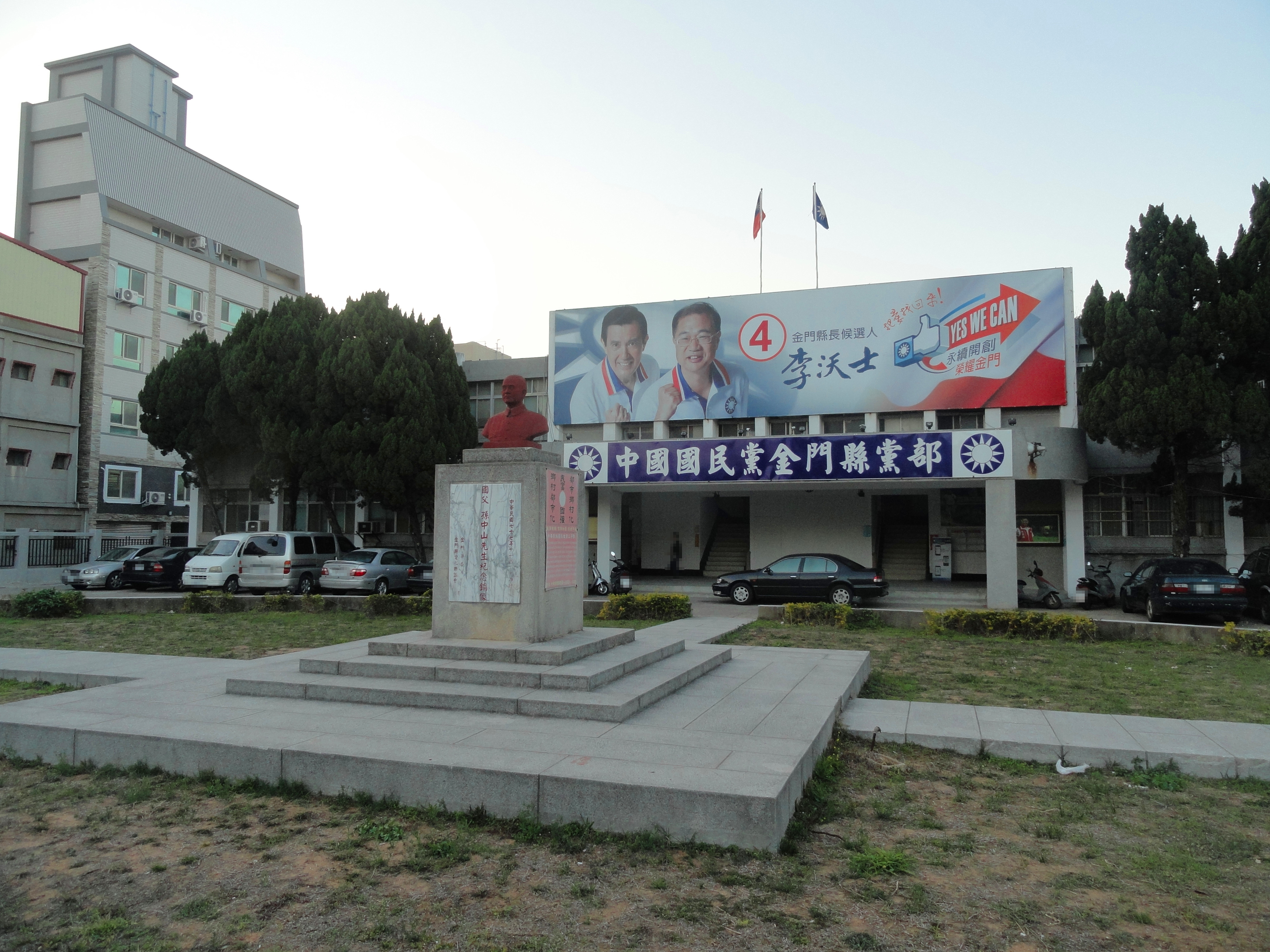
KMT Kinmen headquarters office in Jincheng Township, Kinmen County

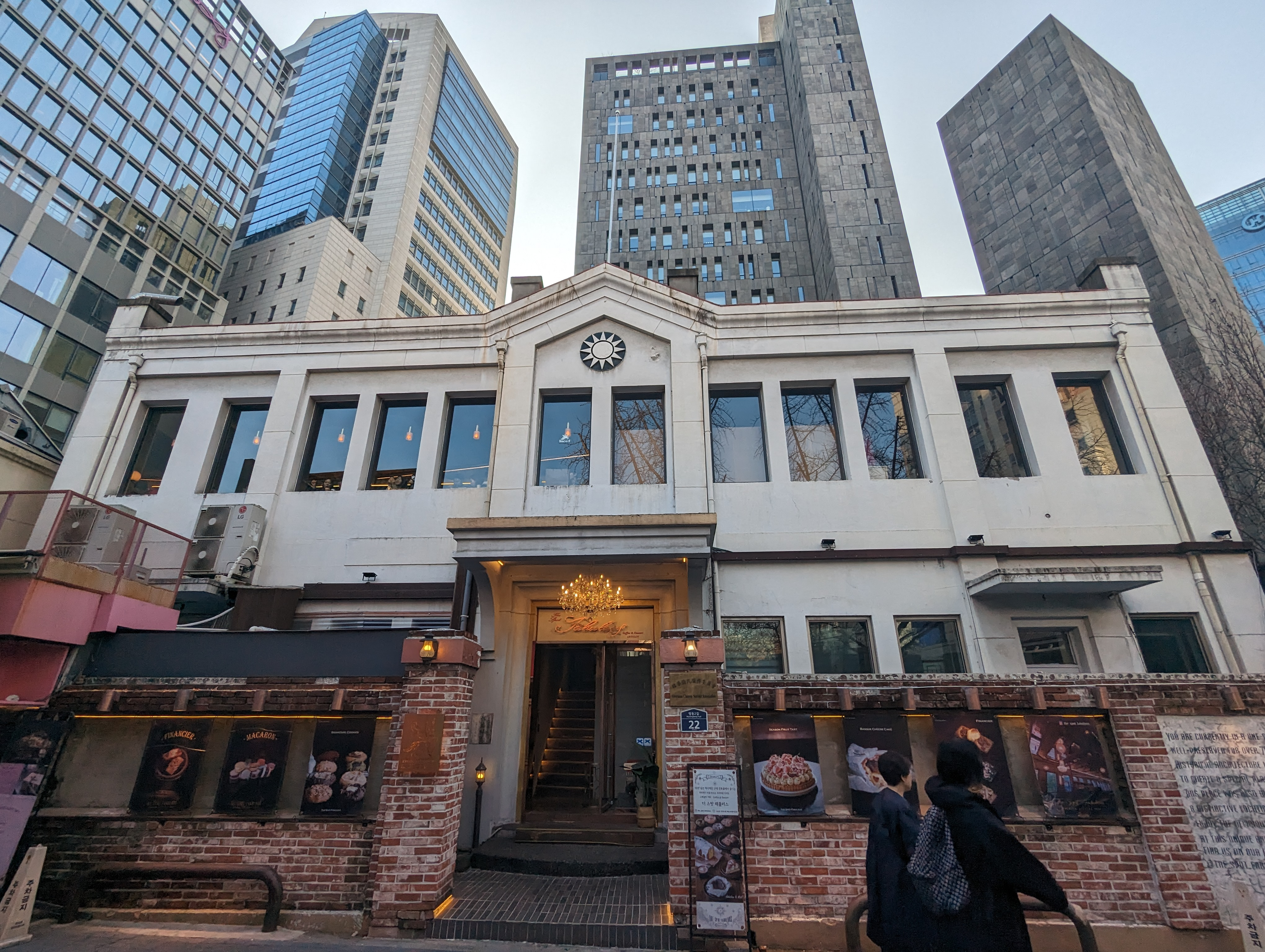
KMT Korea headquarters, located in front of the Embassy of China, at Myeong-dong, Seoul. Now a Café.

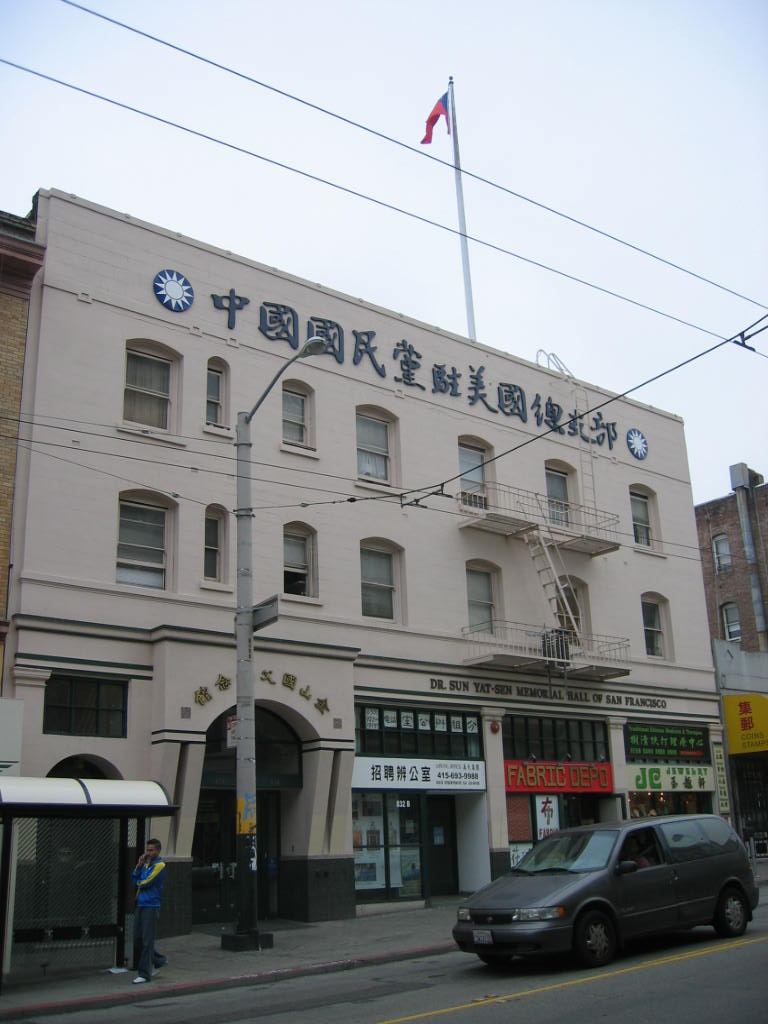
The KMT maintains offices in some of the Chinatowns of the world and its United States party headquarters are located in San Francisco Chinatown, on Stockton Street directly across the Chinese Six Companies

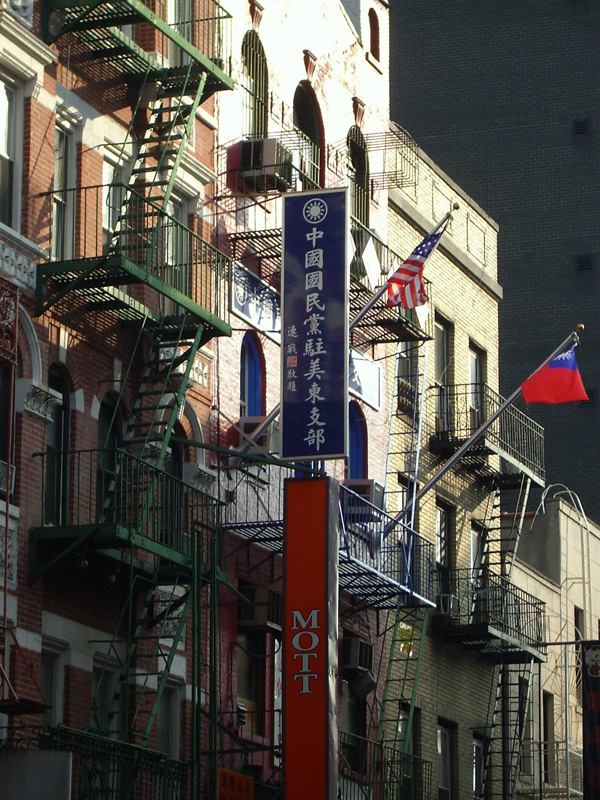
KMT Eastern U.S. headquarters, located in New York Chinatown, are the party's earliest offices in the U.S., established in 1909.

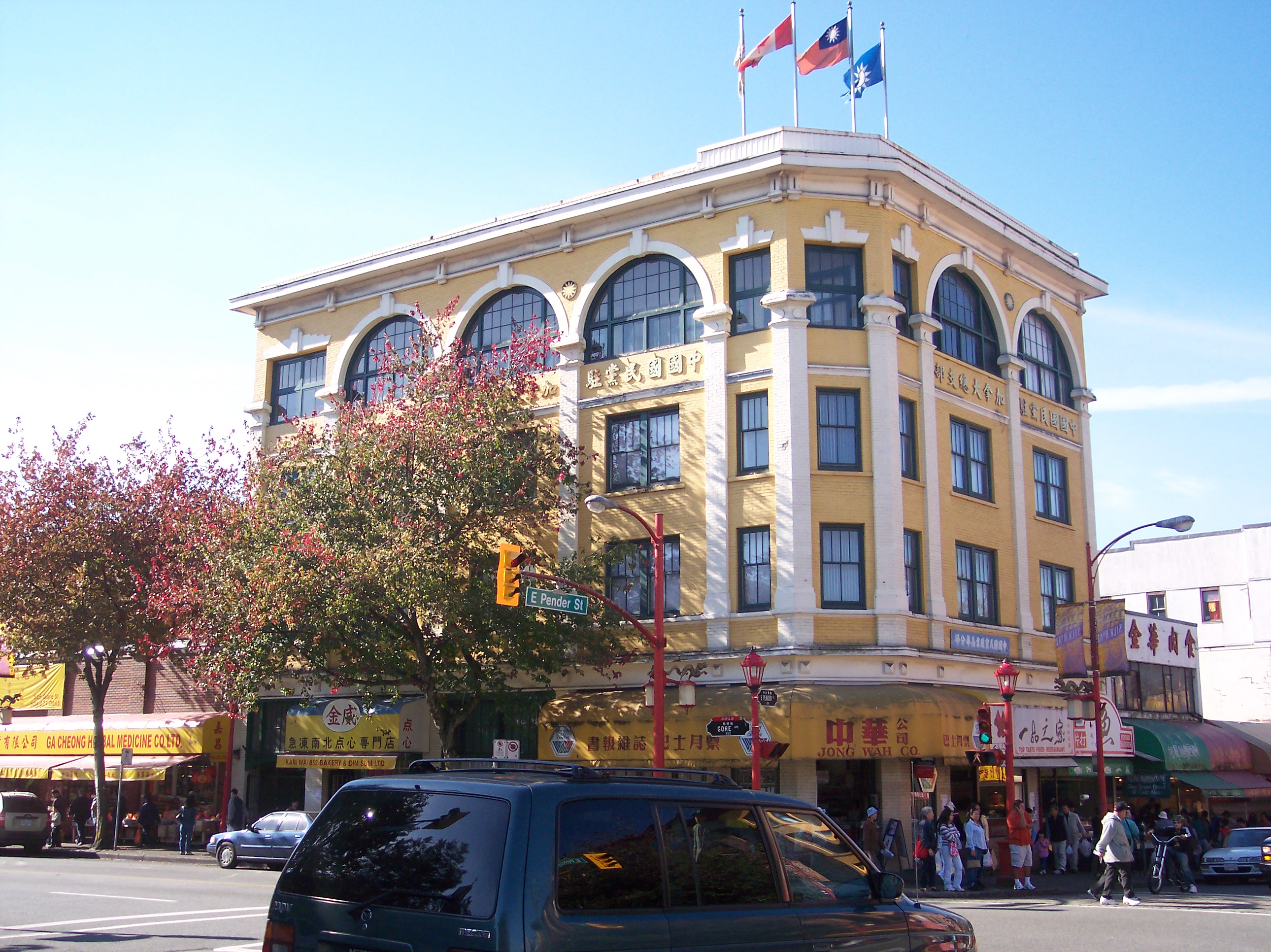
KMT Building in Vancouver's Chinatown, British Columbia, Canada

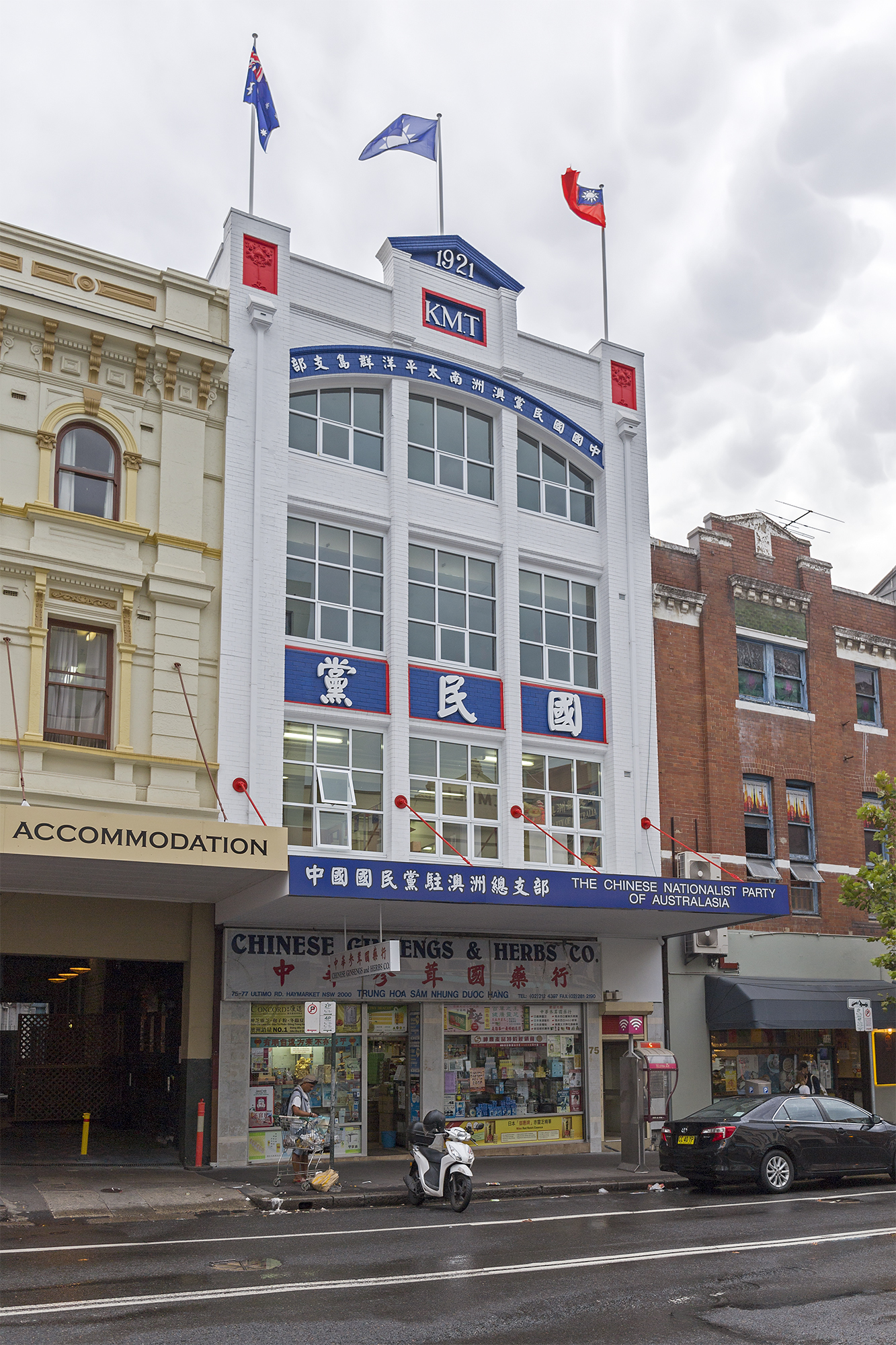
KMT office of Australasia in Sydney, Australia

=== Leadership ===
The Kuomintang's constitution designated Sun Yat-sen as party president. After his death, the Kuomintang opted to keep that language in its constitution to honor his memory forever, further designating him as "Permanent Prime Minister" and Chiang Kai-Shek as "Permanent President". The party has since been headed by a director-general (1927–1975) and a chairman (since 1975), positions which officially discharge the functions of the president.

==== Current Central Committee Leadership ====
Position	Name(s)
Chairperson	Cheng Li-wun
Vice Chairpersons	Lee Chien-lung, Ji Linlian, Xiao Xucen, Zhang Ronggong
Secretary-General	Lee Chien-lung
Deputy Secretaries-General	Chiang Chun-ting (full-time), Wang Yu-min (full-time), Lee Yen-hsiu, Hsieh Yi-fong, Alex Fai
Policy Committee Executive Director	Tseng Ming-chung
Organizational Development Committee Director	Hsu Yu-chen
Culture and Communications Committee Director	Ling Tao
Administration Committee Director	Chiu Da-chan
Party Disciplinary Committee Director	Lee Guei-min
Institute of Revolutionary Practice Director	Lin Yi-hua

==== Legislative Yuan leader (Caucus leader) ====
，政策委員會秘書長即黨團領袖

- 谷鳳翔 （– 18 August 1965）
- Kuo Cheng （18 August 1965 – 6 February 1967）
- 張寶樹 （1967–1968）
- 王任遠 (1968–1970)
- Chao Tzu-chi (1970–1988)
- Liang Su-yung (1988–1989)
- Yao Eng-chi (1993)
- Hong Yuh-chin (1 February 1999 – 1 February 2004)
- Tseng Yung-chuan (1 February 2004 – 1 December 2008)
- Lin Yi-shih (1 December 2008 – 1 February 2012)
- Lin Hung-chih (1 February 2012 – 31 July 2014)
- Alex Fai (31 July 2014 – 7 February 2015)
- Lai Shyh-bao (7 February 2015 – 7 July 2016)
- Liao Kuo-tung (7 July 2016 – 29 June 2017)
- Lin Te-fu (29 June 2017 – 14 June 2018)
- Johnny Chiang (14 June 2018–2019)
- Tseng Ming-chung (2019–2020)
- Lin Wei-chou (2020–2021)
- Alex Fai (2021–2022)
- Tseng Ming-chung (2022–2024)
- Fu Kun-chi (since 2024)

=== Party organization and structure ===
The KMT is being led by a Central Committee with a commitment to a principle of democratic centralism:

- National Congress
  - Party chairman
    - Vice-chairmen
  - Central Committee
    - Central Steering Committee for Women
  - Central Standing Committee
  - Secretary-General
    - Deputy Secretaries-General
  - Executive Director

==== Standing committees and departments ====
- Policy Committee
  - Policy Coordination Department
  - Policy Research Department
  - Mainland Affairs Department
- Institute of Revolutionary Practice, formerly National Development Institute
  - Kuomintang Youth League
  - Research Division
  - Education and Counselling Division
- Party Disciplinary Committee
  - Evaluation and Control Office
  - Audit Office
- Culture and Communications Committee
  - Cultural Department
  - Communications Department
  - KMT Party History Institute
- Administration Committee
  - Personnel Office
  - General Office
  - Finance Office
  - Accounting Office
  - Information Center
- Organizational Development Committee
  - Organization and Operations Department
  - Elections Mobilization Department
  - Community Volunteers Department
  - Overseas Department
  - Youth Department
  - Women's Department

=== Party charter ===
The Kuomintang Party Charter was adopted on 28 January 1924. The current charter has 51 articles and includes contents of General Principles, Party Membership, Organization, The National President, The Director-General, The National Congress, The Central Committee, District and Sub-District Party Headquarters, Cadres and Tenure, Discipline, Awards and Punishment, Funding, and Supplementary Provisions. The most recent version was made at the Twentieth National Congress on 28 July 2019.

=== Factions ===
==== Historical Factions ====
- Western Hills Group
- Reorganization Group
- Left-wing of Kuomintang (eventually becoming the Revolutionary Committee of the Chinese Kuomintang)
- Guominjun (semi-independent)
- Political Science Clique
- Whampoa Clique
- Blue Shirt Society (split from the Whampoa Clique)
- CC Clique
- New Cadre Clique (split from CC Clique)
- Tsotanhui Clique (formed by merger of Whampoa Clique, Blue Shirt Society and Three Principles of the People Youth Corps)
- Mainstream Clique
- Non-Mainstream Clique

==== Contemporary Faction ====
- Brainstorming Breakfast Clique
- New Kuomintang Alliance
- Lien Clique
- Mǎ Clique
- Chu Clique
- Huang Fu-hsing Clique
- Regional Clique

== Ideology in mainland China ==
=== Chinese nationalism ===
The KMT was a nationalist revolutionary party that had been supported by the Soviet Union. It was organized on the Leninist principle of democratic centralism.

The KMT had several influences upon its ideology by revolutionary thinking. The KMT and Chiang Kai-shek used the words 'feudal' and 'counterrevolutionary' as synonyms for evil and backwardness, and they proudly proclaimed themselves to be revolutionaries. Chiang called the warlords feudalists, and he also called for feudalism and counterrevolutionaries to be stamped out by the KMT. Chiang showed extreme rage when he was called a warlord, because of the word's negative and feudal connotations. Ma Bufang was forced to defend himself against the accusations, and stated to the news media that his army was a part of "National army, people's power".

Chiang Kai-shek, the head of the KMT, warned the Soviet Union and other foreign countries about interfering in Chinese affairs. He was personally angry at the way China was treated by foreigners, mainly by the Soviet Union, Britain, and the United States. He and his New Life Movement called for the crushing of Soviet, Western, American and other foreign influences in China. Chen Lifu, a CC Clique member in the KMT, said "Communism originated from Soviet imperialism, which has encroached on our country." It was also noted that "the white bear of the North Pole is known for its viciousness and cruelty".

KMT leaders across China adopted nationalist rhetoric. The Chinese Muslim general Ma Bufang of Qinghai presented himself as a Chinese nationalist to the people of China who was fighting against Western imperialism to deflect criticism by opponents that his government was feudal and oppressed minorities like Tibetans and Buddhist Mongols. He used his Chinese nationalist credentials to his advantage to keep himself in power.

=== Fascist influences ===
The Blue Shirts Society, a ultranationalist paramilitary organization within the KMT that modeled itself after Mussolini's blackshirts, was anti-foreign and anti-communist, and it stated that its agenda was to expel foreign (Japanese and Western) imperialists from China, crush Communism, and eliminate feudalism. In addition to being anticommunist, some KMT members, like Chiang Kai-shek's right-hand man Dai Li were anti-American, and wanted to expel American influence. Close Sino-German ties also promoted cooperation between Nazi Germany and Nationalist government. The Kuomintang sought to build a one-party ideological state in China, called Dang Guo, to solidify its rule and ideological supremacy.

The New Life Movement was a government-led civic movement in 1930s China initiated by Chiang Kai-shek to promote cultural reform and Neo-Confucian social morality and to ultimately unite China under a centralised ideology following the emergence of ideological challenges to the status quo. The Movement attempted to counter threats of Western and Japanese imperialism through a resurrection of traditional Chinese morality, which it held to be superior to modern Western values. As such the Movement was based upon Confucianism, mixed with Christianity, nationalism and authoritarianism that have some similarities to fascism. It rejected individualism and liberalism, while also opposing socialism and communism. Some historians regard this movement as imitating Nazism and being a neo-nationalistic movement used to elevate Chiang's control of everyday lives. Frederic Wakeman suggested that the New Life Movement was "Confucian fascism".

According to Stanley G. Payne, Chiang's KMT was "normally classified as a multi-class populist or 'nation-building' party but not a fitting candidate for fascism (except by old-line Communists)." He also stated that, "Lloyd Eastman has called the Blue Shirts, whose members admired European fascism and were influenced by it, a Chinese fascist organization. This is probably an exaggeration. The Blue Shirts certainly exhibited some of the characteristics of fascism, as did many nationalist organizations around the world, but it is not clear that the group possessed the full qualities of an intrinsic fascist movement [...] The Blue Shirts probably had some affinity with and for fascism, a common feature of nationalisms in crisis during the 1930s, but it is doubtful that they represented any clear-cut Asian variant of fascism." The Sino-German relationship also rapidly deteriorated as Germany failed to pursue a détente between China and Japan, which led to the outbreak of the Second Sino-Japanese War. China later declared war on fascist countries, including Germany, Italy, and Japan, as part of the Declarations of war during World War II and Chiang, the head of the KMT, became the most powerful "anti-fascist" leader in Asia.

=== Ideology of the New Guangxi Clique ===
The KMT branch in Guangxi province, led by the New Guangxi Clique of Bai Chongxi and Li Zongren, implemented anti-imperialist, anti-religious, and anti-foreign policies. During the Northern Expedition, in 1926 in Guangxi, Muslim General Bai Chongxi led his troops in destroying most of the Buddhist temples and smashing idols, turning the temples into schools and KMT headquarters. Bai led an anti-foreign wave in Guangxi, attacking American, European, and other foreigners and missionaries, and generally making the province unsafe for non-natives. Westerners fled from the province, and some Chinese Christians were also attacked as imperialist agents.

The leaders clashed with Chiang Kai-shek, which led to the Central Plains War where Chiang defeated the clique.

=== Socialism and anti-capitalist agitation ===
The KMT had a left wing and a right wing, the left being more radical in its pro-Soviet policies, but both wings equally persecuted merchants, accusing them of being counterrevolutionaries and reactionaries. The right wing under Chiang Kai-shek prevailed, and continued radical policies against private merchants and industrialists, even as they denounced communism.

One of the Three Principles of the People of the KMT, Mínshēng, was defined as socialism by Sun Yat-sen. He defined this principle of saying in his last days "it's socialism and it's communism". The concept may be understood as social welfare as well. Sun understood it as an industrial economy and equality of land holdings for the Chinese peasant farmers. Here he was influenced by the American thinker Henry George (see Georgism), the land value tax in Taiwan is a legacy thereof. He divided livelihood into four areas: food, clothing, housing, and transportation; and planned out how an ideal (Chinese) government can take care of these for its people.

The KMT was referred to having a socialist ideology. "Equalization of land rights" was a clause included by Sun in the original Tongmenghui. The KMT's revolutionary ideology in the 1920s incorporated unique Chinese Socialism as part of its ideology.

The Soviet Union trained KMT revolutionaries in the Moscow Sun Yat-sen University. In the West and in the Soviet Union, Chiang was known as the "Red General". Movie theaters in the Soviet Union showed newsreels and clips of Chiang, at Moscow Sun Yat-sen University Portraits of Chiang were hung on the walls, and in the Soviet May Day Parades that year, Chiang's portrait was to be carried along with the portraits of Karl Marx, Lenin, Stalin, and other socialist leaders.

The KMT attempted to levy taxes upon merchants in Canton, and the merchants resisted by raising an army, the Merchant's volunteer corps. Sun initiated this anti-merchant policy, and Chiang Kai-shek enforced it, Chiang led his army of Whampoa Military Academy graduates to defeat the merchant's army. Chiang was assisted by Soviet advisors, who supplied him with weapons, while the merchants were supplied with weapons from the Western countries.

The KMT was accused of leading a "Red Revolution" in Canton. The merchants were conservative and reactionary, and their Volunteer Corp leader Chen Lianbao was a prominent comprador trader.

The merchants were supported by the Western powers, who led an international flotilla to support them against the KMT. The KMT seized many of Western-supplied weapons from the merchants, using them to equip their troops. A KMT General executed several merchants, and the KMT formed a Soviet-inspired Revolutionary Committee. The British Communist Party sent a letter to Sun, congratulating him on his military successes.

In 1948, the KMT again attacked the merchants of Shanghai. Chiang Kai-shek sent his son Chiang Ching-kuo to restore economic order. Ching-kuo copied Soviet methods, which he learned during his stay there, to start a social revolution by attacking middle-class merchants. He also enforced low prices on all goods to raise support from the proletariat.

As riots broke out and savings were ruined, bankrupting shop owners, Ching-kuo began to attack the wealthy, seizing assets and placing them under arrest. The son of the gangster Du Yuesheng was arrested by him. Ching-kuo ordered KMT agents to raid the Yangtze Development Corporation's warehouses, which was privately owned by H.H. Kung and his family. H.H. Kung's wife was Soong Ai-ling, the sister of Soong Mei-ling who was Ching-kuo's stepmother. H.H. Kung's son David was arrested, the Kung's responded by blackmailing the Chiang's, threatening to release information about them, eventually he was freed after negotiations, and Ching-kuo resigned, ending the terror on the Shanghainese merchants.

The KMT also promotes government-owned corporations. KMT founder Sun Yat-sen, was heavily influenced by the economic ideas of Henry George, who believed that the rents extracted from natural monopolies or the usage of land belonged to the public. Sun argued for Georgism and emphasized the importance of a mixed economy, which he termed "The Principle of Minsheng" in his Three Principles of the People.

"The railroads, public utilities, canals, and forests should be nationalized, and all income from the land and mines should be in the hands of the State. With this money in hand, the State can therefore finance the social welfare programs."

The KMT Muslim Governor of Ningxia, Ma Hongkui, promoted state-owned monopolies. His government had a company, Fu Ning Company, which had a monopoly over commerce and industry in Ningxia.

Corporations such as CSBC Corporation, Taiwan, CPC Corporation and Aerospace Industrial Development Corporation are owned by the state in the Republic of China.

Marxists also existed in the KMT. They viewed revolution in different terms than the CCP, claiming that China already went past its feudal stage and was in a stagnation period rather than in another mode of production. These Marxists in the KMT opposed the CCP ideology. The Left Kuomintang who disagreed with Chiang Kai-shek formed the Revolutionary Committee of the Chinese Kuomintang when the KMT was on the edge of defeat in the civil war and later joined the government of the CCP.

=== Confucianism and religion in its ideology ===
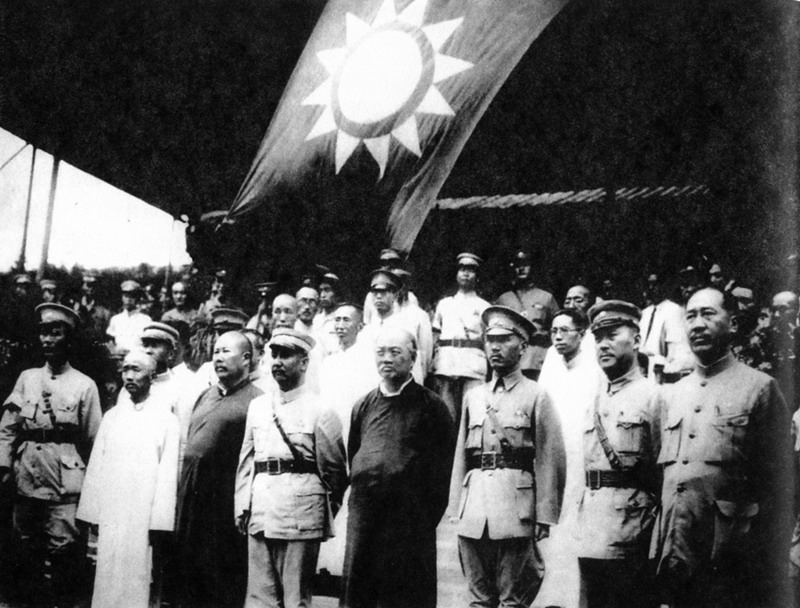
From left to right, KMT members pay tribute to the Sun Yat-sen Mausoleum in Beijing in 1928 after the success of the Northern Expedition: Generals Cheng Jin, Zhang Zuobao, Chen Diaoyuan, Chiang Kai-shek, Woo Tsin-hang, Yan Xishan, General Ma Fuxiang, Ma Sida and General Bai Chongxi

The KMT used traditional Chinese religious ceremonies. According to the KMT, the souls of party martyrs were sent to heaven. Chiang Kai-shek believed that these martyrs still witnessed events on Earth.

The KMT backed the New Life Movement, which promoted Confucianism, and it was also against westernization. KMT leaders also opposed the May Fourth Movement. Chiang Kai-shek, as a nationalist, and Confucianist, was against the iconoclasm of the May Fourth Movement. He viewed some western ideas as foreign, as a Chinese nationalist, and that the introduction of western ideas and literature that the May Fourth Movement wanted was not welcome. He and Sun Yat-sen criticized these May Fourth intellectuals for corrupting morals of youth.

The KMT also incorporated Confucianism in its jurisprudence. It pardoned Shi Jianqiao for murdering Sun Chuanfang, because she did it in revenge since Sun executed her father Shi Congbin, which was an example of filial piety to one's parents in Confucianism. The KMT encouraged filial revenge killings and extended pardons to those who performed them.

In response to the Cultural Revolution, Chiang Kai-shek promoted a Chinese Cultural Renaissance movement which followed in the steps of the New Life Movement, promoting Confucian values.

==== Education ====
The KMT purged China's education system of Western ideas, introducing Confucianism into the curriculum. Education came under the total control of the state, which meant, in effect, the KMT, via the Ministry of Education. Military and political classes on KMT's Three Principles of the People were added. Textbooks, exams, degrees and educational instructors were all controlled by the state, as were all universities.

=== Soviet-style military ===
Chiang Ching-kuo, appointed as KMT director of Secret Police in 1950, was educated in the Soviet Union, and initiated Soviet style military organization in the Republic of China Armed Forces, reorganizing and Sovietizing the political officer corps, surveillance, and KMT activities were propagated throughout the whole of the armed forces. Opposed to this was Sun Li-jen, who was educated at the American Virginia Military Institute. Chiang Ching-kuo then arrested Sun Li-jen, charging him of conspiring with the American CIA of plotting to overthrow Chiang Kai-shek and the KMT, Sun was placed under house arrest in 1955.

=== Anti-communism ===
Before the founding of the People's Republic of China (PRC), the KMT—then under the leadership of Chiang Kai-shek—established one-party control over the Republic of China (ROC) after the end of the First United Front: a period of alliance between the KMT and Communist Party. Between this point and the start of the Second Sino-Japanese War, the KMT under Chiang promoted a policy of strong ideological and military opposition to the Chinese Communist Party, the Chinese Soviet Republic (a predecessor polity to the PRC) and its COMINTERN supporters (i.e. the Soviet Union). On 12 April 1927, Chiang Kai-shek violently purged the communists in what was known as the Shanghai massacre, which instigated the Chinese Civil War. The Chinese Nationalist government then led five military campaigns in an attempt to wipe out Chinese Soviet Republic. Initially, the Kuomintang was successful, eventually forcing the CCP to retreat into the Chinese interior during the Long March, though this was interrupted by the Second Sino-Japanese War, which forced both the Nationalists and the Communists into another alliance: the Second United Front. After the war, the two parties were thrown back into a civil war. The Kuomintang were defeated in the mainland and escaped in exile to Taiwan while the rest of mainland China became Communist in 1949.

=== Policy on ethnic minorities ===
Former KMT leader Chiang Kai-shek considered all the minority peoples of China as descendants of the Yellow Emperor, the semi-mythical initiator of the Chinese civilization. Chiang considered all ethnic minorities in China to belong to the Zhonghua minzu (Chinese nation) and he introduced this into KMT ideology, which was propagated into the educational system of the Republic of China, and the Constitution of the ROC considered Chiang's ideology to be true. In Taiwan, the president performs a ritual honoring the Yellow Emperor, while facing west, in the direction of mainland China.

The KMT retained the Mongolian and Tibetan Affairs Commission for dealing with Mongolian and Tibetan affairs. A Muslim, Ma Fuxiang, was appointed as its chairman.

The KMT was known for sponsoring Muslim students to study abroad at Muslim universities like Al-Azhar University and it established schools especially for Muslims, Muslim KMT warlords like Ma Fuxiang promoted education for Muslims. KMT Muslim Warlord Ma Bufang built a girls' school for Muslim girls in Linxia City which taught modern secular education.

Tibetans and Mongols refused to allow other ethnic groups like Kazakhs to participate in the Kokonur ceremony in Qinghai, but KMT Muslim General Ma Bufang allowed them to participate.

Chinese Muslims were among the most hardline KMT members. Ma Chengxiang was a Muslim KMT member, and he refused to surrender to the Communists.

The KMT incited anti-Yan Xishan and Feng Yuxiang sentiments among Hui people and Mongols, encouraging for them to topple their rule during the Central Plains War.

Masud Sabri, a Uyghur was appointed as Governor of Xinjiang by the KMT, as was the Tatar Burhan Shahidi and the Uyghur Yulbars Khan.

The Muslim General Ma Bufang also put KMT symbols on his mansion, the Ma Bufang Mansion along with a portrait of party founder Sun Yat-sen arranged with the KMT flag and the Republic of China flag.

General Ma Bufang and other high ranking Muslim Generals attended the Kokonuur Lake Ceremony where the God of the Lake was worshipped, and during the ritual, the Chinese national anthem was sung, all participants bowed to a Portrait of KMT founder Sun Yat-sen, and the God of the Lake was also bowed to, and offerings were given to him by the participants, which included the Muslims. This cult of personality around the KMT leader and the KMT was standard in all meetings. Sun Yat-sen's portrait was bowed to three times by KMT party members. Sun's portrait was arranged with two flags crossed under, the KMT flag and the flag of the Republic of China.

The KMT also hosted conferences of important Muslims like Bai Chongxi, Ma Fuxiang, and Ma Liang. Ma Bufang stressed "racial harmony" as a goal when he was Governor of Qinghai.

In 1939, Isa Yusuf Alptekin and Ma Fuliang were sent on a mission by the KMT to the Middle Eastern countries such as Egypt, Turkey and Syria to gain support for the Chinese War against Japan, they also visited Afghanistan in 1940 and contacted Muhammad Amin Bughra, they asked him to come to Chongqing, the capital of the Nationalist Government. Bughra was arrested by the British government in 1942 for spying, and the KMT arranged for Bughra's release. He and Isa Yusuf worked as editors of KMT Muslim publications. Ma Tianying (馬天英) (1900–1982) led the 1939 mission which had 5 other people including Isa and Fuliang.

=== Anti-separatism ===
The claimed sovereign borders of the Republic of China, as inherited from the Great Qing in 1912 and claimed by the Kuomintang.

The KMT, being anti-separatist, claims sovereignty the territories of the modern People's Republic and Republic of China.

KMT Muslim General Ma Bufang waged war on the invading Tibetans during the Sino-Tibetan War with his Muslim army, and he repeatedly crushed Tibetan revolts during bloody battles in Qinghai provinces. Ma Bufang was fully supported by President Chiang Kai-shek, who ordered him to prepare his Muslim army to invade Tibet several times and threatened aerial bombardment on the Tibetans. With support from the KMT, Ma Bufang repeatedly attacked the Tibetan area of Golog seven times during the KMT Pacification of Qinghai, eliminating thousands of Tibetans.

General Ma Fuxiang, the chairman of the Mongolian and Tibetan Affairs Commission stated that Mongolia and Tibet were an integral part of the Republic of China, arguing:

Our Party [the Guomindang] takes the development of the weak and small and resistance to the strong and violent as our sole and most urgent task. This is even more true for those groups which are not of our kind [Ch. fei wo zulei zhe]. Now the people of Mongolia and Tibet are closely related to us, and we have great affection for one another: our common existence and common honor already have a history of over a thousand years. [...] Mongolia and Tibet's life and death are China's life and death. China absolutely cannot cause Mongolia and Tibet to break away from China's territory, and Mongolia and Tibet cannot reject China to become independent. At this time, there is not a single nation on earth except China that will sincerely develop Mongolia and Tibet.

Ma Bufang also crushed Mongol separatist movements, abducting the Genghis Khan Shrine and attacking Tibetan Buddhist Temples like Labrang, and keeping a tight control over them through the Kokonur God ceremony.

== Ideology in Taiwan ==
=== Anti-communism ===
On 28 February 1947, the Kuomintang cracked down on an anti-government uprising in Taiwan known as the February 28 incident and the government began the White Terror in Taiwan in order to purge communist spies and prevent Chinese communist subversion. While in Taiwan, the Republic of China government under the Kuomintang remained anti-communist and attempted to recover the mainland from the Communist forces. During the Cold War, Taiwan was referred to as Free China while the China on the mainland was known as Red China or Communist China in the West, to mark the ideological difference between the capitalist 'Free World' and the communist nations. The ROC government under the Kuomintang also actively supported anti-communist efforts in Southeast Asia and around the world. This effort did not cease until the death of Chiang Kai-shek in 1975. The Kuomintang continued to be anti-communist during the period of Chiang Ching-kuo. Contacts between Kuomintang and Chinese Communist Party have started since 1990s to re-establish Cross-Strait relations. Although relations has improved with the PRC since the 1992 Consensus, with both sides having a common opposition to Taiwanese nationalism, it continues to be opposed to communism, as anti-communism is written under Article 2 of Kuomintang's party charter.

=== Three Principles of the People ===
Sun Yat-sen was not just the founder of the Republic of China, but also the founder of the Kuomintang. Sun Yat-sen's political ideology was based on building a free and democratic China founded on Three Principles of the People, namely Chinese nationalism, democracy, and people's economic livelihood. Although the Kuomintang lost control over mainland China in 1949, the Republic of China under Kuomintang rule was able to achieve the political ideal of a democratic Republic of China on the island of Taiwan based on the Three Principles of the People after its retreat to Taiwan. The Three Principles of the People is not just written in the ROC Constitution, but also in Article 1, 5, 7, 9, 37, 42, 43 of Kuomintang's party charter.

=== Chinese democracy ===
The Kuomintang advocates a free and democratic China under the Republic of China founded on Three Principles of the People. In fact, during the 1980s, Chiang Ching-kuo advocated Grand Alliance for China's Reunification under the Three Principles of the People. Since then, a democracy promotion banner for Grand Alliance for China's Reunification under the Three Principles of the People continues to exist in Kinmen today as a display to mainland China that the Republic of China's unification principle should be based on Chinese democracy. Today, the Kuomintang continues to view the Republic of China as the free, democratic and legitimate China.

=== Cross-Strait relations ===
A Chinese nationalist party, the Kuomintang strongly adheres to the defense of the Republic of China and upholding the Constitution of the Republic of China. It is strongly opposed to formal Taiwanese independence and holds that the ROC is the sole legitimate representative of all of China. It favors a closer relationship with the PRC and the CCP, though it also opposes Chinese unification under the "One country, two systems" framework of the PRC. It opposes any non-peaceful means to resolve the cross-strait disputes. The party also accepts the 1992 Consensus, which defines both sides of the Taiwan Strait as "one China" but maintains its ambiguity to different interpretations. Although the KMT's long-term goal is to unify China under the ROC, the party advocates maintaining the status quo of Taiwan.

=== Chinese conservatism ===
In modern Taiwanese politics, the Kuomintang is seen as a centre-right to right-wing political party. The Kuomintang believes in the values associated with conservatism. The Kuomintang has a strong tradition of defending the established institutions of the Republic of China, such as defending Constitution of the Republic of China, defending the five branches of government (modeled on Sun Yat-sen's political philosophy of Three Principles of the People), espousing the One-China policy as a vital component for the Republic of China (ROC)'s international security and economic development, as opposed to Taiwanization. The Kuomintang claims to have a strong tradition of fighting to defend, preserve and revive traditional Chinese culture and religious freedom as well as advocating for Confucian values, economic liberalism and anti-communism. The KMT still sees the Republic of China in Taiwan as presenting the true cultural China which has preserved Chinese culture, as compared to the People's Republic of China which had experienced Chinese cultural destruction during the Cultural Revolution.

Some Kuomintang conservatives see traditional social or family values as being threatened by liberal values and oppose same-sex marriage, but some KMT members of the Legislative Yuan, including Chiang Wan-an, Ko Chih-en, Chen Yi-min and Hsu Shu-hua, voted in favor of the No. 748 Same-Sex Marriage Case, in 2019. Many KMT politicians are also typically against the abolition of capital punishment, arguing the need to maintain deterrence against harsh crimes.

Conservative KMT policies may also be characterized by a focus on maintaining the traditions and doctrine of Confucian thought, namely reinforcing the morals of paternalism and patriarchy in Taiwan's society, but the KMT has a more liberal stance on women's rights and gender equality compared to mainstream conservatives in other advanced countries in East Asia, such as Japan's Liberal Democratic Party. In terms of education policy, KMT policies advocate increasing more Classical Chinese content in Chinese education and Chinese history content in order to reinforce Chinese cultural identity, as opposed to de-sinicization attempts by advocates of Taiwan independence who typically decrease Classical Chinese and Chinese history content in schools in order to achieve Taiwanization. The party also support transnational marriages between mainland Chinese and Taiwanese in an attempt to preserve Chinese culture in Taiwan, although not without controversies over assimilation and espionage.

== Parties affiliated with the Kuomintang ==
=== Malaysian Chinese Association ===
Malaysian Chinese Association

The Malaysian Chinese Association (MCA) was initially pro-ROC and mainly consisted of KMT members who joined as an alternative and were also in opposition to the Malayan Communist Party, supporting the KMT in China by funding them with the intention of reclaiming mainland China from the communists.

=== Tibet Improvement Party ===
The Tibet Improvement Party was founded by Pandatsang Rapga, a pro-ROC and pro-KMT Khampa revolutionary, who worked against the 14th Dalai Lama's Tibetan Government in Lhasa. Rapga borrowed Sun Yat-sen's Three Principles of the People doctrine and translated his political theories into the Tibetan language, hailing it as the best hope for Asian peoples against imperialism. Rapga stated that "the Sanmin Zhuyi was intended for all peoples under the domination of foreigners, for all those who had been deprived of the rights of man. But it was conceived especially for the Asians. It is for this reason that I translated it. At that time, a lot of new ideas were spreading in Tibet," during an interview in 1975 by Heather Stoddard. He wanted to destroy the feudal government in Lhasa, in addition to modernizing and secularizing Tibetan society. The ultimate goal of the party was the overthrow of the Dalai Lama's regime, and the creation of a Tibetan Republic which would be an autonomous Republic within the ROC. Chiang Kai-shek and the KMT funded the party and their efforts to build an army to battle the Dalai Lama's government. The KMT was extensively involved in the Kham region, recruiting the Khampa people to both oppose the Dalai Lama's Tibetan government, fight the Communist Red Army, and crush the influence of local Chinese warlords who did not obey the central government.

=== Vietnamese Nationalist Party ===
Vietnamese Kuomintang

People's Action Party of Vietnam

The KMT assisted the Việt Nam Quốc Dân Đảng party which translates literally into Chinese (越南國民黨; Yuènán Guómíndǎng) as the Vietnamese Nationalist Party. When it was established, it was based on the Chinese KMT and was pro-Chinese. The Chinese KMT helped the party, known as the VNQDD, set up headquarters in Canton and Yunnan, to aid their anti-imperialist struggle against the French occupiers of Indochina and against the Vietnamese Communist Party. It was the first revolutionary nationalist party to be established in Vietnam, before the communist party. The KMT assisted VNQDD with funds and military training.

The VNQDD was founded with KMT aid in 1925, in opposition to Ho Chi Minh's Viet Nam Revolutionary Youth League. When the VNQDD fled to China after the failed uprising against the French, they settled in Yunnan and Canton, in two different branches. The VNQDD existed as a party in exile in China for 15 years, receiving help, militarily and financially, and organizationally from the Chinese KMT. The two VNQDD parties merged into a single organization, the Canton branch removed the word "revolutionary" from the party name. Lu Han, a KMT official in Nanjing, who was originally from Yunnan, was contacted by the VNQDD, and the KMT Central Executive Committee and Military made direct contact with VNQDD for the first time, the party was reestablished in Nanjing with KMT help.

The Chinese KMT used the VNQDD for its own interests in south China and Indo China. General Zhang Fakui (Chang Fa-kuei), who based himself in Guangxi, established the Việt Nam Cách mệnh Đồng minh Hội meaning "Viet Nam Revolutionary League" in 1942, which was assisted by the VNQDD to serve the KMT's aims. The Chinese Yunnan provincial army, under the KMT, occupied northern Vietnam after the Japanese surrender in 1945, the VNQDD tagging alone, opposing Ho Chi Minh's communist party. The Viet Nam Revolutionary League was a union of various Vietnamese nationalist groups, run by the pro Chinese VNQDD. Its stated goal was for unity with China under the Three Principles of the People, created by KMT founder Sun and opposition to Japanese and French Imperialists. The Revolutionary League was controlled by Nguyễn Hải Thần. General Zhang shrewdly blocked the Communists of Vietnam, and Ho Chi Minh from entering the league, as his main goal was Chinese influence in Indo China. The KMT utilized these Vietnamese nationalists during World War II against Japanese forces.

A KMT left-winger, General Chang Fa-kuei, worked with Nguyễn Hải Thần, a VNQDD member, against French Imperialists and Communists in Indo China. General Chang Fa-kuei planned to lead a Chinese army invasion of Tonkin in Indochina to free Vietnam from French control, and to get Chiang Kai-shek's support. The VNQDD opposed the government of Ngo Dinh Diem during the Vietnam War.

The party dissolved after the Fall of Saigon in 1977 and was later re-founded in 1991 as the People's Action Party of Vietnam (Đảng Nhân dân Hành động Việt Nam).

=== Ryukyu Nationalist Party ===
The Ryukyu Nationalist Party (琉球国民党) was established on 30 November 1958. Tsugumasa Kiyuna headed its predecessor party, the Ryukyuan separatist Ryukyu Revolutionary Party (琉球革命党) which was backed by the Kuomintang in Taiwan.

=== Hong Kong Pro-ROC camp ===
The pro-ROC camp is a political alignment in Hong Kong. It pledges allegiance to the Republic of China. One of these members, the 123 Democratic Alliance, dissolved in 2000 due to the lack of financial support from the Taiwanese government after the 2000 presidential election.

== Sponsored organizations ==
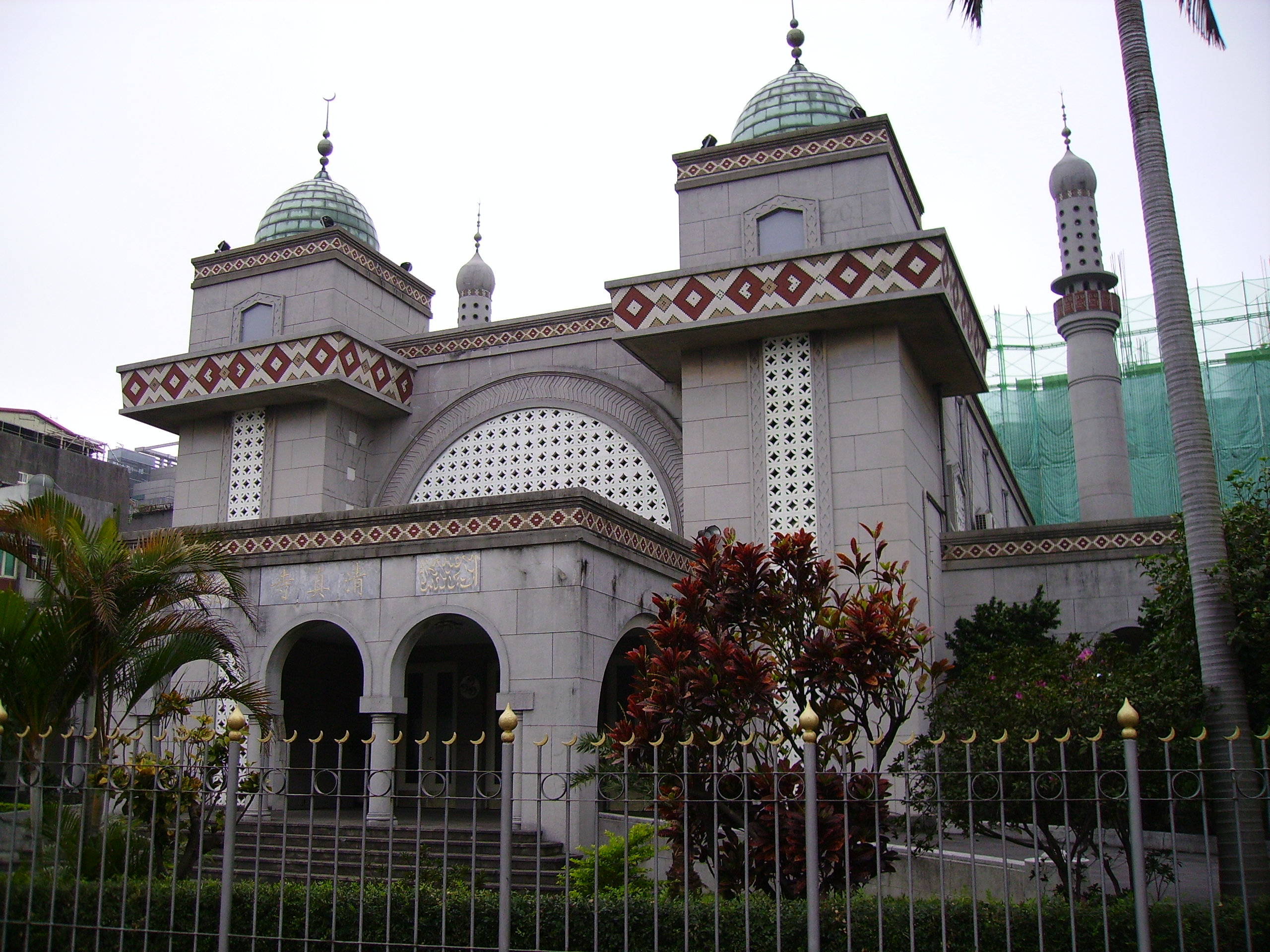
Taipei Grand Mosque

Ma Fuxiang founded Islamic organizations sponsored by the KMT, including the China Islamic Association (中國回教公會).

KMT Muslim General Bai Chongxi was Chairman of the Chinese Islamic National Salvation Federation. The Muslim Chengda school and Yuehua publication were supported by the Nationalist Government, and they supported the KMT.

The Chinese Muslim Association was also sponsored by the KMT, and it evacuated from the mainland to Taiwan with the party. The Chinese Muslim Association owns the Taipei Grand Mosque which was built with funds from the KMT.

The Yihewani (Ikhwan al Muslimun a.k.a. Muslim brotherhood) was the predominant Muslim sect backed by the KMT. Other Muslim sects, like the Xidaotang were also supported by the KMT. The Chinese Muslim brotherhood became a Chinese nationalist organization and supported KMT rule. Brotherhood Imams like Hu Songshan ordered Muslims to pray for the Nationalist Government, salute KMT flags during prayer, and listen to nationalist sermons.

== Election results ==
=== Presidential elections ===
Election	Candidate	Running mate	Total votes	Share of votes	Outcome
1923	Sun Yat-sen (Note: Other KMT candidates running in this election are not listed.)	—N/a	33	6.9%	Defeated
1948	Chiang Kai-shek	Li Zongren	2,430	90.0%	Elected
1954	Chiang Kai-shek	Chen Cheng	1,507	96.9%	Elected
1960	Chiang Kai-shek	Chen Cheng	1,481	100%	Unopposed
1966	Chiang Kai-shek	Yen Chia-kan	1,481	100%	Unopposed
1972	Chiang Kai-shek	Yen Chia-kan	1,308	100%	Unopposed
1978	Chiang Ching-kuo	Hsieh Tung-min	1,184	100%	Unopposed
1984	Chiang Ching-kuo	Lee Teng-hui	1,012	100%	Unopposed
1990	Lee Teng-hui	Lee Yuan-tsu	641	100%	Unopposed
1996	Lee Teng-hui	Lien Chan	5,813,699	54.0%	Elected
2000	Lien Chan	Vincent Siew	2,925,513	23.1%	Defeated
2004	Lien Chan	James Soong ( PFP)	6,442,452	49.9%	Defeated
2008	Ma Ying-jeou	Vincent Siew	7,659,014	58.5%	Elected
2012	Ma Ying-jeou	Wu Den-yih	6,891,139	51.6%	Elected
2016	Eric Chu	Wang Ju-hsuan ( Ind.)	3,813,365	31.0%	Defeated
2020	Han Kuo-yu	Chang San-cheng ( Ind.)	5,522,119	38.6%	Defeated
2024	Hou Yu-ih	Jaw Shaw-kong	4,671,021	33.5%	Defeated

=== Legislative elections ===
Election	Total seats won	Total votes	Share of votes	Changes	Election leader	Status	President
1948	716 / 759				Chiang Kai-shek	Majority	Chiang Kai-shek
1969	8 / 11				Chiang Kai-shek	Majority	Chiang Kai-shek
1972	41 / 51				Chiang Kai-shek	Majority	Chiang Kai-shek
1975	42 / 52				Chiang Ching-kuo	Majority	Yen Chia-kan
1980	79 / 97				Chiang Ching-kuo	Majority	Chiang Ching-kuo
1983	83 / 98				Chiang Ching-kuo	Majority	Chiang Ching-kuo
1986	79 / 100				Chiang Ching-kuo	Majority	Chiang Ching-kuo
1989	94 / 130				Lee Teng-hui	Majority	Lee Teng-hui
1992	95 / 161	5,030,725	53.0%	▼7 seats	Lee Teng-hui	Majority	Lee Teng-hui
1995	85 / 164	4,349,089	46.1%	▼12 seats	Lee Teng-hui	Majority	Lee Teng-hui
1998	123 / 225	4,659,679	46.4%	▲7 seats (adjusted)	Lee Teng-hui	Majority	Lee Teng-hui
1998	123 / 225	4,659,679	46.4%	▲7 seats (adjusted)	Lee Teng-hui	Opposing majority	Chen Shui-bian
2001	68 / 225	2,949,371	31.3%	▼46 seats	Lien Chan	Opposing plurality	Chen Shui-bian
2004	79 / 225	3,190,081	34.9%	▲11 seats	Lien Chan	Opposing plurality	Chen Shui-bian
2008	81 / 113	5,291,512	53.5%	▲41 seats (adjusted)	Wu Po-hsiung	Opposing majority	Chen Shui-bian
2008	81 / 113	5,291,512	53.5%	▲41 seats (adjusted)	Wu Po-hsiung	Majority	Ma Ying-jeou
2012	64 / 113	5,863,379	44.5%	▼17 seats	Ma Ying-jeou	Majority	Ma Ying-jeou
2016	35 / 113	3,280,949	26.9%	▼29 seats	Eric Chu	Minority	Tsai Ing-wen
2020	38 / 113	4,723,504	33.3%	▲3 seats	Wu Den-yih	Minority	Tsai Ing-wen
2024	52 / 113	4,764,293	34.6%	▲14 seats	Eric Chu	Opposing plurality	Lai Ching-te

=== Local elections ===
Election	Magistrates and mayors	Councillors	Township/city mayors	Township/city council representatives	Village chiefs	Party leader
1994 provincial	2 / 3	91 / 175	—N/a	—N/a	—N/a	Lee Teng-hui
1997	8 / 23	522 / 886	236 / 319	—N/a	—N/a	Lee Teng-hui
1998 municipal	1 / 2	48 / 96	—N/a	—N/a	—N/a	Lee Teng-hui
2001	9 / 23	382 / 897	195 / 319	—N/a	—N/a	Lien Chan
2002 municipal	1 / 2	32 / 96	—N/a	—N/a	—N/a	Lien Chan
2005	14 / 23	408 / 901	173 / 319	—N/a	—N/a	Ma Ying-jeou
2006 municipal	1 / 2	41 / 96	—N/a	—N/a	—N/a	Ma Ying-jeou
2009	12 / 17	289 / 587	121 / 211	—N/a	—N/a	Ma Ying-jeou
2010 municipal	3 / 5	130 / 314	—N/a	—N/a	1,195 / 3,757	Ma Ying-jeou
2014 unified	6 / 22	386 / 906	80 / 204	538 / 2,137	1,794 / 7,836	Ma Ying-jeou
2018 unified	15 / 22	394 / 912	83 / 204	390 / 2,148	1,120 / 7,744	Wu Den-yih
2022 unified	14 / 22	367 / 910	76 / 204	294 / 2,139	953 / 7,748	Eric Chu

=== National Assembly elections ===
Election	Total seats won	Total votes	Share of votes	Changes	Party leader	Status	President
1912	132 / 274(Senate) 269 / 596(House)	?	?		Sung Chiao-jen	Plurality	Yuan Shikai
1947	2,901 / 3,045	?	?		Chiang Kai-shek	Majority	Chiang Kai-shek
1969	15 / 15	?	?		Chiang Kai-shek	Majority	Chiang Kai-shek
1972	43 / 53	?	?		Chiang Kai-shek	Majority	Chiang Kai-shek
1980	61 / 76	?	?		Chiang Ching-kuo	Majority	Chiang Ching-kuo
1986	68 / 84	?	?		Chiang Ching-kuo	Majority	Chiang Ching-kuo
1991	254 / 325	6,053,366	69.1%	▲186 seats	Lee Teng-hui	Majority	Lee Teng-hui
1996	183 / 334	5,180,829	49.7%	▼71 seats	Lee Teng-hui	Majority	Lee Teng-hui
2005	117 / 300	1,508,384	38.92%	▼66 seats	Lien Chan	Plurality	Chen Shui-bian

== See also ==
- Kuomintang in Burma
- Elections in Taiwan
- Republic of China Armed Forces
- Republic of China Military Academy

== Notes ==
Language notes
