= Ling Tao =

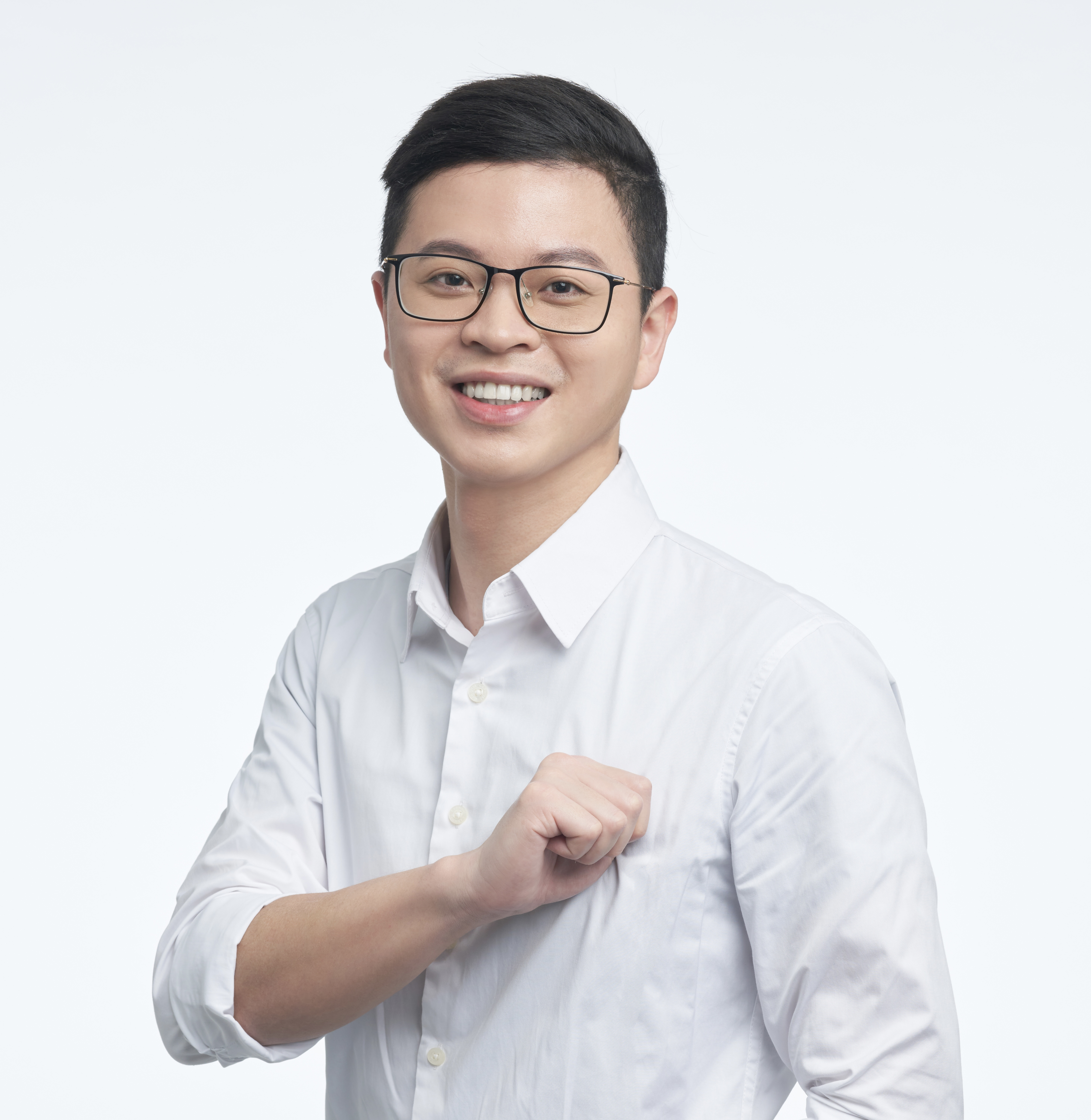
Councilor Ling Tao

Ling Tao (born October 22, 1989) is a Taiwanese politician of the Kuomintang (KMT). He is the second nationwide at-large legislator, following Wang Hao-yu, and was born in Taixi Township, Yunlin County. He currently serves as a Taoyuan City Councilor . He has previously served as Deputy Chief Executive Officer of the KMT-affiliated National Policy Foundation during Eric Chu’s tenure, 7th KMT Youth Corps National Head concurrently appointed as a Central Standing Committee member, Director of the KMT Culture and Communications Committee, Spokesperson for Eric Chu’s Office, and Spokesperson for the KMT’s 2024 presidential and legislative election platform.

== Biography ==
Ling Tao was born in Taixi Township, Yunlin County. After graduating from National Taichung First Senior High School, he studied in the Department of Political Science at National Chengchi University, where he obtained his bachelor’s degree in 2011. In 2013, he earned a master’s degree from the Institute of Management Science at National Chiao Tung University.

In August 2011, Ling entered the Kuomintang’s party affairs through the “Taiwan Go Go” initiative. In September 2012, he was elected 7th National Head of the KMT Youth Corps, concurrently serving as a Central Standing Committee member.

After completing military service in 2014, Ling joined Eric Chu’s New Taipei City mayoral campaign team as Head of the Events Division , and later served as Confidential Secretary at the New Taipei City Government’s Department of Civil Affairs. He subsequently received the KMT Sun Yat-sen Scholarship (Political Division) and went to Cornell University to pursue a master’s degree, which he completed in 2018. After returning to Taiwan in 2019, he became Spokesperson for Eric Chu’s Office .

During his tenure as spokesperson, Ling frequently rebutted statements made by then–Premier Su Tseng-chang , and engaged in political confrontations with figures such as Lin Fei-fan and Chen Po-wei of the pan-Green camp. Media reports described him as a young political talent cultivated by former and incumbent New Taipei City mayors Eric Chu and Hou You-yi, and as a potential candidate in the 2022 Twin Cities (Taipei–New Taipei) city council elections. During the 11th KMT Chairperson Election held in September 2021, he was responsible for media and publicity planning for Eric Chu’s campaign.

In October 2021, Ling assumed office as Director of the KMT Culture and Communications Committee .

On March 24, 2022, he announced his resignation from the position of Director in order to run in the Taoyuan City First Electoral District council election, in which he was elected.

== Controversies ==
=== Defamation Lawsuit Filed by Chen Chi-chung ===
On September 29, 2022, Ling Tao, Chang Szu-kang, and Yang Chih-yu held a press conference titled “Chen Chi-chung: Serial Plagiarist and Fraud Artist—From Researcher to Project Director”, questioning whether Chen Chi-chung was a habitual plagiarist. In response, Chen Chi-chung filed a defamation lawsuit against the three.In January 2024, the Taipei District Court ruled in the first instance that Ling and the others had failed to fulfill their duty of verification, sentencing Ling to 55 days of detention, convertible into a fine. In October 2024, the Taiwan High Court ruled that the matter constituted an issue subject to public scrutiny and reversed the verdict, acquitting Ling Tao .

=== U.S. Visit Controversy ===
According to Mirror Weekly, during a delegation visit to the United States in July 2024, Ling Tao allegedly verbally abused diplomats, citing perceived favoritism toward the ruling party in itinerary arrangements and insufficient time allocated for shopping, and also allegedly demanded that diplomats drink alcohol with him . Ling denied the report, stating that he was protesting, not berating officials .

=== Accusations of Plagiarism in Master’s Thesis ===
In October 2024, scholar Chen Shih-fen accused Ling Tao of plagiarism in his master’s thesis at National Chiao Tung University. Ling responded that the thesis had already passed academic review and that there were no issues . In response, National Yang Ming Chiao Tung University issued a statement saying that Ling’s master’s thesis failed to properly cite sources and violated academic ethics, and that the thesis had since been revised and replaced .

=== Sexual Harassment Allegations ===
In March 2025, according to Mirror Weekly, an individual identified as F accused Ling Tao of repeatedly sending sexually explicit private images via messaging apps between 2017, 2018, and 2021, constituting sexual harassment. Another individual, W, accused Ling of touching his chest area while intoxicated. Additionally, when W discussed the matter with friends in political and media circles, one acquaintance told W that they too had been touched on intimate areas by Ling Tao while he was drunk .

In response to the reports and sexual harassment allegations, Ling Tao stated that all accusations were fabricated by the Democratic Progressive Party (DPP) , demanded that anonymous accusers reveal their identities, and threatened to collect evidence and file lawsuits . Mirror Weekly responded that its reports were published only after thorough journalistic verification, that anonymity was intended to protect the individuals involved, and that Ling’s statements constituted the use of public influence to intimidate accusers, evade media oversight, and divert attention from the core issues.
