= Chi Pang-yuan =

Taiwanese translator and professor of English literature (1924–2024)

- 齊邦媛
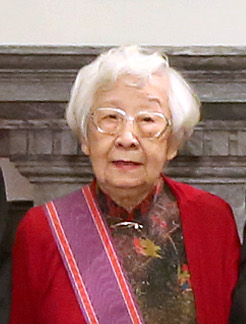
- Chi in 2015
- Born: 19 February 1924; Tieling County, Liaoning, Republic of China
- Died: 28 March 2024 (aged 100); Guishan District, Taoyuan, Taiwan
- Education: Wuhan University
- Spouse: Luo Yuchang (m. 1948; died 2012)
- Children: 3
- Parent: Chi Shi-ying

Chinese name
- Traditional Chinese: 齊邦媛
- Simplified Chinese: 齐邦媛
Transcriptions
Standard Mandarin
- Hanyu Pinyin: Qí Bāngyuán
- Wade–Giles: Ch'i^{2} Pang^{1}-yüan^{2}

Chi Pang-yuan (Chinese: 齊邦媛; pinyin: Qí Bāngyuàn; 19 February 1924 – 28 March 2024) was a Manchurian-born Taiwanese writer, academic, and Chinese–English translator. She was instrumental in introducing Taiwanese literature to the Western World through translations. She is also known for her autobiography The Great Flowing River (2009).

== Education and career ==
Chi's father, Chi Shi-ying, was a politician and intelligence officer affiliated with the Kuomintang's CC Clique, as well as a personal secretary to Chen Li-fu. Chi herself held the CC Clique in high regard, describing it as the liberal faction within the Kuomintang. She cited several examples to support this view, including her father's career, Chen Li-fu's late-life advocacy for depoliticizing textbooks, and Liang Su-yung's defense of Lei Chen.

Chi studied English literature at Wuhan University under the tutelage of Zhu Guangqian and Wu Mi. In 1947, she became a teacher of English at National Taiwan University. In 1956, she went to the United States on the Fulbright Exchange Teachers' Program and in 1967, she went to St. Mary-of-the-Woods College as a Fulbright scholar again. She enrolled at Indiana University Bloomington in 1968, but returned to Taiwan six credits away from completing a Master of Arts degree due to family matters.

In 1969, Chi founded and served as head of the Department of Foreign Languages and Literatures at National Chung Hsing University. In the 70s, while working at the National Institute for Compilation and Translation, she pushed for the de-politicization of the mandatory Chinese textbooks in Taiwan and started translating Taiwanese literature into English. From 1977 to 1988, she was professor of English literature at NTU and was granted emeritus status after retiring. Chi subsequently became editor-in-chief of The Taipei Chinese PEN.

Chi's autobiography, The Great Flowing River, is a bestseller in the Sinophone world. It has been translated into English, German, and Japanese.

President Chen Shui-bian awarded Chi the Order of Propitious Clouds in 2004. In 2015, Chen's successor Ma Ying-jeou awarded Chi the Order of Brilliant Star.

Chi turned 100 in early 2024 and died on 28 March of the same year.
