= Chi Shi-ying =

Chinese Politician (1899–1987)

- 齊世英
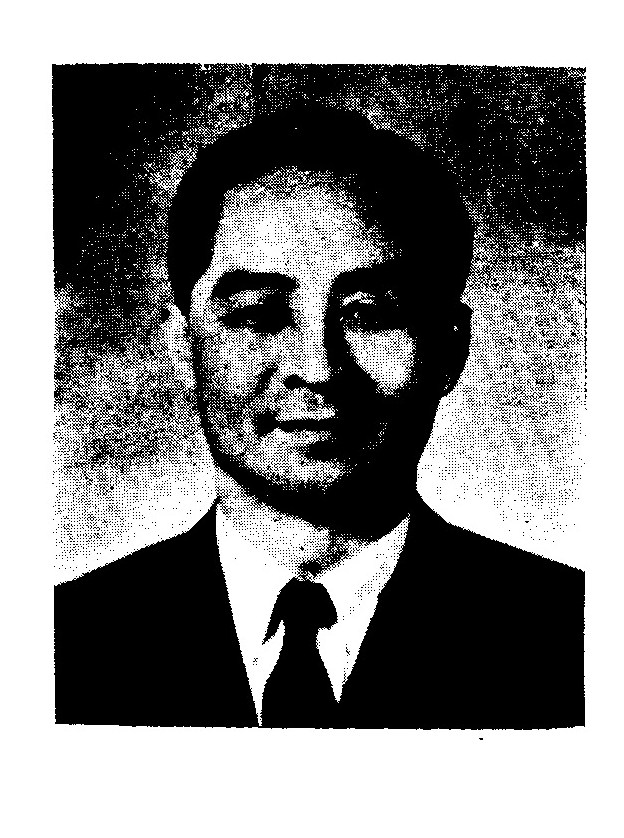

Personal details
- Born: October 4, 1899 Liaoning, China
- Died: August 8, 1987 (aged 87) Taipei, Taiwan
- Party: China Democracy Party (1960)
- Other political affiliations: Kuomintang (until 1954)
- Children: Chi Pang-yuan
- Relatives: Luo Yuchang (son-in-law)
- Occupation: Politician, intelligence officer, dissident
- Known for: Kuomintang resistance leader in Manchuria, co-founder of the China Democracy Party

Chi Shi-ying (simplified Chinese: 齐世英; traditional Chinese: 齊世英; pinyin: Qí Shìyīng; October 4, 1899 – August 8, 1987) was a Chinese politician, intelligence officer, and dissident. As a close confidant and secretary to Chen Li-fu, as well as a member of the CC Clique, Chi was one of the key leaders of Kuomintang resistance in Manchuria during the Second Sino-Japanese War. In 1954, he was expelled from the Party by Chiang Kai-shek. Following his expulsion, he co-founded the China Democracy Party in 1960 alongside Hu Shih and Lei Chen.

== Biography ==
Chi was born in 1899 to a landlord family in Liaoning; his father served as an officer under Zhang Zuolin. In 1916, he went to Japan for further studies. After completing preparatory courses at the First Higher School, he attended the Fourth Higher School in Kanazawa, later entering Kyoto University to study philosophy. He subsequently continued his education in Germany, studying philosophy and economics at Humboldt University of Berlin, the University of Leipzig, and Heidelberg University.

In 1925, Chi participated in General Guo Songling's rebellion against Zhang Zuolin. He was in charge of external affairs and, together with Yin Ju-keng and Lin Changmin, served as one of Guo's key aides. Following the rebellion's failure, Chi and the core staff sought refuge at the Japanese embassy, evading Zhang Zuolin's pursuit.

From 1925 to 1926, Chi and five of his aides took refuge in the Japanese consulate with the assistance of consul Shigeru Yoshida, while Zhang Zuolin’s forces besieged the compound. In 1926, he escaped via Korea to Japan and later moved to Shanghai, where he joined the Kuomintang and the CC Clique, becoming a close associate and secretary to Chen Lifu.

After the Mukden Incident in 1931, Chi frequently returned to Manchuria on clandestine intelligence missions. According to his daughter Chi Pang-yuan’s memoir *The Great Flowing River*, the family often changed surnames to maintain secrecy and the missions was known only to Chen Lifu during implement. During this period Chi also collaborated with General Ma Zhanshan.

In 1934, he founded the Zhongshan High School of Northeast in Beijing, intended to serve students from Manchuria who had fled south after the Japanese occupation. While it was recognized as the first national secondary school in China for displaced Northeastern youth, later accounts on the mainland criticized Chi for using the institution to expand the influence of the CC Clique through factional and ideological work.

From the 1930s, Chi took an active role in leading resistance movements in Manchuria. In addition to organizing intelligence operations, he publicly established the Northeast Anti-Manchu and Anti-Japanese Association in 1932. At the same time, he worked underground with figures such as 臧启芳, 徐箴, 高惜冰, and 李锡恩 to form the secret “September 18th Alliance” within the Northeast Association, which became a leading force for sustained clandestine resistance.

Following the consolidation of Manchukuo and the signing of the He–Umezu Agreement in 1934, Chi’s activities temporarily subsided. In 1936, however, together with 梅公任, he expanded his intelligence networks by recruiting Chinese students who had studied in Japan, including Lo Ta-yu, 劉世恒, and Liang Su-yung. In 1939, Chi passed leadership of the Northeast resistance operations to Lo Ta-yu and withdrew from direct management.

In 1938, Chi co-founded the magazine *Time and Tide* (時與潮) with 金長佑. After 金 briefly served as president and editor-in-chief, Chi assumed both roles and continued to lead the publication until its closure in 1949. The magazine focused on analysis of international and domestic affairs, as well as cultural commentary and social observation.

Although Chi withdrew from direct leadership of intelligence operations in Manchuria after 1939, he remained the Kuomintang’s top party official in the region. According to the official biography of legislator Liang Su-rong, following World War II the Kuomintang’s takeover of Manchuria was dominated by the CC Clique under Chi and Wang De-pu, while the administrative apparatus was taken over by Xiong Shihui's Political Science Clique (政學系). In the first Legislative Yuan, nearly all legislators elected from Manchuria were associated with Chi, with the exception of a dozen members aligned with Zhu Jiahua and a few affiliated with the Three Principles of the People Youth Corps led by Chen Cheng and Chiang Ching-kuo.

In the 1950s, following the death of Chen Guo-fu and the exile of Chen Li-fu, the influence of the CC Clique gradually waned. Chi Shih-ying emerged as the new leader of the CC Clique within the Legislative Yuan, steering the faction toward liberal policies. His protégé Liang Su-rong recalled in his memoirs that after the CC members relocated to Taiwan, the faction was largely dispersed, with many taking government positions or being reassigned to the central government. During this period, Chi provided financial and organizational support to keep his followers united in the pursuit of democracy and the rule of law. Reports also noted that the CC Clique practiced collective leadership, jointly led by Chi, Chang Tao-fan, Cheng Tien-fong, and Shao Hua.

In 1954, Chi was expelled from the Kuomintang by Chiang Kai-shek after opposing Premier Chen Cheng's proposal to raise electricity prices. From then until 1960, he became active in the Tangwai ("outside the party") movement, working with Lei Chen, Hu Shih, Kao Yu-shu, and Li Wan-chu to organize the China Democracy Party. Chi revised the movement’s original platform from "overthrowing the Kuomintang" to "opposing the ruling clique of the Kuomintang," stating: "Today the Kuomintang has committed many wrongdoings, but these are only the actions of a small ruling clique. Many Kuomintang members also deeply resent this. If we attack all Kuomintang members as a whole, it would be unfair. Moreover, our strength is limited, and when we succeed, many Kuomintang members who care about the nation can join us."

Contemporaries frequently commented on Chi’s considerable political influence within the Kuomintang and the Legislative Yuan. According to Democratic Progressive Party legislator and Taiwan independence activist Roger Hsieh, Chi, as leader of the CC Clique, was capable of mobilizing half of the Kuomintang legislators to support the opposition, potentially enabling Lei Chen to assume the congress. Liang Su-jung also noted that Chiang Kai-shek once accosted Zhang Daofen, "Do these members of the Legislative Yuan listen to Chi Shih-ying, or to me?" Hsieh Han-ju (謝漢儒), a co-founder of the China Democratic Party, also noted that Chi was able to influence more than one hundred legislators within the Legislative Yuan.
