= Liu Wen-hsiung =

Liu Wen-hsiung (劉文雄) may refer to:

- Liu Wen-hsiung (1954–2017), Taiwanese politician, member of the Kuomintang and later the People First Party, served on the Legislative Yuan from 1999 to 2008
- Liu Wen-hsiung (1941–1990), Taiwanese politician, member of the Democratic Progressive Party, served on the Legislative Yuan in 1990
- Edwin Liu, Taiwanese businessman and engineer
- Icyang Parod (born 1960), Taiwanese Amis politician
