= Cheng Tsang-po =

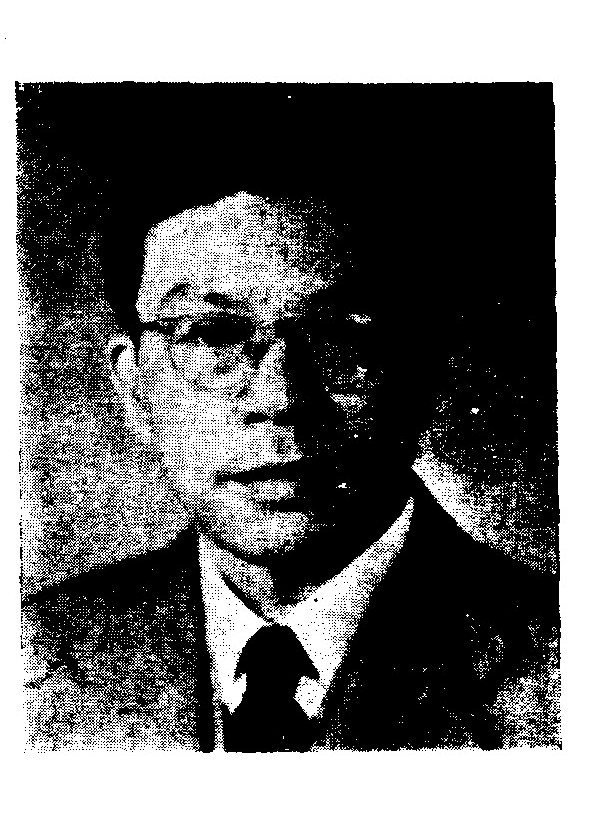
- Cheng's official portrait as legislator, 1948

Members of the 1st Legislative Yuan
- In office 1948–1990
- Constituency: Press Association

Personal details
- Born: March 6, 1903 Jiangsu, Qing dynasty
- Died: July 21, 1990 (aged 87) Taipei, Taiwan
- Spouse: Chien Yun-chu
- Children: 3
- Occupation: Journalist, politician

Cheng Tsang-po (Chinese: 程滄波; born Cheng Chung-hsing, 程中行; March 6, 1903 – July 21, 1990) was a Chinese journalist and politician. A member of the CC Clique within the Kuomintang, he was elected as a legislator in 1948. In 1958, Cheng led a boycott with Chi Shi-ying against a publishing law that restricted freedom of speech.
