= Shenyang Northeastern High School =

Shenyang Northeastern High School may refer to:

- Zhongshan High School of Northeast
- Northeast Yucai School
