= Huang Hua (activist) =

Taiwanese activist

- 黃華
- Born: 16 August 1939 (age 86); Kirun, Taihoku, Taiwan, Empire of Japan
- Political party: Democratic Progressive Party (until 2005); Taiwan Solidarity Union (after 2005); Taiwanese National Party (since 2011)
- Spouse: Wu Pao-yu

Huang Hua (Chinese: 黃華; born 16 August 1939) is a Taiwanese activist. He was repeatedly jailed for advocating Taiwanese independence and democratization. Huang spent over twenty years in prison and was named a prisoner of conscience by Amnesty International.

== Activism ==
=== Early activism and imprisonment ===
A native of Keelung born in 1939, Huang worked with Lei Chen in 1960 to form a political party, the China Democracy Party, with several others. As Taiwan was under martial law at the time, the pair's actions were illegal. Huang contested the Keelung City Council election of 1963, but was arrested before completing registration, and jailed for two and a half years. In 1967, Huang cofounded the Society to Promote the Unity of Taiwanese Youth, and was charged with sedition. Sentenced to ten years imprisonment, he was granted amnesty in 1975. Huang then worked for Kuo Yu-hsin and the tangwai publication Taiwan Political Review, run by Kang Ning-hsiang. Though Kang asked him to carefully consider his involvement, Huang joined the Review in December 1975, as a deputy editor. Soon after the Review was suspended, Huang opened a noodle shop with Chang Chun-hung. In July 1976, Huang was arrested for his writings in the Review. During his third prison term, Huang was designated a prisoner of conscience by Amnesty International. His mother died in February 1984, and Huang was prohibited from leaving Green Island to attend her funeral, held the next month. Huang began a hunger strike in April 1985, to show solidarity with fellow political prisoner Shih Ming-teh. Though it was reported that Huang began eating in August, he chose to continue his protest in September. Huang was moved to Jen-ai Prison in 1986.

After Huang was paroled in 1987, he joined the Association of Political Prisoners. Later, Huang organized a nationwide march for independence in November 1988. The following year, Huang formally founded the New Nation Alliance, linked to a movement of the same name. He was barred from contesting the 1989 legislative elections because limitations on his civil rights were still in effect. For his association with the New Nation movement, Huang was convicted of sedition by the Taiwan High Court shortly after the elections were held. Subsequently, backed by the Democratic Progressive Party, Huang Hua declared his candidacy for the presidency, a symbolic move and violation of electoral law, as the president of the Republic of China was selected by the National Assembly, not directly elected by popular vote. President Lee Teng-hui fully restored Huang's civil rights in May 1990. Despite Lee's action, Huang was arrested after attending the funeral of Liu Wen-hsiung in November. Huang was sentenced to another ten years in prison, and did not appeal. He was not considered for amnesty in January 1991. His continued imprisonment was described by United States Senators Ted Kennedy, Claiborne Pell, Joe Lieberman, John Kerry, and Paul Wellstone as a "serious setback" to Taiwan's democratization in a letter to Lee Teng-hui. Lin Tsung-kuang nominated Huang for the Nobel Peace Prize later that month, and a march protesting Huang's imprisonment was held in February. By May, Huang had become Taiwan's final political prisoner. After Huang's imprisonment came to international attention, the Legislative Yuan began discussing revisions to Article 100 of the Criminal Code. He remained in prison through the National Assembly elections held in December 1991. After Article 100 of the Criminal Code was amended in May 1992, Huang was released.

=== 2019 hunger strike ===
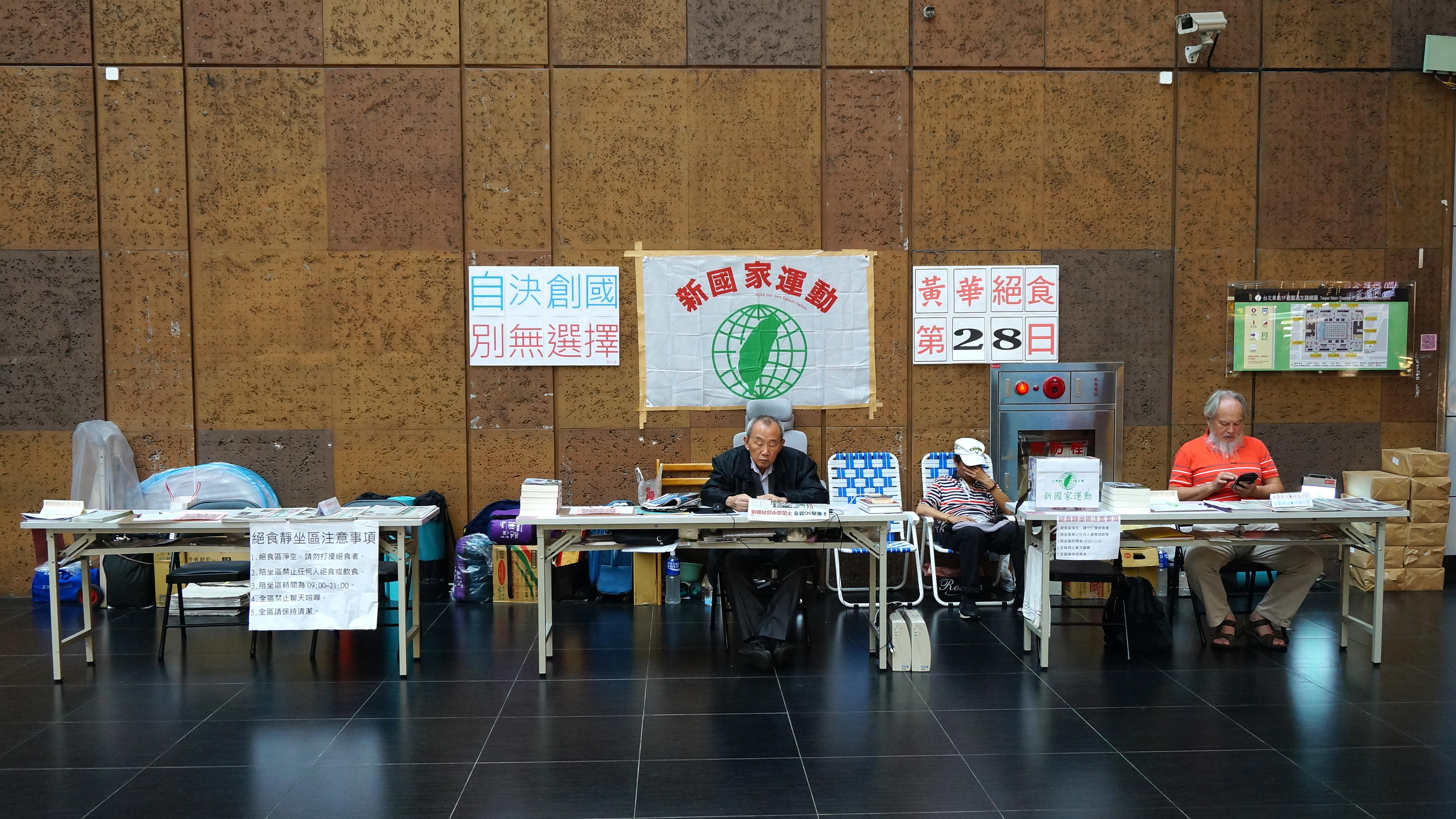
Huang at Taipei Main Station on 15 June 2019, during his hunger strike.

Huang began fasting on 19 May 2019 in support of a petition advocating Taiwan independence. He called for small political parties and other political organizations to form a coalition and replace the Kuomintang as Taiwan's second major party. During his hunger strike, Huang's conversion to Christianity was overseen by a Presbyterian Church in Taiwan official. Supporters of Huang's hunger strike included several former members of the Democratic Progressive Party, who called for a new political party advocating Taiwan independence to be established. Huang ended his hunger strike after 52 days, and agreed to go to the hospital on 9 July 2019.

== Formal political activity ==
Huang served in the presidential administration of Chen Shui-bian as a national policy adviser. He also assumed the chairmanship of the Taiwan-Mongolia Exchange Association. In 2005, he left the Democratic Progressive Party for the Taiwan Solidarity Union. Upon the founding of the Taiwan National Party in July 2011, Huang served as its first chairman. Under his leadership, the TNP nominated its founder Chang Mung-hsieh as presidential candidate for the 2012 elections, and joined with other civic organizations to sue the Supreme Prosecutors’ Office Special Investigation Panel. Huang was succeeded by acting chairman Kao Chin-lang before Tsai Chin-lung took office in 2013.

== Personal life ==
Huang's wife Wu Pao-yu served on the Taoyuan County Council.
