= China Democracy Party (Taiwan) =

China Democracy Party 中國民主黨
- Newspaper: Free China Journal
- Ideology: Liberalism; Liberal democracy Anti-Chiangism
- Political position: Centre

The China Democracy Party was a failed political organization of the Republic of China from 4 May to 4 September 1960 in an attempt to establish it as an opposition party.

In 1949, Lei Chen, Hu Shih, Wang Shijie, and Han Lih-wu founded the Free China Journal in Shanghai. The publication was initially friendly to Chiang Kai-shek and the KMT, but comments criticizing them gradually began to appear.

On May 4, 1960, Lei Chen announced 'why we desperately need a strong opposition' (我們為什麼迫切需要一個強有力的反對黨), strongly insisting on the opposition's participation in elections to keep the ruling party in check. On May 18, non-KMT figures held an election improvement review meeting to demand the creation of a new political party and the realization of fair elections and true democracy. From this day on, the resolution organized a 'local election improvement forum' and immediately prepared to organize an opposition party.

The Democracy Party received support from liberal factions within three legal parties, including the CC Clique of Kuomintang, the China Democratic Socialist Party , and the Young China Party. Within the Kuomintang, the CC Clique’s legislative leader Chi Shi-ying backed the idea of an opposition party, while Yang Yu-zi of the CDSP and Hsia Tao-sheng of the YCP also expressed support. Chi Shi-ying once told Lei Chen that many CC Clique members favored the establishment of an opposition party.

On September 4, 1960, some members of the party were imprisoned after a military trial and sentenced to 10 years in prison.

== History ==
main source of this section:

Hsieh Han-ju (謝漢儒), who served as a co-convener of the China Democratic Party and later became chairman of the China Democratic Socialist Party, argued that the party’s origins could be traced back to the convergence of three political currents during the 1950s. The first came from liberal scholars such as Hu Shih, 張佛泉, 崔書琴, 王聿修, Yin Haiguang, and 夏道平. The second included suppressed members of the Young China Party (YCP), the China Democratic Socialist Party (CDSP), and independent politicians like 楊毓滋, 夏濤聲, Chi Shi-ying, and Hsieh himself. The third drew on native Taiwanese democratic activists such as Henry Kao, 李萬居, 吳三連, and Hsu Shih-hsien. According to Hsieh, the Kuomintang’s repressive policies, manipulation of elections, and 陶希聖 and Ni Wen-ya's politely but perfunctory handling of political negotiations with the CDSP—represented by—ultimately pushed these three currents to merge into a united opposition movement.

In 1957, pro-democracy figures including Yu Teng-fa, Lei Chen, 蔣勻田, 郭雨新, and 謝漢儒 convened a meeting of candidates under the title "Third Session of Mayoral and Provincial Assembly Candidates of the Opposition and Independents," calling for an end to electoral manipulation, political reform, and the realization of democracy. In 1958, they sought to establish the China Association for Local Autonomy Studies, but the application was rejected by the provincial government. In 1960, Lei Chen invited Chi Shi-ying, 蔣勻田, 吳三連, 李萬居, 李秋遠, 郭雨新, 夏濤聲, Henry Kao, and 謝漢儒 to plan further action, leading to the founding of the Election Reform Study Committee. Its first presidium meeting was held on 25 May 1960, chaired by Lei, and attended by Chi Shi-ying, 楊毓滋, 夏濤聲, 吳三連, 謝漢儒, Henry Kao, 李萬居, 郭雨新, Hsu Shih-hsien, 王地, and 傅正.

On 18 May 1960, shortly after its establishment, the Election Reform Study Committee repeatedly condemned the Kuomintang’s electoral fraud. The next day, Minister of the Interior Lien Chen-tung held an emergency press conference, stating that "the six accusations raised by the Committee against the government are entirely untrue." Lien further emphasized that "the government has never sheltered any political party and has actively invited impartial members of society to supervise electoral fairness. The government will only dissuade provincial assembly members from matters that go beyond their proper concerns, because the political views of provincial assembly members should be limited to provincial affairs and should not be designed as national-level platforms." On 4 June, Premier Chen Cheng also held a press conference, declaring: "In a democratic country there must, of course, be an opposition party. However, an opposition party must have its own position and platform, and it must not undermine the government’s efforts to build Taiwan in accordance with the Three Principles of the People. If an opposition party is merely a clique of disappointed politicians and local ruffians, then I oppose it." In response, on 15 June the Committee issued a statement directly accusing Lien of being "the mastermind and chief executor of all fraudulent practices in Taiwan," demanding his immediate resignation as minister, which triggered a major public controversy.

== See also ==
- Liberalism in China
- Tangwai movement
- White Terror (Taiwan)
