= Huang Hua (disambiguation) =

Huang Hua (1913–2010) was a foreign minister of China.

Huang Hua may also refer to:

- Huang Hua (military leader) (1911–1943), military leader of the Chinese Communist Party; the city of Huanghua in Hebei Province is named after him
- Huang Hua (activist) (born 1939), Taiwanese independence activist
- Huang Hua (badminton) (born 1969), female Chinese badminton player

== See also ==
- Huanghua (disambiguation)
