= Huanghua (disambiguation) =

Huanghua is a city in Hebei, China.

Huanghua may refer to:

- Huanghua, Changsha, Hunan, China
- Huanghua, Hubei, a town in Yiling District, Hubei, China
- Huanghua, a nickname of Empress Mu of China's Northern Qi Dynasty
- Huanghuacheng, a village near the Great Wall of China, in Huairou, Beijing

== See also ==
- Huang Hua (disambiguation)
