= Yin Haiguang =

- 殷海光
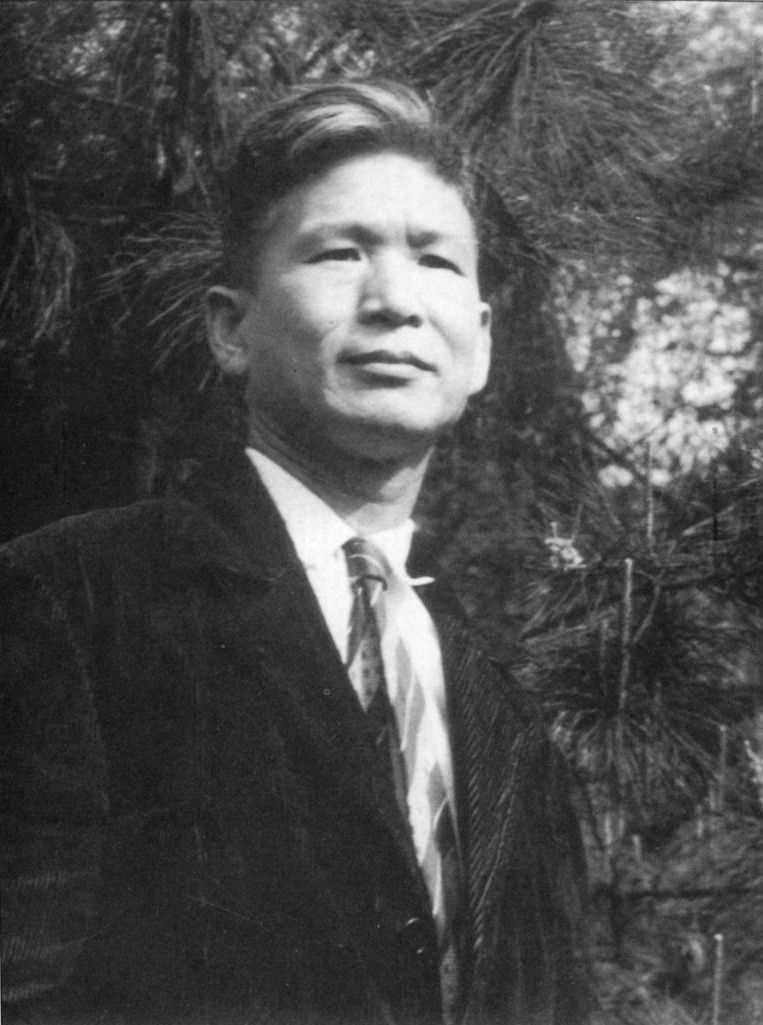
- Born: Yin Fusheng (殷福生); 5 December 1919; Huanggang, Hubei, Republic of China
- Died: 16 September 1969 (aged 49); Taipei, Taiwan, Republic of China
- Education: Southwest Associated University; Tsinghua University
- Occupations: Author, educator, philosopher
- Spouse: Xia Junlu (m. 1953–1969)
- Children: 1
- Writing career
- Language: Chinese, English
- Period: 1946–1967
- Genre: Essay
- Notable works: The Complete Works of Yin Haiguang; Chinese translation of The Road to Serfdom

Yin Haiguang (Chinese: 殷海光; pinyin: Yīn Hǎiguāng; 5 December 1919 – 16 September 1969) was a Chinese author, educator and philosopher.

== Biography ==
Yin was born to missionary parents in Huanggang, Hubei, in December 1919 and was raised in Wuchang. His uncle, Yin Ziheng (殷子衡), was a revolutionist who took part in Xinhai Revolution.

At the age of 13, he studied at Wuchang Middle School (武昌中學). When he was a high school student, he started to be interested in philosophy. Before he reached the age of 20, he translated a textbook on logic, which ran more than 400 pages, from English to Chinese. He helped introduce Western thinkers and philosophers such as Bertrand Russell, Karl Popper and Frederick von Hayek to liberal Chinese intellectuals. Jin Yuelin had a strong influence on his youth.

In 1938, he entered Southwest Associated University, majoring in philosophy. In 1942, He was accepted to Tsinghua University and graduated in 1945. Upon his graduation, he joined the Youth Army. He returned to Chongqing after eight months.

In 1946, he worked in Central Daily News as an editor. Meanwhile, he taught philosophy at the University of Nanking.

In 1949, along with the relocation of Central Daily News, Yin settled in Taiwan. He began teaching philosophy at National Taiwan University and became an editor of the semi-monthly Free China Journal (FCJ). Along with other intellectuals from his circle, Yin used the FCJ to publish articles that were at times highly critical of the Kuomintang. In 1960, the authorities lost patience and shut down the FCJ. A crackdown followed which led to Yin being banned from teaching and lecturing. After that, he withdrew from public life.

In 1954, Yin went to Harvard University as a visiting scholar and returned to Taiwan the year after. However, he suffered from political persecution since then.

Yin's view was that Chinese liberalism was inauthentic and lacking in normative substance. He believed that liberalism failed in China because liberalism provided no solutions to the country's national difficulties and because Chinese liberals themselves misconstrued the strains of Western thought from which they drew inspiration. Yin commented that Chinese liberals had "a premature birth marked by postnatal disorders."

In 1969, Yin died of gastric cancer when he was 49.

Since 2003, the house in which he lived in Taipei, near Taiwan National University, has been listed as a historic landmark and can be visited by the public.

== Works ==
- The Complete Works of Yin Haiguang (殷海光全集)

== Translation ==
- The Road to Serfdom (Friedrich Hayek) (到奴役之路)

== Personal life ==
In October 1953, Yin married Xia Junlu (夏君璐; d. 2013), he had a daughter Yin Wenli (殷文麗; b. March 1956). His daughter and son-in-law now live in the United States.
