= Erlin, Changhua =

Urban township in Changhua County, Taiwan

Coordinates: 23.922875°N 120.409073°E

Erlin Township 二林鎮 Erhlin
- Urban township
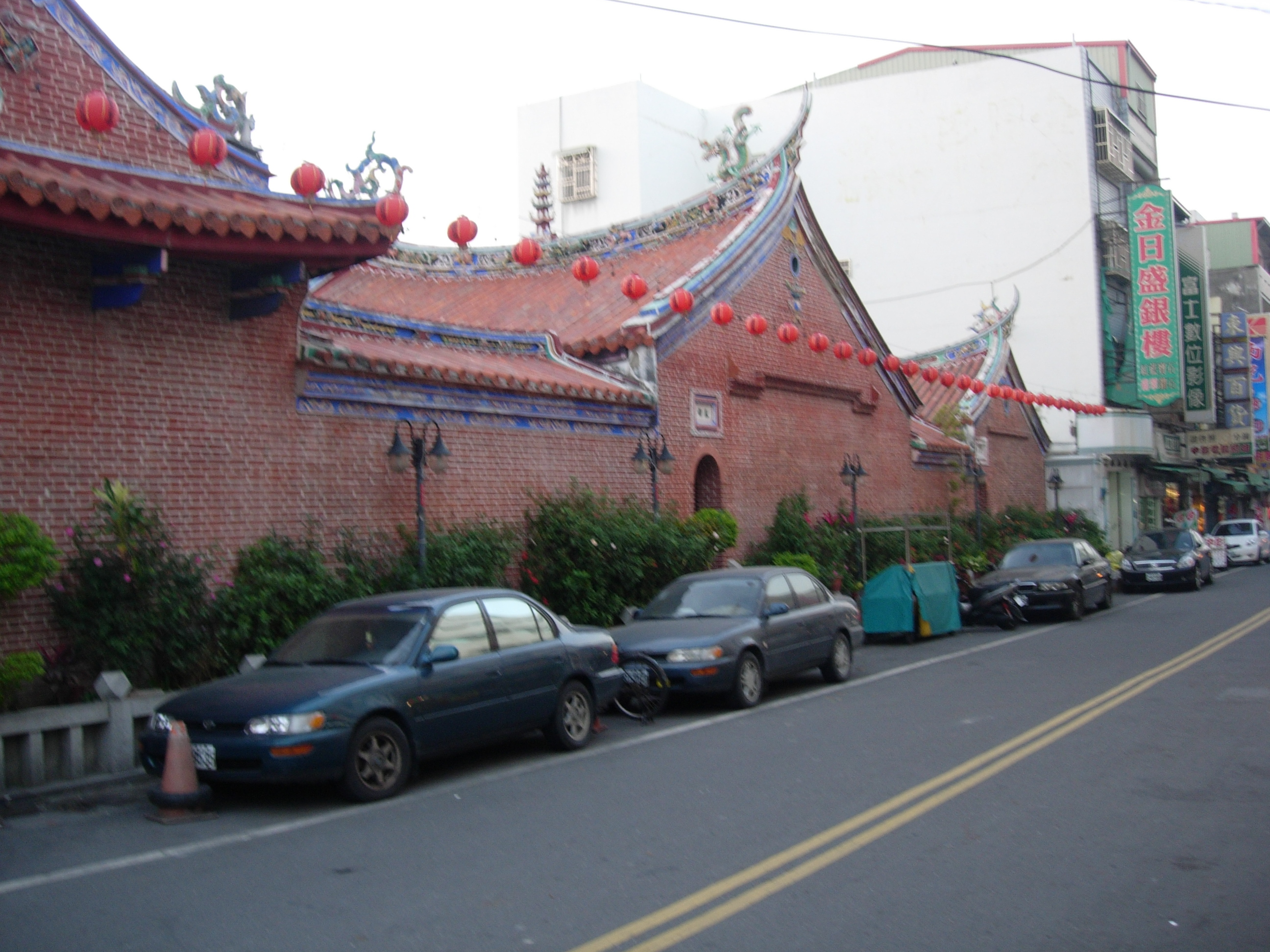

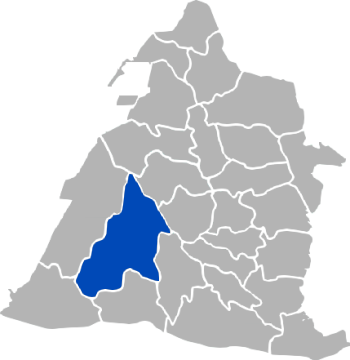
- Erlin Township in Changhua County
- Location: Changhua County, Taiwan

Area
  - Total: 93 km^{2} (36 sq mi)

Population (January 2023)
  - Total: 48,379
  - Density: 520/km^{2} (1,300/sq mi)
- Website: www.chcg.gov.tw/TSO/erlin/index.aspx (in Chinese)

Erlin Township (Chinese: 二林鎮; pinyin: Èrlín Zhèn; Pe̍h-ōe-jī: Jī-lîm-tìn/Gī-lîm-tìn) is an urban township in Changhua County, Taiwan.

== Geography ==
With an area of 92.8578 square kilometers, it is the largest township in Changhua County. As of January 2023, its population was 48,379, including 24,774 males and 23,605 females.

== History ==
During the Dutch period, the area was under the administrative region of Favorlang (modern-day Huwei, Yunlin). Present-day Erlin was probably at or near Gierim, "one of the primary centers for Sino-aboriginal trade and a favorite haunt of pirates and smugglers."

== Administrative divisions ==
Fengtian, Donghe, Nanguang, Xiping, Beiping, Zhongxi, Guangxing, Xiangtian, Waizhu, Xinghua, Dongxing, Houcuo, Dingcuo, Zhaojia, Zhenxing, Wanxing, Yongxing, Xizhuang, Meifang, Hualun, Wange, Dongshi, Dayong, Yuandou, Xidou, Donghua and Fufeng Village.

== Tourist attractions ==
- Renhe Temple

== Transportation ==
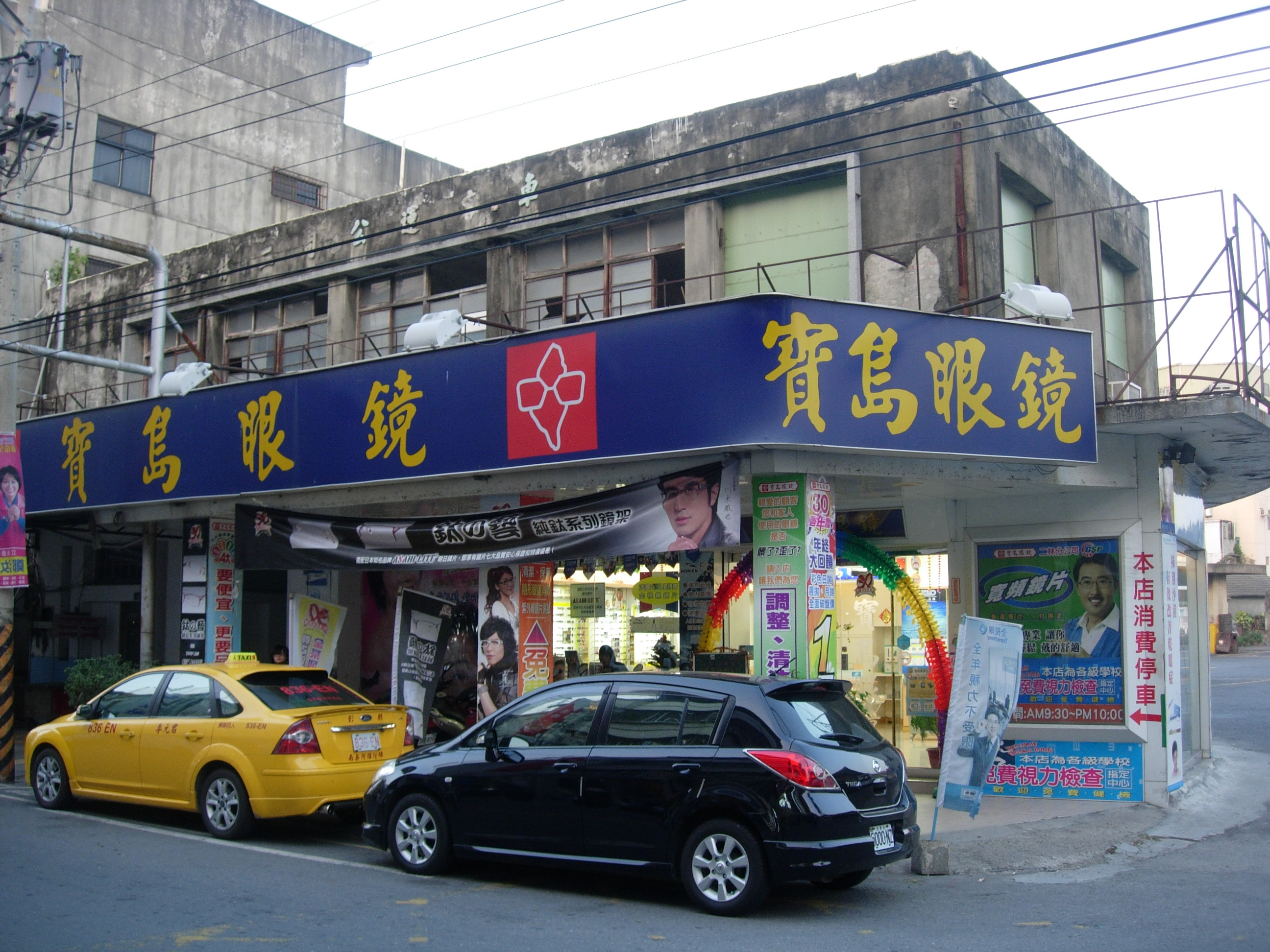
Erlin Bus Station

Bus station in the township is Erlin Bus Station of Yuanlin Bus.

== Notable natives ==
- Liu Wen-hsiung, Member of the Legislative Yuan (1990)
- Liao Yung-lai, Member of the Legislative Yuan (1993–1996), Taichung County magistrate (1997–2001)

== Climate ==
Climate data for Erlin (2016–2023, extremes 2016–present)
Month	Jan	Feb	Mar	Apr	May	Jun	Jul	Aug	Sep	Oct	Nov	Dec	Year
Record high °C (°F)	27.0 (80.6)	30.6 (87.1)	32.8 (91.0)	32.7 (90.9)	34.4 (93.9)	34.8 (94.6)	35.8 (96.4)	34.8 (94.6)	34.3 (93.7)	34.0 (93.2)	32.6 (90.7)	28.6 (83.5)	35.8 (96.4)
Mean daily maximum °C (°F)	20.1 (68.2)	20.5 (68.9)	23.7 (74.7)	26.5 (79.7)	29.6 (85.3)	31.7 (89.1)	32.7 (90.9)	32.0 (89.6)	31.3 (88.3)	28.8 (83.8)	26.0 (78.8)	22.0 (71.6)	27.1 (80.7)
Daily mean °C (°F)	16.5 (61.7)	16.7 (62.1)	19.6 (67.3)	22.9 (73.2)	26.1 (79.0)	28.1 (82.6)	29.1 (84.4)	28.6 (83.5)	27.8 (82.0)	25.1 (77.2)	22.2 (72.0)	18.4 (65.1)	23.4 (74.2)
Mean daily minimum °C (°F)	14.0 (57.2)	14.0 (57.2)	16.6 (61.9)	19.7 (67.5)	23.3 (73.9)	25.3 (77.5)	26.2 (79.2)	25.8 (78.4)	25.0 (77.0)	22.3 (72.1)	19.5 (67.1)	15.7 (60.3)	20.6 (69.1)
Record low °C (°F)	4.2 (39.6)	7.4 (45.3)	10.4 (50.7)	12.3 (54.1)	15.2 (59.4)	22.4 (72.3)	22.6 (72.7)	22.9 (73.2)	21.0 (69.8)	14.8 (58.6)	14.8 (58.6)	8.4 (47.1)	4.2 (39.6)
Average precipitation mm (inches)	31.4 (1.24)	21.1 (0.83)	46.4 (1.83)	59.6 (2.35)	151.9 (5.98)	323.2 (12.72)	136.1 (5.36)	249.9 (9.84)	52.4 (2.06)	9.9 (0.39)	11.8 (0.46)	19.9 (0.78)	1,113.6 (43.84)
Average precipitation days	5.2	4.2	6.8	5.9	8.9	12.6	8.7	12.0	5.6	2.2	2.8	2.6	77.5
Average relative humidity (%)	85.8	85.5	84.8	84.3	87.6	87.3	85.0	88.9	85.8	82.5	84.8	82.6	85.4
Source 1: Central Weather Administration
Source 2: Atmospheric Science Research and Application Databank (precipitation days and humidity 2015–2023)
