= Chen Po-sheng =

Chinese politician (1891–1957)

- 陳博生
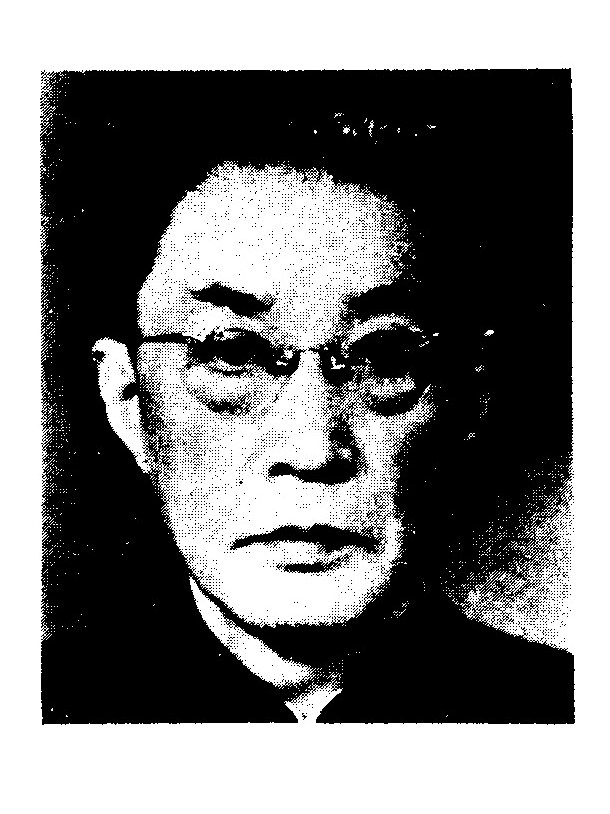

Member of the 1st Legislative Yuan
- In office 1948–1957
- Constituency: Press Association

Personal details
- Born: November 5, 1891 Fuzhou, Qing dynasty
- Died: August 13, 1957 (aged 65) Taipei, Taiwan
- Party: Kuomintang
- Occupation: Journalist, politician

Chen Po-sheng (Chinese: 陳博生; November 5, 1891 – August 13, 1957) was a Chinese journalist and politician. A member of the CC Clique within the Kuomintang, he played a key role in introducing Marxism to China during the period surrounding the May Fourth Movement. Chen served as the editor-in-chief of both the Central News Agency (Taiwan) and the Central Daily News. In 1948, he was elected as a member of the first Legislative Yuan.
