= Taipei Chinese Center =

The Taipei Chinese Center is a branch of the PEN International. The center was founded in 1930 and is dedicated to promoting literature and the arts, as well as fostering cultural exchange between Taiwan and the international community. The center also encourages creativity, research, and the translation of Taiwanese literature. It also organizes literary salons and other events.

The Taipei Chinese Center was founded in November 1928 in Shanghai, China, by a group of writers and intellectuals, including Lin Yutang, Hu Shi, and Hsu Chih-mo. It was officially established on November 16, 1930, by the P.E.N. International, with Tsai Yuan-Pei as its first president. Temporarily halted during the Second Sino-Japanese War, the center resumed its activities in 1958 after the relocation of the Republic of China’s government to Taiwan, gaining approval from the PEN International. It was then named the Taipei Chinese Center. Today, members of the center include writers, literary critics, editors, translators, media professionals, and more.

Under the presidency of Lin Yutang, the center initiated the publication of the English quarterly journal The Chinese PEN in September 1972. Having been in circulation for over 50 years, it stands as an enduring publication for introducing and translating Taiwanese literary works, playing a crucial role in the international promotion of Taiwanese literature. Since the spring issue of 2017, it was renamed The Taipei Chinese PEN — A Quarterly Journal of Contemporary Chinese Literature from Taiwan. Starting from Spring 2023, it has been renamed as Florescence : A Quarterly Journal of Contemporary Chinese Literature from Taiwan.
