= CC Clique =

Political faction within China's KMT

Ko-hsin Club 革新俱樂部
- Leader: Chen Lifu (de facto)
- Founder: Chen Guofu; Chen Lifu
- Dissolved: Late 1950s
- Ideology: Conservatism (Chinese); Anti-communism (Chinese); Three Principles of the People
- Political position: Right-wing
- Religion: Confucianism
- National affiliation: Kuomintang

The CC Clique (Chinese: CC派; pinyin: CC Pài), or Central Club Clique (Chinese: 中央俱樂部組織; pinyin: Zhōngyāng Jùlèbù Zǔzhī), officially the Ko-hsin Club (Chinese: 革新俱樂部; pinyin: Géxīn Jùlèbù; lit. 'Innovation Club'), was one of the political factions within the Kuomintang (Chinese Nationalist Party), in the Republic of China. It was led by the brothers Chen Guofu and Chen Lifu, nephews of Chen Qimei, who was a mentor of Chiang Kai-shek.

The CC Clique derived much of its influence from its control over the Central Bureau of Investigation and Statistics, a powerful intelligence agency, as well as its dominance over major newspapers. The group was primarily composed of technocrats and civil officials, giving it substantial sway over both policymaking and bureaucratic appointments within the party-state structure.

From the conclusion of the Northern Expedition to the outbreak of the Second Sino-Japanese War, the CC Clique held long-standing control over the Kuomintang’s party apparatus under the authorization of Chiang Kai-shek. At the same time, Chiang also supported the Whampoa-based faction led by Chen Cheng and Hu Zongnan, Kang Tse and He Zhonghan of the Blue Shirt Society. During this decade, intense factional rivalries between the CC Clique and its Whampoa-Blue Shirt counterparts resulted in widespread organizational stagnation, inefficiency, and a tarnished reputation across various party branches, progressively weakening the KMT’s overall authority.

In January 1938, Chen Lifu, then head of the Military Affairs Commission’s Sixth Department—which managed wartime party organization and training—was appointed Minister of Education. The Sixth Department was subsequently merged into the Political Training Department, effectively transferring the party’s powers of organization, propaganda, and training from Chen Lifu to Chen Cheng. In April of the same year, Chiang appointed former CC Clique member Zhu Jiahua as KMT Secretary-General and backed him in curbing the CC faction’s influence, marking a gradual shift in Chiang’s stance from reliance on to confrontation with the CC Clique.

Following the death of Guofu and the forced exile of Lifu, Chi Shi-ying, a prominent member of the CC Clique, rose to leadership within the faction in the Legislative Yuan. During his tenure, Chi steered the group towards a more liberal orientation within the party. However, after his expulsion from the Kuomintang in 1954, the CC Clique gradually lost its political influence.

== History ==
Chen Lifu and his older brother Chen Guofu were nephews of Chen Qimei, who until his assassination by the Chinese warlord Yuan Shikai in 1916 was the mentor of upcoming Nationalist leader Chiang Kai-shek. The Chen brothers established the CC clique within the KMT.

The CC Clique placed loyal followers throughout the party and the government machinery, ensuring influence in the bureaucracy, educational agencies, youth organization and labor unions. The brothers also influenced the KMT's Central Bureau of Investigation and Statistics, one of Chiang's two main police and intelligence bodies. Chen Lifu freely admitted that these units caused considerable criticism (The Storm Clouds, p. 68).

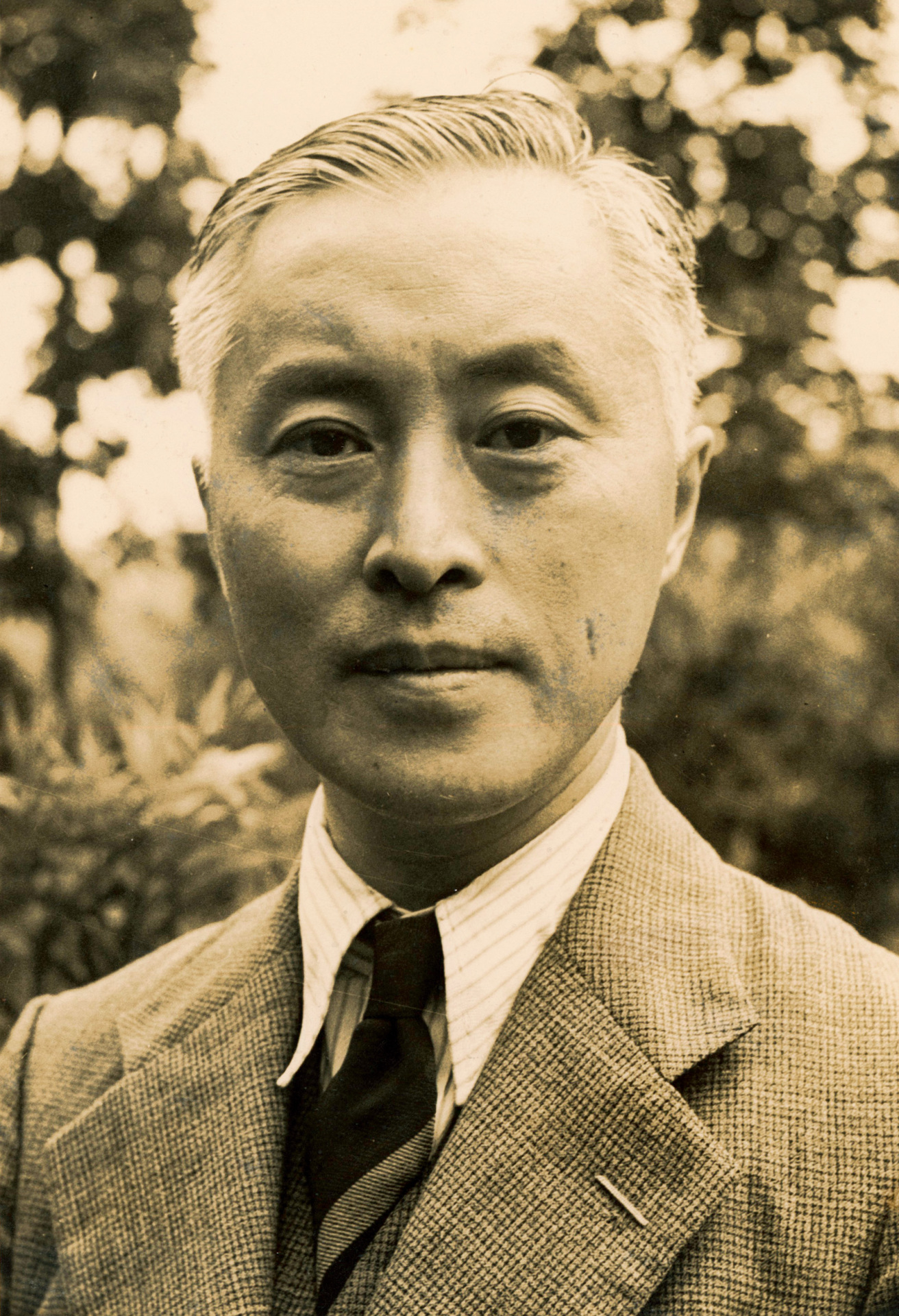
Chen Lifu, leader of the Central Club Clique.

The CC Clique had significant influence over the press, particularly through the Central Daily News. Many key figures within the newspaper were members of the CC Clique or had close ties to the Chen brothers, including Cheng Tsang-po, Chen Po-sheng, Tao Bai-chuan, Hu Chien-chung, and Ma Hsin-yeh. Beyond the Central Daily News, the CC Clique also extended its control over several regional and branch newspapers. For instance, Hu Chien-chung founded the Southeast Daily (東南日報) in Zhejiang, Pan Kung-chan established the Morning Post (晨報) in Shanghai, and Chi Shi-ying was involved in the founding of Time and Tides Magazine (時與潮).

From the conclusion of the Northern Expedition in 1927 until the outbreak of the Second Sino-Japanese War in 1937, the CC Clique maintained dominant control over the Kuomintang’s party affairs, and was also regarded as biggest faction in the party.

Tensions between Chiang Kai-shek and the CC Clique can be traced back to the Kuomintang’s Fifth National Congress in 1935. During the election for Central Executive Committee members, Chen Lifu received more votes than Chiang, provoking criticism from Chiang, the unsuccessful candidates, and Yang Yongtai. Under pressure, Chen resigned as Director of the Central Organization Department and was succeeded by Chang Li-sheng, who was regarded as the leader of the CC Clique’s northern faction and had long differed from Chen over party policy. After assuming office, Chang centered his authority around the North China faction, sought to improve relations with the Whampoa clique-Blue Shirt Society, and began to distance the party apparatus from the CC Clique’s dominance. In response, Chen Guofu admonished Chang, warning him to “stand firm in his position and refrain from attacking his own comrades.”

Beginning in 1937, however, Chiang Kai-shek empowered Zhu Jiahua and Chen Cheng to counterbalance the CC Clique’s influence and promoted the formation of the Three Principles of the People Youth Corps, centered around the Blue Shirt Society, to marginalize the CC faction within the party. Wang Tzu-chuang (王子壯), who had served as Secretary-General of the KMT Central Review Committee, remarked: “In party affairs, Zhu Jiahua bears the greatest responsibility, far exceeding that of Yeh Ch’u-tsang (葉楚傖). Every matter, great or small, is entrusted to Zhu for planning and execution. As for the training of both party and military personnel, the full responsibility lies with Chen Cheng. Thus, the power once held by Chen Lifu over the past decade has rapidly waned.”

As Nanjing was about to fall in December 1937, Executive Yuan councillor Chen Kewen wrote in his diary that the KMT’s presence appeared invisible during wartime while other parties and factions were taking advantage of the weakened central authority. He feared that, in addition to territorial loss, internal division could become “even more frightening.”Following the relocation of the KMT’s central government and party headquarters to Wuhan, organizational disorder heightened criticism directed toward the CC Clique, which oversaw party affairs. Chiang Kai-shek himself publicly rebuked the party’s ineffectiveness, stating that “wherever our troops arrive, there is no sign of party organs or assistance from party members.” The failure of party affairs during this period severely damaged the CC Clique’s standing within the KMT and eroded Chiang’s trust in its leadership.

The Gexin movement included many younger KMT members associated with the CC Clique.

During the 1940s, CC Clique attempted to seize control of the Central Cadre School from Chiang Ching-kuo and obstructed the appointment of Chen Cheng as Premier and Liu Chien-chun as President of the Legislative Yuan (led by legislator Chen Po-sheng). The CC Clique also frequently criticized Chiang Kai-shek for his lack of democracy. This led to a deteriorating relationship between Chiang Kai-shek and the CC Clique, and follow the failure in the Chinese Civil War, their relationship completely broke down. Chiang blamed the defeat on Chen Lifu, famously exclaiming at a party reform meeting: "If you don't trust me to carry out the reforms, you can go and follow Chen Lifu!" As a result, Chen Lifu was forced into exile in Pennsylvania.

Subsequently, during the implementation of the Party Reform Program, Chen Cheng's Tsotanhui Clique gradually supplanted the CC Clique as the most influential faction within the Kuomintang. Chen Cheng emerged as Chiang Kai-shek's designated successor, holding concurrent posts as Vice President and Premier of ROC, as well as Vice President of the KMT.

The CC Clique aggressively criticized T.V. Soong following the Nationalist government's worsening economic crisis in January and early February 1947. As Soong's political role receded, the CC Clique increased its economic influence, particularly in the Agricultural Bank of China, for which Chen Guofu had become the chairman of the board in 1945. With Soong's influence decreased, CC Clique member Juo Jinghua aggressively developed commercial enterprises tied to the Clique.

To counter Chen Yi's actions in taking control of Taiwan, the CC Clique established a cooperative relationship with Chiang Wei-chuan, a social activist from the Japanese colonial period. Leveraging the grassroots influence of the former Taiwanese People's Party and anti-Chen Yi Kuomintang officials of Taiwanese origin, such as Lien Chen-tung and Hsieh Tung-min, the CC Clique helped organize the Taiwan People's Association (台灣民眾協會), which grew to tens of thousands of members.

Some viewpoints suggest that the CC Clique exhibited tendencies toward democratization and openness after relocating to Taiwan. Chi Shi-ying, who was Chen Lifu's secretary and later a key figure in the clique, once told Lei Chen that many CC Clique members supported the formation of an opposition party. He later co-founded the China Democracy Party.

In 1958, under Chi Shi-ying’s leadership, the CC Clique opposed amendments to the Publication Law that restricted freedom of speech. Led by legislator Cheng Tsang-po, Chi and 24 others submitted a motion on April 25, demanding a public review. This pressured the executive branch, and Vice Premier Huang Shao-ku admitted classifying the proposal as confidential was an oversight.

Despite this, the Kuomintang and Executive Yuan blocked the review through party mechanisms. In response, over 100 legislators co-signed an alternative amendment, but it was ultimately defeated.

Meanwhile, Liang Su-yung, regarded as the last leader of the CC Clique, served as the defense lawyer for Lei Chen.

=== Roles in intra-party Elections ===
During the late 1920s and 1930s, Chiang Kai Shek, the CC Clique and Zhu Jiahua all sought to maintain its organizational influence within the KMT amid growing centralization. Although Sun Yat-sen had established the principle of democratic centralism in 1924—requiring direct elections for party committees and congresses at all levels—Chiang replaced this system with a top-down appointment mechanism in 1928 to consolidate personal control. The coexistence of both systems during the 1930s created administrative ambiguity, which the CC Clique initially exploited to expand its grassroots networks under the pretext of “organizational guidance.” Direct elections were selectively permitted only in regions where the Clique or Chiang maintained strong local connections.

The situation shifted after 1938, when Chiang promoted the Proposal for Improving Party Affairs and Adjusting Party-Government Relations, which formally abolished direct elections in favor of a hierarchical appointment structure. This move curtailed the Clique’s influence over provincial and county-level branches. In response, CC Clique increasingly portrayed themselves as defenders of intra-party democracy, urging a return to electoral mechanisms as a counterbalance to Chiang’s growing reliance on Zhu Jiahua. For example, At the Fifth Central Executive Committee’s Eighth Plenary Session in March–April 1941, Huang Chi-lu, the CC-aligned chairman of the Sichuan Provincial Party Committee, openly criticized what he described as “excessive centralization,” arguing that the failure of party administration stemmed from the lack of democratic participation. When provincial committees appoint county-level officials, competent cadres are often overlooked; it would be far better to allow capable members at the grassroots to organize and elect their own committees. In his closing remarks to the session, Chiang Kai-shek acknowledged these concerns but maintained that the immediate priority lay in “the proper selection and utilization of talent,” emphasizing that government and party appointments should first draw from within the party before seeking candidates externally.

Yet the policy remained unstable. In September 1939, the Central Organization Department under Zhu Jiahua announced plans to “gradually reintroduce elections in selected areas,” but the initiative did not progress beyond that statement. When the Sichuan provincial branch inquired in May 1940 about resuming elections, it received a reply from the Central Organization Department that: the method of elections is still under study; a decision will be communicated later. In March 1941, the department officially declared the restoration of elections, but as of September 1942, only 43 out of 1,258 local party branches had actually conducted them—20 in Zhejiang, 2 in Yunnan, 1 in Guizhou, and 20 in Fujian. According to Wang Tzu-chuang, Chiang’s reliance on the appointment system was a deliberate strategy to empower Zhu Jiahua and counterbalance the influence of the CC Clique.

Between 1939 and 1942, the Clique repeatedly pressed for the restoration of local elections. In February 1941, Chen Guofu publicly favored the resumption of electoral procedures at a KMT organizational conference. On the eve of the 10th Plenary Session of the Fifth Central Executive Committee in November 1942, CC-affiliated members Hsiao Cheng and Cheng Tien-fong submitted a memorandum warning that the overcentralization of power in the Central Committee had undermined local initiative and hollowed out the party’s base. At the same meeting, Wang Ping-chün criticized Zhu’s Central Organization Department for its inconsistent personnel policies and called for the reestablishment of elections. Under mounting pressure from the CC Clique and criticism of bureaucratic stagnation, Chiang reluctantly authorized the reimplementation of local elections. By April 1944, elections had taken place in 517 of 1,357 counties nationwide.

The Clique continued to use electoral politics as an arena for factional competition. In November 1943, Chen Chao-ying, a CC member and chairman of the Fujian Provincial Party Committee, declined to seek re-election, intending to return to the central government. His protégé Li Hsiung (李雄), who was backed by Zhu Jiahua, was subsequently elected to succeed him. However, the party’s central authorities did not appoint Chen to a new post, leading him to refuse resignation. The CC Clique exploited the incident to sow distrust toward Zhu and aggravate factional tensions. It was not until April 1944 that Zhu overrode the results of the Jiangxi provincial election by appointing Chen as Jiangxi Provincial Chairman, allowing Li Hsiung to assume his Fujian post unopposed.

=== Role within the Wang Jingwei regime ===
According to Jin Xiongbai, editor-in-chief of the Zhongbao and a close associate of Zhou Fohai, Zhou was regarded within the Chiang Kai-shek's regime as one of the highest-ranking figures within the CC Clique and later head of CC Clique under Wang Jinwei Regime. Jin, in his memoir The Opening and Closing of the Wang Regime (汪政權的開場與收場), described Zhou as the leading organizer of the CC Clique’s Nanjing-based network following his entry into the regime alongside his subordinates. Zhou’s theoretical work, A Systematic Exposition of the Three Principles of the People (三民主義理論的體系), was considered by contemporaries to be among the most authoritative ideological texts produced by CC Clique intellectuals during this period.

Jin noted that members of the Nanjing government frequently expressed contempt toward officials originating from the earlier Reformed Government of the Republic of China, led by Liang Hongzhi, which was later incorporated into the Wang Jingwei regime. These officials were often portrayed by Nanjing officials as having voluntarily served as instruments of the enemy, in contrast to those who regarded themselves as ideological idealists. As a result, Zhou Fohai was reportedly pressed to exclude former Reformed Government officials from election to the regime’s Central Committee or from serving as party delegates within the Kuomintang. Zhou opposed this approach, arguing for inclusion. He maintained that "Since the new government openly aspired to operate under Japanese protection—using the metaphor of being sheltered under Japanese “parental wings”—it would be impracticable to pursue political cooperation while excluding former collaborators even at the formal level"; otherwise, he warned, no future arrangements could proceed.

Jin further described persistent factional rivalry between the CC Clique under Zhou Fohai and the so-called Mansion Clique, associated with figures such as Chen Bijun, Lin Bosheng, Chu Minyi, and Zhou Longxiang. These tensions became particularly evident during personnel negotiations on the eve of the regime’s return to Nanjing. Zhou reportedly sought to appoint Jin Xiongbai as Deputy Minister of Propaganda and concurrently as president of the Central News Agency, but encountered strong resistance from Lin Bosheng, who insisted on retaining Tang Liangli, a Japanese-backed candidate, as Vice Minister of Government Affairs. Lin reportedly remarked that "If all matters were indeed under Mr. Zhou’s authority, it was difficult to understand why he could not secure such an appointment."

Zhou’s diary entries from this period record his subsequent audience with Wang Jingwei and Chen Bijun, during which he discussed routine administrative matters while candidly warning that small-group politics would provoke internal fragmentation. He explicitly criticized what he described as Lin Baisheng’s factional exclusivism, presenting it as detrimental to regime cohesion. Jin interpreted these episodes as evidence of the intensity of factional struggle between the CC Clique and the Mansion Clique within the Wang Jingwei regime.

Although the regime’s formal hierarchy placed Chen Gongbo above Zhou Fohai, Jin asserted that Zhou exercised greater de facto authority. Diplomatic, financial, fiscal, military, and intelligence affairs were described as converging around Zhou’s office, even as Wang Jingwei, Chen Gongbo, and Zhou Fohai reportedly maintained close personal relations.

Jin further observed that Zhou was consistently regarded by the Mansion Clique as the de facto leader of the CC Clique. Zhou maintained close personal ties with figures such as Mei Siping (later attempt to form his own clique and broke up with Zhou) and Cen Deguang, and relied on trusted associates including Luo Junqiang and his brother-in-law Yang Xinghua. Intelligence officials Ding Mocun and Li Shiqun, both affiliated with the Central Bureau of Investigation and Statistics, were likewise widely perceived as operating within Zhou’s political orbit. Jin described recurrent tensions within this network, including rivalry between Ding and Li over the post of Minister of Police Administration. Although Ding possessed greater seniority, Li enjoyed closer relations with Japanese intelligence figure Kenji Doihara. Zhou initially favored Ding, appointing him Minister of Social Affairs while retaining the police portfolio himself. Relations between Zhou and Ding subsequently deteriorated, while Li abruptly declared loyalty to Zhou and was thereafter recommended by him for appointment as Minister of Police Administration and Governor of Jiangsu Province. Jin later claimed that Li’s eventual death by poisoning at Japanese hands was connected to Zhou, a view presented as Jin’s personal assessment rather than an established historical conclusion.

Jin also recorded that between September and October 1939, Luo Junqiang compiled a list of individuals closely associated with Zhou Fohai and proposed that ten of them be formally bonded as sworn brothers in an attempt to consolidate political support. According to Jin, this arrangement was intended—following the formal establishment of the Wang Jingwei regime—to position these individuals as vice ministers across ten government ministries as part of a coordinated power-sharing design. Jin emphasized, however, that this plan ultimately remained an unrealized attempt rather than an accomplished institutional arrangement. The final selection of the proposed individuals was nevertheless personally approved by Zhou Fohai.

The ten individuals listed in this proposed arrangement were:

- Yi Ciqian (易次乾), later Director of the Issuance Bureau of the Central Reserve Bank; died of illness.
- Geng Jiaji (耿嘉基), who died by suicide in 1944.
- Luo Junqiang (羅君強).
- Wang Manyun (汪曼雲), Vice Minister of the Social Affairs Department of the Central Party Headquarters; died in prison in 1972.
- Cai Hongtian (蔡洪田), who served as Chairman of the Shanghai Municipal Party Headquarters in 1939, later as Director of the Social Welfare Special Committee, Director of the Jiangsu Provincial Department of Civil Affairs, member of the provincial government, Director of the Shanghai Prison Administration Bureau, and from 1942 as Vice Chairman of the Legal Affairs Special Committee.
- Zhang Zhengfan (章正範), member of the Zhejiang Provincial Government.
- Zhou Leshan (周樂山), Commissioner of the Mingguang District, Anhui Province.
- Zhang Zhonghuan (張仲寰), Director of the Jiangsu Provincial Department of Education.
- Jin Xiongbo (金雄白).
- Dai Ce (戴策), Deputy Secretary-General of the Kuomintang Central Party Headquarters and Director of the Overseas Chinese Affairs Bureau.

== Ideology ==
Considered the leading right-wing faction of the Kuomintang alongside the Blue Shirts Society, the CC Clique represented traditionalists, anti-communists, constitutionalists, free-market liberals, and land reformers. They stood closest to Generalissimo Chiang Kai-shek, influencing appointments and promotions, and held the largest block of votes in the Central Executive Committee. Chen Lifu was considered the party head. Its members included many of the elite within the party, including such people as Chiang Kai-shek's wife Soong Mei-ling and H.H. Kung. They influenced intelligence, trade, banking, the military, education, and propaganda.

Despite being an ultra-anti-communist faction within the Kuomintang, the CC Clique was the most radical proponent of land reform within the party. Under the leadership of Chen Guofu, the CC Clique played a key role in incorporating land reform laws into the constitution, which later evolved into Articles 142, 143, and 146 of the Constitution of the Republic of China.

In 1948, CC member Hsiao Cheng proposed the Agricultural Land Reform Bill in the Legislative Yuan, advocating for farmland to be transferred to farmers. His proposal was one of the earliest legislative efforts in Taiwan's post-war land reform process.

== Name ==
Chen Lifu denied the existence of the "CC Clique" in his memoir, stating he would not name his faction in English. Members of the group refer to themselves as the 'Ko-hsin Clique.

== Notable members ==
Wang Tseng-shan, a Chinese Muslim, was the KMT commissioner of Civil Affairs in the Xinjiang Coalition Government from 1946–47, and was associated with the CC Clique. The Uyghur Masud Sabri was also a CC Clique member, as was the Tatar Burhan Shahidi and the KMT-general and Han Chinese Wu Zhongxin.

== See also ==
- Reorganization Group
- Tsotanhui Clique

== Literature ==
- Wakeman, Frederic E. (2003). "Ideological Rivalries: The Blue Shirts and the "CC" Clique". In Wakeman, Frederic (ed.). Spymaster: Dai Li and the Chinese Secret Service. Berkeley (CA): University of California Press. pp. 98–109. doi:10.1525/california/9780520234079.003.0009. ISBN 9780520234079.
