= Sung Ying =

Chinese-born politician (1902–2001)

Sung Ying (Chinese: 宋英; 1902–2001) was a Chinese-born politician.

A native of Shucheng County, Anhui, Sung was married to Lei Chen. Their children include Lei Mei-lin, Lei Te-ning, and Lei Te-chuan. Sung's husband was imprisoned from 1960 to 1970, and died in 1979. After his death, she was named to the Control Yuan. From this position, Sung repeatedly called for another investigation into Lei Chen's death.
