= Lo Ta-yu (intelligence officer) =

Chinese intelligence officer (1910–1973)

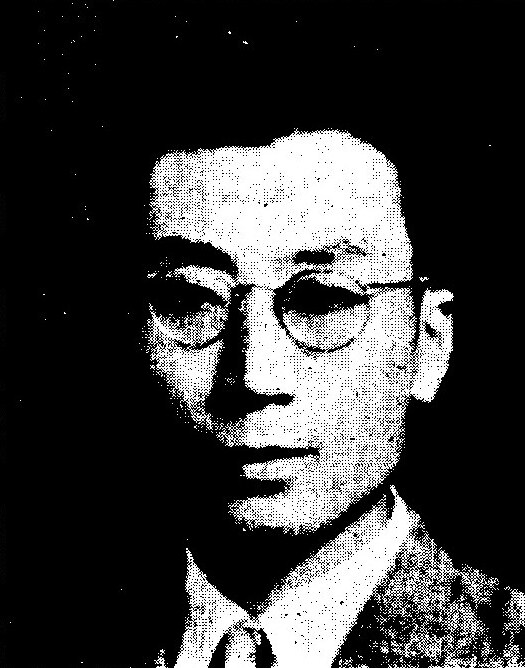
Lo Ta-yu

Lo Ta-yu（Chinese: 羅大愚; pinyin: Luó Dàyú; December 6, 1910 – May 10, 1973), courtesy name 泽南, was a Chinese intelligence officer and politician. In 1935, he was recruited as an underground operative by the intelligence networks of the Northeast Association and the September 18th Alliance, both led by Chi Shi-ying. That same year, together with 賈桂林, 鄭輔國, and 趙喜貴, he acquired Manchukuo nationality and entered the graduate division of economics at Tokyo University of Law and Politics, where he actively expanded the network among Chinese students in Japan, including Liang Su-yung. In 1938, 羅 was recalled to Chongqing by Chi Shi-ying, who after providing specialized training, authorized him to direct underground operations in Manchuria. Returning there, he continued clandestine activities until his arrest by the Japanese military in 1945. After the war, he was elected in Liaoning as a member of the First Legislative Yuan.

Luo used Wei Zhongcheng as an alias.
