= International PEN centres =

PEN centres are the federated members of PEN International.

== List ==
According to the website of PEN International.

=== Africa ===
- Afar Centre
- Afrikaans Centre
- Algerian Centre
- Egyptian Centre
- Eritrean Centre in Exile
- Ethiopian Centre
- Gambia Centre
- Ghanaian Centre
- Guinea-Bisseau Centre
- Guinean Centre
- Ivory Coast Centre
- Kenyan Centre
- Liberian Centre
- Malawian Centre
- Mali Centre
- Mauritania Centre
- Moroccan Centre
- Nigerian Centre
- Senegal Centre
- Sierra Leone Centre
- Somali-Speaking Centre
- South African Centre
- Togo Centre
- Tunisian Centre
- Ugandan Centre
- Zambian Centre
- Zimbabwe Centre

=== Asia Pacific ===
- Afghan Centre
- All-India PEN Centre Theosophy Hall, Bombay
- Bangladesh Centre
- Cambodian Centre
- Central Asia PEN
- Chinese Center
- Guangzhou Chinese Centre
- Hong Kong (Chinese Speaking) Centre
- Hong Kong (English Speaking) Centre
- Independent Chinese Centre
- Japanese Centre
- Kazakhstan Centre
- Korean Centre
- Melbourne Centre
- Mongolian Centre
- Myanmar Centre
- Nepalese Centre
- New Zealand Centre: New Zealand Society of Authors (PEN New Zealand)
- North Korean Writers in Exile Centre
- PEN Delhi Centre
- Perth Centre
- Philippine Centre: Philippine Center of International PEN
- Shanghai Centre
- Sydney Centre: Sydney PEN
- Uyghur Centre
- Taipei Chinese Center
- Tatar Centre
- Thai Centre
- Tibetan Writers Abroad Centre

=== Europe ===
- Armãn Centre
- Albanian Centre
- Armenian Centre
- Austrian Centre
- Basque Centre
- Belarusian Centre: forcibly dissolved by the Supreme Court of Belarus on 9 August 2021.
- Belgian (Dutch Speaking) Centre
- Belgian (French-speaking) Centre
- Bosnian Centre: PEN Bosnia and Herzegovina
- Bulgarian Centre
- Catalan Centre
- Centre de la Langue d'Oc
- Centre of German-Speaking Writers Abroad
- Chechen Writers Centre
- Croatian Centre
- Cypriot Centre: Cypriot PEN
- Czech Centre
- Danish Centre
- English Centre: English PEN
- Esperanto Centre
- Estonian Centre
- Finnish Centre
- French Centre
- Galician Centre
- Georgian Centre
- German Centre: PEN Centre Germany
- Hungarian Centre: Hungarian PEN
- Icelandic Centre
- Iranian PEN Centre in Exile
- Irish Centre
- Italian Centre
- Kosovan Centre
- Kurdish Centre: Kurdish PEN
- Latvian Centre
- Liechtenstein Centre
- Lithuanian Centre
- Low German and Frisian Center
- Macedonian Centre
- Moldovan Centre
- Monegasque Centre
- Montenegrin Centre
- Netherlands Centre
- Norwegian Centre
- Polish Centre
- Portuguese Centre
- Roma Centre
- Romanian Centre
- Russian Centre
- Sardinian Centre
- Scottish Centre
- Serbian Centre
- Slovak Centre
- Slovene Centre
- Spanish Centre
- St Petersburg Centre
- Swedish Centre
- Suisse Romand Centre
- Swiss German Centre
- Swiss Italian and Reto-Romansh Centre
- Turkey Centre
- Trieste Centre
- Ukrainian Centre: PEN Ukraine
- Writers from former Yugoslavia Centre
- Writers in Exile, German Centre
- Writers in Exile, London Centre

=== Latin America and The Caribbean ===
- Argentinian Centre
- Bolivian Centre
- Brazilian Centre
- Chilean Centre
- Colombian Centre
- Guadalajaran Centre
- Guatemalan Centre
- Haiti Centre
- Honduras Centre
- Jamaican Centre
- Mexican Centre
- Nicaraguan Centre
- Panamanian Centre
- Paraguayan Centre
- Peruvian Centre
- Puerto Rican Centre
- San Miguel de Allende Centre
- Uruguayan Centre
- Venezuelan Centre

=== Middle East ===
- Bahrain Centre
- Iraq Centre
- Israeli Centre (was active from 1930 until 2024)
- Jordanian Centre
- Lebanese Centre
- Palestinian Centre

=== North America ===
- American Centre: PEN America
- Canadian Centre: PEN Canada
- Chinese Writers Abroad Centre
- Cuban Writers in Exile Centre
- Quebecois Centre
- Vietnamese Abroad Centre
