= Chen Guofu =

Chinese politician (1892–1951)

- 陳果夫
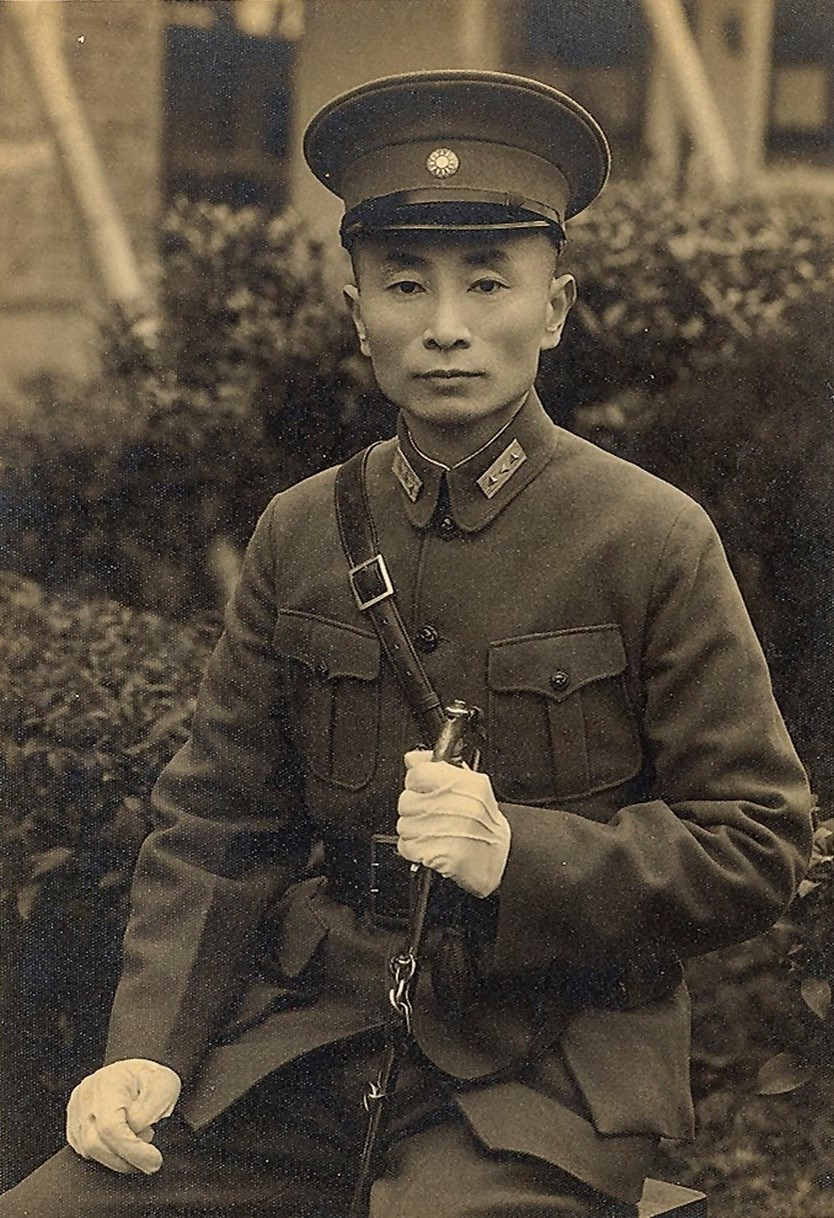
- Chen c. 1930s or early 1940s

Governor of Jiangsu
- In office October 1933 – November 1937
- Preceded by: Gu Zhutong
- Succeeded by: Gu Zhutong

Personal details
- Born: 27 October 1892 Wucheng County, Zhejiang, Qing China (present-day Wuxing District, Huzhou)
- Died: 25 August 1951 (aged 58) Taipei, Taiwan
- Party: Kuomintang
- Relatives: Chen Qiye (father); Chen Qimei (uncle); Chen Qicai (uncle); Chen Lifu (brother); Chen Tsu-li (half brother)

Chen Guofu (traditional Chinese: 陳果夫; simplified Chinese: 陈果夫; pinyin: Chén Guǒfū; Wade–Giles: Ch'en^{2} Kuo^{3}-fu^{1}; 27 October 1892 – 25 August 1951) was a Chinese politician and revolutionary in the Republic of China. His given name was Zudao (traditional Chinese: 祖燾; simplified Chinese: 祖焘; pinyin: Zǔdào), though he was more widely known as Guofu. With his brother Chen Lifu, he led the CC Clique of the Kuomintang. Compared to his brother, Chen Guofu was considered to have more influence within the Kuomintang.

== Biography ==
Chen was born in modern Wuxing, Huzhou Zhejiang in 1892. His father Chen Qiye and uncles Chen Lifu and Chen Qicai were all anti-Qing revolutionaries and later Kuomintang members. Chen joined the Tongmenghui in 1911. He participated in both the 1911 Revolution against the Qing dynasty and the Second Revolution against Yuan Shikai. He restarted his political career in 1924, being nominated as member of the Kuomintang Central Audit, as well as head of the Department of Organization and president of the Central Financial Committee. Together with his younger brother Chen Lifu, he organized the CC Clique or Central Club Clique of the Kuomintang. He was chairman of the government of Jiangsu from 1933 to 1937. During the Second Sino-Japanese War, Chen was among those who suggested opening the dikes of the Yellow River to halt the Japanese advance, resulting in the 1938 Yellow River flood.

Chen was the director of China Central Broadcasting.

Chen had become ill with tuberculosis during the 1911 Revolution and had been frequently hospitalized with hemoptysis throughout his life. He left for Taiwan in December 1948 and settled in Taichung, before moving to Taipei in January 1951 to seek better treatment for his lung disease. He died in Taipei on 25 August 1951 and was buried at Mount Guanyin on 4 November.

Chen, a longtime patron of the Korean independence movement in China, was posthumously awarded the Order of Merit for National Foundation in 1966.
