= Edwin Liu =

- 劉文雄
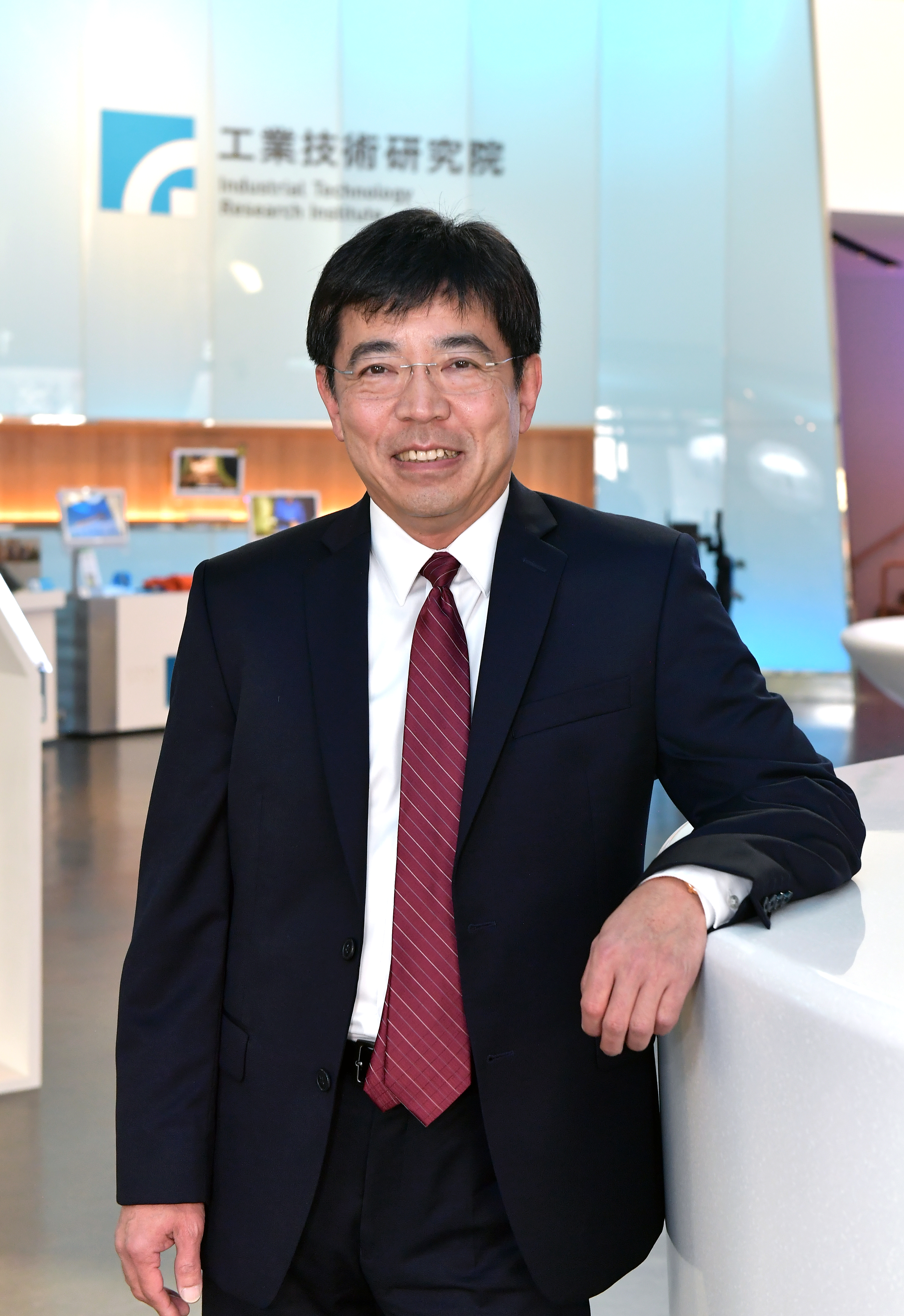
- Education: National Taiwan University (BS); University of California, Berkeley (MS, PhD)
- Occupation: President of Industrial Technology Research Institute (ITRI)

Edwin Liu (Chinese: 劉文雄) is a Taiwanese businessman who is the current president of Industrial Technology Research Institute (ITRI). He was previously the senior vice president of Smart Grid & Grid Management at Nexant, Inc. He also held various technical and management positions at Quanta Technology, Bechtel, PG&E, Siemens, and Control Data Corporation (CDC). Edwin Liu is an IEEE Fellow and once served as chairman of its Computer and Analytical Methods Subcommittee.

== Education ==
Liu graduated from National Taiwan University with a bachelor's degree in electrical engineering, then completed doctoral studies in the United States, where he earned his Ph.D. from the University of California, Berkeley, in electrical engineering and information engineering.

== Career ==
From 1987 to 1991, he worked as a Senior Engineer at Siemens and Control Data Corporation in the United States. He then served as a Supervisor at Pacific Gas and Electric Company from 1991 to 1997, followed by a role as Senior Manager at Bechtel R&D from 1997 to 2000. From 2000 to 2008, he held the positions of Vice President and later Senior Vice President at Nexant, and subsequently served as Vice President at Quanta Technology from 2008 to 2014. He returned to Nexant as Senior Vice President from 2014 to 2018. In April 2018, he was appointed President of Taiwan's Industrial Technology Research Institute (ITRI), a position he continues to hold. Since June 2020, he has also served as Chairman of the Industrial Technology Investment Corporation in Taiwan.

== Expertise ==
Edwin Liu's expertise is on smart grid, information integration, power system optimization, electricity market modeling, energy and emission management, automation, and technology innovation. Besides being an energy domain expert, he has practical experience in big data analytics and artificial intelligence research as well as application development, along with a strong background in startups, R&D, and business strategy.

== Honors & recognition ==
- Fellow of the IEEE for contributions to the development of state estimation and optimal power flows, and their integration in utility systems (Awarded 2001)
- Outstanding Performance Awards for excellent innovations, Quanta Technology, USA (2010)
- Outstanding Awards for chairmanship of the IEEE Computing and Analytical Methods (2009)
- Outstanding Service Awards for planning, organizing, and management of the first IEEE PES Power System Conference and Exhibition, IEEE (2005)
- Technical Excellence and Contribution Awards for contributions to advanced optimization analytics and implementation on commercial products, Siemens‐Empros International (1990)
- Outstanding Awards for excellent R&D project, Pacific Gas and Electric Company, USA (1996)
- Small Business Innovation Research (SBIR) Award by National Science Foundation, USA (1993)
