= The Taipei Chinese PEN =

- Cover of the Winter 2021 issue
- Categories: Taiwanese literature
- Publisher: Taipei Chinese P.E.N. Center
- Founder: Nancy Ing
- Founded: 1972
- Country: Taiwan
- Language: English
- Website: The Taipei Chinese PEN
- ISSN: 2077-0448

The Taipei Chinese PEN: A Quarterly Journal of Contemporary Chinese Literature from Taiwan (當代台灣文學英譯 or 當代台灣文學選譯), known as The Chinese PEN before 2007, is a quarterly English-language literary magazine on contemporary Taiwanese literature. The journal was founded by Nancy Ing in 1972, and published by the Taipei Chinese P.E.N. Center (Chinese P.E.N. Center from 1924 to 1975), one of the PEN International centers.

The magazine is supported by Taiwan's Ministry of Culture, Ministry of Foreign Affairs, the National Museum of Taiwan Literature, and Hao Ran Foundation. Additionally, subscription fees (largely from PEN International members and western universities) cover the magazine's production costs.
