= Free China Journal =

Chinese magazine in Taiwan

Free China Journal 自由中國半月刊
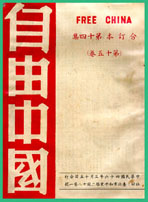
- Free China Journal cover
- Publisher: Hu Shih
- Founder: Lei Chen
- First issue: 20 December 1949
- Final issue: 1 September 1960
- Country: Republic of China
- Language: Chinese

Free China Journal
- Traditional Chinese: 自由中國半月刊
- Hanyu Pinyin: Zìyóu Zhōnggúo Bànyùekān

Free China Journal (Chinese: 自由中國半月刊) was a periodical sponsored by the Kuomintang that was published in Taiwan after the Kuomintang retreat following their defeat in the Chinese Civil War.

The first issue appeared on 20 December 1949. The publisher was Hu Shih while the director and founder was Lei Chen, a member of the Kuomintang who was also close to Chiang Kai-shek. The publication was sponsored by the Kuomintang-led government to act as a forum for free thought and discussion against the People's Republic of China. Its popularity soared as the editors and writers analyzed political situations at the time, sometimes even advising or criticizing the government in earnest.

The publication ceased in 1960 when the government forced a shut-down after Lei criticized Chiang Kai-shek for changing the constitution in order to allow him to run as President beyond the two terms previously mandated and sought to form a coalition opposition party with influential native Taiwanese politicians. Lei was also accused of promoting the formation of a "Democratic State of Chinese Taiwan" (中華臺灣民主國) to counter the People's Republic of China. The final issue was published on September 1, 1960.

== See also ==
- Propaganda in the Republic of China
