= Zhongshan High School of Northeast =

School in Liaoning, China

Coordinates: 41.790324°N 123.409718°E

- Chinese: 东北中山中学
- Traditional Chinese: 東北中山中學
- Simplified Chinese: 东北中山中学
Transcriptions
Standard Mandarin
- Hanyu Pinyin: Dōngběi Zhōngshān Zhōngxué

Zhongshan High School of Northeast

Zhongshan High School of Northeast (东北中山中学) (Nezs) is a secondary school located in Heping District, Shenyang, Liaoning, China. It was the first national high school in the Republic of China. It was found by nationalist politician Chi Shi-ying. Its original name was National Northeast Zhongshan High School (國立東北中山中學). Nezs is the only middle school to join the December 9th Movement.

It was established in Peiking in 1934. The first headmaster was Li Xi'en, who became Jilin University's headmaster. In the autumn of 1936, Nezs moved to Banqiao, Nanjing because of the Second Sino-Japanese War. After the war, in 1946, Nezs moved to Shenyang, Liaoning, and changed its name to Shenyang No.39 middle school. In 1996, Nezs rehabilitated the name Zhongshan High School of Northeast. In 1998, Nezs became Shenyang Middle School (沈阳市重点中学). In 1999, it became Liaoning School (辽宁省重点中学).
