= Chen Lifu =

Chinese politician

- 陳立夫
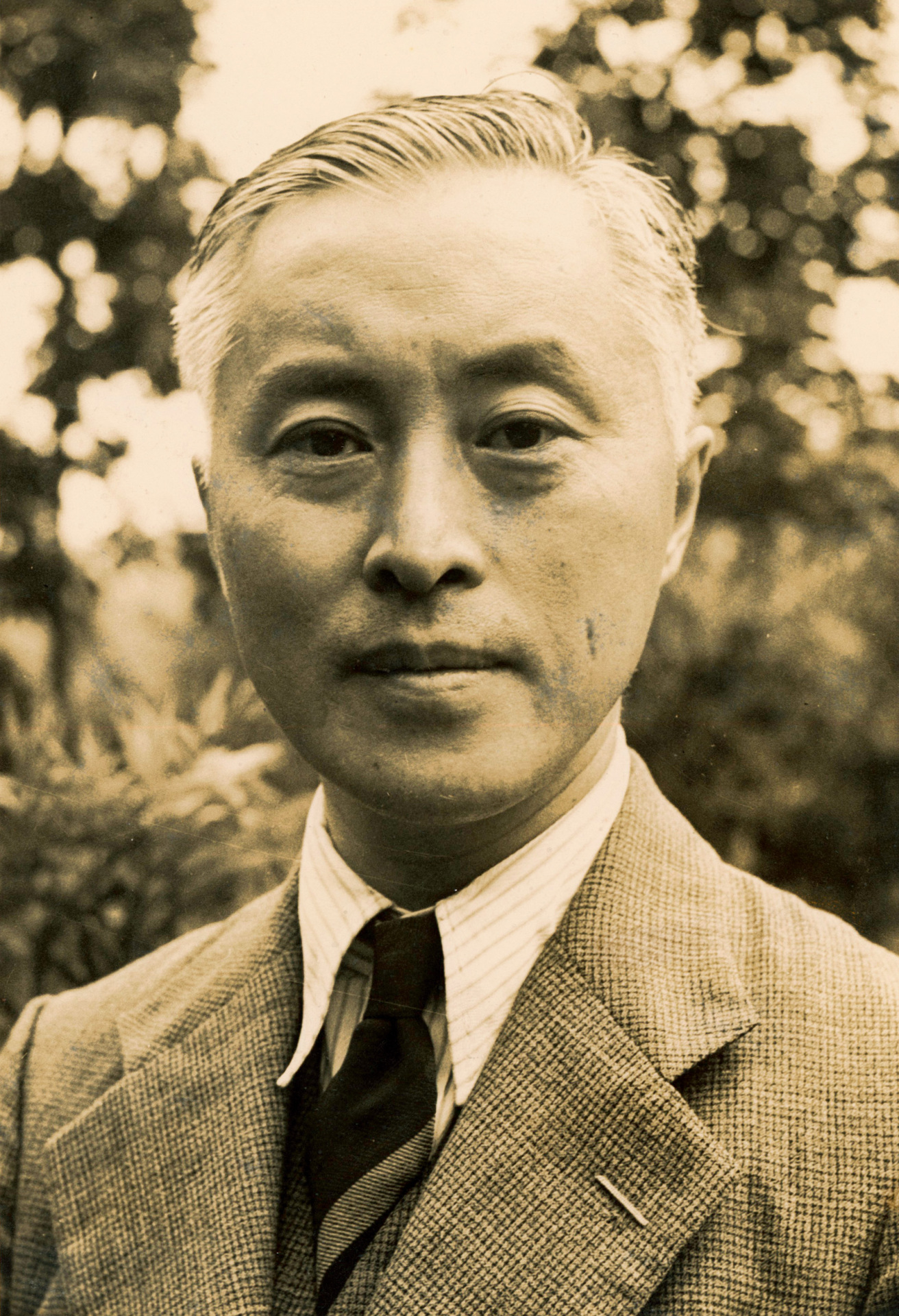

Minister of Education of the Republic of China
- In office January 1938 – December 1944
- Preceded by: Wang Shijie
- Succeeded by: Zhu Jiahua

Personal details
- Born: 21 August 1900 Wucheng County, Zhejiang, Qing China (present-day Wuxing, Huzhou)
- Died: 8 February 2001 (aged 100) Taichung, Taiwan
- Party: Kuomintang
- Spouse: Sun Lu-ching
- Children: 4
- Relatives: Chen Qiye (father); Chen Qimei (uncle); Chen Qicai (uncle); Chen Guofu (brother); Chen Tsu-li (half brother)
- Education: Beiyang University (BS); University of Pittsburgh (MS)

Chen Lifu (traditional Chinese: 陳立夫; simplified Chinese: 陈立夫; pinyin: Chén lì-fū; Wade–Giles: Ch'en^{2} Li^{4}-fu^{1}; 21 August 1900 – 8 February 2001) was a Chinese politician in the Republic of China. He was a close advisor of Chiang Kai-shek. With his brother Chen Guofu, he led the CC Clique within the Kuomintang.

== Life and career ==
Chen was born in modern Wuxing District, Huzhou, Zhejiang in 1900. His father, Chen Qiye and his uncles, Chen Qimei and Chen Qicai were all anti-Qing revolutionaries and later Kuomintang members. In 1925, he formally joined the Kuomintang (KMT) in San Francisco after receiving his master's degree in mining engineering from the University of Pittsburgh. On 9 January 1926, Chiang Kai-shek hired Chen as his confidential secretary. In 1927, Chiang appointed Chen to head the Investigation Section of the Organization Department of the KMT Chen and elder brother Chen Guofu became heads of the KMT's secret service, leading a political faction known as the CC Clique.

Regarding the KMT's modernization policy, Chen stated in 1930 that "from this point forward, psychological reconstruction will be fundamentally attached to government reconstruction as its main program ... a revolutionary mentality must conform to the needs of a revolutionary government."

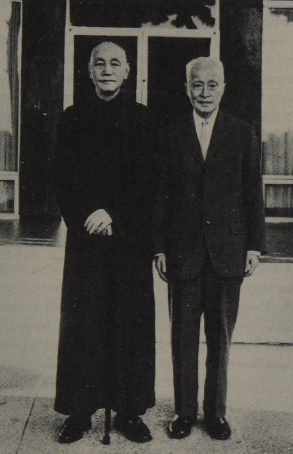
Chen Lifu and Chiang Kai-shek in 1970 at Chiang's summer residence at Sun Moon Lake, Taiwan.

In late 1935, China faced the looming threat of war with Japan, and Chiang decided to send Chen to the Soviet Union to negotiate a treaty of mutual military assistance. However, Chen flew to Berlin in disguise, and while preparing to go on to Moscow, preliminary negotiations broke down and he was recalled. In the fall of 1936, Chen was Chiang's representative at a series of secret meetings with Chinese Communist Party representative Pan Hannian, where the two sides attempted to negotiate a united front against the Japanese. This attempt failed, leading to the Xi'an Incident.

In 1938, Chen was again promoted, becoming the minister of education. Chen held this position until 1944. After the end of the Second Sino-Japanese War, he became vice president of the Legislative Yuan.

Chen went to the United States to support Thomas E. Dewey's campaign in the 1948 United States presidential election, a move that earned the Kuomintang the ire of Harry S. Truman. With the Kuomintang defeat in the Chinese Civil War, Chen went to Taiwan.

Under pressure from Chen Cheng after the falling out of relations between him and Chiang Kai-shek, he resigned from politics and moved to the United States. His brother, Chen Guofu, remained in Taiwan until his death in 1952.

In America, Chen ran a newspaper for the Chinese-American community in New York City. Additionally, Chen ran a chicken farm in New Jersey in order to make a living during his time in exile. He returned to Taiwan in 1961 to visit his father, Chen Qiye, before he died. In his memoir, Chen also stated that he was received by Chen Cheng at the airport alongside a thousand people and met with Chiang at his father's house. He did not permanently return to Taiwan until 1968, 3 years after Chen Cheng's death.

In 1993, Chen published a memoir titled The Storm Clouds Clear Over China which documented his role in Chinese politics and the Chinese Civil War. In his memoir, Chen denied the existence of the CC Clique and refused to provide an English name for the movement.

In Taiwan, Chen served as the vice chairman of the Chinese Cultural Renaissance committee, the chairman of the Confucius-Mencius Society, and the chairman of the China Medical University. He died in Taichung on 8 February 2001 at the age of 100.

== Bibliography ==
- Ch'en, Li-fu (1994). The storm clouds clear over China, the memoir of Ch'en Li-fu, 1900-1993. Stanford, California: Hoover Press.
- Sheng, Michael (1992). "Mao, Stalin, and the Formation of the Anti-Japanese United Front: 1935-1937". The China Quarterly (129): 149–170.
- van de Ven, Hans (2003). War and Nationalism. New York: Routledge.
- Yang, Kuisong (2020). "Sino-Soviet Diplomacy Under the Threat of War". In Shen, Zhihua (ed.). A Short History of Sino-Soviet Relations, 1917–1991. Translated by Xia, Yafeng. Singapore: Palmgrave Macmillan and Social Sciences Academic Press.
