= Liu Wen-hsiung (1941–1990) =

Taiwanese politician

- 劉文雄

Member of the Legislative Yuan
- In office 1 February 1990 – October 1990
- Constituency: Taichung

Personal details
- Born: 1941 Jirin, Hokuto, Taichū Prefecture, Taiwan, Empire of Japan (today Erlin, Changhua, Taiwan)
- Died: October 1990 (aged 48–49) Taipei, Taiwan
- Party: Democratic Progressive Party

Liu Wen-hsiung (Chinese: 劉文雄; 1941–1990) was a Taiwanese politician.

He was elected to the Legislative Yuan in 1989. After discussing national sovereignty with legislative speaker Liang Su-yung in October 1990, Liu suffered a heart attack and died in the legislature. His funeral was held in Taichung on 3 November 1990.
