= Henry Kao =

Taiwanese politician (1913–2005)

Henry Kao Kao Yu-shu
- 高玉樹
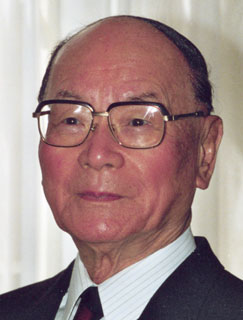
- Kao in 2000

Minister of Transportation and Communications
- In office 1 June 1972 – 11 June 1976
- Preceded by: Chang Chi-cheng
- Succeeded by: Lin Chin-sheng

1st Mayor of Taipei
- In office 2 June 1964 – 10 June 1972
- Preceded by: Huang Chi-jui
- Succeeded by: Chang Feng-hsu
- In office 2 June 1954 – 2 June 1957
- Preceded by: Wu San-lien
- Succeeded by: Huang Chi-jui

Personal details
- Born: 3 September 1913 Taihoku Prefecture, Taiwan, Empire of Japan
- Died: 15 June 2005 (aged 91) Taipei, Taiwan
- Party: China Democratic Socialist Party; Kuomintang
- Education: Waseda University (BEng)
- Profession: Engineer

Henry Kao or Kao Yu-shu (Chinese: 高玉樹; pinyin: Gāo Yùshù; 3 September 1913 – 15 June 2005) was a Taiwanese politician. He served as Mayor of Taipei from 1954 to 1957 and again between 1964 and 1972, when he was named Minister of Transportation and Communications. Kao remained a public servant for the rest of his life, as minister without portfolio until 1989, then presidential adviser until his death.

== Education ==
Kao studied engineering at Waseda University in Japan. In 1999, he was the 55th person and first Taiwanese to receive an honorary doctorate from Waseda University.

== Political career ==
Kao won his first term as mayor of Taipei in 1954, with the support of the China Democratic Socialist Party. He ran again in 1957 and lost due to suspected voter fraud. Kao ended his 1960 bid for the Taipei mayoralty when the Kuomintang barred him from asking citizens to watch the polling areas in an attempt to combat electoral fraud. In 1963, the government agreed to hold fairer elections and allowed Kao to run. Though KMT candidate Chou Pai-lien was expected to win, Kao repeatedly challenged Chou to debates that Chou continually ignored. Due to the disagreement about debate attendance, Kao managed to win an upset victory. Because the Kuomintang also lost the mayoralties of Tainan and Keelung in 1963, Chiang Kai-shek made Taipei a special municipality in 1967. As a result, Taipei City Government officials were appointed by, and reported directly to, the Executive Yuan. Chiang kept Kao in his post as mayor until 1972 to avoid the ire of Taiwanese citizens. Kao later agreed to join the Kuomintang and was appointed Minister of Transportation and Communications. He was named minister without portfolio in 1976 and presidential adviser in 1989. Upon ending his independent candidacy for president in January 1996, Kao returned to an advisory role and served until his death in 2005.
