= Lei Chen =

Chinese activist (1897–1979)

- Born: 8 July 1897; Changxing County, Zhejiang, China
- Died: 7 March 1979 (aged 81); Beitou District, Taipei, Taiwan
- Education: Kyoto University (LLB, LLM)

Lei Chen (Chinese: 雷震; pinyin: Léi Zhèn; 8 July 1897 – 7 March 1979) was a Chinese politician and dissident who was the early leading figure in the movement to bring fuller democracy to the government of the Republic of China.

Born in Zhejiang in 1897, Lei was educated at Kyoto Imperial University in imperial Japan. His early political career included posts as the secretary-general of the National Political Assembly and Constituent National Assembly. He also served on the Control Yuan, as minister without portfolio, and presidential adviser.

Lei Chen helped found and produce the periodical Free China, published beginning in 1950. Lei was expelled from the Kuomintang in 1954. Six years later, he founded the China Democracy Party with Hsu Shih-hsien and Huang Hua, among others. Shortly thereafter, Lei was charged with sedition and jailed. The charges are widely regarded as having been falsified by the Taiwan government and its then-ruling party the Kuomintang in response to Lei Chen's criticisms.

He was released in 1970 and died on 7 March 1979, aged 82. He was married to Sung Ying, who had also served on the Control Yuan . Lei was posthumously exonerated by the Transitional Justice Commission in May 2019.

== See also ==
- Democracy in China during the Republic of China
- White Terror (Taiwan)
