= List of political office-holders of the Republic of China by age =

In this list of political office-holders of the Republic of China (post-1947 Constitution) by age, for each office, the table charts the age of each officeholder at the time of taking office (the first time taking office if elected or appointed to multiple and consecutive terms), upon leaving office, and at the time of death.

== President of the Republic of China ==
#	President	Born	Age at start of presidency	Age at end of presidency	Post-presidency timespan	Lifespan	
#	President	Born	Age at start of presidency	Age at end of presidency	Post-presidency timespan	Died	Age
1	Chiang Kai-shek	Oct 31, 1887	60 years, 202 days May 20, 1948	87 years, 156 days Apr 5, 1975	(died in office)	Apr 5, 1975	87 years, 156 days
2	Yen Chia-kan	Oct 23, 1905	69 years, 165 days Apr 6, 1975	72 years, 209 days May 20, 1978	15 years, 218 days	Dec 24, 1993	88 years, 62 days
3	Chiang Ching-kuo	Apr 27, 1910	68 years, 23 days May 20, 1978	77 years, 261 days Jan 13, 1988	(died in office)	Jan 13, 1988	77 years, 261 days
4	Lee Teng-hui	Jan 15, 1923	64 years, 363 days Jan 13, 1988	77 years, 126 days May 20, 2000	20 years, 71 days	Jul 30, 2020	97 years, 197 days
5	Chen Shui-bian	Oct 12, 1950	49 years, 221 days May 20, 2000	57 years, 221 days May 20, 2008	17 years, 250 days	(living)	75 years, 105 days
6	Ma Ying-jeou	Jul 13, 1950	57 years, 312 days May 20, 2008	65 years, 312 days May 20, 2016	9 years, 250 days	(living)	75 years, 196 days
7	Tsai Ing-wen	Aug 31, 1956	59 years, 263 days May 20, 2016	67 years, 263 days May 20, 2024	1 year, 250 days	(living)	69 years, 147 days
8	William Lai	Oct 6, 1959	64 years, 227 days May 20, 2024	(incumbent)	(incumbent)	(living)	66 years, 111 days

=== Graphical representation ===
This is a graphical lifespan timeline of the presidents of the Republic of China (post-1947 Constitution) and they are listed in order of office.

The following chart shows presidents by their age (living presidents in green), with the years of their presidency in blue.

== Vice President of the Republic of China ==
#	Vice President	Born	Age at start of vice presidency	Age at end of vice presidency	Post-vice presidency timespan	Lifespan	
#	Vice President	Born	Age at start of vice presidency	Age at end of vice presidency	Post-vice presidency timespan	Died	Age
1	Li Zongren	Aug 13, 1890	57 years, 281 days May 20, 1948	63 years, 209 days Mar 10, 1954	14 years, 326 days	Jan 30, 1969	78 years, 170 days
2	Chen Cheng	Jan 4, 1898	56 years, 136 days May 20, 1954	67 years, 60 days Mar 5, 1965	0 days	Mar 5, 1965	67 years, 60 days
3	Yen Chia-kan	Oct 23, 1905	60 years, 209 days May 20, 1966	69 years, 164 days Apr 5, 1975	18 years, 263 days	Dec 24, 1993	88 years, 62 days
4	Hsieh Tung-min	Jan 25, 1908	70 years, 115 days May 20, 1978	76 years, 116 days May 20, 1984	16 years, 324 days	Apr 9, 2001	93 years, 74 days
5	Lee Teng-hui	Jan 15, 1923	61 years, 126 days May 20, 1984	64 years, 363 days Jan 13, 1988	32 years, 199 days	Jul 30, 2020	97 years, 197 days
6	Lee Yuan-tsu	Sep 24, 1923	66 years, 238 days May 20, 1990	72 years, 239 days May 20, 1996	20 years, 292 days	Mar 8, 2017	93 years, 165 days
7	Lien Chan	Aug 27, 1936	59 years, 267 days May 20, 1996	63 years, 267 days May 20, 2000	25 years, 250 days	(living)	89 years, 151 days
8	Annette Lu	Jun 7, 1944	55 years, 348 days May 20, 2000	63 years, 348 days May 20, 2008	17 years, 250 days	(living)	81 years, 232 days
9	Vincent Siew	Jan 3, 1939	69 years, 138 days May 20, 2008	73 years, 138 days May 20, 2012	13 years, 250 days	(living)	87 years, 22 days
10	Wu Den-yih	Jan 30, 1948	64 years, 111 days May 20, 2012	68 years, 111 days May 20, 2016	9 years, 250 days	(living)	77 years, 360 days
11	Chen Chien-jen	Jun 6, 1951	64 years, 349 days May 20, 2016	68 years, 349 days May 20, 2020	5 years, 250 days	(living)	74 years, 233 days
12	William Lai	Oct 6, 1959	60 years, 227 days May 20, 2020	64 years, 227 days May 20, 2024	1 year, 250 days	(living)	66 years, 111 days
13	Hsiao Bi-khim	Aug 7, 1971	52 years, 287 days May 20, 2024	(incumbent)	(incumbent)	(living)	54 years, 171 days

== Premier (President of the Executive Yuan) ==
As of January 2026, fifteen former premiers of the Republic of China are still alive. The most recent death of a former premier was that of Chang Chun-hsiung (who was prime minister during 2000–2001 and 2007-2008) on 27 September 2025.

#	Premier	Born	Age at start of first term	Age at end of last term	Post-premiership timespan	Lifespan	
#	Premier	Born	Age at start of first term	Age at end of last term	Post-premiership timespan	Died	Age
1	Weng Wenhao	Jul 26, 1889	58 years, 304 days May 25, 1948	59 years, 123 days Nov 26, 1948	22 years, 62 days	Jan 27, 1971	81 years, 185 days
2	Sun Fo	Oct 21, 1891	57 years, 36 days Nov 26, 1948	57 years, 142 days Mar 12, 1949	24 years, 185 days	Sep 13, 1973	81 years, 327 days
3	He Yingqin	Apr 2, 1890	58 years, 344 days Mar 12, 1949	59 years, 72 days Jun 13, 1949	38 years, 130 days	Oct 21, 1987	97 years, 202 days
4	Yan Xishan	Oct 8, 1883	65 years, 248 days Jun 13, 1949	66 years, 153 days Mar 10, 1950	10 years, 134 days	Jul 22, 1960	76 years, 288 days
5	Chen Cheng	Jan 4, 1898	52 years, 65 days Mar 10, 1950	65 years, 346 days Dec 16, 1963	1 year, 79 days	Mar 5, 1965	67 years, 60 days
6	Yu Hung-chun	Jan 4, 1898	56 years, 148 days Jun 1, 1954	60 years, 192 days Jul 15, 1958	1 year, 322 days	Jun 1, 1960	62 years, 149 days
7	Yen Chia-kan	Oct 23, 1905	58 years, 54 days Dec 16, 1963	66 years, 222 days Jun 1, 1972	21 years, 206 days	Dec 24, 1993	88 years, 62 days
8	Chiang Ching-kuo	Apr 27, 1910	62 years, 35 days Jun 1, 1972	68 years, 23 days May 20, 1978	9 years, 238 days	Jan 13, 1988	77 years, 261 days
9	Sun Yun-suan	Nov 10, 1913	64 years, 203 days Jun 1, 1978	70 years, 204 days Jun 1, 1984	21 years, 259 days	Feb 15, 2006	92 years, 97 days
10	Yu Kuo-hwa	Jan 10, 1914	70 years, 143 days Jun 1, 1984	75 years, 142 days Jun 1, 1989	11 years, 125 days	Oct 4, 2000	86 years, 268 days
11	Lee Huan	Feb 8, 1917	72 years, 113 days Jun 1, 1989	73 years, 113 days Jun 1, 1990	20 years, 184 days	Dec 2, 2010	93 years, 297 days
12	Hau Pei-tsun	Aug 8, 1919	70 years, 297 days Jun 1, 1990	73 years, 203 days Feb 27, 1993	27 years, 32 days	Mar 30, 2020	100 years, 235 days
13	Lien Chan	Aug 27, 1936	56 years, 184 days Feb 27, 1993	61 years, 5 days Sep 1, 1997	28 years, 146 days	(living)	89 years, 151 days
14	Vincent Siew	Jan 3, 1939	58 years, 241 days Sep 1, 1997	61 years, 138 days May 20, 2000	25 years, 250 days	(living)	87 years, 22 days
15	Tang Fei	Mar 15, 1932	68 years, 66 days May 20, 2000	68 years, 205 days Oct 6, 2000	25 years, 111 days	(living)	93 years, 316 days
16	Chang Chun-hsiung	Mar 23, 1938	62 years, 197 days Oct 6, 2000	70 years, 58 days May 20, 2008	17 years, 130 days	Sep 27, 2025	87 years, 188 days
17	Yu Shyi-kun	Apr 25, 1948	53 years, 282 days Feb 1, 2002	56 years, 282 days Feb 1, 2005	20 years, 358 days	(living)	77 years, 275 days
18	Frank Hsieh	May 18, 1946	58 years, 259 days Feb 1, 2005	59 years, 252 days Jan 25, 2006	20 years, 0 days	(living)	79 years, 252 days
19	Su Tseng-chang	Jul 28, 1947	58 years, 181 days Jan 25, 2006	75 years, 187 days Jan 31, 2023	2 years, 359 days	(living)	78 years, 181 days
20	Liu Chao-shiuan	May 10, 1943	65 years, 10 days May 20, 2008	66 years, 123 days Sep 10, 2009	16 years, 137 days	(living)	82 years, 260 days
21	Wu Den-yih	Jan 30, 1948	61 years, 223 days Sep 10, 2009	64 years, 7 days Feb 6, 2012	13 years, 353 days	(living)	77 years, 360 days
22	Chen Chun	Oct 13, 1949	62 years, 116 days Feb 6, 2012	63 years, 128 days Feb 18, 2013	12 years, 341 days	(living)	76 years, 104 days
23	Jiang Yi-huah	Nov 18, 1960	52 years, 92 days Feb 18, 2013	54 years, 20 days Dec 8, 2014	11 years, 48 days	(living)	65 years, 68 days
24	Mao Chi-kuo	Oct 4, 1948	66 years, 65 days Dec 8, 2014	67 years, 120 days Feb 1, 2016	9 years, 358 days	(living)	77 years, 113 days
25	Chang San-cheng	Jun 24, 1954	61 years, 222 days Feb 1, 2016	61 years, 331 days May 20, 2016	9 years, 250 days	(living)	71 years, 215 days
26	Lin Chuan	Dec 13, 1951	64 years, 159 days May 20, 2016	65 years, 269 days Sep 8, 2017	8 years, 139 days	(living)	74 years, 43 days
27	William Lai	Oct 6, 1959	57 years, 337 days Sep 8, 2017	59 years, 100 days Jan 14, 2019	7 years, 11 days	(living)	66 years, 111 days
28	Chen Chien-jen	Jun 6, 1951	71 years, 239 days Jan 31, 2023	72 years, 349 days May 20, 2024	1 year, 250 days	(living)	74 years, 233 days
29	Cho Jung-tai	Jan 22, 1959	65 years, 119 days May 20, 2024	Incumbent	Incumbent	(living)	67 years, 3 days

== President of the Legislative Yuan ==
As of January 2026, three former presidents of the Legislative Yuan are still alive. The most recent death of a former premier was that of Liu Sung-pan (who was president of the Yuan during 1992–1999) on 18 November 2016.

#	Speaker	Born	Age at start of first term	Age at end of last term	Post-speakership timespan	Lifespan	
#	Speaker	Born	Age at start of first term	Age at end of last term	Post-speakership timespan	Died	Age
1	Sun Fo	Oct 21, 1891	56 years, 209 days May 17, 1948	57 years, 64 days Dec 24, 1948	24 years, 263 days	Sep 13, 1973	81 years, 327 days
2	Tung Gun-shin	May 16, 1894	54 years, 222 days Dec 24, 1948	56 years, 144 days Oct 7, 1950	30 years, 304 days	Aug 7, 1981	87 years, 83 days
3	Liu Chien-chun	1902	47 or 48 years Dec 5, 1950	48 or 49 years Oct 19, 1951	20 years, 150 days	Mar 17, 1972	70 or 71 years
4	Chang Tao-fan	Aug 9, 1897	54 years, 215 days Mar 11, 1952	63 years, 195 days Feb 20, 1961	7 years, 113 days	Jun 12, 1968	70 years, 308 days
5	Huang Kuo-shu	Aug 8, 1905	55 years, 204 days Feb 28, 1961	66 years, 195 days Feb 19, 1972	15 years, 292 days	Dec 8, 1987	82 years, 122 days
6	Ni Wen-ya	Mar 2, 1902	70 years, 61 days May 2, 1972	86 years, 293 days Dec 20, 1988	17 years, 165 days	Jun 3, 2006	104 years, 93 days
7	Liu Kuo-tsai	1911	77 or 78 years Feb 24, 1989	78 or 79 years Feb 20, 1990	3 years, 90 days	May 21, 1993	81 or 82 years
8	Liang Su-yung	Aug 8, 1920	69 years, 203 days Feb 27, 1990	71 years, 145 days Dec 31, 1991	12 years, 240 days	Aug 27, 2004	84 years, 19 days
9	Liu Sung-pan	Dec 3, 1931	60 years, 45 days Jan 17, 1992	67 years, 60 days Feb 1, 1999	17 years, 291 days	Nov 18, 2016	84 years, 351 days
10	Wang Jin-pyng	Mar 17, 1941	57 years, 321 days Feb 1, 1999	74 years, 321 days Feb 1, 2016	9 years, 358 days	(living)	84 years, 314 days
11	Su Jia-chyuan	Oct 22, 1956	59 years, 102 days Feb 1, 2016	63 years, 102 days Feb 1, 2020	5 years, 358 days	(living)	69 years, 95 days
12	Yu Shyi-kun	Apr 25, 1948	71 years, 282 days Feb 1, 2020	75 years, 282 days Feb 1, 2024	1 year, 358 days	(living)	77 years, 275 days
13	Han Kuo-yu	Jun 17, 1957	66 years, 229 days Feb 1, 2024	(incumbent)	(incumbent)	(living)	68 years, 222 days

== President of the Examination Yuan ==
As of January 2026, four former presidents of the Yuan are still alive. The most recent death of a former Examination Yuan president was that of Hsu Shui-teh (who was President of the Yuan during 1996–2002) on 31 March 2021.

#	Yuan President	Born	Age at start of presidency	Age at end of presidency	Post-presidency timespan	Lifespan	
#	Yuan President	Born	Age at start of presidency	Age at end of presidency	Post-presidency timespan	Died	Age
1	Chang Po-ling	Apr 5, 1876	72 years, 96 days Jul 10, 1948	73 years, 234 days Nov 25, 1949	1 year, 90 days	Feb 23, 1951	74 years, 324 days
2	Chia Ching-teh	Aug 28, 1880	71 years, 237 days Apr 21, 1952	74 years, 4 days Sep 1, 1954	6 years, 50 days	Oct 21, 1960	80 years, 54 days
3	Mo Teh-hui	Apr 16, 1883	71 years, 138 days Sep 1, 1954	83 years, 138 days Sep 1, 1966	1 year, 229 days	Apr 17, 1968	87 years, 233 days
4	Sun Fo	Oct 21, 1891	74 years, 315 days Sep 1, 1966	81 years, 327 days Sep 13, 1973	0 days	Sep 13, 1973	81 years, 327 days
4	Yang Liang-kung	Aug 8, 1895	78 years, 73 days Oct 20, 1973	83 years, 24 days Sep 1, 1978	13 years, 129 days	Jan 8, 1992	96 years, 153 days
5	Liu Chi-hung	Apr 18, 1904	74 years, 136 days Sep 1, 1978	80 years, 136 days Sep 1, 1984	4 years, 136 days	Jan 15, 1989	84 years, 272 days
6	Kung Teh-cheng	Feb 23, 1920	64 years, 191 days Sep 1, 1984	73 years, 60 days Apr 24, 1993	15 years, 187 days	Oct 28, 2008	88 years, 248 days
7	Chiu Chuang-huan	Jul 25, 1925	67 years, 273 days Apr 24, 1993	71 years, 38 days Sep 1, 1996	23 years, 305 days	Jul 2, 2020	94 years, 343 days
8	Hsu Shui-teh	Aug 1, 1931	65 years, 31 days Sep 1, 1996	71 years, 31 days Sep 1, 2002	18 years, 211 days	Mar 31, 2021	89 years, 242 days
9	Yao Chia-wen	Jun 15, 1938	64 years, 78 days Sep 1, 2002	70 years, 78 days Sep 1, 2008	17 years, 146 days	(living)	87 years, 224 days
10	John Kuan	Jun 9, 1940	68 years, 175 days Dec 1, 2008	74 years, 84 days Sep 1, 2014	11 years, 146 days	(living)	85 years, 230 days
11	Wu Jin-lin	Oct 6, 1947	66 years, 330 days Sep 1, 2014	72 years, 331 days Sep 1, 2020	5 years, 146 days	(living)	78 years, 111 days
12	Huang Jong-tsun	Mar 30, 1947	73 years, 155 days Sep 1, 2020	77 years, 155 days Sep 1, 2024	1 year, 146 days	(living)	78 years, 301 days
13	Chou Hung-hsien	Nov 23, 1953	71 years, 27 days Dec 20, 2024	(incumbent)	(incumbent)	(living)	72 years, 63 days

== President of the Control Yuan ==
As of January 2026, four former presidents of the Yuan are still alive. The most recent death of a former Control Yuan president was that of Wang Tso-yung (who was President of the Yuan during 1996–1999) on 31 July 2013.

#	Yuan President	Born	Age at start of presidency	Age at end of presidency	Post-presidency timespan	Lifespan	
#	Yuan President	Born	Age at start of presidency	Age at end of presidency	Post-presidency timespan	Died	Age
1	Yu You-ren	Apr 11, 1879	69 years, 59 days Jun 9, 1948	85 years, 213 days Nov 10, 1964	0 days	Nov 10, 1964	85 years, 213 days
2	Lee Shih-tsung	1898	66 or 67 years Aug 17, 1965	73 or 74 years May 15, 1972	0 days	May 15, 1972	73 or 74 years
3	Yu Chun-hsien	Dec 31, 1901	71 years, 78 days Mar 19, 1973	85 years, 70 days Mar 11, 1987	6 years, 316 days	Jan 21, 1994	92 years, 21 days
4	Huang Tsun-chiu	Dec 5, 1923	63 years, 97 days Mar 12, 1987	69 years, 57 days Jan 31, 1993	7 years, 298 days	Nov 24, 2000	76 years, 355 days
5	Chen Li-an	Jun 22, 1937	55 years, 224 days Feb 1, 1993	58 years, 93 days Sep 23, 1995	30 years, 124 days	(living)	88 years, 217 days
6	Wang Tso-yung	Feb 6, 1919	77 years, 208 days Sep 1, 1996	79 years, 359 days Jan 31, 1999	14 years, 181 days	Jul 31, 2013	94 years, 175 days
7	Frederick Chien	Feb 17, 1935	63 years, 349 days Feb 1, 1999	69 years, 349 days Jan 31, 2005	20 years, 359 days	(living)	90 years, 342 days
8	Wang Chien-shien	Aug 7, 1938	69 years, 360 days Aug 1, 2008	75 years, 358 days Jul 31, 2014	11 years, 178 days	(living)	87 years, 171 days
9	Chang Po-ya	Oct 5, 1942	71 years, 300 days Aug 1, 2014	77 years, 300 days Jul 31, 2020	5 years, 178 days	(living)	83 years, 112 days
10	Chen Chu	Jun 10, 1950	70 years, 52 days Aug 1, 2020	(incumbent)	(incumbent)	(living)	75 years, 229 days
