= President of the Legislative Yuan =

Presiding officer of the parliament of the Republic of China

President of the Legislative Yuan of the Republic of China
- 立法院院長
- Emblem of the Legislative Yuan

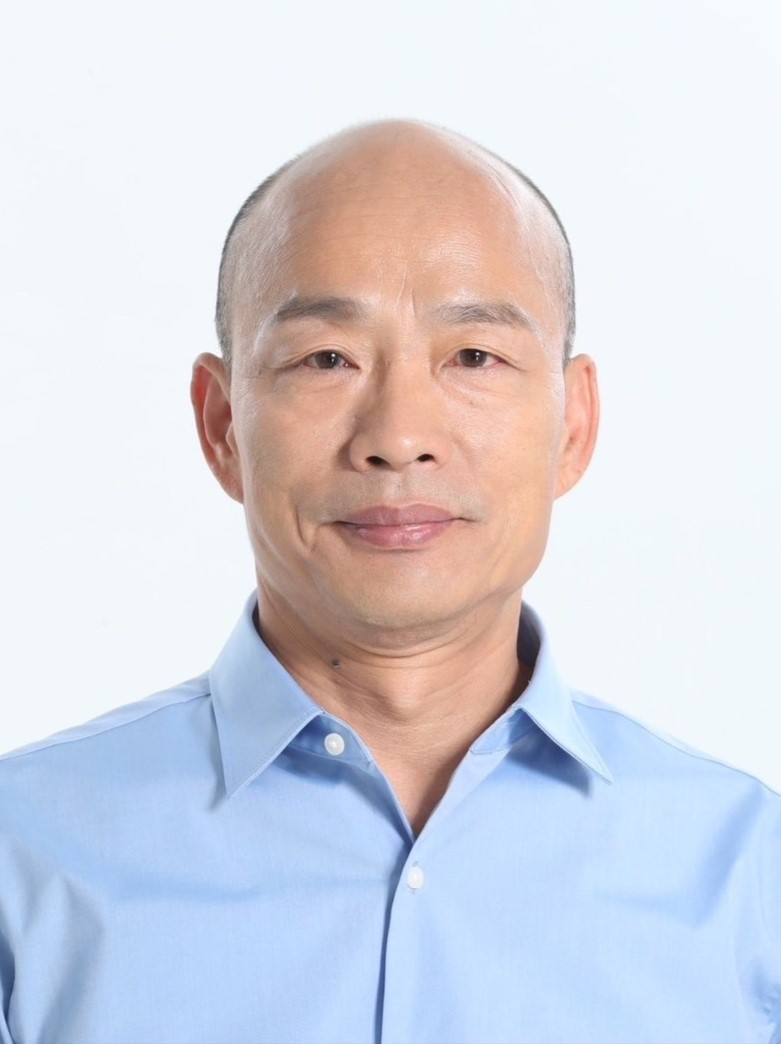
- Incumbent; Han Kuo-yu since 1 February 2024
- Legislative Yuan
- Style: Mr President (within Legislative Yuan)
- Seat: Zhongzheng District, Taipei
- Appointer: Legislative Yuan
- Term length: 4 years; renewable
- Constituting instrument: Article 66 of the Constitution of the Republic of China
- Formation: 8 October 1928; 97 years ago (original); 25 October 1945; 80 years ago (Taiwan handover); 17 May 1948; 78 years ago (1947 Constitution)
- First holder: Hu Hanmin
- Final holder: Tung Kuan-hsien (Mainland China)
- Abolished: 1 October 1949; 76 years ago (Mainland China)
- Succession: Chairman of the National Committee of the Chinese People's Political Consultative Conference; Chairman of the Standing Committee of the National People's Congress
- Unofficial names: Speaker of the Parliament of Taiwan
- Deputy: Vice President
- Website: www.ly.gov.tw

President of the Legislative Yuan
- Traditional Chinese: 立法院院長
- Simplified Chinese: 立法院院长
Transcriptions
Standard Mandarin
- Hanyu Pinyin: Lìfǎ Yuàn Yuànzhǎng
- Wade–Giles: Li^{4}-fa^{3}-yüan^{4} Yüan^{4}-chang^{3}
Hakka
- Pha̍k-fa-sṳ: Li̍p-fap Yen Yen-tshòng
Southern Min
- Hokkien POJ: Li̍p-hoat Īⁿ Īⁿ-tiúⁿ
- Tâi-lô: Li̍p-huat Īnn Īnn-tiúnn

The president of the Legislative Yuan is the presiding officer of the Legislative Yuan of the Republic of China, which formerly ruled mainland China before 1949.

The incumbent president is Han Kuo-yu, a legislator from the Kuomintang.

== Election ==
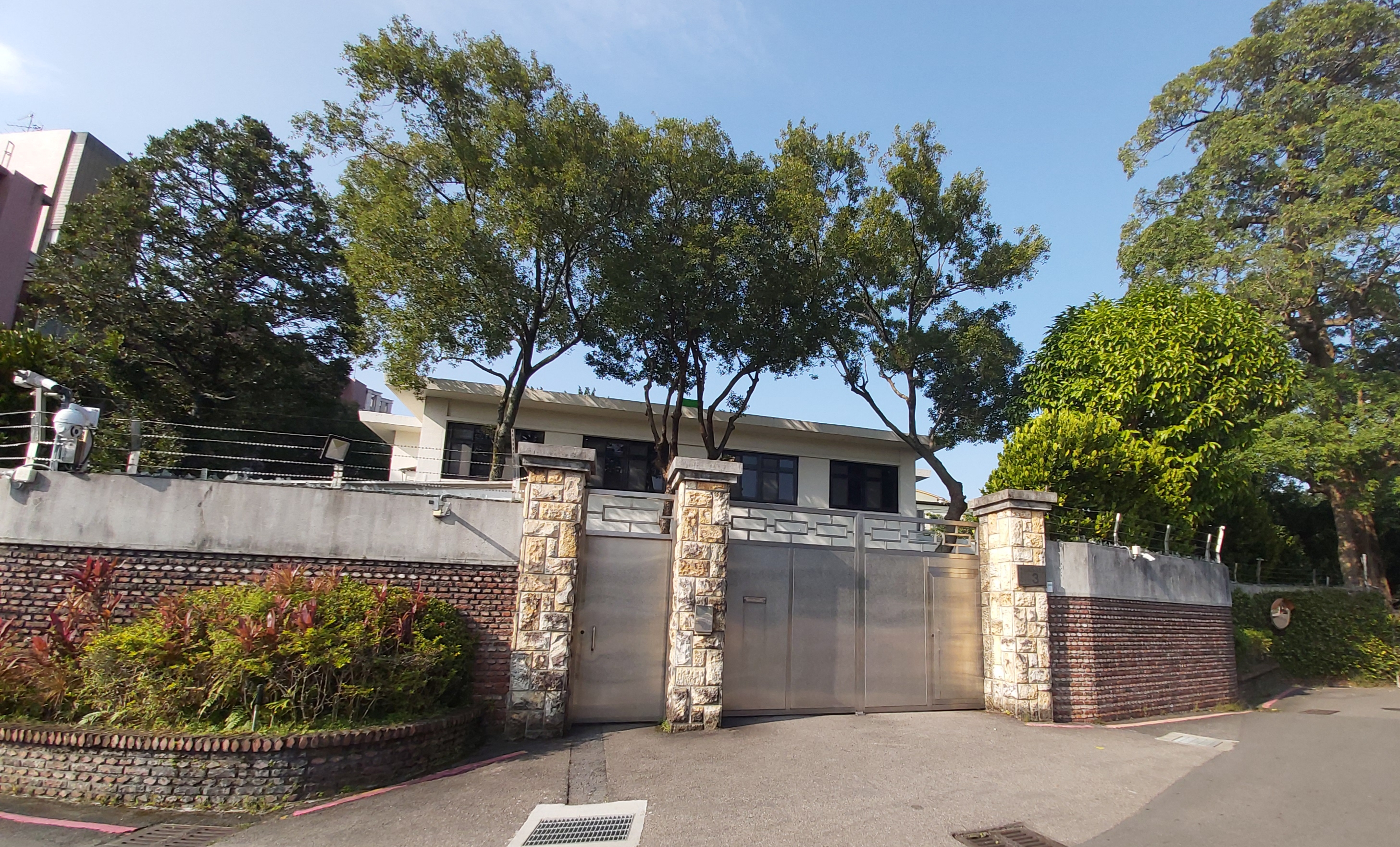
Official residence of President of the Legislative Yuan in Taipei.

The president is elected by and from among all members of the Yuan in a preparatory meeting held on the first reporting day of the first session of each Legislative Yuan, and he shall serve a term the same length as that of other members.

== Duty ==
The president presides over the Yuan Sittings and the meetings of the Committee of the Entire Yuan and is responsible for the administration of the Yuan. In the cases in which the president of the Legislative Yuan is unable to attend to his or her duties, the vice president acts in his or her place.

== List of presidents of the Legislative Yuan ==
=== Pre-1947 Constitution ===
During the Nationalist government era, the president of Legislative Yuan was appointed by the Central Committee of the Kuomintang (Nationalist Party).

Kuomintang

No.	Portrait	Name (Birth–Death)	Took office	Left office	Political party	Chairman
1		Hu Hanmin 胡漢民; Hú Hànmín	8 Oct 1928	2 Mar 1931	Kuomintang	Tan Yankai (Kuomintang)
1		Hu Hanmin 胡漢民; Hú Hànmín	8 Oct 1928	2 Mar 1931	Kuomintang	Chiang Kai-shek (Kuomintang)
2		Lin Sen 林森; Lín Sēn	2 Mar 1931	1 Jan 1932	Kuomintang	Chiang Kai-shek (Kuomintang)
2		Lin Sen 林森; Lín Sēn	2 Mar 1931	1 Jan 1932	Kuomintang	Lin Sen (Kuomintang)
—		Shao Yuanchong 邵元沖; Shào Yuánchōng	2 Mar 1931	1 Jan 1932	Kuomintang	Lin Sen (Kuomintang)
3		Chang Chi 張繼; Zhāng Jì	1 Jan 1932	28 Jan 1932	Kuomintang	Lin Sen (Kuomintang)
—		Qin Zhen 覃振; Qín Zhèn	1 Jan 1932	14 May 1932	Kuomintang	Lin Sen (Kuomintang)
—		Shao Yuanchong 邵元沖; Shào Yuánchōng	14 May 1932	1 Dec 1932	Kuomintang	Lin Sen (Kuomintang)
4		Sun Fo 孫科; Sūn Kē	29 Jan 1932	17 May 1948	Kuomintang	Lin Sen (Kuomintang)
4		Sun Fo 孫科; Sūn Kē	29 Jan 1932	17 May 1948	Kuomintang	Chiang Kai-shek (Kuomintang)

=== 1947 Constitution ===
The first Legislative Yuan election under the 1947 Constitution of the Republic of China was held in 1948. However, the government retreated to Taiwan in 1949. Members of the first Legislative Yuan had their terms extended indefinitely and the sessions of the first Legislative Yuan were conducted in Taiwan until December 31, 1991 while some supplementary members kept serving until January 31, 1993.

Kuomintang

№	Portrait	Name (Birth–Death)	Took office	Left office	Term	Electoral mandates (Supplementary elections)	Political party	President
1		Sun Fo 孫科; Sūn Kē (1891-1973); MLY for Canton at-large	17 May 1948	24 Dec 1948	1	1948	Kuomintang	Chiang Kai-shek (KMT)
2		Tung Kuan-hsien 童冠賢; Tóng Guānxián (1894-1981); MLY for Chahar at-large	24 Dec 1948	7 Oct 1950	1	—	Kuomintang	Chiang Kai-shek (KMT)
3		Liu Chien-chun 劉健群; Liú Jiànqún (1903-1972); MLY for Kweichow 2nd District	5 Dec 1950	19 Oct 1951	1	—	Kuomintang	Chiang Kai-shek (KMT)
—		Huang Kuo-shu 黃國書; Huáng Guóshū (1905-1987); MLY for Taiwan at-large	19 Oct 1951	11 Mar 1952	1	—	Kuomintang	Chiang Kai-shek (KMT)
4		Chang Tao-fan 張道藩; Zhāng Dàofān (1897-1968); MLY for Kweichow 2nd District	11 Mar 1952	20 Feb 1961	1	—	Kuomintang	Chiang Kai-shek (KMT)
5		Huang Kuo-shu 黃國書; Huáng Guóshū (1905-1987); MLY for Taiwan at-large	28 Feb 1961	19 Feb 1972	1	1948, 1969	Kuomintang	Chiang Kai-shek (KMT)
—		Ni Wen-ya 倪文亞; Ní Wényà (1902-2006); MLY for Chekiang 3rd District	19 Feb 1972	2 May 1972	1	—	Kuomintang	Chiang Kai-shek (KMT)
6		Ni Wen-ya 倪文亞; Ní Wényà (1902-2006); MLY for Chekiang 3rd District	2 May 1972	20 Dec 1988	1	1948, 1969, 1972	Kuomintang	Chiang Kai-shek (KMT)
6		Ni Wen-ya 倪文亞; Ní Wényà (1902-2006); MLY for Chekiang 3rd District	2 May 1972	20 Dec 1988	1	1948, 1969, 1975	Kuomintang	Yen Chia-kan (KMT)
6		Ni Wen-ya 倪文亞; Ní Wényà (1902-2006); MLY for Chekiang 3rd District	2 May 1972	20 Dec 1988	1	1948, 1969, 1980; 1948, 1969, 1983; 1948, 1969, 1986	Kuomintang	Chiang Ching-kuo (KMT)
6		Ni Wen-ya 倪文亞; Ní Wényà (1902-2006); MLY for Chekiang 3rd District	2 May 1972	20 Dec 1988	1	—	Kuomintang	Lee Teng-hui (KMT)
—		Liu Kuo-tsai 劉闊才; Liú Kuòcái (1911-1993); MLY for Taiwan 1st District	20 Dec 1988	24 Feb 1989	1	—	Kuomintang	Lee Teng-hui (KMT)
7		Liu Kuo-tsai 劉闊才; Liú Kuòcái (1911-1993); MLY for Taiwan 1st District	24 Feb 1989	20 Feb 1990	1	—	Kuomintang	Lee Teng-hui (KMT)
—		Liang Su-yung 梁肅戎 (1920-2004); Liáng Sùróng; MLY for Liaopeh at-large	20 Feb 1990	27 Feb 1990	1	1948, 1969, 1989	Kuomintang	Lee Teng-hui (KMT)
8		Liang Su-yung 梁肅戎 (1920-2004); Liáng Sùróng; MLY for Liaopeh at-large	27 Feb 1990	31 Dec 1991	1	1948, 1969, 1989	Kuomintang	Lee Teng-hui (KMT)
9		Liu Sung-pan 劉松藩; Liú Sōngfān (1931-2016); MLY for Taiwan 6th District	17 Jan 1992	1 Feb 1993	1	1989	Kuomintang	Lee Teng-hui (KMT)

=== 1991 Constitution amendment ===
The Additional Articles of the Constitution promulgated in 1991 mandated the total re-election of Legislative Yuan in Taiwan.

Kuomintang Democratic Progressive Party

No.	Portrait	Name (Birth–Death)	Took office	Left office	Term	Electoral mandates (Proportional vote share)	Political party	President (Government)
(9)		Liu Sung-pan 劉松藩; Liú Sōngfān (Mandarin); Lâu Siông-phoan (Taiwanese); Liù Chhiùng-fân (Hakka) (1931-2016); MLY for Taichung County	1 Feb 1993	1 Feb 1996	2	1992 53.0%	Kuomintang	Lee Teng-hui (KMT) (Majority)
(9)		Liu Sung-pan 劉松藩; Liú Sōngfān (Mandarin); Lâu Siông-phoan (Taiwanese); Liù Chhiùng-fân (Hakka) (1931-2016); MLY for Taichung County	1 Feb 1996	1 Feb 1999	3	1995 46.1%	Kuomintang	Lee Teng-hui (KMT) (Majority)
10		Wang Jin-pyng 王金平; Wáng Jīnpíng (Mandarin); Ông Kim-pêng (Taiwanese); Vòng Kîm-phiàng (Hakka) (1941-); MLY for Kaohsiung County until 2005; MLY for Nationwide KMT at-large №1 from 2005	1 Feb 1999	1 Feb 2002	4	1998 46.4%	Kuomintang	Lee Teng-hui (KMT) (Majority)
10		Wang Jin-pyng 王金平; Wáng Jīnpíng (Mandarin); Ông Kim-pêng (Taiwanese); Vòng Kîm-phiàng (Hakka) (1941-); MLY for Kaohsiung County until 2005; MLY for Nationwide KMT at-large №1 from 2005	1 Feb 1999	1 Feb 2002	4	1998 46.4%	Kuomintang	Chen Shui-bian (DPP) (Minority)
10		Wang Jin-pyng 王金平; Wáng Jīnpíng (Mandarin); Ông Kim-pêng (Taiwanese); Vòng Kîm-phiàng (Hakka) (1941-); MLY for Kaohsiung County until 2005; MLY for Nationwide KMT at-large №1 from 2005	1 Feb 2002	1 Feb 2005	5	2001 31.3% + 23.2% (Pan-Blue Coalition)	Kuomintang	Chen Shui-bian (DPP) (Minority)
10		Wang Jin-pyng 王金平; Wáng Jīnpíng (Mandarin); Ông Kim-pêng (Taiwanese); Vòng Kîm-phiàng (Hakka) (1941-); MLY for Kaohsiung County until 2005; MLY for Nationwide KMT at-large №1 from 2005	1 Feb 2005	1 Feb 2008	6	2004 34.9% + 14.9% (Pan-Blue Coalition)	Kuomintang	Chen Shui-bian (DPP) (Minority)
10		Wang Jin-pyng 王金平; Wáng Jīnpíng (Mandarin); Ông Kim-pêng (Taiwanese); Vòng Kîm-phiàng (Hakka) (1941-); MLY for Kaohsiung County until 2005; MLY for Nationwide KMT at-large №1 from 2005	1 Feb 2008	1 Feb 2012	7	2008 53.5%	Kuomintang	Ma Ying-jeou (KMT) (Majority: 2008-2016) (Minority: 2016)
10		Wang Jin-pyng 王金平; Wáng Jīnpíng (Mandarin); Ông Kim-pêng (Taiwanese); Vòng Kîm-phiàng (Hakka) (1941-); MLY for Kaohsiung County until 2005; MLY for Nationwide KMT at-large №1 from 2005	1 Feb 2012	1 Feb 2016	8	2012 44.5%	Kuomintang	Ma Ying-jeou (KMT) (Majority: 2008-2016) (Minority: 2016)
11		Su Jia-chyuan 蘇嘉全; Sū Jiāquán (Mandarin); So͘ Ka-choân (Taiwanese); Sû Kâ-chhiòn (Hakka) (1956-); MLY for Nationwide DPP at-large №9	1 Feb 2016	1 Feb 2020	9	2016 44.1%	Democratic Progressive	Tsai Ing-wen (DPP) (Majority: 2016-2024) (Minority: 2024)
12		You Si-kun 游錫堃; Yóu Xíkūn (Mandarin); Iû Sek-khun (Taiwanese); Yù Siak-khûn (Hakka) (1948-); MLY for Nationwide DPP at-large №7	1 Feb 2020	1 Feb 2024	10	2020 34.0%	Democratic Progressive	Tsai Ing-wen (DPP) (Majority: 2016-2024) (Minority: 2024)
13		Han Kuo-yu 韓國瑜; Hán Guóyǘ (Mandarin) (1957-); MLY for Nationwide KMT at-large №1	1 Feb 2024	Incumbent	11	2024 34.6%	Kuomintang	Tsai Ing-wen (DPP) (Majority: 2016-2024) (Minority: 2024)
13		Han Kuo-yu 韓國瑜; Hán Guóyǘ (Mandarin) (1957-); MLY for Nationwide KMT at-large №1	1 Feb 2024	Incumbent	11	2024 34.6%	Kuomintang	Lai Ching-te (DPP) (Minority)

== See also ==
- Legislative Yuan
- Legislative elections in Taiwan
- Government of the Republic of China
- List of political office-holders of the Republic of China by age
- Chairman of the Standing Committee of the National People's Congress
