= Huang Guoshu =

Huang Guoshu may refer to:

- Huang Guo-shu (1905–1987), Taiwanese politician, President of the Legislative Yuan from 1961 to 1972
- Huang Kuo-shu (born 1964), Taiwanese politician, member of the Legislative Yuan since 2015

== See also ==
- Huang Guo Shu Waterfall
