= Qin Zhen =

- 覃振
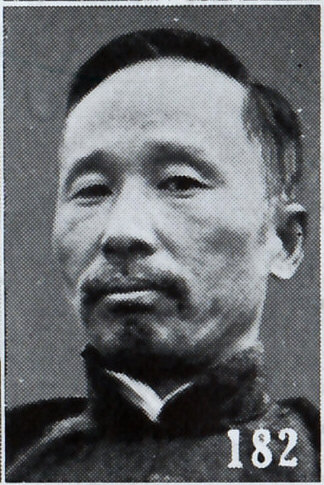
- Qin Zhen as pictured in The Most Recent Biographies of Chinese Dignitaries

Vice President of the Judicial Yuan
- In office March 1932 – April 1947
- President: Ju Zheng
- Preceded by: Ju Zheng
- Succeeded by: Li Wenfan

Acting President of the Legislative Yuan
- In office 1 January 1932 – 14 May 1932
- Preceded by: Hu Hanmin; Shao Yuanchong (acting)
- Succeeded by: Shao Yuanchong (acting); Sun Fo

Vice President of the Legislative Yuan
- In office 28 December 1931 – 14 May 1932
- President: Shao Yuanchong
- Preceded by: Shao Yuanchong
- Succeeded by: Shao Yuanchong (acting); Ye Chucang

Personal details
- Born: 1885 Taoyuan County, China
- Died: April 18, 1947 (aged 61–62) Shanghai, China

Qin Zhen (Chinese: 覃振; Wade–Giles: Ch'in Chen; 1885 – 18 April 1947) was a Chinese politician.

== Life and career ==
A native of Taoyuan County, Qin was born Daorang and known by the courtesy name Liming. He met Song Jiaoren and Hu Ying (revolutionary) in 1899. Qin attended Changde First Middle School, but was expelled after refusing to swear allegiance to the Qing dynasty. Subsequently, Qin completed his schooling in Japan and joined the Huaxinghui. He returned to Taoyuan, married Song Zhizhao, and left for Japan, where he became a member of the Tongmenghui.

The Tongmenghui sent Qin back to China, where he attended the funeral of Chen Tianhua and other revolutionaries. After Qing authorities noted his presence in China, Qin began his third journey to Japan, studying law at Waseda University. Qin was arrested in 1908, soon after having traveled to China. Released after the Wuchang Uprising, Qin joined the Progressive Association and was active in the Xinhai Revolution.

Qin made his way to Japan in 1913, after the Second Revolution, and there, joined the Kuomintang. Sun Yat-sen appointed Qin to several party posts in Hunan. During this time, he married his second wife, Mei Hexiu. In 1924, Qin attended the Kuomintang First National Congress, where he was elected to the KMT's central executive committee. Following the meeting, Qin was sent to Wuhan. Following Sun Yat-sen's death, Qin became a member of the Western Hills Group.

In 1931, Qin assumed the deputy speakership of the Legislative Yuan. He left the post in 1932, becoming the vice president of the Judicial Yuan, where he remained until 1947. As the Second Sino-Japanese War broke out, Qin called for the Communist Party and the Kuomintang to work together. He resigned from the Judicial Yuan in the midst Second Chinese Civil War for health reasons, and moved to Shanghai. Zhou Enlai visited Qin there in February 1947, and he died months later on 18 April 1947, survived by a third wife, Quan Ruzhen. A state funeral commemorating Qin, Bo Wenwei, Chen Qimei, Zhang Ji, Hao Mengling, and Li Jiayu was held on 19 May 1948, and Qin was interred on Yuelu Mountain.

== Personal life ==
Qin was married three times, and had thirteen children.
