= Ku Meng-yu =

Chinese engineer and politician (1888-1972)

- 顧孟餘
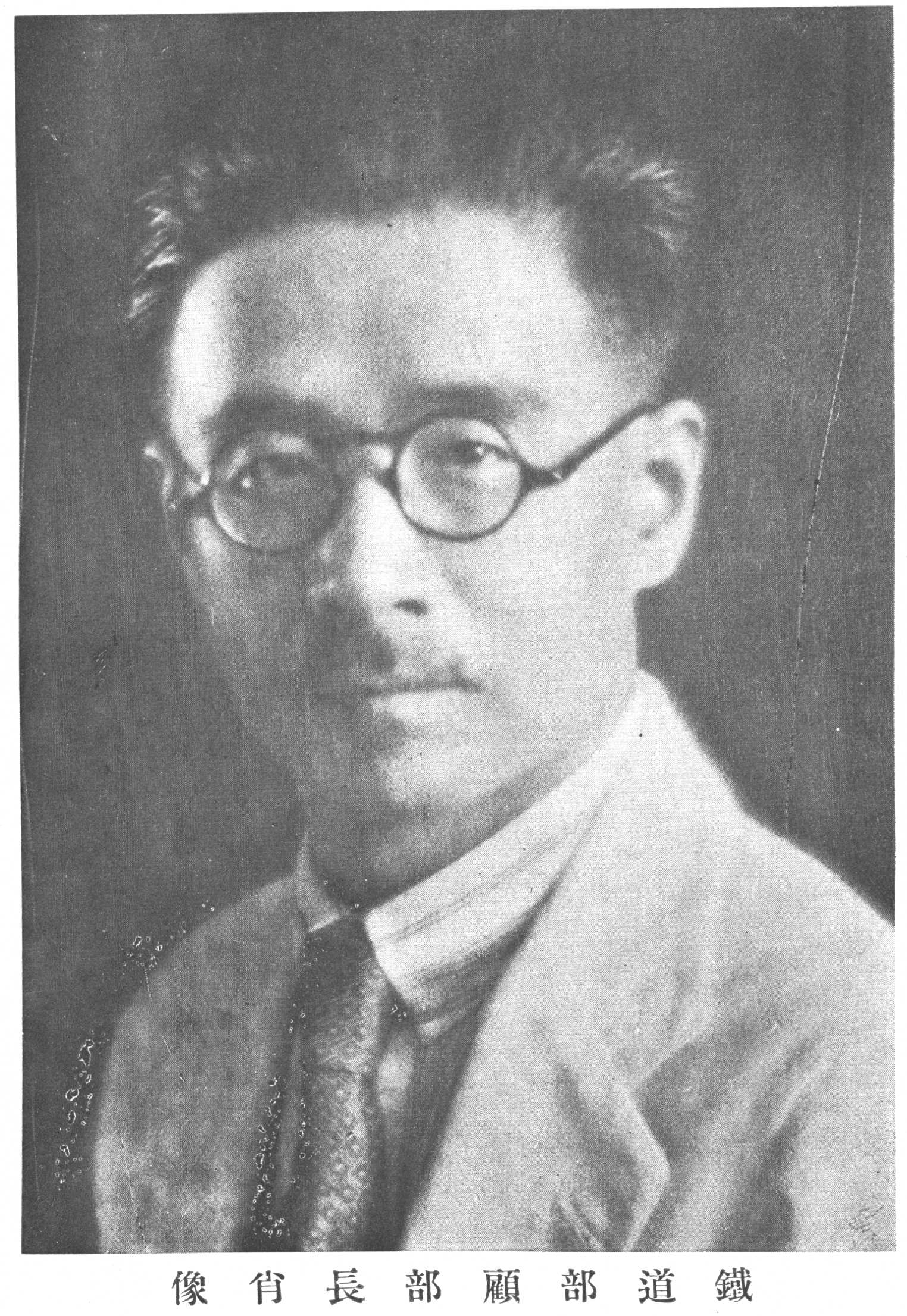

Vice Premier of China
- In office 24 May 1948 – 22 June 1948
- Premier: Weng Wenhao
- Preceded by: Wang Yun-wu
- Succeeded by: Chang Li-sheng

Personal details
- Born: 1888 Zhili, Qing Dynasty
- Died: 25 June 1972 (aged 83–84) Taipei, Taiwan
- Party: Kuomintang
- Other political affiliations: Reorganization Group

Ku Meng-yu (Chinese: 顧孟餘; pinyin: Gù Mèngyú; 1888 – June 25, 1972), also known as Gu Mengyu, was a politician in the Republic of China, the founding president of the Central Daily News and a key member of the Reorganization Group of the Kuomintang. Following the Chinese Civil War, he worked with Zhang Fakui, Carsun Chang, and Tung Kuan-hsien to form a third party, until he left for the United States in 1955.

== Biography ==
Ku was born in Beijing in 1888 into a family of officials who had obtained their positions through the imperial examination system. In 1906, Ku received a government scholarship to study electrical engineering at the Leipzig University, but he soon transferred to the Humboldt University of Berlin to pursue studies in political economy due to a lack of interest in his original field.

In 1910, Ku joined the Tongmenghui (Chinese United League). The following year, he briefly returned to China to participate in the Xinhai Revolution. In 1912, he married Wei Zengying (韋增瑛, 1884-1975), a fellow overseas student in Germany who was known as a "modern woman" (時髦女性). The wedding ceremony was officiated by Cai Yuanpei. They had no children.

In 1913, during the Second Revolution against Yuan Shikai, Ku Meng-yu returned to China to join the anti-Yuan forces. Following the revolution's failure in September, he fled to Shanghai. In 1914, he was employed as an engineer by Siemens and relocated to Beijing.

In 1916, at the invitation of Cai Yuanpei, Ku became a professor at Peking University, where he successively served as Head of the Department of German in the Faculty of Arts, Head of the Department of Economics in the Faculty of Law, and Dean of Academic Affairs. As both the university’s academic dean and president of the Beijing Education Association, he actively participated in public gatherings.

In 1924, Ku joined the Kuomintang (KMT) through the introduction of Li Dazhao, Cai Yuanpei, and Li Shizeng. He was appointed Chief Organizer of the KMT Beijing Municipal Committee. In 1925, he became President of National Guangdong University (later Sun Yat-sen University). In 1926, Ku Meng-yu, along with Li Dazhao and Xu Qian, organized protests against the March 18 Massacre.

After the Chiang-Wang split in 1927, Ku joined the Wuhan Nationalist Government, which was loyal to Wang Jingwei, and served as Minister of Education and head of the Central Propaganda Department. During this time, he founded Central Daily News and served as its first president.

Ku also worked with Deng Yanda, Xu Qian, Tan Pingshan, and Mao Zedong to establish the Central Land Committee to address land reform issues. In June 1928, he co-founded and led the Reorganization Group alongside Chen Gongbo.

As a result, on March 15, 1929, Chiang Kai-shek convened the Kuomintang's Third National Congress in Nanjing. On March 20, the party officially issued a warning to Wang Jingwei, suspended Ku’s KMT membership for three years, and permanently expelled Gan Nai-kuang and Chen Gongbo.

In 1931, in response to the September 18 Incident, Chiang Kai-shek restored Ku Meng-yu's membership in the Kuomintang to foster unity. The following year, he appointed Ku as Minister of Railways. In 1935, Ku was promoted to Minister of Communications. However, in the same year, Ku retired in protest over the assassination of Wang Jingwei and subsequently lived in Europe and Hong Kong.

After the outbreak of the Second Sino-Japanese War in 1937, Ku returned to politics. In 1938, he resumed his role as Minister of Propaganda. In December of the same year, before Wang Jingwei left Chongqing, Ku attempted to persuade him to reconsider his decision, but his efforts were unsuccessful, and he parted ways with Wang's faction.

In 1941, Ku succeeded Luo Jialun as President of National Central University. He adopted a hands-off leadership style, focusing on efficiency and advocating for academic freedom, free from party interference. At the time, Guo Tingyi, a faculty member, praised Ku for his "impeccable demeanor" and described him as a leader who "didn't involve himself in many matters, spoke little, but when he did, his words were simple and clear." In 1943, dissatisfied with the educational conflicts between Zhu Jiahua and the CC Clique, Ku resigned and moved to the United States.

In 1948, Ku Meng-yu returned to Shanghai as an advisor to the Nationalist government. The following year, he moved to Hong Kong, where he joined Zhang Fakui, Carsun Chang, and Tung Kuan-hsien in organizing a Third Force movement. In early September, the League for Freedom and Democracy held its first secret meeting in Guangzhou, electing Ku as chairman, with Tung Kuan-hsien, Cheng Siyuan, Qiu Changwei, Huang Yuren, Gan Jiaxin, Li Yongmao, and Yin Shuxian as executive members.

After the movement failed, Ku went to Japan in 1952. In 1955, he relocated to Berkeley, California, where he served as an advisor at the University of California’s Center for Chinese Studies. In 1969, he returned to Taiwan, staying at the Wistaria Tea House, the home of his former student, economist Chou Te-wei. He died in 1972 at the age of 83 or 84.

== Legacy and assessment ==
=== Reception in PRC historiography ===
According to official narratives from the Chinese Communist Party's Party History archives, Ku Meng-yu is characterized as a prominent member of the left-wing faction within the Kuomintang and an active participant in the "Reorganization Group" , which opposed Chiang's military dictatorship while also rejecting the Communist Party's ideology of class struggle.

The CCP sources portray Ku as an ally of Wang Jingwei, with whom he was closely associated politically. He was described as a key figure in the National Government’s Ministry of Railways and as one of the main leaders of the Reorganization Clique, which advocated for the reform of the Kuomintang along moderate, capitalist, and bureaucratic lines.

During his tenure as Minister of Railways in the early 1930s, Ku is credited in these accounts with implementing a number of administrative and infrastructure reforms: improving railway logistics, increasing efficiency through standardized scheduling, reducing expenses by limiting hiring, and upgrading physical infrastructure. The archives highlight his efforts to obtain foreign loans, particularly from Germany, and to issue bonds for railway development, especially for the long-delayed Guangzhou–Hankou line.

While CCP historiography emphasizes Ku’s managerial competence and patriotism in infrastructure development, it frames his political career as subordination to Wang himself, capitalist management and notes his opposition to both Chiang’s regime and Communist revolutionary principles.
