= Lin Sen =

Chairman of the National Government of China from 1931 to 1943

- 林森
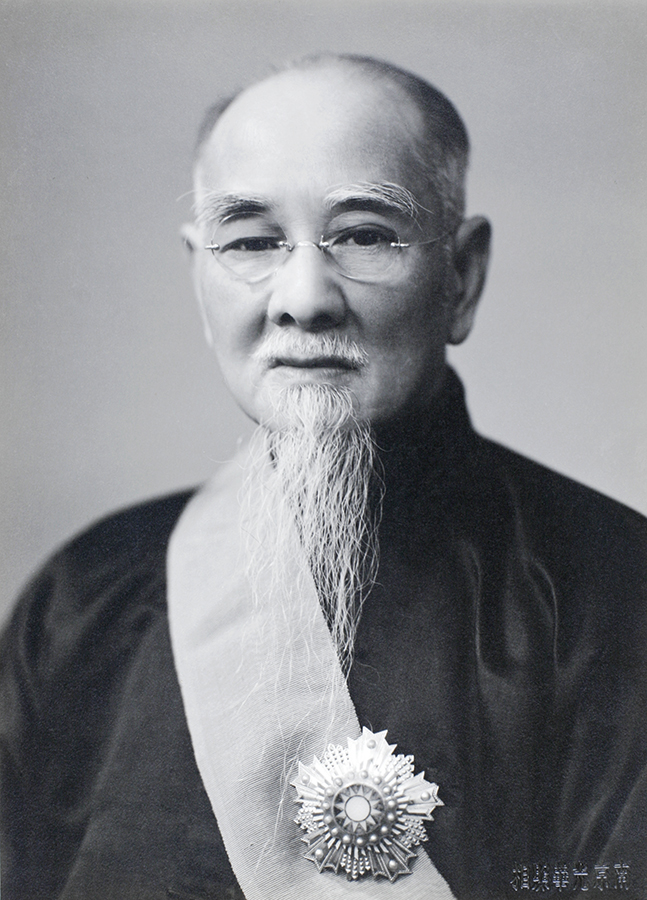

Chairman of the National Government of China
- In office 15 December 1931 – 1 August 1943
- Premier: Chen Mingshu (acting); Sun Fo; Wang Jingwei; Chiang Kai-shek; H.H. Kung
- Military chief: Chiang Kai-shek
- Preceded by: Chiang Kai-shek
- Succeeded by: Chiang Kai-shek (acting)

President of the Legislative Yuan
- In office 2 March 1931 – 1 January 1932
- Vice President: Shao Yuanchong
- Preceded by: Hu Hanmin
- Succeeded by: Shao Yuanchong (acting); Zhang Ji

Vice President of the Legislative Yuan
- In office 8 October 1928 – 2 March 1931
- President: Hu Hanmin
- Preceded by: Position established
- Succeeded by: Shao Yuanchong

Personal details
- Born: 16 March 1868 Minhou, Fujian, China
- Died: 1 August 1943 (aged 75) Chongqing, China
- Party: Kuomintang (Western Hills faction)
- Awards: Order of Brilliant Jade
- Lin Sen's voice Lin Sen speech on New Year's Day of the 30th year of the Republic of China; Recorded 1 January 1941

Lin Sen (Chinese: 林森; pinyin: Lín Sēn; 16 March 1868 – 1 August 1943) (Note: Courtesy name Zi Chao (Chinese: 子超; Wade–Giles: Tze-chao), sobriquet Zhang Ren (長仁; Chang-jen)) was a Chinese politician who served as Chairman of the National government of the Republic of China from 1931 until his death in 1943.

== Early life ==
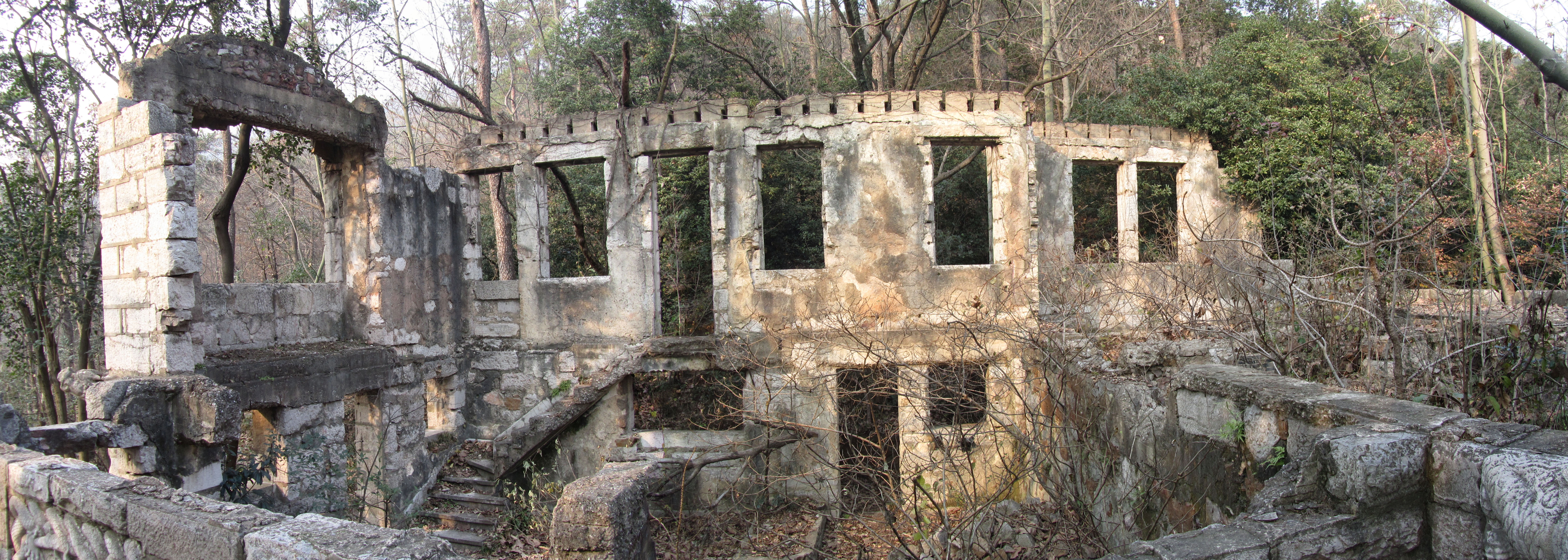
Former villa of Lin Sen in Nanjing.

Born to a middle-class family in Shanggan Township (尚幹鄉), Minhou County, Fuzhou, Lin was educated by American missionaries. He later worked in the Telegram Bureau of Taipei, Taiwan, in 1884. After the First Sino-Japanese War, he engaged in guerrilla activities against the Japanese occupiers. He returned to China and worked in the Shanghai customs office in 1902. He later lived in Hawaii and San Francisco.

There he was recruited by the Tongmenghui in 1905, and was an overseas organizer for the Kuomintang. During the Xinhai Revolution, he was in charge of the Jiangxi revolt. He became speaker of the senate in the National Assembly. After the failed Second Revolution against President Yuan Shikai, Lin fled with Sun Yat-sen to Japan and joined his Chinese Revolutionary Party. He was sent to the United States to raise funds from the party's local branches. In 1917, he followed Sun to Guangzhou where he continued to lead its "extraordinary session" during the Constitutional Protection Movement. When the assembly defected to the Beiyang government, he remained with Sun and later served as governor of Fujian.

Lin was a member of the right-wing Western Hills Group based in Shanghai. The group was formed in Beijing shortly after Sun's death in 1925. They called for a party congress to expel the Communists and to declare social revolution as incompatible with the Kuomintang's national revolution. The party pre-empted this faction and the ensuing congress expelled Western Hills' leaders and suspended the membership of the followers. They supported Chiang Kai-shek's purge of the communists in 1927. Lin rose to become the leader of the Western Hills faction and undertook a world tour after the demise of the Beiyang government.

== As head of state ==
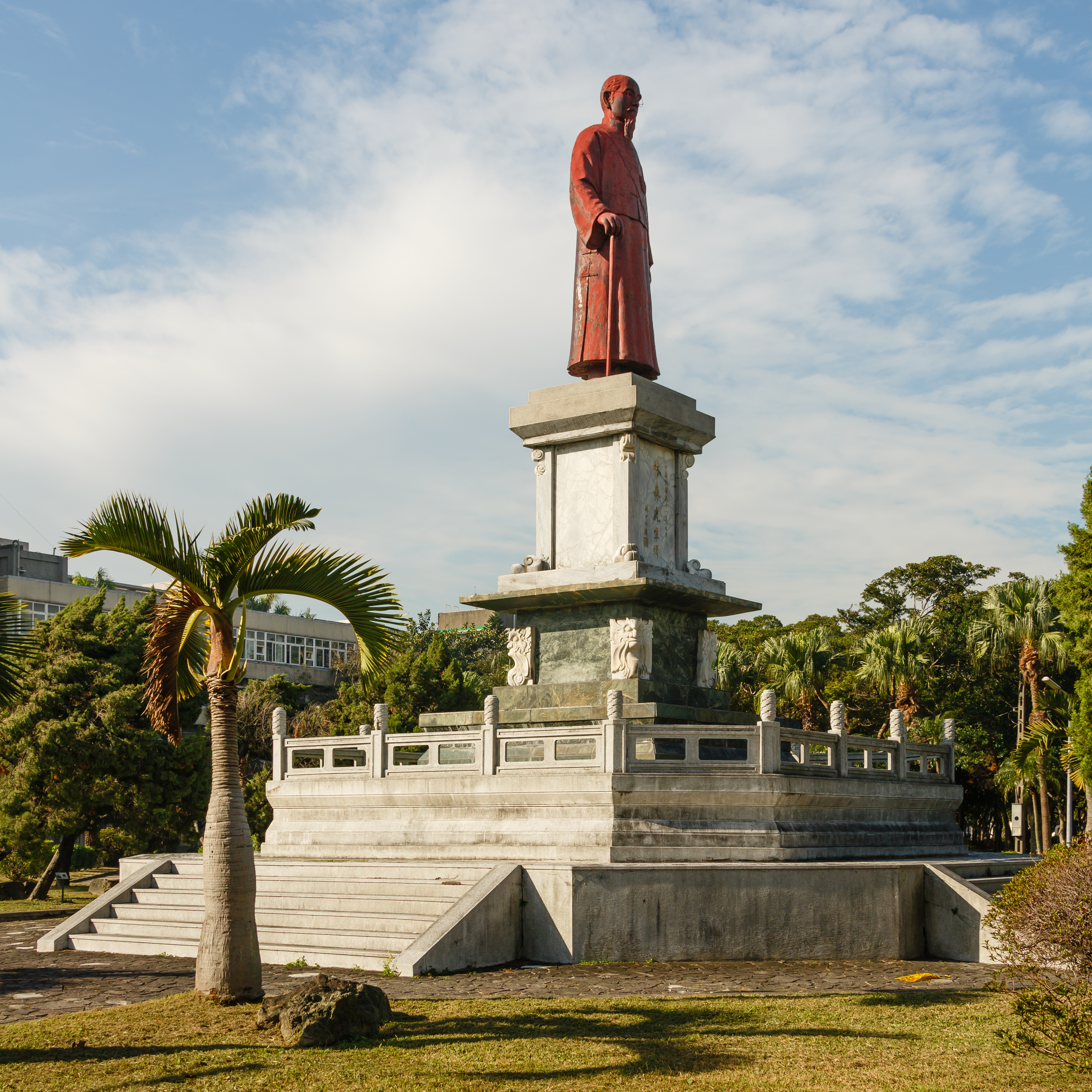
Statue of Lin Sen in Jieshou Park, Taipei

In 1931, Chairman Chiang's arrest of Hu Hanmin caused an uproar within the party and military. Lin and other high-ranking officials called for the impeachment of Chiang. The Japanese invasion of Manchuria prevented the civil war from erupting, however it did cause Chiang to resign on 15 December. Lin was appointed in his place as acting chairman and confirmed as chairman of government on 1 January 1932. He was chosen as a sign of personal respect and held few powers since the Kuomintang wanted to avoid a repeat of Chiang's rule. He never used the Presidential Palace, where Chiang continued to reside, and preferred his modest rented house near the Sun Yat-sen Mausoleum. Chiang's full influence was restored after the 1932 Battle of Shanghai as party grandees realized his necessity.

Shortly after acceding to the chairmanship, Lin Sen embarked on an extended trip that took him to the Philippines, Australia, the United States, the United Kingdom, Germany and France. He visited the Chinese diaspora and the Kuomintang party organisations in those countries. This was the first overseas visit by a serving head of state of China.

In 1934, Time magazine called him "puppet President Lin", and when there was a talk by military chief Chiang Kai-shek at a "secret conference of government leaders" of granting the President of China actual powers, it insinuated that Chiang was entertaining the thought of taking the Presidency himself, since Chiang held the actual power while Lin's position was described as "figurehead class".

Though he had little influence on public policy, Lin was highly respected by the public as an august elder statesman who was above politics. His lack of political ambition, corruption, and nepotism was an exceedingly rare trait. He lent dignity and stability to an office while other state institutions were in chaos.

A widower, Lin used his position to promote monogamy and combat concubinage which became a punishable felony in 1935. He also called for a peaceful resolution when Chiang was kidnapped during the Xi'an Incident. National unity was something he stressed as relations with Japan deteriorated further.

When the Second Sino-Japanese War entered full swing in 1937, he moved to the wartime capital of Chongqing. He legalized civilian use of guerrilla warfare, but this was merely a formality as it was already a widespread practice. He spurned all offers to defect and collaborate with the Japanese puppet government.

== Death ==
On 10 March 1943, his car was involved in an accident. Two days later, he had a stroke while meeting the Canadian delegation. As he was in hospice, he urged the recovery of Taiwan be included in the post-war settlement; it became part of the Cairo Declaration months later. He died on 1 August, aged 75, following which a month of mourning was declared. He was the longest serving head of state in the Republic of China while it still held mainland China. The central executive committee elected Chiang as chairman of government a few hours after Lin's death. All of the powers that were denied to the chairmanship were restored for Chiang.

Lin visited Qingzhi Mountain in Lianjiang, Fuzhou, Fujian, and was fascinated by it, which encouraged him to style himself "Old Man Qingzhi" (青芝老人; Qīngzhī lǎorén) in his old age. His monument, built beside Qingzhi Mountain in 1926 before his death, was damaged in the Cultural Revolution, and was restored in 1979.

== Family ==
Lin had adopted his nephew Lin Jing (known in English as K. M. James Lin), as his son. While studying as a postgraduate student in Ohio State University, James Lin married Viola Brown, a five-and-ten-cent store clerk, although he was reported already to have two wives in China. Lin Sen objected to the marriage and the couple eventually divorced. James Lin returned to China and died in action during the Japanese invasion.

== Legacy ==
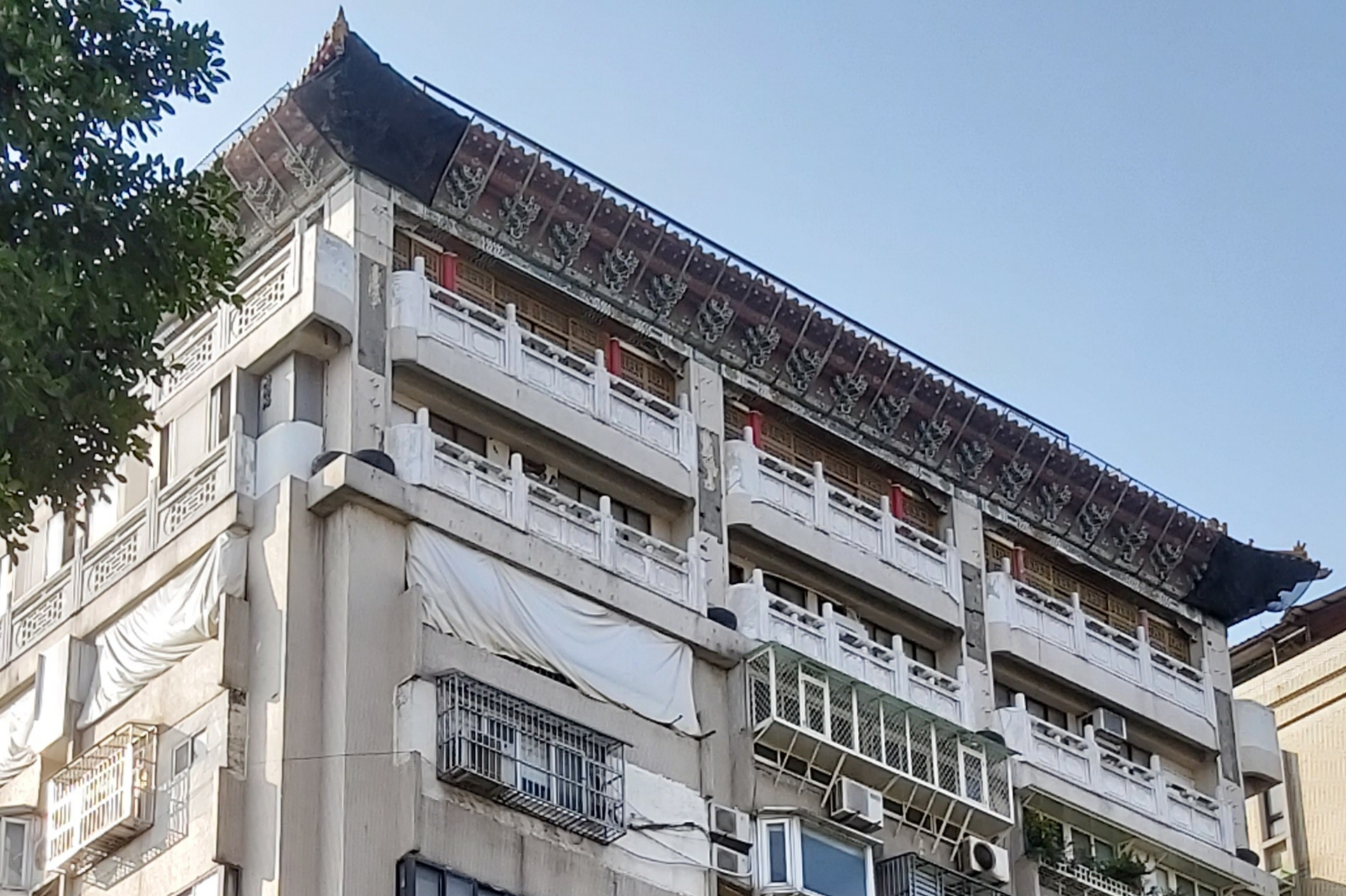
Lin Sen Memorial Hall in Taipei

There are roads named after Lin Sen in Taipei, Kaohsiung, Tainan, and other towns and cities in Taiwan due to his role in fighting the Japanese invasion of Taiwan and as ROC president. A prominent statue of Lin Sen stands on Jieshou Park in front of the Presidential Office Building, Taipei.

In the People's Republic of China, Lin was denounced for his anti-communism and roads and places named after Lin Sen were renamed, but he was later rehabilitated after the Cultural Revolution.

== See also ==
- Jieshou Park

== Notes ==
Political offices
Preceded by Chiang Kai-shek	Chairman of the National Government; 1931–1943	Succeeded by Chiang Kai-shek
