= Vice President of the Legislative Yuan =

- 立法院副院長
- Seal of the Legislative Yuan

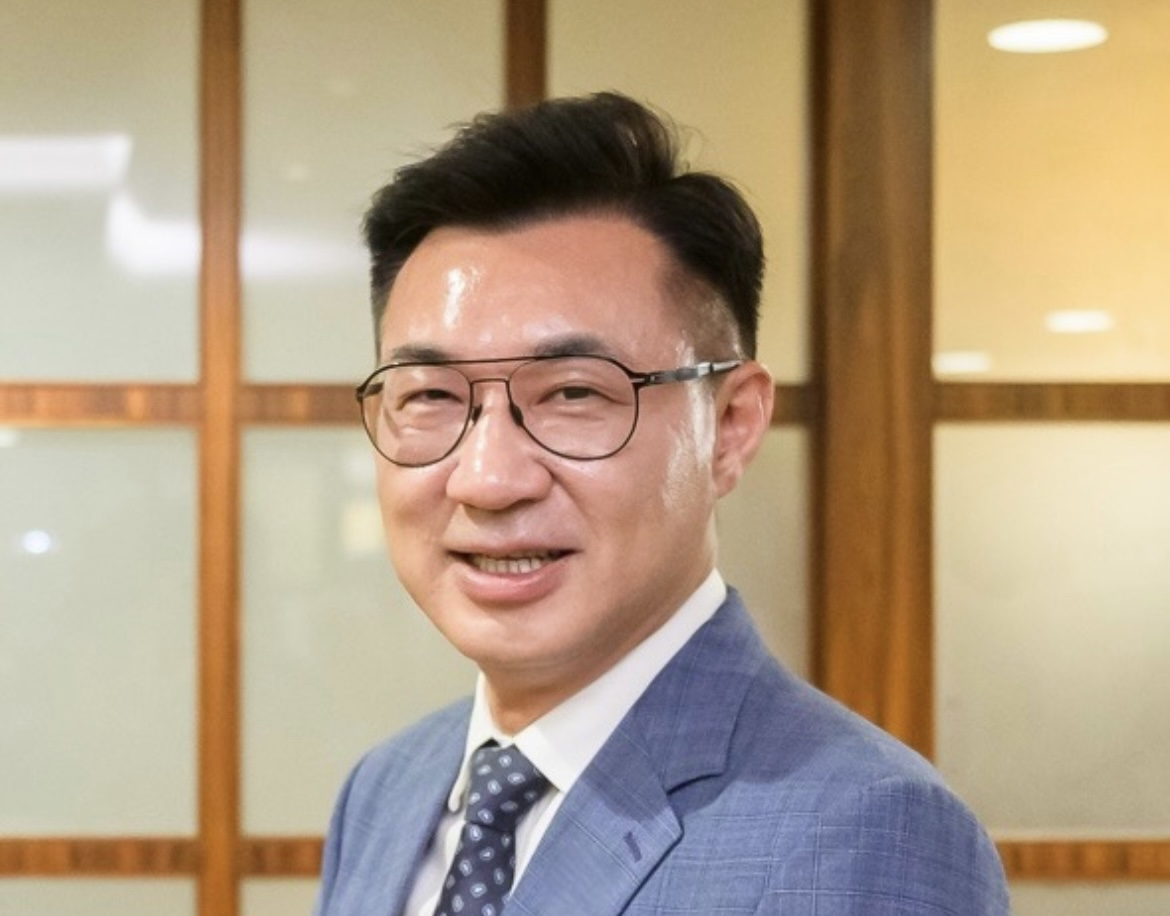
- Incumbent; Johnny Chiang since 1 February 2024
- Appointer: Legislative Yuan
- Term length: 4 years; renewable
- Formation: 13 March 1928; 98 years ago
- First holder: Lin Sen

The vice president of the Legislative Yuan (Chinese: 立法院副院長) is the deputy presiding officer of the Legislative Yuan of the Republic of China. The current Vice President is Johnny Chiang, a Kuomintang legislator representing the eighth district of Taichung.

== Election ==
The Vice President is elected by and from among all members of the Yuan in a preparatory meeting held on the first reporting day of the first session of each Legislative Yuan, and serves a term the same length as that of other members.

== Duty ==
In the absence of the President, the Vice President may preside over the Yuan Sittings and the meetings of the Committee of the Entire Yuan and is responsible for the administration of the Yuan.

== List of vice presidents ==
Kuomintang (Nationalist) People First Party Democratic Progressive Party

=== Pre-1947 Constitution ===
Name	Office	Political party
Lin Sen 林森; Lín Sēn	8 October 1928 – 2 March 1931	Kuomintang
Shao Yuanchong 邵元沖; Shào Yuánchōng	2 March 1931 – 28 December 1931	Kuomintang
Qin Zhen 覃振; Qín Zhèn	28 December 1931 – 14 May 1932	Kuomintang
Shao Yuanchong 邵元沖; Shào Yuánchōng acting	14 May 1932 – 12 January 1933	Kuomintang
Ye Chucang 葉楚傖; Yè Chǔcāng	12 January 1933 – 18 June 1948	Kuomintang
Chen Lifu 陳立夫; Chén Lìfū	18 June 1948 – 22 December 1948	Kuomintang

=== 1947 Constitution ===
The first Legislative Yuan election under the 1947 Constitution of the Republic of China was held in 1948. However, the government retreated to Taiwan in 1949. Members of the first Legislative Yuan had their terms extended indefinitely and the sessions of the first Legislative Yuan were conducted in Taiwan until December 31, 1991 while some supplementary members kept serving until January 31, 1993.

№	Portrait	Name (Birth–Death)	Took office	Left office	Term	Electoral mandates (Supplementary elections)	Political party	President
1		Chen Lifu 陳立夫; Chén Lìfū (1900–2001); MLY for Chekiang 1st District	17 May 1948	23 Dec 1948	1	1948	Kuomintang	Chiang Kai-shek (KMT)
2		Liu Chien-chun 劉健群; Liú Jiànqún (1903–1972); MLY for Kweichow 2nd District	24 Dec 1948	7 Oct 1950	1	—	Kuomintang	Chiang Kai-shek (KMT)
3		Huang Kuo-shu 黃國書; Huáng Guóshū (1905–1987); MLY for Taiwan at-large	7 Oct 1950	24 Feb 1961	1	—	Kuomintang	Chiang Kai-shek (KMT)
4		Ni Wen-ya 倪文亞; Ní Wényà (1902–2006); MLY for Chekiang 3rd District	24 Feb 1961	22 Feb 1972	1	1948, 1969	Kuomintang	Chiang Kai-shek (KMT)
5		Liu Kuo-tsai 劉闊才; Liú Kuòcái (1911–1993); MLY for Taiwan 1st District	22 Feb 1972	18 Oct 1988	1	1948, 1969, 1972; 1948, 1969, 1975; 1948, 1969, 1980; 1948, 1969, 1983; 1948, 1969, 1986	Kuomintang	Chiang Kai-shek (KMT)
5		Liu Kuo-tsai 劉闊才; Liú Kuòcái (1911–1993); MLY for Taiwan 1st District	22 Feb 1972	18 Oct 1988	1	1948, 1969, 1972; 1948, 1969, 1975; 1948, 1969, 1980; 1948, 1969, 1983; 1948, 1969, 1986	Kuomintang	Yen Chia-kan (KMT)
5		Liu Kuo-tsai 劉闊才; Liú Kuòcái (1911–1993); MLY for Taiwan 1st District	22 Feb 1972	18 Oct 1988	1	1948, 1969, 1972; 1948, 1969, 1975; 1948, 1969, 1980; 1948, 1969, 1983; 1948, 1969, 1986	Kuomintang	Chiang Ching-kuo (KMT)
5		Liu Kuo-tsai 劉闊才; Liú Kuòcái (1911–1993); MLY for Taiwan 1st District	22 Feb 1972	18 Oct 1988	1	1948, 1969, 1972; 1948, 1969, 1975; 1948, 1969, 1980; 1948, 1969, 1983; 1948, 1969, 1986	Kuomintang	Lee Teng-hui (KMT)
6		Liang Su-yung 梁肅戎 (1920–2004); Liáng Sùróng; MLY for Liaopeh at-large	18 Oct 1988	2 Dec 1990	1	1948, 1969, 1989	Kuomintang	Lee Teng-hui (KMT)
7		Liu Sung-pan 劉松藩; Liú Sōngfān (1931–2016); MLY for Taiwan 6th District	2 Dec 1990	31 Dec 1991	1	—	Kuomintang	Lee Teng-hui (KMT)
8		Shen Shih-hsiung 沈世雄; Shěn Shìxióng; MLY for Taiwan 8th District	17 Jan 1992	1 Feb 1993	1	1989	Kuomintang	Lee Teng-hui (KMT)

=== 1991 Constitution amendment ===
The Additional Articles of the Constitution promulgated in 1991 mandated the total re-election of Legislative Yuan in Taiwan.

No.	Portrait	Name (Birth–Death)	Took office	Left office	Term	Electoral mandates (Proportional vote share)	Political party	President (Government)
9		Wang Jin-pyng 王金平; Wáng Jīnpíng (1941–); MLY for Kaohsiung County	1 Feb 1993	31 Jan 1996	2	1992 53.0%	Kuomintang	Lee Teng-hui (KMT) (Majority)
9		Wang Jin-pyng 王金平; Wáng Jīnpíng (1941–); MLY for Kaohsiung County	1 Feb 1996	31 Jan 1999	3	1995 46.1%	Kuomintang	Lee Teng-hui (KMT) (Majority)
10		Yao Ying-chi 饒穎奇; Ráo Yǐngqí (1934–2026); MLY for Nationwide KMT at-large №1	1 Feb 1999	31 Jan 2002	4	1998 46.4%	Kuomintang	Lee Teng-hui (KMT) (Majority)
10		Yao Ying-chi 饒穎奇; Ráo Yǐngqí (1934–2026); MLY for Nationwide KMT at-large №1	1 Feb 1999	31 Jan 2002	4	1998 46.4%	Kuomintang	Chen Shui-bian (DPP) (Minority)
11		Chiang Pin-kung 江丙坤; Jiāng Bǐngkūn (1932–2018); MLY for Nationwide KMT at-large №2	1 Feb 2002	31 Jan 2005	5	2001 31.3% + 23.2% (Pan-Blue Coalition)	Kuomintang	Chen Shui-bian (DPP) (Minority)
12		David Chung 鍾榮吉; Zhōng Róngjí (1943–); MLY for Nationwide PFP at-large №5	1 Feb 2005	31 Jan 2008	6	2004 34.9% + 14.9% (Pan-Blue Coalition)	People First	Chen Shui-bian (DPP) (Minority)
13		Tseng Yung-chuan 曾永權; Zéng Yǒngquán (1947–); MLY for Nationwide KMT at-large №3	1 Feb 2008	31 Jan 2012	7	2008 53.5%	Kuomintang	Chen Shui-bian (DPP) (Minority)
13		Tseng Yung-chuan 曾永權; Zéng Yǒngquán (1947–); MLY for Nationwide KMT at-large №3	1 Feb 2008	31 Jan 2012	7	2008 53.5%	Kuomintang	Ma Ying-jeou (KMT) (Majority: 2008-2016) (Minority: 2016)
14		Hung Hsiu-chu 洪秀柱; Hóng Xiùzhù (1948–); MLY for Nationwide KMT at-large №6	1 Feb 2012	1 Feb 2016	8	2012 44.5%	Kuomintang	Ma Ying-jeou (KMT) (Majority: 2008-2016) (Minority: 2016)
15		Tsai Chi-chang 蔡其昌; Caì Qíchāng (1969–); MLY for Taichung 1	1 Feb 2016	1 Feb 2020	9	2016 44.1%	Democratic Progressive	Ma Ying-jeou (KMT) (Majority: 2008-2016) (Minority: 2016)
15		Tsai Chi-chang 蔡其昌; Caì Qíchāng (1969–); MLY for Taichung 1	1 Feb 2016	1 Feb 2020	9	2016 44.1%	Democratic Progressive	Tsai Ing-wen (DPP) (Majority: 2016-2024) (Minority: 2024)
15		Tsai Chi-chang 蔡其昌; Caì Qíchāng (1969–); MLY for Taichung 1	1 Feb 2020	1 Feb 2024	10	2020 34.0%	Democratic Progressive	Tsai Ing-wen (DPP) (Majority: 2016-2024) (Minority: 2024)
16		Johnny Chiang 江啟臣; Jiāng Qǐchén (1972–); MLY for Taichung 8	1 Feb 2024	Incumbent	11	2024 44.7%	Kuomintang	Tsai Ing-wen (DPP) (Majority: 2016-2024) (Minority: 2024)
16		Johnny Chiang 江啟臣; Jiāng Qǐchén (1972–); MLY for Taichung 8	1 Feb 2024	Incumbent	11	2024 44.7%	Kuomintang	Lai Ching-te (DPP) (Minority)

== See also ==
- Legislative Yuan
- President of the Legislative Yuan
- Government of the Republic of China
