= President Liu =

President Liu may refer to:

- Liu Shaoqi (1898–1969), 2nd President of the People's Republic of China under Chairman Mao Zedong
- Liu Kuo-tsai (1911–1993), Acting President of the Legislative Yuan of the Republic of China
- Liu Sung-pan (1931—2016), 9th President of the Legislative Yuan of the Republic of China

== See also ==
- Liu (surname)
