= Central Daily News =

1928–2006 official newspaper of the Kuomintang

Central Daily News 中央日報
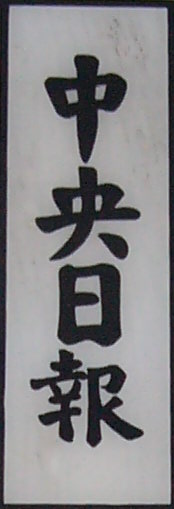
- Type: Online newspaper
- Owner: Kuomintang
- Founder(s): Kuomintang; Ku Meng-yu (the founding president)
- Founded: 1 February 1928
- Ceased publication: 1 June 2006
- Relaunched: 13 September 2006
- Language: Standard Chinese
- Headquarters: Taipei, Taiwan

Central Daily News
- Traditional Chinese: 中央日報
- Simplified Chinese: 中央日报
Transcriptions
Standard Mandarin
- Hanyu Pinyin: Zhōngyāng Rìbào

The Central Daily News was the official newspaper of the Kuomintang and is one of the world's oldest Chinese language newspapers, having been in circulation since 1928. The Kuomintang made the decision to temporarily cease publication of the newspaper effective June 1, 2006, because it could no longer subsidize the newspaper's snowballing debts, which had amounted to around NT$800 million (US$24.5 million), almost twice the overall assets of the party.

After ceasing its print operations, the Central Daily News became a dedicated online publication available to Taiwanese and Chinese readers in both Taiwan and Mainland China, written in both traditional and simplified Chinese characters. Its online operations ceased in 2018.

Relations between both sides of the Taiwan Strait were one of its most important topics, as well as business.

== History ==
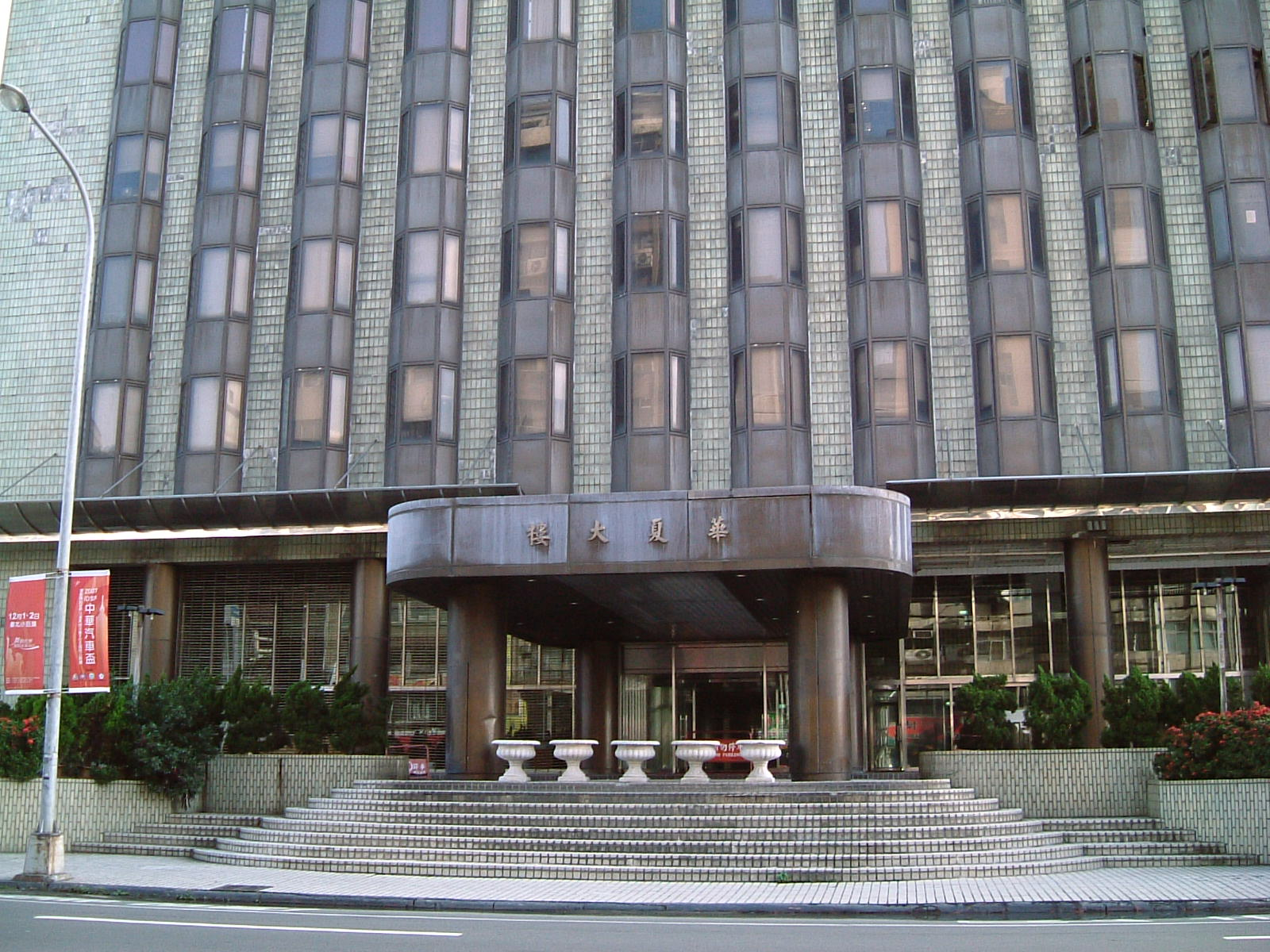
Original Central Daily News building on Bade Road in Taipei.

Central Daily News was launched in Shanghai on 1 February 1928, as a mouthpiece of the Kuomintang and began circulation in the then Chinese capital Nanking. The first editor-in-chief was Ku Meng-yu. The paper had previously temporarily ceased publication on 13 December 1937, when the capital was occupied by the Japanese military in the Second Sino-Japanese War. The paper was relocated to the temporary Chinese capital Chongqing and resumed publication on September 1, 1938, before returning to Nanjing after the war. In 1949, the paper was relocated to yet another temporary Chinese capital, Taipei on the island of Taiwan, when the Kuomintang fled mainland China during the Chinese Civil War.

In 1950, the Kuomintang, fearing sociopolitical instability and communist insurgency, began a four-decade-long authoritarian rule, beginning with the suspension of the constitution, which included a ban on the free press. During this time, the Central Daily News became the most widely read newspaper in Taiwan. However, when the ban on free press was lifted in 1987, the newspaper began facing fierce competition and, as a result of its conservative image and connection with the past Kuomintang authoritarianism, it began losing popularity.

By April 2006, the paper accumulated debts exceeding NT$800 million and was sustaining losses of NT$8.44 million each month in the same year. As part of new austerity measures implemented by Kuomintang Chairman Ma Ying-jeou, the Central Standing Committee resolved to cease publication of the paper by the end of May 2006. The paper retained a small staff of 70 to update its website.

After being shut down in June, the newspaper was reborn on September 13, 2006, as an electronic newspaper. The website was taken down during a personnel change in May 2018, but remains down to this day.

== See also ==
- Central News Agency
