= Zhang Mojun =

Chinese politician, activist, and poet (1884–1965)

- 張默君
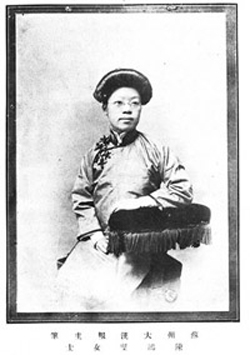
- Studio photograph of Zhang Mojun, before 1949.
- Born: October 5, 1884
- Died: 1965 (aged 80–81)
- Other names: Mojun Zhang, Zhang Zhaohan, Sophie Zhang, Luo Feiya, Zhang Mo-jiun
- Education: Wuben Girls' School, 1907 Columbia University
- Spouse: Shao Yuanchong (m. 1924; died 1936)

Zhang Mojun (張默君, born Zhang Zhaohan, October 5, 1884, in Hunan – January 1965) was a Chinese politician, women's rights activist, military commander, and poet. She was the first female member of the Kuomintang Central Committee.^{:38,}

== Biography ==
Zhang Mojun was the daughter of a Qing dynasty official, Zhang Tongdian (Bochun, Tianfang louzhu, 1859–1915), and He Chenghui (Yisheng, 1857–1941).^{:152} She was born in the Hunan province.^{:310} Her mother He Chenghui educated her in shi poetry from an early age, and she began writing early.^{:152} Her father was politically active, and, like his daughter, would become an early member of the Tongmenghui (Revolutionary Alliance).^{:153}

She opposed foot binding at an early age, using the example of female bodhisattvas with unbound feet as a Buddhist rationale against the practice. She married Shao Yuanchong, Sun Yat-Sen's secretary, in 1924, when she was forty-one. The couple would have two children, Shao Fuyi and Shao Yingduo.

== Career ==
=== Author, poet, editor ===
Zhang Mojun wrote classical poems, essays, commentaries, and published translations. Her poems often express her revolutionary fervor and gendered ideas. In "Colophon for My Own Painting A Beauty Inspecting a Sword while Leaning on a Horse," Zhang Mojun declares, "Today many men are lowly characters immersed in achieving their own fame and unconcerned with the national interest," unlike the woman in her painting, whose "pure courage in her heart" is an inspiration to the author-artist.^{:111} In 1917, a trip with Chen Hongbi, Lü Bicheng, and Tang Peilan, occasioned her to write a poem on the strength of women's friendship.^{:113}

Zhang Mojun joined the South Society, a revolutionary poetry society established in 1909 that opposed the Manchu government; she was the two-hundredth member.^{:109} She published poems in and served as an editor of the Chinese women's magazine Funü shibao.

She practiced calligraphy in the zhangcao (章草) style. Yu Youren praised her work: "Heart and hand are as one, the ink penetrating deep into the paper, the brush-tip guiding and pacifying the ink. A comparable to any other; I never tire of viewing it."

She painted in various media and created oil paintings that were publicly exhibited in 1910.^{:149} She also took photographs that were published in many of the magazines she wrote and edited.^{:276} Her involvement with media has been described as central to her political work.

=== Political activism ===
==== Revolutionary work ====
She organized the Shanghai Women's Northern Expedition Dare-to-die Company (Shanghai nüzi beifajun gansidui, 上海女子北伐軍敢死隊), a women's army that fought in the uprisings of the 1910s. There were over seventy students enrolled.^{:50}

She was a founder and leader of the Shenzhou Women's Assistance Society (also Shenzhou United Women's Assistance Society), a group dedicated to gender equality that was established in 1912. Zhang Mojun founded the associated yet short-lived Shenzhou Women's Journal (1912–1913), which criticized the regime of Yuan Shikai.^{:42} The group's political views were reformist and it encouraged gradual change, while arguing that women's suffrage was inevitable in the twentieth century.^{:77} She reminded Sun-Yat Sen of women's participation in the revolution, which demonstrated their patriotism and thus, their qualifications for suffrage.^{:78}

She was an early member of the Tongmenghui (Revolutionary Alliance).^{:153} In 1911, Zhang Mojun and her father were responsible for Suzhou declaring its independence from the Qing Dynasty.

==== Kuomintang ====
In 1912, Zhang Mojun headed the publications section of the Communications Department of the Kuomintang.

While in Europe, she protested the Chinese signing of the Treaty of Versailles in May 1919. She returned to China in 1920. During the 1930s and 1940s, Zhang Mojun held positions in the Legislative and Examination Yuans and was elected to the Kuomintang Central Committee. She argued for the establishment of the Chinese Navy, earning her the nickname "Mother of China's Navy."

=== Educational work ===
Zhang Mojun founded the Shenzhou Girls' School in 1912, with funding received from Sun Yat-Sen.^{:151,: 78} She believed that women should be educated in scientific and business endeavors, including sericulture, photography, and banking.^{:55} Domestic work was to be taught with formal and scientific rigor: household chemistry, basic medical care, and household industry were to accompany courses on gardening, sewing, and cooking.^{:169} It also included art education in both Chinese and western traditions.

In 1918, she was sent to Europe and America by the Ministry of Education to research women's educational opportunities.^{:151} While in America, she enrolled at Columbia University and was elected president of the New York Students' Association. Upon her return to China, she served in various roles as an education specialist in the government, including as a member of the Kuomintang Higher Examination Standards Committee (1929).

=== Later life ===
She moved to Taiwan in 1948 and continued to work for the Kuomintang including as a member of the Central Control Committee. She died in 1965 at age eighty-two.
