= Ni Wen-ya =

Taiwanese politician (1902–2006)

Ni Wen-ya MLY
- 倪文亞
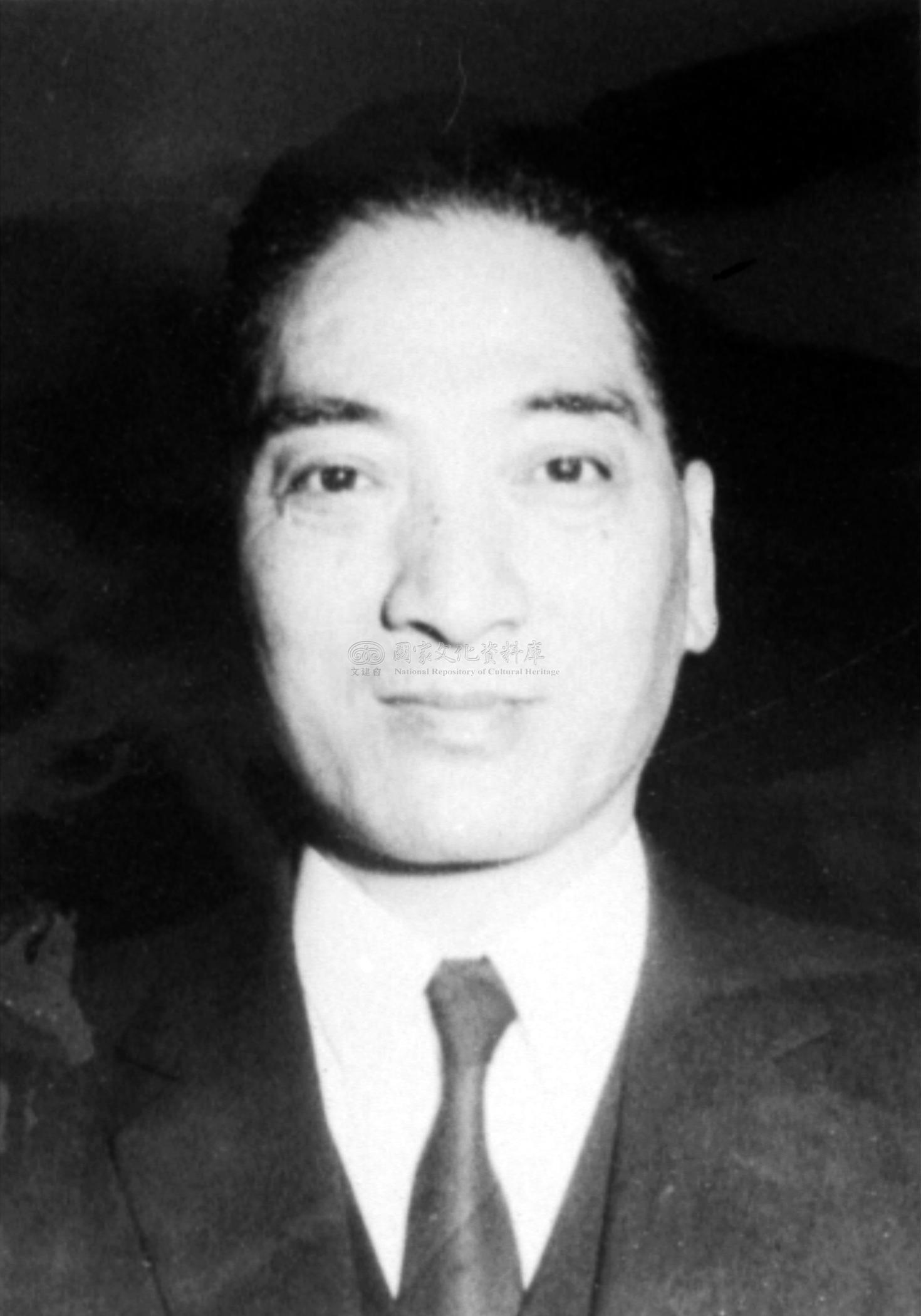

6th President of the Legislative Yuan
- In office 22 February 1972 – 28 April 1972
- Vice President: Liu Kuo-tsai
- Preceded by: Huang Kuo-shu
- Succeeded by: himself
- In office 2 May 1972 – 18 October 1988
- Preceded by: himself (acting)
- Succeeded by: Liu Kuo-tsai

Vice President of the Legislative Yuan
- In office 24 February 1961 – 22 February 1972
- President: Huang Kuo-shu
- Preceded by: Huang Kuo-shu
- Succeeded by: Liu Kuo-tsai

Member of the Legislative Yuan
- In office 18 May 1948 – 20 December 1988
- Constituency: Zhejiang 3rd

Member of the National Assembly
- In office 1946–1948

Personal details
- Born: 2 March 1902 Yueqing, Qing Dynasty
- Died: 3 June 2006 (aged 104) Taipei, Taiwan
- Party: Kuomintang
- Spouse(s): Li Yun-chiu (m. 1930; died 1967) Shirley Kuo (m. 1968)
- Children: 5
- Education: East China Normal University (BA); Columbia University (MEd)

Ni Wen-ya (Chinese: 倪文亞; pinyin: Ní Wényà; 2 March 1902 – 3 June 2006) was a Chinese educator and politician who served as 6th President of the Legislative Yuan under 4 presidential administration from 1972 to 1988. He was a member of Tsotanhui Clique within Kuomintang.During the 1930s, Ni served as Training Director within the Blue Shirts Society, a secretive faction of the Kuomintang. Alongside Ho Chung-han, Liu Chien-chun, and Kang Tse, he played a leading role in guiding the organization among cultural field. Ni was specifically responsible for recruiting university professors and engaging with newspapers to promote the Society's ideological agenda.

== Biography ==
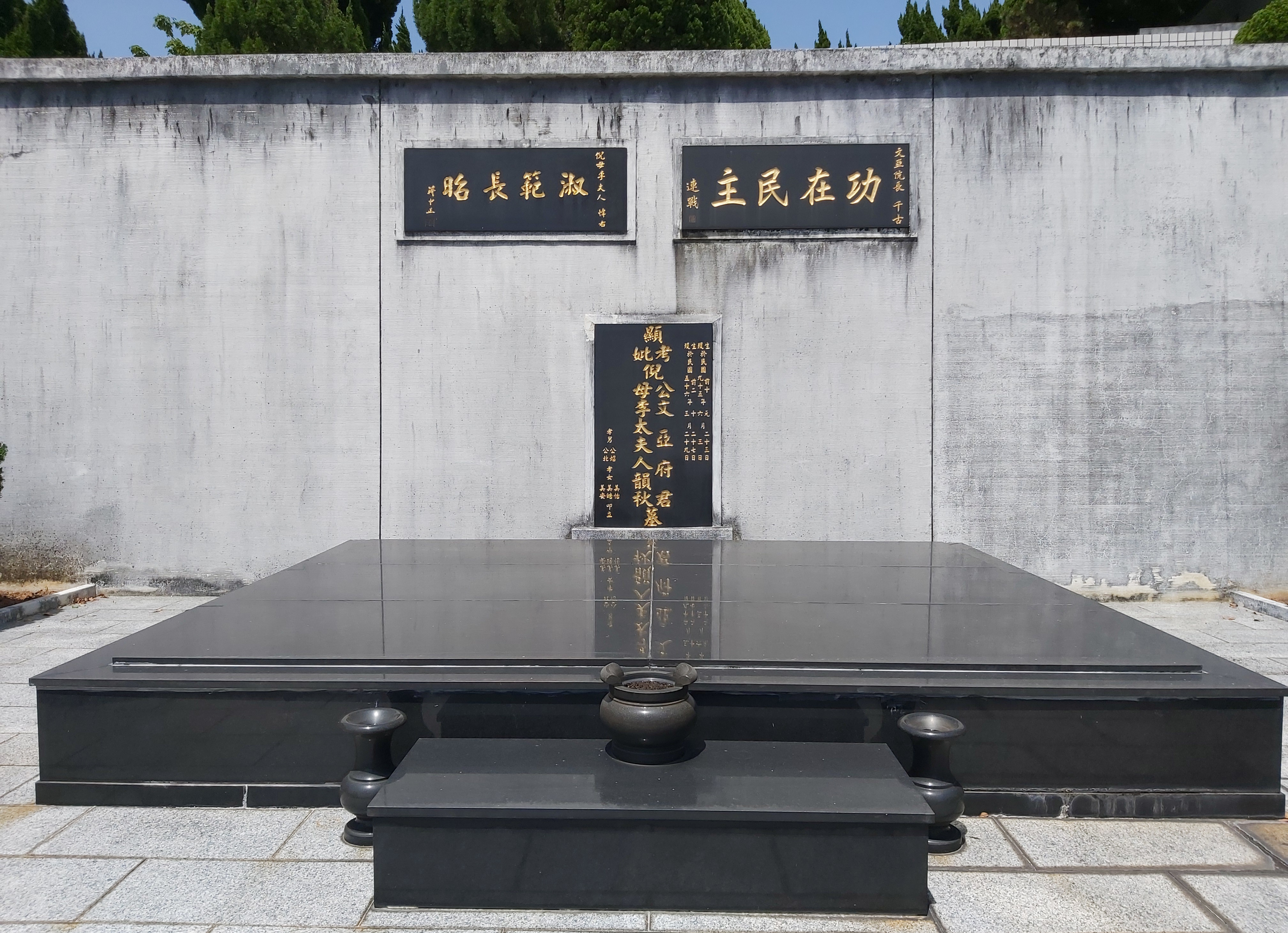
Grave of Ni Wen-ya

Ni was born in Yueqing, Zhejiang, Qing China. After graduating from East China Normal University (then known as China Great University), he earned a master's degree from Teachers College, Columbia University, in the United States and taught at Great China University.

Ni was elected to represent Zhejiang in the parliament through the 1947 legislative elections. Ni served as Vice President of the Legislative Yuan, before replacing Huang Kuo-shu in the top leadership position as Huang had resigned for health reasons. Ni was replaced as President of the Yuan by Liu Kuo-tsai in October 1988 when he first attempted to resign, but did not relinquish his legislative seat until December 1988, when his resignation was approved.

After Ni Wen-ya's death in 2006, he was buried together with his first wife, Li Yun-chiu, who had died 39 years earlier. The elegiac couplet for his wife was inscribed by Chiang Kai-shek with the phrase "Shu Fan Chang Zhao" (淑範長昭, "Her virtuous example shines long"), while Ni's own elegiac couplet was inscribed by Lien Chan with the phrase "Gong Zai Minzhu" (功在民主, "Meritorious in democracy").

== Personal life ==
Ni was married to Shirley Kuo.

In 2005, at the age of 103, Ni Wen-ya was reported by TVBS to have privately divorced his second wife, Shirley Kuo, then aged 75. The report was publicly denied by Kuo's daughter with her former husband, legislator Christina Liu.

Ni died on 3 June 2006 at Cathay General Hospital in Taipei, Taiwan.
