= Liang Su-yung =

Taiwanese politician

Liang Su-yung MLY
- 梁肅戎
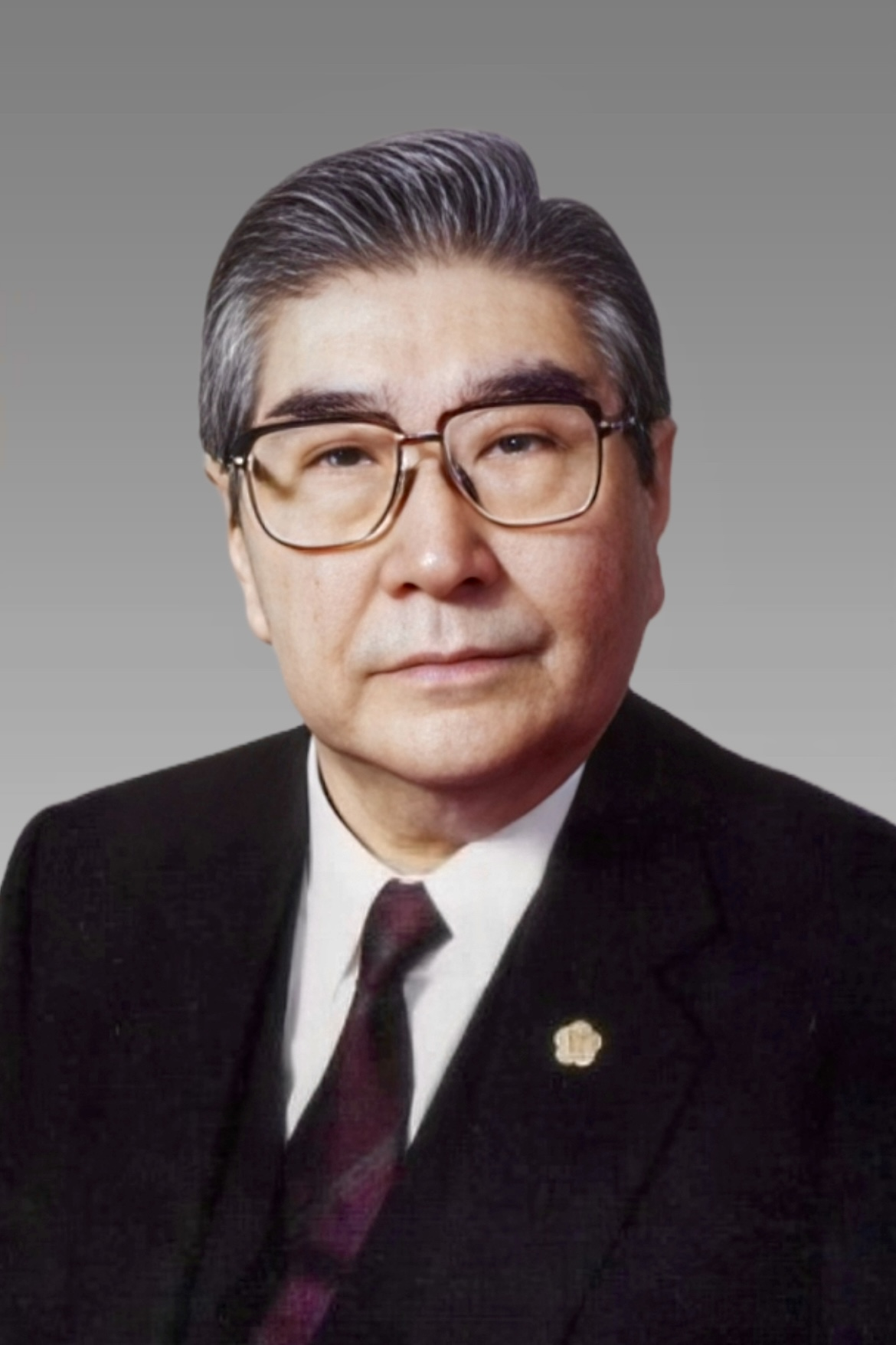
- Official portrait, 1990

8th President of the Legislative Yuan
- In office 27 February 1990 – 31 December 1991; Acting: 12 December 1990 — 27 February 1990
- Vice President: Liu Sung-pan
- Preceded by: Liu Kwo-tsai
- Succeeded by: Liu Sung-pan

6th Vice President of the Legislative Yuan
- In office 20 December 1988 – 12 February 1990
- President: Liu Kwo-tsai
- Preceded by: Liu Kwo-tsai
- Succeeded by: Liu Sung-pan

Member of the Legislative Yuan
- In office 18 May 1948 – 31 December 1991
- Constituency: Liaopeh

Personal details
- Born: 8 August 1920 Changtu County, Liaoning, Republic of China
- Died: 27 August 2004 (aged 84) Taipei, Taiwan
- Party: Kuomintang
- Education: National Changchun University (LLB); Meiji University (LLM, SJD)

Liang Su-yung (Chinese: 梁肅戎; pinyin: Liáng Sùróng; 8 August 1920 – 27 August 2004) was a Chinese lawyer, intelligence and politician with CC Clique membership who served in the first Legislative Yuan from 1948 to 1991. He was elevated to vice president of the parliament in 1988, and retired in 1991 as its leader. Prior to his political career, he worked as a human rights lawyer.

Liang was a member of CC Clique, he was also regarded as the last leader of the CC Clique.

== Life and career ==
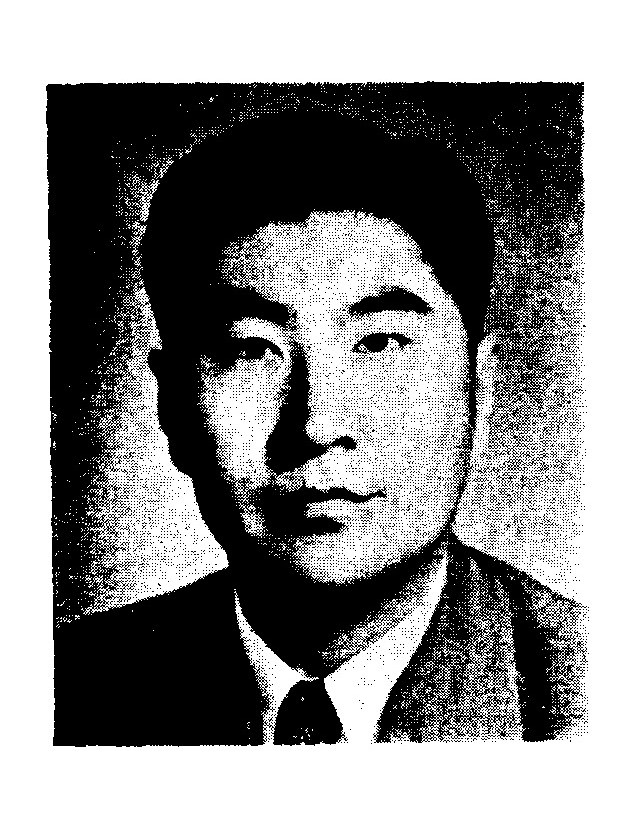
Liang in 1953, as a member of the Legislative Yuan

Born in Changtu County in 1920, Liang graduated from National Changchun University with a Bachelor of Laws and earned his Legum Doctor and Doctor of Juridical Science (S.J.D.) from Japan's Meiji University, after having studied at Changchun Law and Political University. In 1941, he became a prosecutor in Changchun.

In 1939, he was recruited by 羅大愚 into the underground Northeast anti-Japanese intelligence network then led by Chi Shi-ying and Lo Ta-yu, further expanding his involvement in clandestine resistance activities, feeding information within the Japanese-occupied territory to Chongqing, the provincial capital of Chiang Kai-shek's Nationalist government. Liang was arrested and taken as a Japanese prisoner of war in 1944. He was released upon Japanese surrender in 1945. The experience left a tremendous impression on Liang, who would make the cause of human rights a motif of his life's work. Liang was elected as a legislator for his home province of Liaoning in 1948 as hostilities between Kuomintang and Chinese Communist Party forces resumed following the Japanese surrender. Liang followed Chiang to Taiwan after the KMT were driven off the mainland completely in 1949.

Under martial law in Taiwan, Liang gained a reputation as a fierce defender of human rights and advocated non-violence with regards to the protest movement, in contrast to the more militarist wing of the KMT.

In 1960, at the request of his tutor and China Democratic Party co-founder Chi Shi-ying, to defense Lei Chen, who was charged with sedition for criticizing Chiang's regime in court. Liang's defense of Lei angered Chiang, who strongly considered Liang's expulsion from the Kuomintang. Despite this threat, Liang later defended Peng Ming-min, who stood accused of the same charges in 1964.

After Chiang's death in 1975, Liang worked as a troubleshooter for the better part of a decade between Chiang's son, Chiang Ching-kuo, and the Tangwai movement as the government began to relax some controls on free speech and political dissent. Liang also took credit for persuading Chiang Ching-kuo to handle protests in a peaceful manner. Liang was one of the founding members of the National Unification Council formed in 1990.

In 1988, Liang Was elected as Vice President of the Legislative Yuan after defeating the Tsotanhui Clique-backed hardline candidate Chao Tzu-chi, elected as president two years later.

He was involved in a fight on the floor of the parliament that same year. It began when Democratic Progressive Party legislator Chang Chun-hsiung hit Liang in the face, causing Liang to respond in kind. Liang was also injured by a glass thrown by Ju Gau-jeng.

In addition to his position as a legislator, Liang was also a senior advisor to President Lee Teng-hui.

After his retirement from politics, Liang became president of the Straits Peaceful Reunification Association. Personally, he continually pushed for Chinese unification, opposed Lee's policy of Taiwanization, and repeatedly attempted to expel Lee from the Kuomintang.

Liang died of anaphylactic shock caused by pneumonia at Cathay General Hospital in Taipei on 27 August 2004, at the age of 84.
