= Tung Kuan-hsien =

Taiwanese politician

Tung Kuan-hsien was an Taiwanese politician from Hebei who served as 2nd President of the Legislative Yuan from December 24, 1948 to October 1949. He was born in 1894 and died in 1981.
