= Shao Yuanchong =

Founding member of the Xinhai Revolution and a politician of the Republic of China

Shao Yuanchong 邵元冲
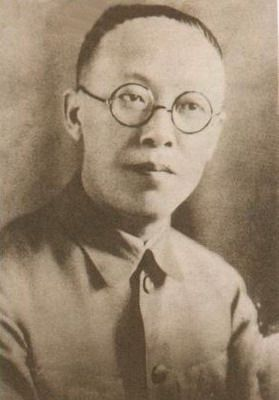

Vice President of the Legislative Yuan
- In office 3 March 1931 – 28 December 1931
- Preceded by: Hu Hanmin
- Succeeded by: Ye Chucang
- In office 14 May 1932 – 12 January 1933
- Preceded by: Qin Zhen
- Succeeded by: Sun Fo

Personal details
- Born: 1890 Shaoxing Prefecture, Shanyin County, Zhejiang Province, Qing Empire
- Died: 14 December 1936 (aged 46) Xi'an, Shaanxi Province, Republic of China
- Party: Kuomintang
- Spouse(s): Zhang Mojun, 1924–1936
- Profession: Politician, Revolutionary

Shao Yuanchong (Chinese: 邵元沖; pinyin: Shào Yuánchōng; 1890 – 14 December 1936) was a founding member of the Xinhai Revolution and a politician of the Republic of China. He served as the vice president of the Legislative Yuan and the mayor of Hangzhou and was one of the authors of the National Anthem of the Republic of China. He died from wounds sustained during the Xi'an incident while trying to escape.
