= Liu Chien-chun =

Chinese politician

- 劉健群
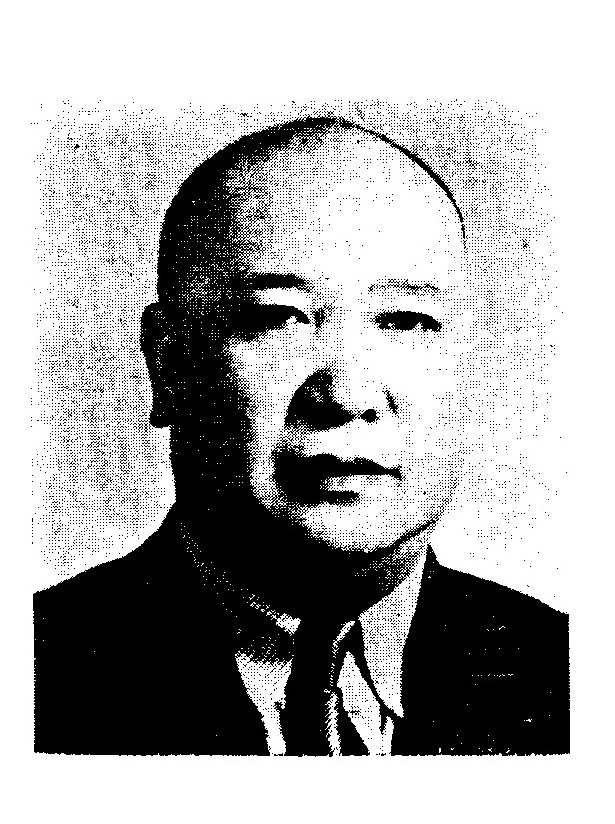

3rd President of the Legislative Yuan
- In office October 19, 1949 – October 19, 1951
- Preceded by: Tung Kuan-hsien
- Succeeded by: Huang Kuo-shu (acting); Chang Tao-fan (official)

Personal details
- Born: 1902
- Died: March 17, 1972 (aged 69–70)
- Party: Kuomintang

Liu Chien-chun (1902 – March 17, 1972) was a Chinese politician who served as the third President of the Legislative Yuan of the Republic of China from 1949 to 1951. He was a member of the Tsotanhui Clique within the Kuomintang and a co-founder of the Blue Shirts Society. Liu was known for his sympathy toward fascism.
