= Sun Fo =

Chinese politician (1891–1973)

- 孫科
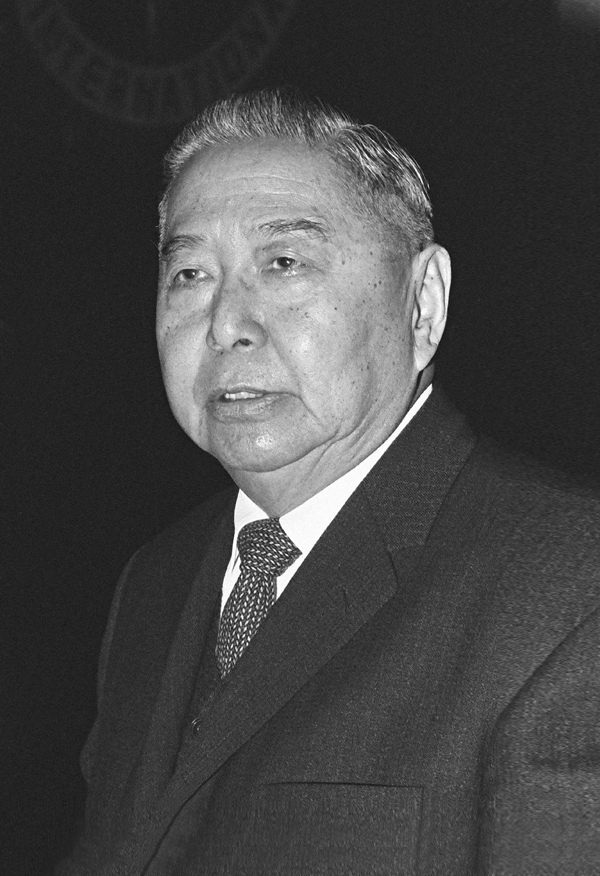

Premier of China
- In office 26 November 1948 – 12 March 1949
- President: Chiang Kai-shek
- Vice Premier: Chang Li-sheng; Wu Tiecheng
- Preceded by: Weng Wenhao
- Succeeded by: He Yingqin
- In office 1 January 1932 – 28 January 1932
- President: Lin Sen
- Vice Premier: T. V. Soong
- Preceded by: Chen Mingshu (acting)
- Succeeded by: Wang Jingwei

Minister of Communications
- In office 1926 – 1927
- Premier: Wellington Koo
- Succeeded by: Wang Boqun

Minister of Finance
- In office 1928
- Premier: Pan Fu; Tan Yankai
- Succeeded by: T. V. Soong

Minister of Railways
- In office 1928 – 1931
- Premier: Tan Yankai; T.V. Soong (acting); Chiang Kai-shek
- Preceded by: None
- Succeeded by: Wang Jingwei

President of the Legislative Yuan
- In office 29 January 1932 – 24 December 1948
- Preceded by: Shao Yuanchong (acting)
- Succeeded by: Tung Kuan-hsien

President of the Examination Yuan
- In office 1 September 1966 – 13 September 1973
- Preceded by: Mo Teh-hui
- Succeeded by: Yang Liang-kung

Personal details
- Born: 21 October 1891 Xiangshan, Guangdong, Qing dynasty
- Died: 13 September 1973 (aged 81) Taipei, Taiwan
- Party: Kuomintang
- Spouse: Chen Suk-ying (1893–1990)
- Children: Sun Tse-ping (孫治平); Sun Tse-kiong (孫治強); Sun Sui-ying (孫穗英); Sun Sui-hwa (孫穗華); Sun Sui-fong (孫穗芳); Nora Sun (孫穗芬)
- Parent(s): Sun Yat-sen (father); Lu Muzhen (mother)
- Education: University of California, Berkeley (BA); Columbia University (MS)

Sun Fo (Chinese: 孫科; pinyin: Sūn Kē; Jyutping: Syun1 Fo1; 21 October 1891 – 13 September 1973), courtesy name Zhesheng (哲生), was a Chinese politician and high-ranking official in the government of the Republic of China. He was the son of Sun Yat-sen, the founder of the Republic of China, and his first wife Lu Muzhen. He was considered the leader of the liberal wing of the Kuomintang.

== Biography ==
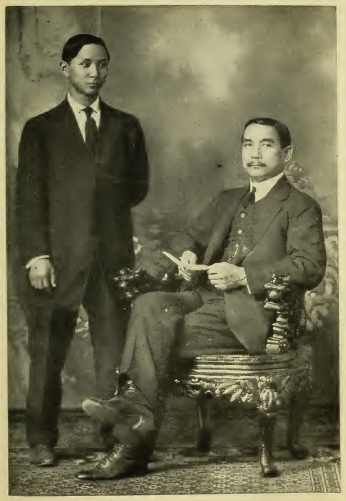
Sun Fo (left) and Sun Yat-sen in 1911

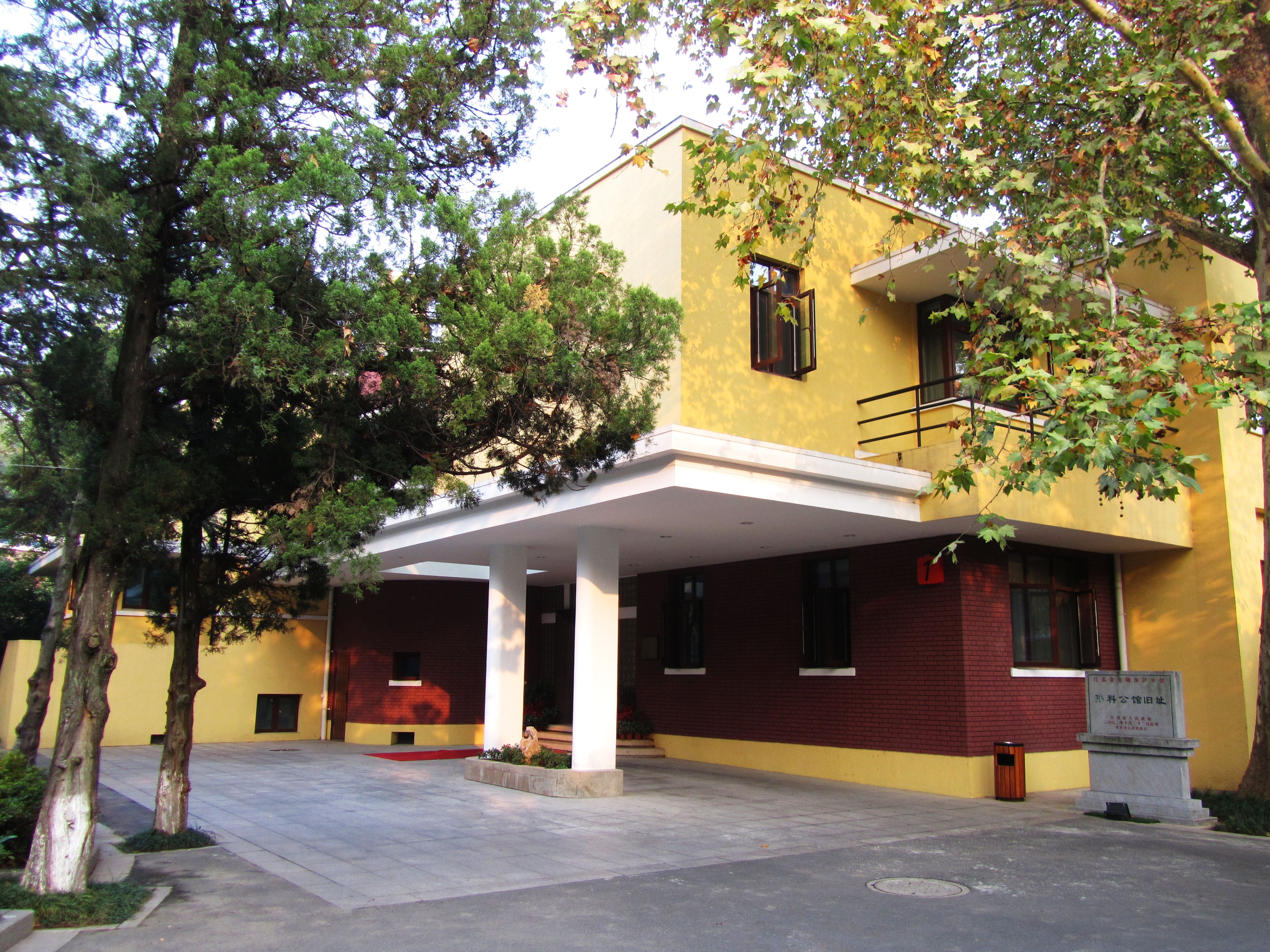
Former residence of Sun Fo in Nanjing.

Sun was born in Xiangshan (now Zhongshan), Guangdong, Qing dynasty. He studied abroad, graduated in 1911 from Saint Louis College (now Saint Louis School, K-12, Honolulu, Hawaii), earned a Bachelor of Arts from the University of California, Berkeley in 1916 and a Master of Science from Columbia University in 1917. He also received an honorary LL.D. from Columbia. He married Chen Suk-ying and had two sons (Sun Tse-ping and Sun Tse-kiong) and two daughters (Sun Sui-ying and Sun Sui-hwa). He had two more daughters; Sun Sui-fong with Yan Ai-juang, and Sun Sui-fen with Lan Yi. Most of his children, including daughters, went on to have successful careers in public.

After returning to China, Sun was appointed Mayor of Guangzhou (Canton), where the Kuomintang's government headed by his father was headquartered, serving from 1920 to 1922 and again from 1923 to 1925 (between 1922 and 1923, Sun Yat-sen was exiled by Chen Jiongming). As recorded in a China Mail (a Chinese newspaper) on 4 June 1923, there was controversy in relation to a case involving 50,000 yuan and Sun Fo. The case was voiced in public through Chan Po-yin (陳步賢; 1883–1965), a Senator of Guangzhou. In the Nationalist government, Sun served as Minister of Communications from 1926 to 1927, as Minister of Finance from 1927 to 1928 and Minister of Railways from 1928 to 1931.

In 1928, he became President of Chiao Tung University in Shanghai, and made many administrative and educational reforms, including introducing a Moral Education Department. He created the Science College, which incorporated three departments (Mathematics, Physics, and Chemistry).

In 1931, the near civil war caused by the arrest of Hu Hanmin and the invasion of Manchuria forced Chiang Kai-shek to resign. For one month, he was President of the Executive Yuan (Premier). He found the government was paralyzed by the absence of the party's Big Three: Hu, Chiang, and Wang Jingwei. High level negotiations brought the latter two back into politics with Wang becoming premier.

Sun disagreed with Chiang extensively on their objectives, Sun desired to put off war against the Chinese Communist Party (CCP) in favor of war against Japan, and reach an agreement with the CCP.

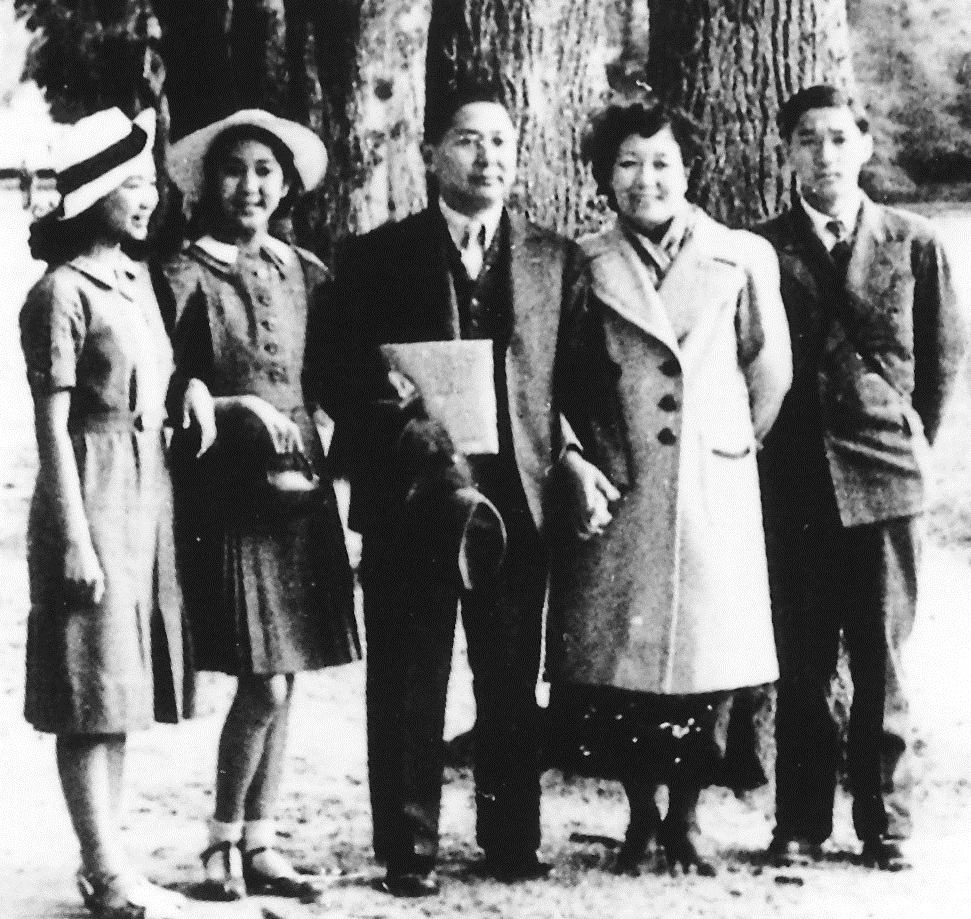
Sun Fo (center) with his family during a diplomatic mission in France in 1938. Pictured from left to right are daughters Sun Sui-ying and Sun Sui-hwa, Sun Fo, his wife Chen Suk-ying, and younger son Sun Tse-kiong. Eldest son, Sun Tse-ping, not pictured, was then living and working in the U.S.A.

Sun became President of the Legislative Yuan from 1932 to 1948 (the first to head the Legislative Yuan under the 1947 Chinese Constitution, which he helped frame). From 1947 to 1948 he was Vice Chairman of the Nationalist Government and he served again as President of the Executive Yuan from 1948. During this time, he gained the reputation of having an "iron neck" —an outspoken liberal against Chiang Kai-shek's authoritarian tendencies, he could not be purged because he was the son of Sun Yat-sen. In the first election for president and vice president under the new Constitution in 1948, Sun stood for the vice presidency against Li Zongren and Cheng Chien. Despite his previous veiled criticisms of Chiang, Sun remained the favored choice of Chiang, but Li (one of Chiang's rivals in the Kuomintang) won the election.

He was a member of the Kuomintang Central Executive Committee from 1926 to 1950. Leading the left wing of the Kuomintang, he advocated cooperation with the CCP in the fight against the Japanese military occupation of 1931–1945, and represented his party in negotiations with Zhou Enlai.

Following the full-scale Japanese invasion of 1937, Sun Fo was tasked with obtaining military assistance from the Allied Powers. Turned down by the U.S., Britain, and France, he turned to the Soviet Union. In direct talks with Joseph Stalin in 1937, 1938, and 1939, he secured the crucial arms and ammunition that prevented the total defeat of Nationalist forces. But while Chiang Kai-shek wanted the arms primarily to fight the CCP, Sun Fo insisted that the threat to China's national integrity came foremost from the invading outside forces.

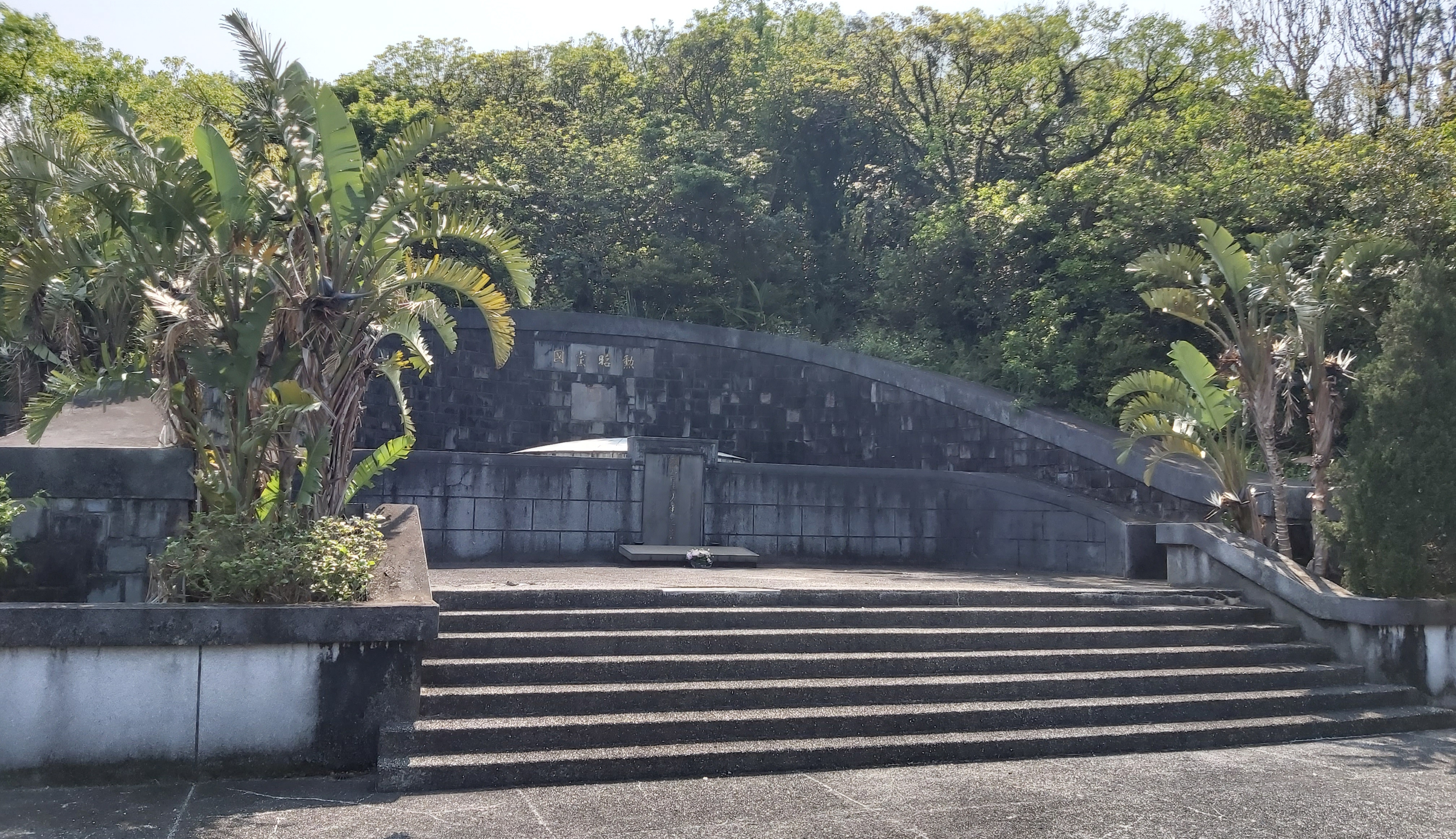
Tomb of Sun Zhesheng

At the end of the Chinese Civil War in 1949, he exiled himself to Hong Kong until 1951, and moved to Europe (stops in Paris and Spain) from 1951 to 1952, and finally resided in the United States (Los Angeles) from 1952 to 1965.

After years of political differences with Chiang Kai-shek, Sun Fo returned to serve in the government of the Republic of China in Taipei as a senior advisor to President Chiang from 1965, and as President of the Examination Yuan from 1966 until his death in 1973. He was also Chairman of the Board of Trustees of Soochow University in Taiwan from 1966 to 1973.

Sun Fo and his wife are buried at Yangmingshan Private Cemetery, in the Beitou District, Taipei, Taiwan.

Government offices
| Preceded by Chen Mingshu | Premier of China; 1931–1932 | Succeeded by Wang Jingwei |
| Preceded by Shao Yuanchong | President of the Legislative Yuan; 1932–1948 | Succeeded by Tung Kuan-hsien |
| Preceded by Wong Wen-hao | Premier of China; 1948–1949 | Succeeded by He Yingqin |
| Preceded by Mo Teh-hui | President of Examination Yuan; 1966–1973 | Succeeded by Yang Liang-kung |
