= Liu Kuo-tsai =

Taiwanese politician (1911–1993)

- 劉闊才
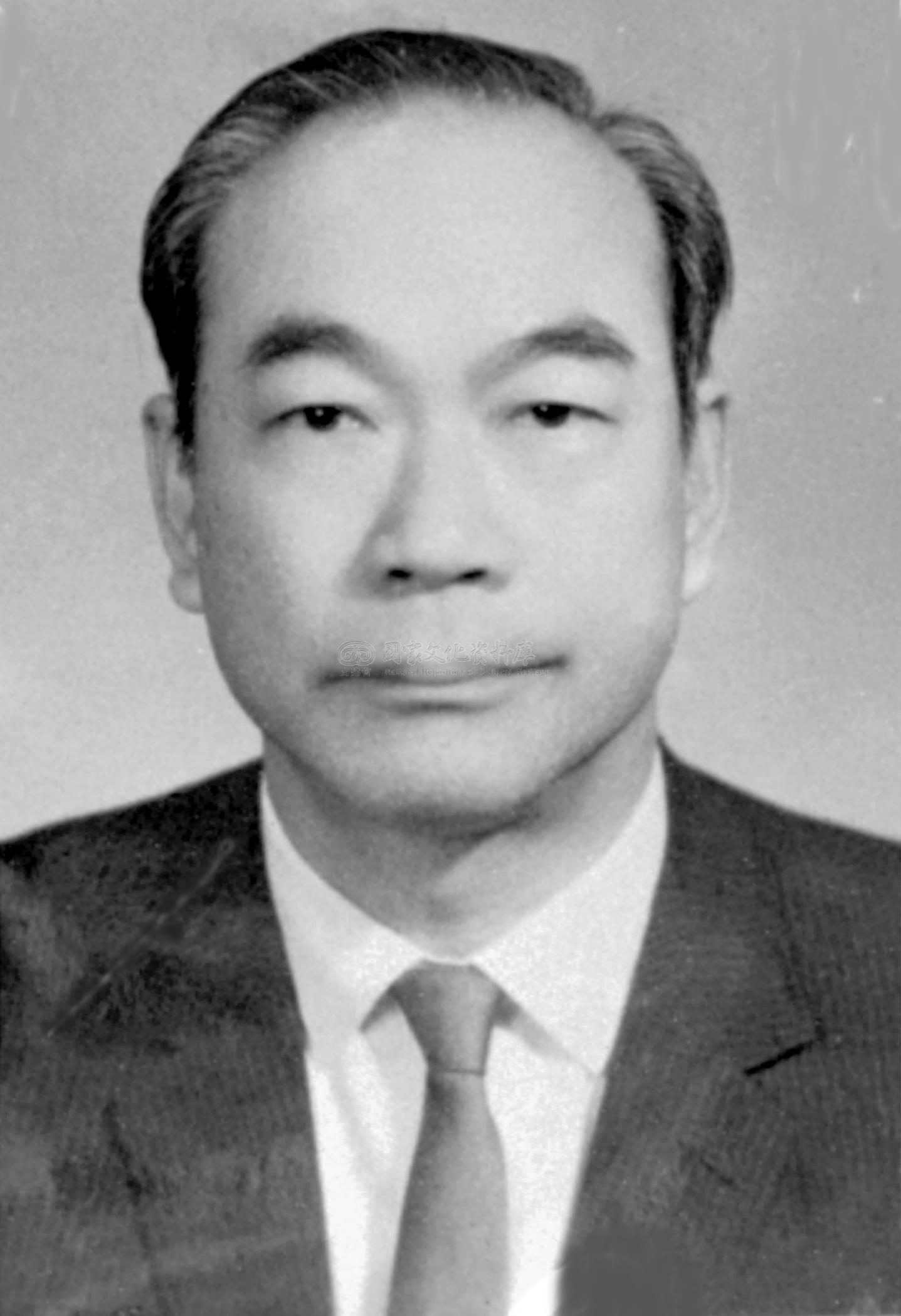

President of the Legislative Yuan acting until 24 February 1989
- In office 18 October 1988 – 2 December 1990
- Vice President: Liang Su-yung
- Preceded by: Ni Wen-ya
- Succeeded by: Liang Su-yung

Vice President of the Legislative Yuan
- In office 22 February 1972 – 18 October 1988
- President: Ni Wen-ya
- Preceded by: Ni Wen-ya
- Succeeded by: Liang Su-yung

Member of the Legislative Yuan
- In office 1 February 1970 – 2 December 1990
- Constituency: Taiwan 1st

Personal details
- Born: 1911 Shinchiku Prefecture, Taiwan, Empire of Japan (today Miaoli County, Taiwan)
- Died: 1993 (aged 81–82)
- Party: Kuomintang
- Education: Kyoto Imperial University; Kansai University

Liu Kuo-tsai (Chinese: 劉闊才; pinyin: Liú Kuòcái; 1911–1993) was a Taiwanese politician. Elected to the Legislative Yuan in 1969, he was named deputy speaker in 1972. In 1988, he became the acting President of the Legislative Yuan. The interim designation was removed early next year and Liu stepped down from the position in 1990.

== Political career ==
Born in Miaoli, Taiwan in 1911, Liu graduated from Kyoto Imperial University before studying law at Kwansei Gakuin University, both in Japan. He was first elected to the Legislative Yuan in 1969. On 5 May 1972, Liu was sworn in as Vice President of the Legislative Yuan. Ni Wen-ya was elected speaker. He served three terms in that position before running for President of the Legislative Yuan in 1989. By 1990, Liu was a senior adviser to President Lee Teng-hui and in October, became a founding member of the National Unification Council.

On 12 February 1990, Liu announced his resignation from the Legislative Yuan. Liu died in 1993 due to cardiac arrest stemming from ventricular fibrillation.
