= Huang Kuo-shu (born 1905) =

Taiwanese politician (1905–1987)

- 黃國書

President of the Legislative Yuan
- In office 28 February 1961 – 19 February 1972
- President: Chiang Kai-shek
- Preceded by: Chang Tao-fan
- Succeeded by: Ni Wen-ya
- In office 19 October 1951 – 11 March 1952
- Preceded by: Liu Chien-chun
- Succeeded by: Chang Tao-fan

Vice President of the Legislative Yuan
- In office 7 October 1950 – 24 February 1961
- President: Chang Tao-fan
- Preceded by: Liu Chien-chun
- Succeeded by: Ni Wen-ya

Member of the Legislative Yuan
- In office 1948–1987
- Constituency: Taiwan

Personal details
- Born: Yeh Yen-sheng; 8 August 1905 Hoppo, Shinchiku Prefecture, Japanese Taiwan
- Died: 8 December 1987 (aged 82) National Taiwan University Hospital, Taipei, Taiwan
- Party: Kuomintang
- Spouse: Lung Feng-ming (龍鳳鳴)
- Children: 2
- Education: Imperial Japanese Army Academy

Huang Kuo-shu (Chinese: 黃國書; pinyin: Huáng Guóshū; Wade–Giles: Huang^{2} Kuo^{2}-shu^{1}; 8 August 1905 – 8 December 1987), born Yeh Yen-sheng (Chinese: 葉焱生; pinyin: Yè Yànshēng) was a Taiwanese politician and the president of the Legislative Yuan, first as acting from 1951 to 1952, then officially from 1961 to 1972. He also served as the vice president of the Legislative Yuan from 1950 to 1961. Huang was the first president of the Legislative Yuan to be born on the island of Taiwan.

== Biography ==
Yeh Yen-sheng was born in 1905, in the small town of Hoppo, Shinchiku Prefecture, Japanese-ruled Taiwan (today Beipu, Hsinchu). In 1920, he went to China and changed his name to Huang Kuo-shu. Later, Huang went to study at the Imperial Japanese Army Academy.

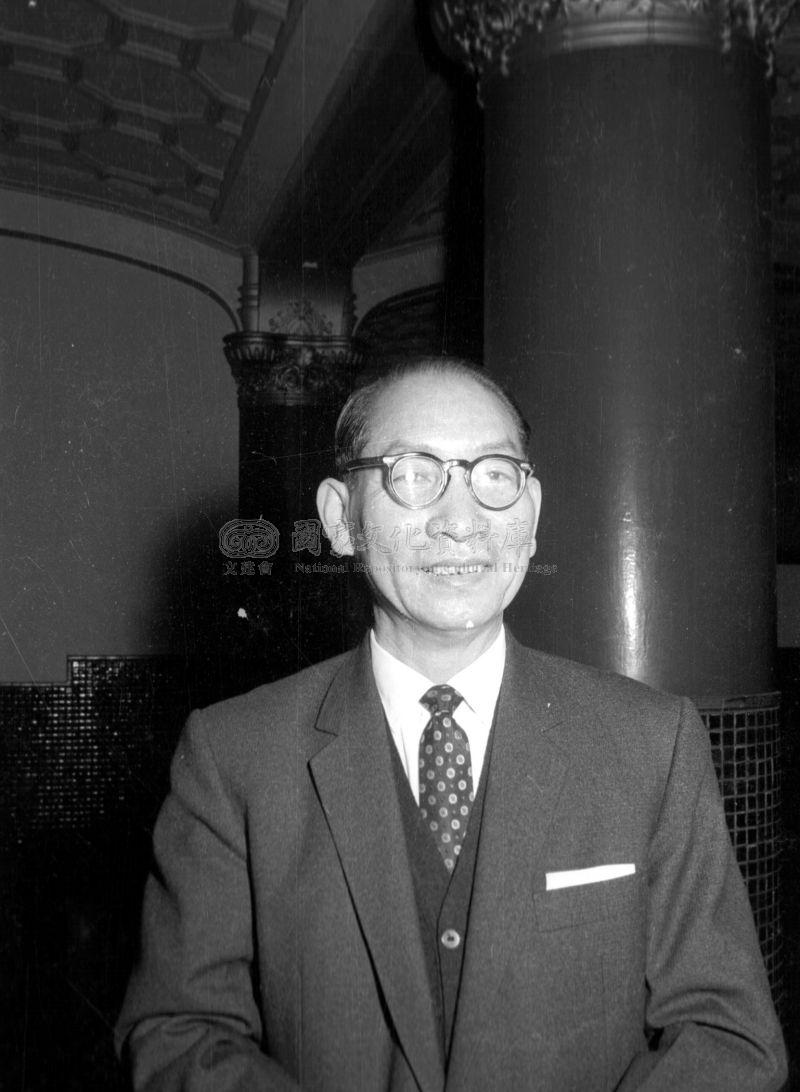
Huang in 1961

After the Second Sino-Japanese War, Huang returned to Taiwan as a major general. He was very prominent and participated in Legislative Yuan elections. In 1950, Huang was elected vice-president of the Legislative Yuan. On 24 February 1961, Chang Tao-fan resigned as president, and as a result Huang became president. He held the post for 11 years, when in 1972, he resigned due to health issues.

Huang was also a managing director of a company called Guoguang Life Insurance (國光人壽). The company filed for bankruptcy in 1970, and in 1972 the Ministry of Finance ordered Guoguang Life Insurance to close. Debt was reported to be NT$110 million.

Huang continued to serve as a member of the Legislative Yuan until his death in 1987.

Political offices
| Preceded by Chang Tao-fan | President of the Legislative Yuan; 1961–1972 | Succeeded by Ni Wen-ya |
