= Chairman of the Kuomintang =

Party leader of the Kuomintang

- 中國國民黨主席
- Emblem of the Kuomintang

- Flag of the Kuomintang

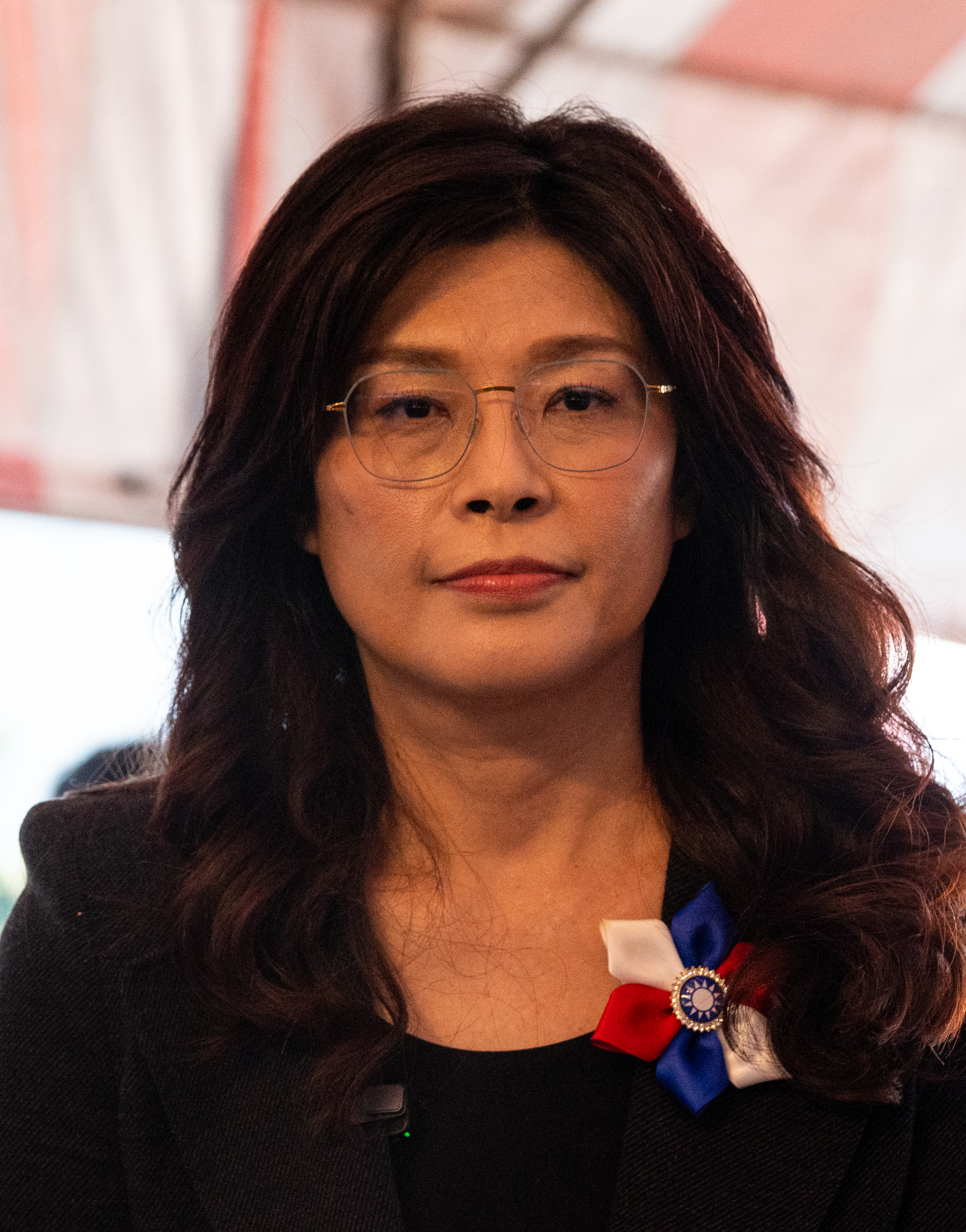
- Incumbent; Cheng Li-wun since 1 November 2025
- Central Committee of the Kuomintang
- Type: Party leader
- Term length: Fours years, renewable once consecutively
- Precursor: President (1912–1914); Premier (1919–1925); Chairman of the Central Executive Committee (1925–1938); Director-General (1938–1975)
- Inaugural holder: Sun Yat-sen
- Formation: 25 August 1912; 114 years ago
- Deputy: Vice Chairman of the Kuomintang

The chairman of the Kuomintang is the leader of the Kuomintang in the Republic of China. The position used to be titled as President (1912–1914), Premier (1919–1925), Chairman of the Central Executive Committee (1925–1938), Director-General (1938–1975), and Chairman (from 1975). The post is currently held by Cheng Li-wun, who assumed the post on 1 November 2025, following the eleventh direct election of the party leadership. The chairman is now directly elected by party members for a term of four years and may be re-elected for a second term.

== List of party leaders ==
denotes acting leader.

=== Presidents (1912–1914) ===
| Order | Portrait | Name | Term of Office | |
|---|---|---|---|---|
| 1 | | Sun Yat-sen | 25 August 1912 | 8 July 1914 |
| — | | Song Jiaoren | 25 August 1912 | 22 March 1913 |

Sun Yat-sen served as Premier of the Chinese Revolutionary Party between 8 July 1914 and 10 October 1919.

=== Premier (1919–1925) ===
| Order | Portrait | Name | Term of Office | | Party Congress |
|---|---|---|---|---|---|
| (1) | | Sun Yat-sen | 10 October 1919 | 30 January 1924 | |
| (1) | | Sun Yat-sen | 30 January 1924 | 12 March 1925 (Died in office) | 1st |

=== Chairmen of the Central Executive Committee (1925–1938) ===
==== Collective leadership ====
Following the death of Sun Yat-sen in 1925, the Central Executive Committee became the collective leadership of the Kuomintang. On 19 May 1926, the Central Executive Committee resolved to establish chairmanship. In March 1927, the collective leadership of the committee was revived, the chairmanship was thus abolished until 7 December 1935.

Members of the Committee include:

1925–1926
- Tan Pingshan (12 March 1925 – 19 May 1926)
- Dai Jitao (12 March 1925 – 16 January 1926)
- Liao Zhongkai (12 March 1925 – 20 August 1925, died in office)
- Wang Jingwei (22 January 1926 – 19 May 1926)
- Tan Yankai (22 January 1926 – 19 May 1926)
- Chiang Kai-shek (22 January 1926 – 19 May 1926)
- Lin Boqu (22 January 1926 – 19 May 1926)
- Hu Hanmin (22 January 1926 – 19 May 1926)
- Chen Gongbo (22 January 1926 – 19 May 1926)
- Kan Nai-kuang (22 January 1926 – 19 May 1926)
- Yang Pao'an (22 January 1926 – 19 May 1926)
1927–1935
- Chiang Kai-shek (1 March 1927 – 7 December 1935)
- Wang Jingwei (1 March 1927 – 7 February 1928, 28 December 1931 – 7 December 1935)
- Tan Yankai (1 March 1927 – 7 February 1928)
- Sun Fo (1 March 1927 – 7 February 1928, 21 September 1928 – 7 December 1935)
- Ku Meng-yu (1 March 1927 – 7 February 1928, 28 December 1931 – 7 December 1935)
- Tan Pingshan (1 March 1927 – 7 February 1928)
- Chen Gongbo (1 March 1927 – 7 February 1928)
- Xu Qian (1 March 1927 – 7 February 1928)
- Wu Yu-chang (1 March 1927 – 7 February 1928)
- Dai Jitao (7 February 1928 – 28 December 1931)
- Ding Weifen (7 February 1928 – 28 December 1931)
- Yu Youren (7 February 1928 – 7 December 1935)
- Tan Yankai (7 February 1928 – 28 December 1931)
- Hu Hanmin (21 September 1928 – 7 December 1935)
- Chen Guofu (28 March 1929 – 7 December 1935)
- Yeh Chu-cheng (28 March 1929 – 7 December 1935)
- Ju Zheng (28 December 1931 – 7 December 1935)

| Order | Portrait | Name | Term of Office | | Party Congress |
|---|---|---|---|---|---|
| — | Collective leadership of Central Executive Committee | | 12 March 1925 | 19 May 1926 | 1st |
| 2 | | Zhang Renjie | 19 May 1926 | 6 July 1926 | 2nd |
| — | | Zhang Renjie | 6 July 1926 | 11 March 1927 | 2nd |
| 3 | | Chiang Kai-shek | 6 July 1926 | 11 March 1927 | 2nd |
| — | Collective leadership of Central Executive Committee | | 11 March 1927 | 28 March 1929 | 2nd |
| — | Collective leadership of Central Executive Committee | | 28 March 1929 | 23 November 1931 | 3rd |
| — | Collective leadership of Central Executive Committee | | 23 November 1931 | 23 November 1935 | 4th |
| — | Collective leadership of Central Executive Committee | | 23 November 1935 | 7 December 1935 | 5th |
| 4 | | Hu Hanmin | 7 December 1935 | 12 May 1936 (Died in office) | 5th |
| — | | Chiang Kai-shek | 12 May 1936 | 1 April 1938 | 5th |

=== Director-General (1938–1975) ===
| Order | Portrait | Name | Term of Office | | Party Congress |
|---|---|---|---|---|---|
| — | | Chiang Kai-shek | 1 April 1938 | 17 May 1945 | Extraordinary |
| (3) | | Chiang Kai-shek | 17 May 1945 | 20 October 1952 | 6th |
| (3) | | Chiang Kai-shek | 20 October 1952 | 23 October 1957 | 7th |
| (3) | | Chiang Kai-shek | 23 October 1957 | 22 November 1963 | 8th |
| (3) | | Chiang Kai-shek | 22 November 1963 | 9 April 1969 | 9th |
| (3) | | Chiang Kai-shek | 9 April 1969 | 5 April 1975 (Died in office) | 10th |

=== Chairpersons (from 1975) ===
| Order | Portrait | Name | Term of Office | | Mandate | Party Congress | Notes |
|---|---|---|---|---|---|---|---|
| — | | Chiang Ching-kuo | 28 April 1975 | 16 November 1976 | Elected by Central Executive Committee | 10th | As Chairman of the Central Executive Committee |
| 5 | | Chiang Ching-kuo | 16 November 1976 | 4 April 1981 | 1976 (unopposed) | 11th | As Chairman of the Central Executive Committee |
| 5 | | Chiang Ching-kuo | 4 April 1981 | 13 January 1988 (Died in office) | 1981 (unopposed) | 12th | As Chairman of the Central Executive Committee |
| — | | Lee Teng-hui | 27 January 1988 | 8 July 1988 | Elected by Central Standing Committee | 12th | Resigned after 2000 presidential election defeat |
| 6 | | Lee Teng-hui | 8 July 1988 | 22 August 1993 | 1988 (unopposed) | 13th | Resigned after 2000 presidential election defeat |
| 6 | | Lee Teng-hui | 22 August 1993 | 28 August 1997 | 1993 (unopposed) | 14th | Resigned after 2000 presidential election defeat |
| 6 | | Lee Teng-hui | 28 August 1997 | 24 March 2000 (Resigned) | 1997 (unopposed) | 15th | Resigned after 2000 presidential election defeat |
| — | | Lien Chan | 24 March 2000 | 18 June 2000 | Elected by Central Standing Committee | 15th | |
| 7 | | Lien Chan | 18 June 2000 | 30 July 2001 | 2000 | 15th | |
| 7 | | Lien Chan | 30 July 2001 | 19 August 2005 | 2001 | 16th | |
| 8 | | Ma Ying-jeou | 19 August 2005 | 13 February 2007 (Resigned) | 2005 | 17th | Resigned amid corruption charges |
| — | | Wu Po hsiung | 13 February 2007 | 14 March 2007 (Resigned) | Vice Chair as acting Chair | 17th | Resigned to run in the 2007 KMT chairmanship by-election |
| — | | Chiang Pin-kung | 14 March 2007 | 11 April 2007 | Vice Chair as acting Chair | 17th | |
| 9 | | Wu Po-hsiung | 11 April 2007 | 17 October 2009 | 2007 | 17th | |
| (8) | | Ma Ying-jeou | 17 October 2009 | 29 September 2013 | 2009 | 18th | Resigned after 2014 local election defeat |
| (8) | | Ma Ying-jeou | 29 September 2013 | 3 December 2014 | 2013 | 19th | Resigned after 2014 local election defeat |
| — | | Wu Den-yih | 3 December 2014 | 19 January 2015 | Vice Chair as acting Chair | 19th | |
| 10 | | Eric Chu; Li-luan | 19 January 2015 | 16 January 2016 | 2015 | 19th | Resigned after 2016 presidential and legislative elections defeat |
| — | | Huang Min-hui | 16 January 2016 | 30 March 2016 | Vice Chair as acting Chair | 19th | |
| 11 | | Hung Hsiu-chu | 30 March 2016 | 3 July 2017 (Resigned) | 2016 | 19th | Resigned after re-election failed |
| — | | Lin Junq-tzer | 3 July 2017 | 19 August 2017 | Vice Chair as acting Chair | 19th | |
| 12 | | Wu Den-yih | 20 August 2017 | 15 January 2020 | 2017 | 20th | Resigned after 2020 presidential and legislative elections defeat |
| — | | Lin Rong-te | 15 January 2020 | 9 March 2020 | Elected by Central Standing Committee | 20th | Member of Central Standing Committee, acting leader after vice chairmen resigned |
| 13 | | Johnny Chiang; Chi-chen | 9 March 2020 | 5 October 2021 | 2020 | 20th | |
| (10) | | Eric Chu; Li-luan | 5 October 2021 | 1 November 2025 | 2021 | 21st | Declined re-election |
| 14 | | Cheng Li-wun | 1 November 2025 | Incumbent | 2025 | 22nd | |

== List of eternal and honorary leaders ==
- Eternal Premier: Sun Yat-sen
- Eternal Director-General: Chiang Kai-shek
- Honorary chairmen:
  - Lien Chan (2005–2015)
  - Wu Po-hsiung (2009–2015)

== See also ==
- List of leaders of the Democratic Progressive Party
- Secretary-General of the Kuomintang
- Leader of the Chinese Communist Party
