= 2001 Kuomintang chairmanship election =

24 March 2001	2005 →
- Turnout: 57.9%
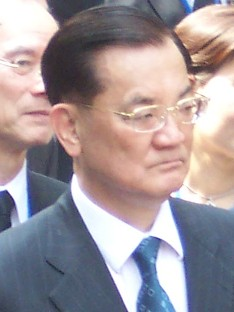
Nominee	Lien Chan
Popular vote	521,712
Percentage	100%
Chairman before election
Lien Chan
Elected Chairman
Lien Chan

The 2001 Kuomintang chairmanship election (Chinese: 2001年中國國民黨主席選舉) was held on 24 March 2001 in Taiwan. This was the first direct party leadership election in Kuomintang history in which all registered, due-paying party members were eligible to vote. In previous elections, only 2,000 high-ranking members could cast votes.

== History ==
Lee Teng-hui had assumed the presidency and Kuomintang chairmanship in 1988, after the death of Chiang Ching-kuo. With the help of Lien Chan, Lee had withstood a challenge to his leadership in 1997, shortly after the Kuomintang lost that year's local elections handily. In 2000, the Kuomintang lost the presidential election to Democratic Progressive Party candidate Chen Shui-bian, and discontent over Lee's leadership had again broken out. He planned to resign the chairmanship in September, but eventually submitted his resignation on 24 March, after days of speculation and protest. Lien Chan succeeded Lee as chairman in June. The first direct leadership election was scheduled for 24 March 2001. In previous elections, only 2,000 party representatives could vote for the office.

== Election ==
Lien Chan registered for the election on 9 February 2001, and ran unopposed, as Tuan Hung-chun was declared ineligible. Lien was required to gather a petition of three percent of the party membership to validate his candidacy. He garnered 521,712 of 537,370 votes in the election itself, at a time when the Kuomintang had an eligible voter count of 928,175. Lien won 97.09% of all votes cast, a record that would stand until 2015, when Eric Chu was elected.

Candidate	Party	Votes	%
Lien Chan	Kuomintang	521,712	100.00
Total		521,712	100.00
Valid votes		521,712	97.09
Invalid/blank votes		15,658	2.91
Total votes		537,370	100.00
Registered voters/turnout		928,175	57.90
