= 2005 Kuomintang chairmanship election =

- 16 July 2005
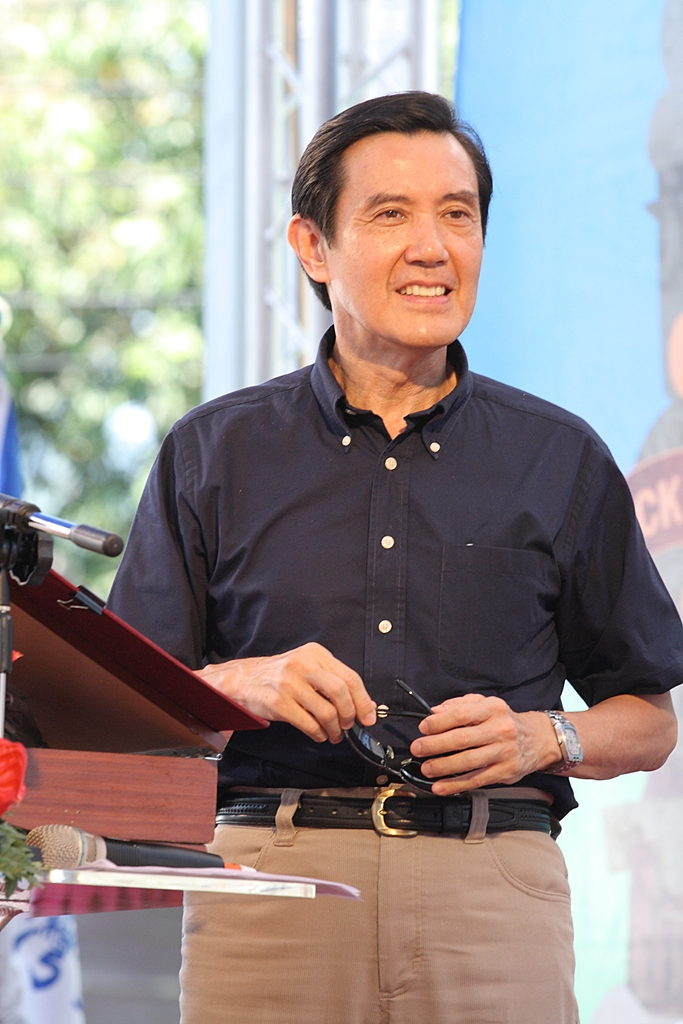

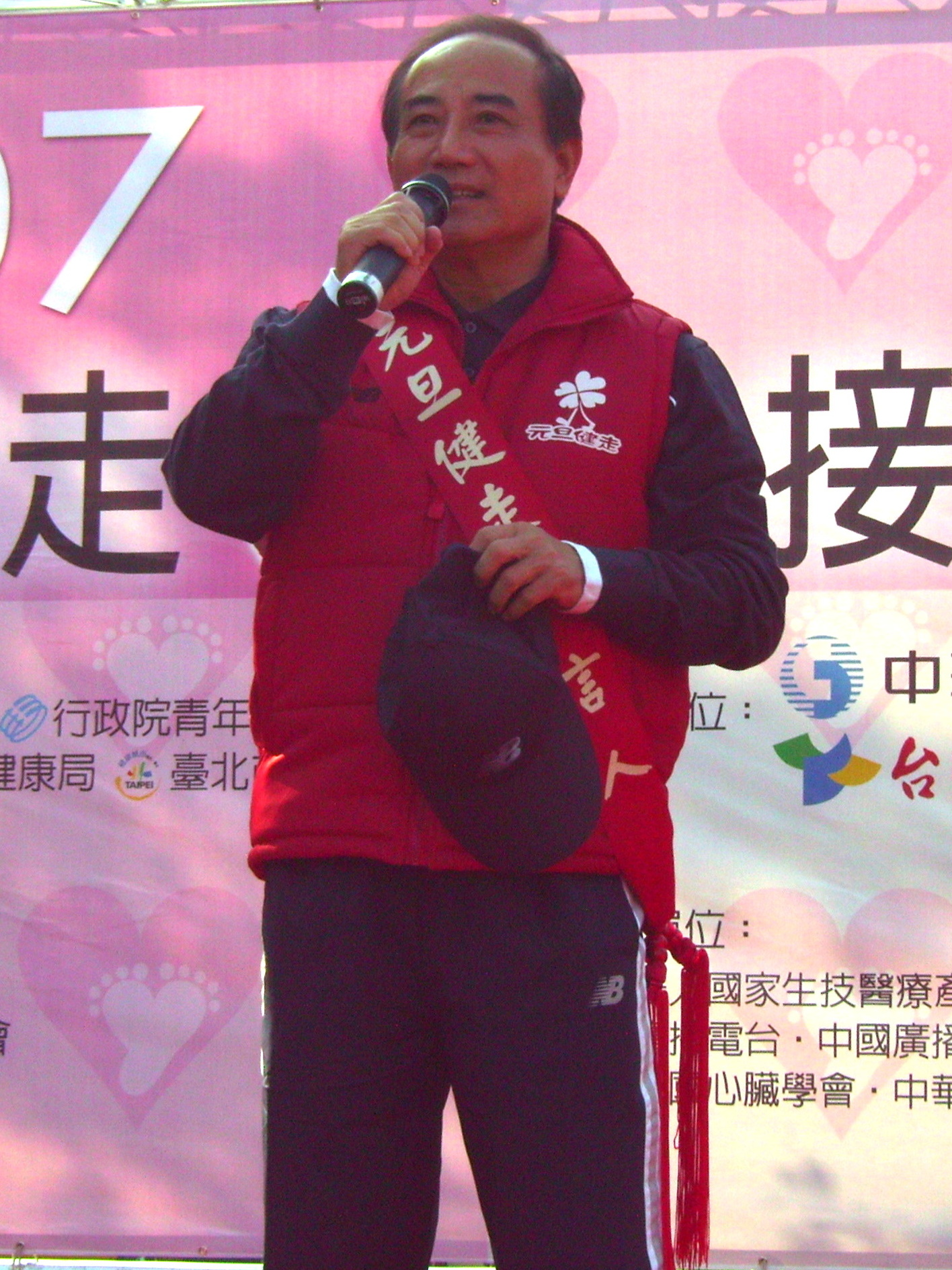
Nominee	Ma Ying-jeou	Wang Jin-pyng
Popular vote	375,056	143,268
Percentage	72.36%	27.64%
Chairman before election
Lien Chan
Elected Chairman
Ma Ying-jeou

The 2005 Kuomintang chairmanship election (Chinese: 2005年中國國民黨主席選舉) was held on July 16, 2005 in Taiwan between Ma Ying-jeou and Wang Jin-pyng. The election was triggered by the retirement of chairman Lien Chan.

This was the second direct election of the chairman in Kuomintang history. All registered, due-paying KMT party members were eligible to vote. Previous leaders of the KMT had been elected by the party congress in a one-man race (with the candidate being either the incumbent or his designated successor). Lien ran unopposed in 2001, but his election was decided by rank and file party members. Lien retired without naming a successor, choosing to retain a direct election for the office of chairman.

The election was widely seen as a preliminary contest for the party's nomination in the 2008 presidential election. Ma's landslide victory over Wang originally made him the frontrunner in the bid for the KMT presidential nomination. An indictment over corruption in 2007 damaged Ma's election hopes, but he eventually ended up winning the 2008 presidential election.

The following KMT chairmanship election occurred in 2007.

== Candidates ==
The election was less about specific issues and more about personality. Both candidates supported a conciliatory approach toward relations with the People's Republic of China and supported the party's opposition to Taiwan independence and support of the 1992 consensus. They both promised to reform the party to make it more democratic and crack down on black gold. Ma's supporters argued that being younger and more charismatic, he would provide the party with a more youthful, clean, and open image which would be useful for the party in the 2008 legislative elections and the 2008 presidential elections. Wang's supporters cited his experience as speaker of the Legislative Yuan and his support among party leaders as vital in uniting the pan-Blue Coalition.

Ma Ying-jeou ran in the election while serving as the mayor of Taipei City and a vice chairman of the KMT. His efforts at cracking down on black gold during his tenure as Justice Minister in the 1990s earned him a reputation of incorruptibility, especially because he was fired from this post for alienating the political underground, and his political career was considered to be over. His clean and competent public image and personal charisma has made him a widely popular politician, especially among female and younger voters. However, his critics claim that he, unlike his opponent, lacks friends among the KMT's political elite and has little experience in forging political alliances. In addition, his opponents claim that Ma's background as a Mainlander (he was born in Hong Kong to Hunanese parents) may become a problem when he runs for president (in the 2004 presidential election President Chen Shui-bian questioned his mainland-born opponents' loyalty towards Taiwan and questioned whether they would "sell Taiwan out" to the PRC). In response, his supporters cite polls that indicate that Ma is popular among all ethnicities and regions in Taiwan, and that substantial numbers of DPP supporters have indicated in polls that they would vote for him.

Wang Jin-pyng, also a vice chairman of the KMT, though less popular and charismatic than his opponent, has gained the reputation of being a shrewd and capable politician. He has served in the Legislative Yuan since 1976 and as the President of the Legislative Yuan since 1999. As President of the Legislative Yuan, he was seen as being a conciliatory leader, avoiding the heated rhetoric to reach across the political divide.

Wang enjoyed the support of many KMT political heavyweights. He was endorsed by party elders Lee Huan, Chen Jien-chung, Sung Shih-hsuan, and Yu Chung-ji. Prominent legislators John Chiang and Lee Ching-hua also supported Wang's candidacy. Around 130 retired generals also endorsed Wang, including president of National Defense University Cheng Pan-chi, former combined services deputy Wang Yi-tien, and former deputy director and executive officer of the ministry's Political Warfare Bureau Chen Hsing-kuo. In an about-face from his earlier pledge and order to other People First Party (PFP) politicians not to involve themselves in the election for KMT chairmanship, In the night before the election, PFP Chairman James Soong made a videotaped appearance to endorse Wang. Lien Chan, although promising to stay neutral during the campaign, was accidentally caught by news cameras voting for Wang Jin-pyng. This was seen as a move by Lien to unify the KMT, since Wang was trailing far behind Ma in the polls. In contrast, the only senior KMT political heavyweight endorsement received by Ma was from Hau Pei-tsun, although Ma received endorsement from some of his fellow middle-aged KMT politicians, including Jason Hu, the mayor of Taichung; Eric Chu, the magistrate of Taoyuan County; and Wu Den-yih, legislator from Nantou County and former mayor of Kaohsiung.

Wang's status as a Holo-speaker associated with the pro-localization faction of the KMT required him to dispel fears that he would turn out to be "another Lee Teng-hui" (who founded the pro-independence Taiwan Solidarity Union and was expelled from the party) or that he would leave the KMT to join the TSU if he lost the election. At the same time, Ma needed to dispel the stereotype of him as an urban Mainlander from Taipei unconnected with rural southern Holo-speaking Taiwan.

During the campaign both candidates attempted to dispel their stereotypes: Wang stressed his loyalty to the KMT and Republic of China (such as by singing patriotic songs from the Chiang Kai-shek-era) and gaining the support of conservative Mainlander heavyweights within the KMT. His Mainlander opponent Ma stressed his connection with the people of Taiwan and proposed measures such as moving some KMT Central Standing Committee meetings from Taipei to southern Taiwan.

== Dynamics ==
Over 1 million KMT party members were eligible to vote. In the months leading to the election there was bitter debate between the two candidates over which party members were eligible to vote. While the Ma campaign wanted to limit the vote 300,000 party members fully paid-up in their annual dues, the Wang campaign argued that all 1.1 million card-carrying members would be eligible. The 300,000 members "in good standing" were mostly veterans and party members, considered part of the right wing of the party, who were most likely to vote for Ma on the basis of his mainlander background. The 1.1 million members included a much greater proportion of native Taiwanese and some less enthusiastic supporters of the party who joined as a result of working for a state-run enterprise in which, before democratic reforms in the 1990s, KMT membership was encouraged and somewhat compelled. Finally it was agreed to that all card-carrying members would be able to vote as polls showed Ma running ahead of Wang even with the franchise opened. This request by Wang arguably backfired, as it might have very well been the case that members who were less involved with internal party politics became more attracted to Ma's personality.

The chairmanship election coincided with elections for 985 party delegates for the KMT's 17th national party congress. Each voting booth had three ballot boxes: one ballot box for the party chairman, the second ballot box for the party delegates, and the third ballot box for KMT members from military villages also voting for delegates.

== Result ==
Candidate	Party	Votes	%
Ma Ying-jeou	Kuomintang	375,056	72.36
Wang Jin-pyng	Kuomintang	143,268	27.64
Total		518,324	100.00
Valid votes		518,324	98.82
Invalid/blank votes		6,163	1.18
Total votes		524,487	100.00
Registered voters/turnout		1,045,467	50.17

== See also ==
- Elections in the Republic of China
- List of leaders of the Kuomintang
