= 13th Congress =

13th Congress may refer to:

- 13th Congress of the League of Communists of Yugoslavia (1986)
- 13th Congress of the Philippines (2004–2007)
- 13th Congress of the Russian Communist Party (Bolsheviks) (1924)
- 13th National Congress of the Chinese Communist Party (1987)
- 13th National Congress of the Communist Party of Vietnam (2021)
- 13th National Congress of the Kuomintang (1988)
- 13th National People's Congress (2018–2023)
- 13th United States Congress (1813–1815)
