= 19th Congress =

19th Congress may refer to

- 19th Congress of the Communist Party of the Soviet Union (1952)
- 19th Congress of the Philippines (2022–2025)
- 19th National Congress of the Chinese Communist Party (2017)
- 19th National Congress of the Kuomintang (2013)
- 19th United States Congress (1825–1827)
