= Teng (surname) =

- Romanization: Téng, Teng (Mandarin); Tàhng (Cantonese); Tang (Hong Kong Cantonese); Têng (Hokkien, Teochew); Ddàng (Wenzhounese)
- Language: Chinese

Origin
- Language: China

Other names
- Variant forms: Teguh, Temenggung, Tendean, Tengadi, Tengagung, Tenggara, Tenggeli, Tengker, Tengwijaya (Chinese-Indonesian)

Teng (Chinese: 滕; pinyin: Téng; Wade–Giles: T'eng²) is a Chinese surname derived from State of Teng (Imperial clan descendants) in the Western Zhou dynasty. It is the 73rd name on the Hundred Family Surnames poem. It is T'eng in Wade–Giles, Tàhng in Cantonese and is usually Romanized as "Tang" in Hong Kong. It is Têng in Hokkien and Teochew. It is "ddàng"in Wenzhou.

"Teng" can also be used as an alternate spelling of the Chinese surname Deng (鄧/邓, Dèng) used especially in Taiwan based on the Wade-Giles transliteration of Mandarin Chinese. This spelling is used in many English language sources on China written before the widespread adoption of the pinyin transliteration system in the 1980s. For example, Deng Xiaoping was written "Teng Hsiao-p'ing."

== Notable persons with the surname Teng ==
=== 滕 Téng ===
- Teng Yin (滕胤; died 256), Wu minister during the Three Kingdoms period
- Empress Teng (滕皇后; fl. 258–284), empress of Eastern Wu during the Three Kingdoms period of Chin
- Teng Xiu (滕脩; died 288), Wu minister during the Three Kingdoms period
- Teng Zongliang (滕宗諒; 991–1047), Northern Song dynasty official
- Teng Daiyuan (滕代远; 1904–1974), Chinese military leader and senior leader of the Chinese Communist Party
- Teng Chie (滕傑; 1906–2004), Republic of China general and politician
- Teng Haiqing (滕海清; 1909–1997), Chinese military officer and politician
- Teng Weizao (滕维藻; 1917–2008), Chinese economist and educator
- Dr. Rev. Philip Jinhui Teng (滕近輝; 1922–2013), Christian theologian and author
- Teng Jinxian (滕进贤; 1937–2022), Chinese film director
- Teng Wensheng (滕文生; born 1940), Chinese politician
- Teng Rujun (滕汝骏; 1946–2023), Chinese actor
- Chuu-Lian Terng (滕楚蓮; born 1949), Taiwanese-American mathematician
- Shanghua Teng (滕尚华, born 1964), Chinese-American computer scientist
- Teng Jin-guang (滕锦光; born 1964), Chinese engineer and educator
- Teng Jiacai (滕佳材; born 1964), Chinese politician
- Teng Biao (滕彪; born 1973), formerly Beijing-based human rights lawyer now in exile
- Teng Wei (滕巍; born 1974), Chinese football player
- Joyce Tang (滕麗名; born 1976), Hong Kong actress
- Teng Haibin (滕海滨; born 1985), Chinese gymnast
- Teng Bin (滕彬; born 1985), Chinese footballer
- Teng Zhiqiang (滕志强; born 1991), Chinese male slalom canoeist
- Teng Shangkun (滕尚坤; born 1991), Chinese footballer

=== Unknown ===
- Vienna Teng, (stage name) born Cynthia Yih Shih (史逸欣; born 1978), American singer-songwriter and pianist

== See also ==
- Tais Teng, pseudonym of a Dutch writer
- Chinese name
- Teng (mythology)
