= 10th Congress =

10th Congress may refer to:

- 10th Congress of Colombia (2026–2030)
- 10th Congress of the Philippines (1995–1998)
- 10th Congress of the Russian Communist Party (Bolsheviks) (1921)
- 10th National Congress of the Chinese Communist Party (1973)
- 10th National Congress of the Communist Party of Vietnam (2006)
- 10th National Congress of the Kuomintang (1969)
- 10th National Congress of the Lao People's Revolutionary Party (2016)
- 10th National People's Congress (2003–2008)
- 10th United States Congress (1807–1809)
