= 2007 Kuomintang chairmanship by-election =

- 7 April 2007
- Turnout: 53.75%
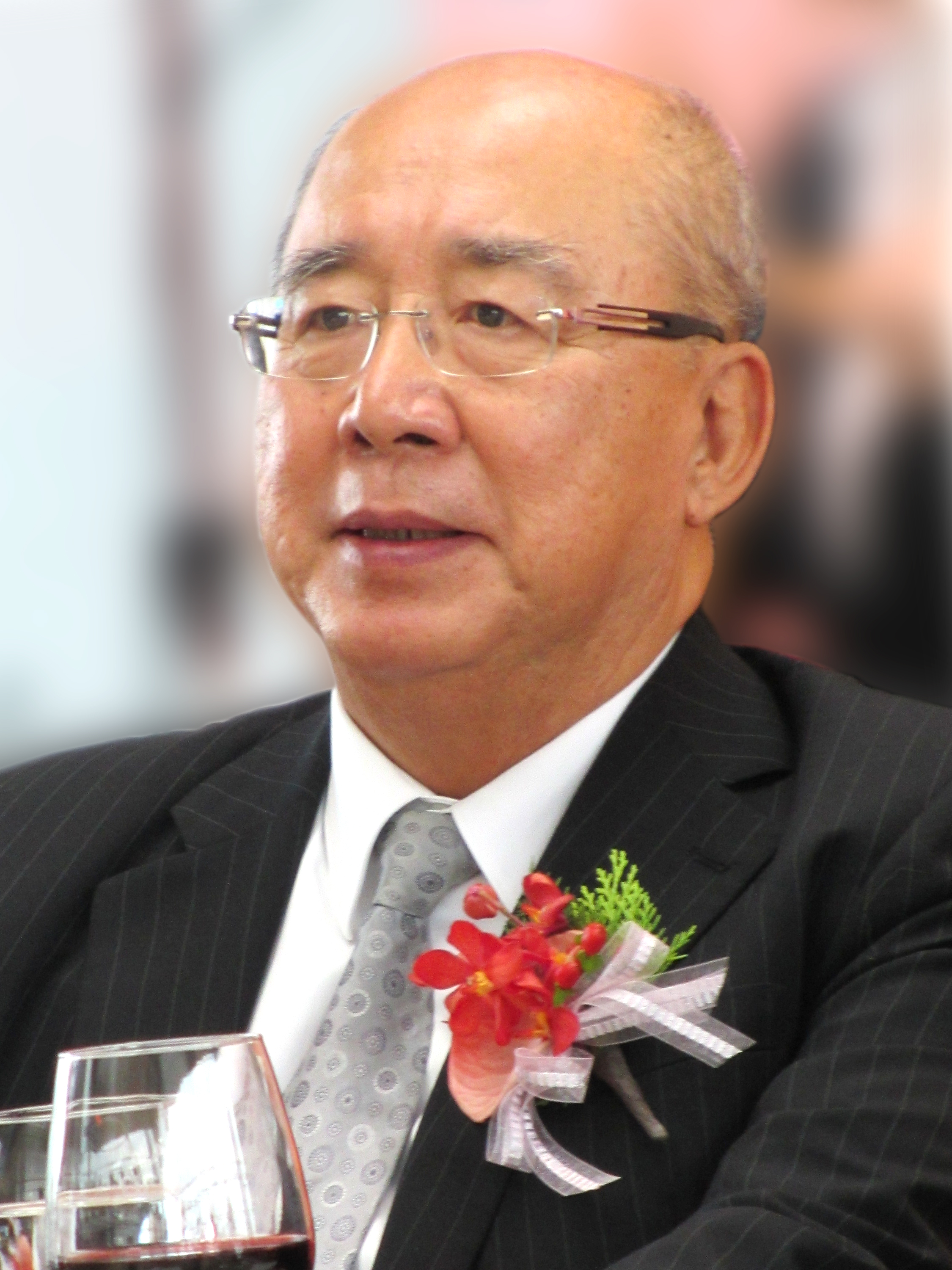

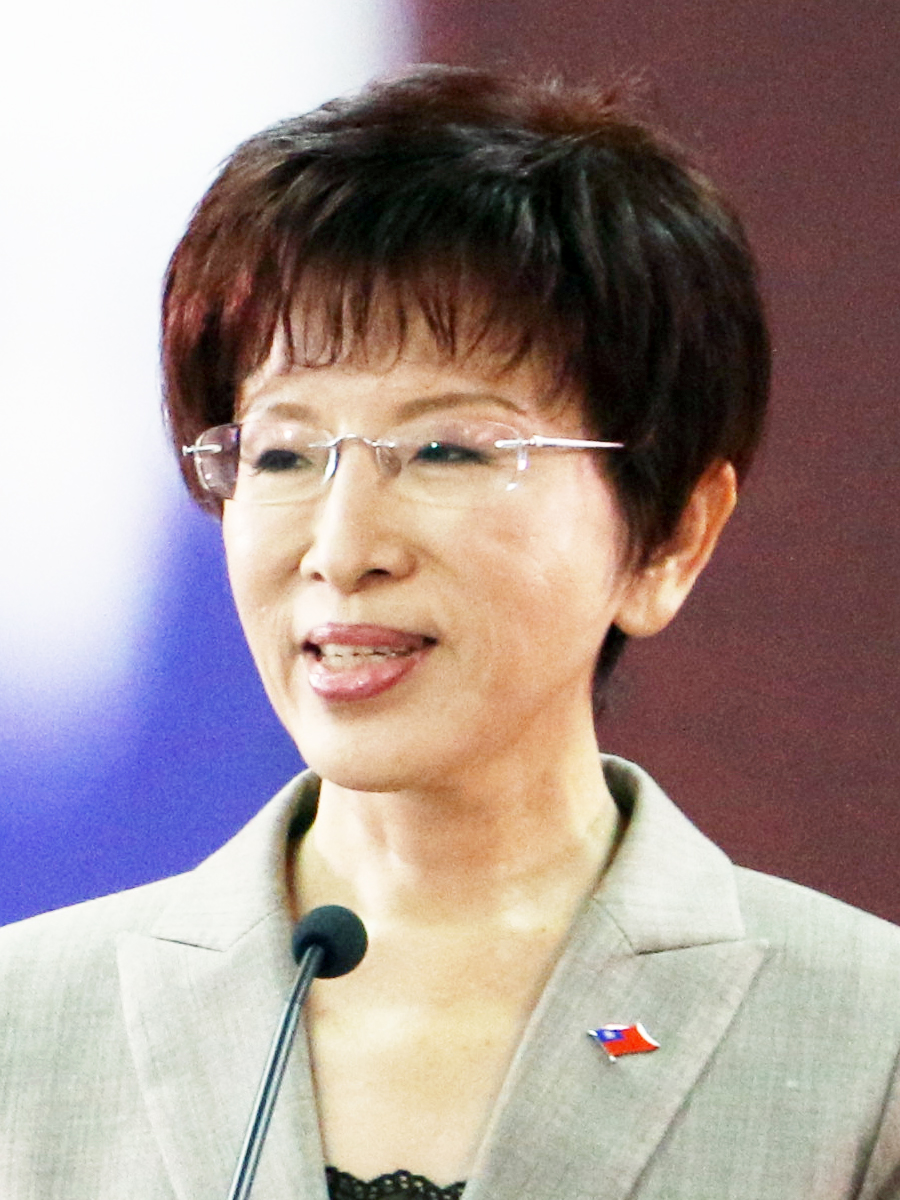
Nominee	Wu Po-hsiung	Hung Hsiu-chu
Popular vote	156,499	23,447
Percentage	86.97%	13.03%
Chairman before election
Chiang Pin-kung (acting)
Elected Chairman
Wu Po-hsiung

The 2007 Kuomintang chairmanship by-election (Chinese: 2007年中國國民黨主席補選) was held on 7 April 2007 in Taiwan between Wu Po-hsiung and Hung Hsiu-chu. This was the third direct election of the chairman in the Kuomintang history. All registered, due-paying KMT party members were eligible to vote. The previous leadership election had occurred in 2005.

The election was triggered by the resignation of chairman Ma Ying-jeou after he was indicted for allegedly misusing funds while Mayor of Taipei. The Taiwan High Court eventually cleared Ma of all corruption charges. The election, held on 7 April, was won by Wu Poh-hsiung.

Candidate	Party	Votes	%
Wu Poh-hsiung	Kuomintang	156,499	86.97
Hung Hsiu-chu	Kuomintang	23,447	13.03
Total		179,946	100.00
Valid votes		179,946	99.21
Invalid/blank votes		1,428	0.79
Total votes		181,374	100.00
Registered voters/turnout		337,467	53.75
