= September 2013 power struggle =

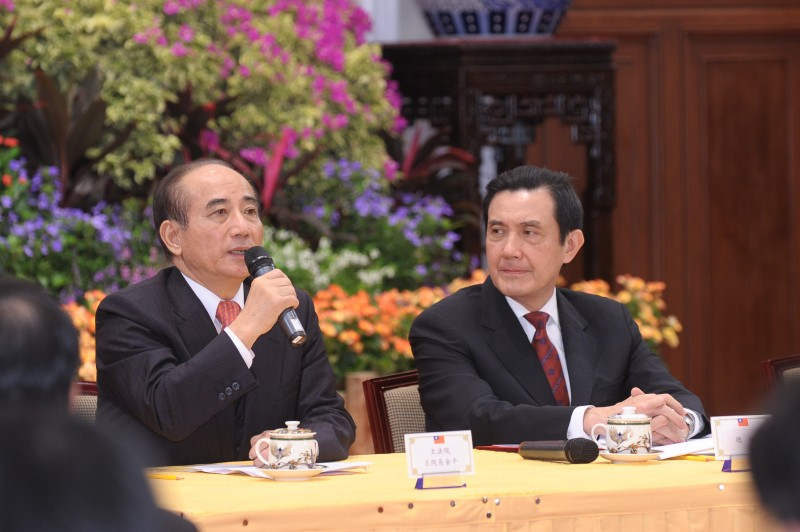
President Ma Ying-jeou (right) and the speaker of the legislature Wang Jin-pyng (left)

The September 2013 power struggle was a political crisis in Taiwan, entailing the power struggle between President Ma Ying-jeou and the speaker of the legislature Wang Jin-pyng, both of the governing Kuomintang party. It set a historical precedent in which both the president and the premier Jiang Yi-huah were interrogated simultaneously and separately. Allegations included undue influence on the part of legislators, leaks of confidential information by the prosecutor general, and surveillance of the legislature by the Special Investigation Division under his office.

== See also ==
- February 1990 power struggle
- 2013 Kuomintang chairmanship election
- Sunflower Student Movement
