= Extraordinary National Congress of the Kuomintang =

Extraordinary National Congress of the Kuomintang, or Emergency National Congress of the Kuomintang, was held in 1938 in the library of Wuhan University, Wuchang. The party congress of the ruling Kuomintang spanned for 4 nights between 29 March and 1 April.

The Extraordinary National Congress received reports of the government, the party, and the military, and also formulated guidelines on fighting the war with Japanese. Chiang Kai-shek was elected Director-General of the Kuomintang, and Wang Jingwei as deputy. Motions were adopted to set up National Political Participation Council to "unify" the will of the people, and Three Principles of the People Youth Corps, the youth wing of the party.

The meeting ended the collective leadership of the Central Executive Committee of the Party, and affirmed the military-first direction of the nation.
