= 13th National Congress of the Kuomintang =

The 13th National Congress of the Kuomintang (Chinese: 中國國民黨第十三次全國代表大会) was the thirteenth national congress of the Kuomintang, held on 7 to 13 July 1988 in Linkou Township, Taipei County, Taiwan.

== History ==
The congress date was recommended by Chairperson Chiang Ching-kuo to coincide with the 51st anniversary of the start of Second Sino-Japanese War.

== Results ==
Lee Teng-hui was elected as Chairperson of the Kuomintang on 8 July 1988 from acting Chairperson of the party after the death of the former Chairperson Chiang Ching-kuo on 13 January 1988.
