= Teng Jie =

Chinese general and politician (1906–2004)

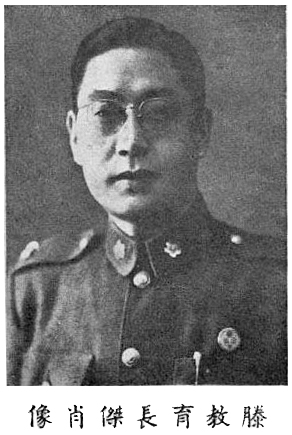
- Born: 25 January 1906; Funing, Huai'an, Jiangsu
- Died: 4 July 2004 (aged 98); Taipei, Taiwan
- Military career
- Allegiance: Republic of China
- Branch: (Republic of China (1912–1949)) National Revolutionary Army

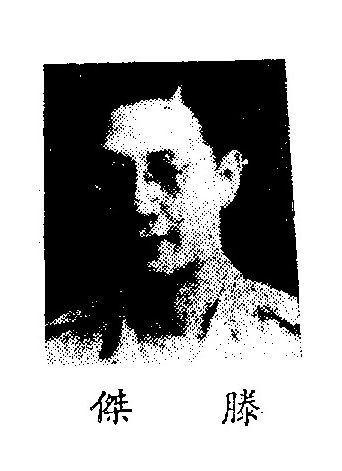
Teng Jie attending the Constitutional National Assembly

Teng Jie (25 January 1906 – 4 July 2004), courtesy name, Junfu, was a Chinese general and politician of the Republic of China.

== Early life ==
Teng Jie was born on 25 January 1906, in Funing, Huai'an, Jiangsu. After graduating from the 4th Infantry Course of Huangpu Military Academy, Teng Jie went to Japan to study and studied political economy at Meiji University. After returning to China, he participated in the Northern Expedition of the National Revolutionary Army and served as deputy director of the Political Department of the General Headquarters of the National Revolutionary Army. Later, he was appointed leader of the fourth group of the Attendant Office of the Chairman of the Military Commission of the National Government. On 1 March 1932, the Three People's Principles League, which Teng Jie assisted in organizing, was formally established. Jiang Zhongzheng was elected as the president (collectively referred to as the leader), and Teng Jie was appointed as the executive director (also the executive director). The four are: He Zhonghan, Kang Ze, Gui Yongqing, Pan Youqiang) and the first secretary. On 8 March 1933, the third-level (executive) China Fuxing Society (Fuxing Society) was established, with Teng Jie serving as secretary. In 1933 (the 22nd year of the Republic of China), he served as the director of the Political Training Department of the Central Army Military Academy. In 1934, he went to Europe to inspect political economy. After the summer of 1935, he successively served as a counselor of the Hunan Provincial Government and chief of staff of the Hunan Provincial Military District.

== Wartime ==
After the outbreak of the Second Sino-Japanese War, in 1939 he served as director of the Political Department of the First Regiment (War Cadre Training Group No. 1) of the Military Commission of the National Government and director of the General Office of the Political Department of the Military Commission of the National Government. In November 1941, Teng Jie was appointed as the director of the Central Committee of the Three People's Principles Youth League in the preparatory stage. In February 1943, the Three People's Principles Youth League was formally established, served as a director of the Central Committee of the Chinese Communist Party, and was promoted to Army Major General.

After the Surrender of Japan in August 1945, he served as director of the Political Department of the Lieutenant General of the Third War Zone Commander's Department. He flew from Chongqing to Hangzhou and took up the post, completely replacing the previous team of Deng Wenyi. In December 1945, he was transferred to Xuzhou with the headquarters of the Commander-in-Chief of the Third War Zone and served as director of the Political Department of the Xuzhou Appeasement Office. In November 1946, he was elected as a representative of the Constitutional National Assembly. In March 1947, he became a member of the Legislative Yuan. In November 1947, he was elected as a representative of the National Assembly for the Implementation of the Constitution and served as Secretary-General of the National Assembly Party Department of the Chinese Kuomintang. In the middle of the same year, he served as the Secretary-General of the Xuzhou Headquarters of the Army General Headquarters and the education director of the Xuzhou Branch of the Central Training Corps.

On 22 December 1948, the Central Standing Committee of the Chinese Kuomintang approved the resignation of Nanjing Mayor Shen Yi and was succeeded by Teng Jie.On 24 December, Chiang Kai-shek appointed Teng Jie as the mayor of Nanjing and chairman of the Nanjing Party Committee. The former Shen Yi was dismissed from his post.

On 22 April 1949, the day before the People's Liberation Army captured Nanjing, Teng Jie was still working, signing and issuing orders. He then fled Nanjing and went to Taiwan. He was the last mayor of Nanjing in the Republic of China. After Teng Jie came to Taiwan, he served as Secretary-General of the National Congress of the Chinese Kuomintang and a member of the Central Committee of the Chinese Kuomintang from the 9th to the 15th session. In addition, he has served as a lecturer at the National Defense Research Institute, chairman of the Board of Directors of the Central Trust Bureau, a member of the Liberation Continent Design Research Committee, and a professor at the Political Combat Cadre School.

== Later life ==
In 1981, Teng Jie served as chairman of the Taiwan Arms Export Trading Corporation.

In 1988, Chiang Ching-kuo, then President of the Republic of China and Chairman of the Chinese Kuomintang, died. After a political dispute in February, Lee Teng-hui succeeded him as president and chairman of the Kuomintang.

In January 1990, President Lee Teng-hui announced that Lee Yuan-tsu would be his deputy to participate in the 1990 presidential election. On 21 January of the same year, Teng Jie organized the China National Democratic Unification Conference and served as its president. At the end of February, as a representative of the first National Congress that had not been re-elected for more than 42 years, Teng Jie, together with a small number of National Congress representatives, announced the election of Lin Yang-kang, President of the Judicial Yuan, and Chiang Wei-kuo to participate in the election of the President and Vice President. In the same year, Teng Jie helped arrange Deng Wenyi's visit to the People's Republic of China and met with Xu Xiangqian and Deng Xiaoping.

On 4 July 2004, Teng Jie died at the Taipei Veterans General Hospital aged 99.

== Works ==
- 《我國憲法與政黨政治》
- 《組織戰》
- 《民族復興運動》
- 《從抗日到反獨：滕傑口述歷史》：滕傑口述、勞政武編撰，淨名文化中心2014年初版，ISBN 9789868715929
