= 19th National Congress of the Kuomintang =

The 19th National Congress of the Kuomintang (Chinese: 中國國民黨第十九次全國代表大会) was the nineteenth national congress of the Kuomintang (KMT), which held on 10 November 2013 in Taichung Harbor Sports Stadium, Wuqi, Taichung, Taiwan.

== History ==
The 19th national congress was originally planned to be held on 29 September 2013 at National Sun Yat-sen Memorial Hall in Taipei, but later changed to Taichung due to security concern.

== Results ==
This congress marked the official inauguration of Ma Ying-jeou second term as Chairman of KMT in which he had won previously with 91.85% result during the KMT chairmanship election on 20 July 2013. Lien Chan and Wu Po-hsiung were reelected as KMT honorary chairmen. The current six vice chairpersons of KMT were also remain in their post.

== See also ==
- Kuomintang
