= Black gold (politics) =

Corruption in Taiwan

Black gold (Chinese: 黑金; pinyin: hēi jīn) is a term used in Taiwan to refer to political corruption, underworld politics and political violence. The term refers to the obtaining of money (the "gold") through a dark, secretive, and corrupt method ("black", an adjective in Chinese that also means illegal or illicit).

== Kuomintang ==
The Kuomintang (KMT; Chinese Nationalist Party) has frequently been criticized in Taiwan for its connections to gangsters and black gold. The party has had a long association with underground societies, and its founder Sun Yat-sen had joined the Triads to gain support for the Republican Revolution. In its early years, the KMT relied on support from organized crime, gangs, and unions and clan organizations with criminal ties in its efforts to consolidate power in war-torn post-imperial China. As a result, the party made concessions to local "crime bosses", such as the notorious Du Yuesheng in Shanghai, who were well-connected with its longtime leader, Chiang Kai-shek. During the Shanghai massacre of 1927, the KMT employed the Green Gang to exterminate suspected communists; the Green Gang also happened to be a major financial supporter of Chiang Kai-shek. The KMT's relationships with such organizations are believed to persist. KMT fled to Taiwan following the Chinese Civil War. As Minister of Justice from 1993 to 1996, former Taipei mayor and KMT Party Chairman Ma Ying-jeou is credited with attempts to fight black gold corruption and bring KMT out of corruption, and his removal from office by the KMT was widely attributed to him being too effective at fighting black gold.

After Lee Teng-hui succeeded as President of the Republic of China and Chairman of the Kuomintang (KMT), he encouraged individuals with connections to organized crime to run for various local government positions and legislative offices. This led to the rapid development of "black gold politics" and "local factions" in Taiwan’s political arena at the time. Many individuals with criminal backgrounds "bleached" their pasts in order to seek "protection" (the privilege for legislators to avoid arrest during legislative sessions without a resolution), using their strong financial power in local areas to win elections. During their terms, they used their positions to shield themselves, causing political chaos in Taiwan. Notable examples include independent legislator Luo Fuzhu, who was involved in multiple cases of legislative violence and related incidents outside the legislature, as well as KMT-affiliated figures such as Pingtung County legislator Kuo Ting-tsai, Taichung City legislator Yen Qing-biao, Pingtung County speaker Cheng Tai-chi, Pingtung County magistrate Wu Ze-yuan, Chiayi County speaker Hsiao Teng-biao, Changhua County speaker Bai Hong-sen, and deputy speaker Zhan Zhong-ren. As a result, the public lost confidence in the ruling Kuomintang, which led to the party losing power in the 2000 Republic of China presidential election, marking the end of its 55-year rule. Some believe that Lee Teng-hui and those he relied on, such as James Soong, Lien Chan, Liu Tai-ying, and Su Zhi-cheng, bear undeniable responsibility for the inappropriate political-business networks. As a result, Lee Teng-hui has been widely referred to as the "Godfather of Black Gold Politics." Some believe that Lee Teng-hui and those he relied on, such as James Soong, Lien Chan, Liu Tai-ying, Su Zhi-cheng, and others, bear undeniable responsibility for the inappropriate political-business networks. As a result, Lee Teng-hui is known as the "Godfather of Black Gold Politics."

From 1984, with the launch of the "Yiqing Operation" (一清專案), until September 1996, when the Ministry of the Interior published the "Results of Crackdown on Organized Crime in Taiwan" (the largest post-Yiqing anti-crime campaign), researchers observed that organized crime groups maintained a relatively stable presence in Taiwan despite repeated government crackdowns. Analysts noted that although these campaigns were low-cost and produced immediate short-term effects, they failed to resolve the structural problem, and, due to weaknesses in the judicial system, many criminal figures were effectively "beyond the reach of the law." Furthermore, the disruption of the existing “black-and-white” balance between legitimate and illegitimate actors arguably stimulated further political engagement by organized crime.

During Lee Teng-hui’s presidency, Taiwanese media revealed numerous high-profile cases of collusion between local governments, politicians, and organized crime, commonly referred to as "black-gold projects" (黑金工程). Notable examples included the Yehliu Tunnel project, the Eighteen Bidding Case, the Siban-tou Pumping Station project, and the most prominent, the 1996 Taiwan Taoyuan International Airport Terminal Two renovation scandal. In these large-scale projects, valued at tens of billions of New Taiwan Dollars, collusion occurred in two stages: initially, so-called "white channels" involved elected representatives lobbying for budget approval and influencing project planning, followed by "black channels," in which organized crime used intimidation and violence to eliminate competition. The profits were subsequently shared between legitimate and criminal actors. Then-Minister of Justice Ma Ying-jeou argued that "the inability to fully eradicate organized crime and violent crime stems largely from the integration of criminal elements into electoral politics, allowing them to operate behind the scenes or openly, to engage in illicit activities, or to use legitimate companies and political positions as cover."

At the local level, electoral oversight efforts produced similarly mixed outcomes. For example, during the March 1994 county and municipal council speaker elections, allegations of vote-buying and electoral violence were widespread. The Kuomintang (KMT)-endorsed candidates largely prevailed, prompting opposition parties and media to criticize the process. Senior KMT figures such as Yu Kuo-hua and Hau Pei-tsun also expressed concern during party meetings, resulting in a large-scale anti-corruption and vote-buying campaign led by the Ministry of Justice. Ma Ying-jeou, serving at the time as Minister of Justice, publicly pledged three times that he would resign if the campaign failed. The operation ultimately led to 320 councilors being prosecuted, with 277 convicted at first instance. The campaign temporarily improved electoral integrity, and in the following year’s Legislative Yuan elections, vote-buying declined in information-rich regions, although it persisted in some rural counties.

Despite these measures, internal resistance within the KMT and local councils remained significant. Some provincial councils, including those in Pingtung, Kaohsiung, Chiayi, and Hualien, convened emergency sessions to avoid compliance with subpoenas and to obstruct review of additional budgets. KMT provincial officials publicly cautioned that the crackdown could weaken the party’s local base and endanger candidate prospects. Meanwhile, organized crime continued to intervene violently in elections. Government statistics indicate that in the 1990 local elections for legislators and county magistrates, violent incidents occurred in fifteen counties and cities (65% of Taiwan’s 23 administrative regions), including murder, assault, arson, kidnapping, intimidation, and extortion of candidates or campaign staff. Specific cases included shootings, assaults, and deaths of local councilors and representatives in Changhua, Yunlin, Chiayi, and Tainan, among others.

Additionally, vote manipulation and financial interference took many forms, including direct vote-buying by local agents (“樁腳買票”), indirect vote-buying, and organized banquets for voters, among at least eleven documented methods of electoral corruption.

== Democratic Progress Party ==
The Democratic Progressive Party (DPP) gained considerable support in the 1990s through its reform agenda, even from those opposed to the DPP position on Taiwanese independence. President Chen Shui-bian, former Taipei mayor, was noted for his attempts to clamp down on black gold throughout his career. However, Chen's presidential administration has been criticized, including by former colleagues and supporters, for exploiting their control of government for personal wealth in, a typical black-gold manner. Former DPP party leader Hsu Hsin-liang has criticized Chen in a public speech for betraying the ideals of the DPP after coming to power. After a series of high-profile corruption scandals, public support for DPP diminished in 2005 Taiwanese local elections. Campaigning on a "save Taiwan from corruption" platform, the KMT-led pan-blue coalition won 16 of 23 county and town offices and became the majority party at the local level. Chen was charged with corruption after stepping down as president in 2008.
