= 2013 Kuomintang chairmanship election =

- 20 July 2013
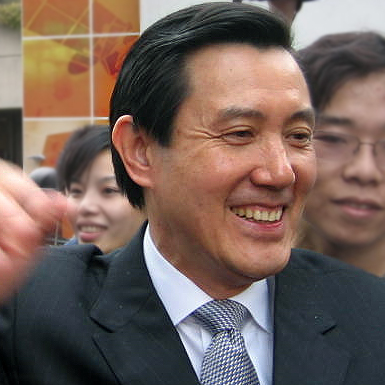
Nominee	Ma Ying-jeou
Popular vote	202,750
Percentage	100%
Chairman before election
Ma Ying-jeou
Elected Chairman
Ma Ying-jeou

The 2013 Kuomintang chairmanship election (Chinese: 2013年中國國民黨主席選舉) was held on 20 July 2013 in Taiwan with Ma Ying-jeou as the sole candidate. This was the fifth direct election of the chairman in the Kuomintang history. All registered, due-paying KMT party members were eligible to vote.

== Result ==
Candidate	Party	Votes	%
Ma Ying-jeou	Kuomintang	202,750	100.00
Total		202,750	100.00
Valid votes		202,750	91.85
Invalid/blank votes		17,996	8.15
Total votes		220,746	100.00
Registered voters/turnout		381,548	57.86

== See also ==
- Elections in the Republic of China
- List of leaders of the Kuomintang
- September 2013 power struggle
