= Lee Teng-hui =

President of the Republic of China from 1988 to 2000

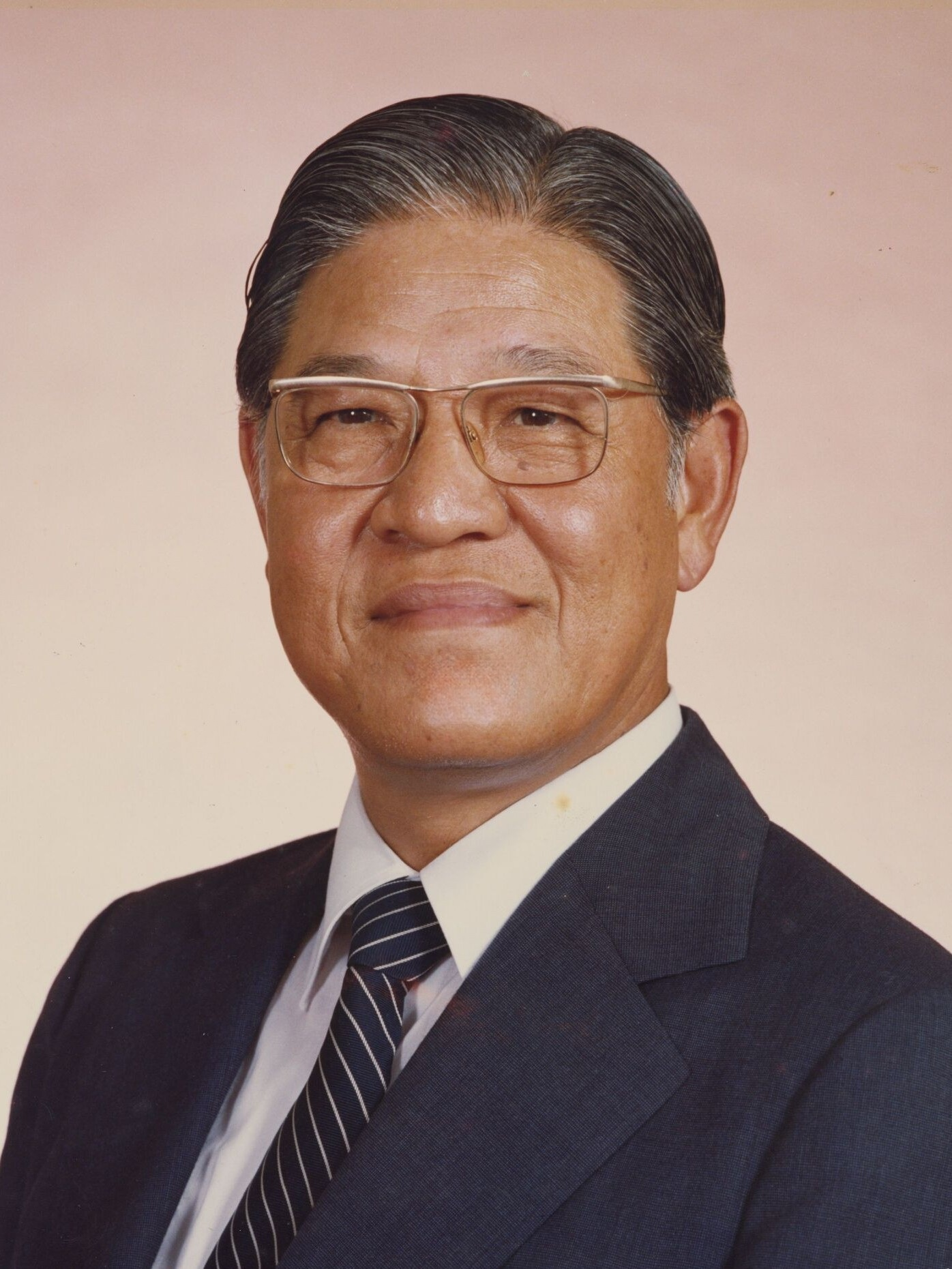
- Official portrait

4th President of the Republic of China
- In office 13 January 1988 – 20 May 2000
- Premier: See list: Yu Kuo-hwa Lee Huan Hau Pei-tsun Lien Chan Vincent Siew
- Vice President: Lee Yuan-tsu; Lien Chan
- Preceded by: Chiang Ching-kuo
- Succeeded by: Chen Shui-bian

5th Vice President of the Republic of China
- In office 20 May 1984 – 13 January 1988
- President: Chiang Ching-kuo
- Preceded by: Hsieh Tung-min
- Succeeded by: Lee Yuan-tsu

2nd Chairman of the Kuomintang
- In office 27 July 1988 – 24 March 2000; Acting: 13 January 1988 – 27 July 1988
- Preceded by: Chiang Ching-kuo
- Succeeded by: Lien Chan

11th Chairman of Taiwan Provincial Government
- In office 5 December 1981 – 20 May 1984
- President: Chiang Ching-kuo
- Preceded by: Lin Yang-kang
- Succeeded by: Liu Chao-tien (acting); Chiu Chuang-huan

4th Mayor of Taipei
- In office 9 June 1978 – 5 December 1981
- Preceded by: Lin Yang-kang
- Succeeded by: Shao En-hsin (邵恩新)

Minister without Portfolio
- In office 2 June 1972 – 1 June 1978
- Premier: Chiang Ching-kuo

Personal details
- Born: 15 January 1923 Sanshi, Taihoku, Taiwan, Empire of Japan
- Died: 30 July 2020 (aged 97) Beitou, Taipei, Taiwan
- Resting place: Wuzhi Mountain Military Cemetery
- Citizenship: Japan (until 1945); Republic of China (from 1945)
- Party: Chinese Communist Party (1946–1948); Kuomintang (1971–2001); Independent (after 2002)
- Spouse: Tseng Wen-hui (m. 1949)
- Children: 3
- Education: Kyoto University (BEc); National Taiwan University (BS); Iowa State University (MA); Cornell University (PhD)
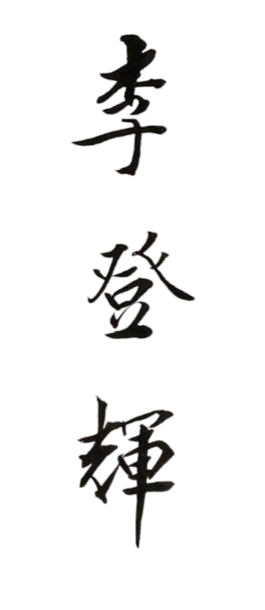
- Signature

Military service
- Allegiance: Empire of Japan
- Branch/service: Imperial Japanese Army
- Years of service: 1944–1945
- Rank: Second lieutenant
- Battles/wars: Second World War; Pacific theatre

Chinese name
- Traditional Chinese: 李登輝
- Simplified Chinese: 李登辉
Transcriptions
Standard Mandarin
- Hanyu Pinyin: Lǐ Dēnghuī
- Bopomofo: ㄌㄧˇ ㄉㄥ ㄏㄨㄟ
- Gwoyeu Romatzyh: Lii Denghuei
- Wade–Giles: Li^{3} Têng^{1}-hui^{1}
- Tongyong Pinyin: Lǐ Denghuei
- MPS2: Lǐ Dēng-huēi
- IPA: [lì tə́ŋ.xwéɪ]
Hakka
- Romanization: Lí Tên-Fî
Yue: Cantonese
- Jyutping: lei^{5} dang^{1}fai^{1}
Southern Min
- Hokkien POJ: Lí Teng-hui
- Tâi-lô: Lí Ting-hui

Japanese name
- Kanji: 岩里政男
- Kana: いわさと まさお
Transcriptions
- Romanization: Iwasato Masao

Lee Teng-hui (Chinese: 李登輝; pinyin: Lǐ Dēnghuī; 15 January 1923 – 30 July 2020) was a Taiwanese politician, economist, and agronomist who served as the fourth president of the Republic of China and chairman of the Kuomintang from 1988 to 2000. He was the first president born in Taiwan, the first to be directly elected, and also the last to be indirectly elected.

Born in Taihoku Prefecture, Lee was raised under Japanese rule. He was educated at Kyoto Imperial University and served in the Imperial Japanese Army during World War II before graduating from National Taiwan University. He then studied agricultural economics in the United States, where he earned his doctorate from Cornell University in 1968, beginning a career as an economics professor. As a member of the Kuomintang (KMT), he was appointed Mayor of Taipei in 1978 and became governor of Taiwan Province in 1981 under President Chiang Ching-kuo. Lee succeeded Chiang as president after Chiang's death in 1988.

During his presidency, Lee oversaw the end of martial law in Taiwan and led reforms to democratize the Republic of China. He was an advocate of the Taiwanese localization movement, sought to establish greater international recognition of the country, and has been credited as the president who completed Taiwan's democratic transition. After leaving office, he remained active in Taiwanese politics as a major influence on the pro-independence Taiwan Solidarity Union (TSU), and recruited for the party in the past. After Lee campaigned for TSU candidates in the 2001 Taiwanese legislative election, he was expelled by the KMT. His post-presidency was also marked by efforts to maintain greater relations between Taiwan and Japan.

== Early life ==
Lee was born on 23 January 1923, in the rural farming community of Sanshi Village near the fishing and trading town of Tamsui (now Tamsui District). He was of Hakka Chinese descent, with his ancestral home in Yongding, Tingzhou. His grandfather was a village leader in Sanshi and his father, Li Chin-lung, was a policeman who graduated from a Japanese police academy, owned land, and oversaw an irrigation service while working for the colonial Japanese government. Lee's mother also came from a local landowning family. He had an older brother, Lee Teng-chin (李登欽), who joined the colony's police academy, volunteered for the Imperial Japanese Navy, and was killed in action in the Philippines; Teng-chin's body is interned at the controversial Yasukuni Shrine in Japan.

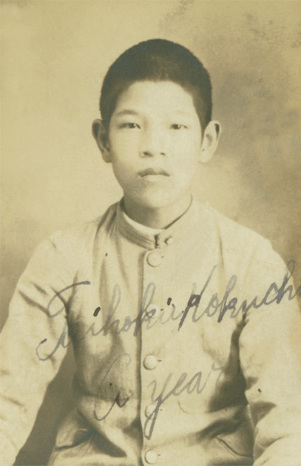
Lee in 1937

When he was three years old, Lee and his brother were sent by their grandfather, Li Tsai-sheng, to a school which taught Chinese and Japanese; they were required to memorize Confucian and Chinese classics, including the Three Character Classic. Because his father, working in Taihoku Prefecture, was often transferred to different police precincts, Lee became a pupil at four different elementary schools in Xizhi (Hsi-chih), Nangang, Sanshi, and Tamsui. In 1929, while attending the Hsi-chih Common School, where most teachers were Japanese, he was selected as the class leader (head boy) and was considered one of the most outstanding students out of 47 pupils. He learned Chinese calligraphy and Japanese history before being transferred eventually to the Tamsui Common School, where he graduated in March 1935, ranked second out of 104 students. He sat the entrance examinations and applied to Taipei's top middle schools, but was rejected twice as the schools prioritized Japanese enrollment. He continued studying for the examinations at a juku and, in 1937, enrolled in the private Kuo-min Middle School (now Datong High School) in Taipei in 1938. A classmate, Lin Kai-pi, recalled: "He was very diligent and rarely played with us. Though he was taciturn, he was congenial and honest. He seemed to be blessed with a retentive memory. Fifteen years after our graduation, I could no longer recognize him, but he still called me by my name".

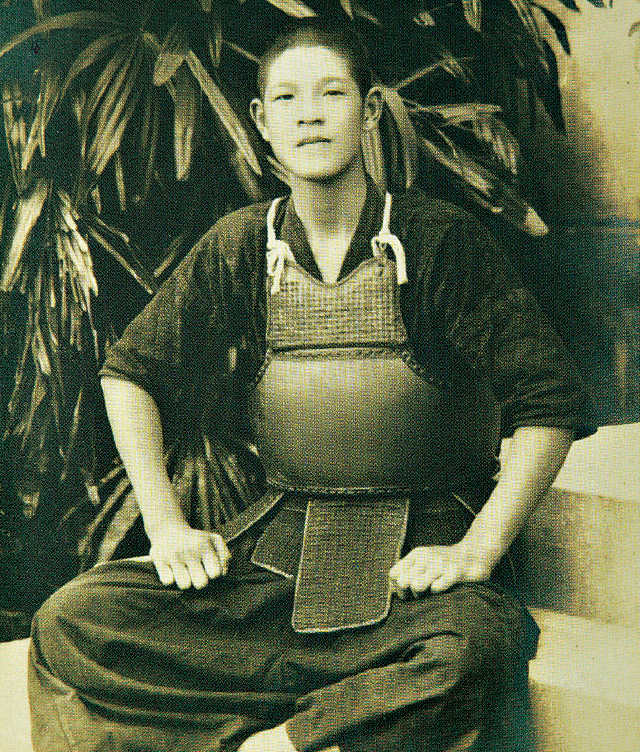
Lee as a junior high school student wearing kendo armor

As a child, Lee learned Zen Buddhism, developed an interest in Western classical music, and read Western philosophy—including transcendentalist works, Friedrich Nietzsche, and Johann Wolfgang von Goethe—in Japanese translations. In 1935, the Japanese colonial government reformed educational institutions in accordance with wartime demands of "Shintoism, state (kokutai), and indoctrination". As part of these reforms, Tamsui Middle School established a dojo for Japanese martial arts; Lee trained in calisthenics, judo, kendo, and attended weekly military drills. He performed exceptionally and was chosen to carry the school's hinomaru as the top student of his class. By 1940, the Kōminka movement and increasing pressure to Japanize led Lee's father to give the family Japanese names in place of their Chinese names. Teng-chin took the name Iwasato Takenori (岩里武則) and Teng-hui Iwasato Masao (岩里政男). (Note: This name was suggested by Lee Teng-chin, combining Longyan (龍岩), where their family originated, and their surname Lee (李), which shares the same pronunciation with the character "里" in both Japanese on'yomi and Chinese.) Lee later recalled that, until he was 22 years old, he "always considered himself a Japanese".

Lee graduated from Tamsui in 1941, completing his courses in four years as opposed to the usual five. He was admitted to continue his studies at the prestigious Taihoku Higher School (now National Taiwan Normal University), a Japanese-dominated higher school established in 1925 to send students for specialized studies at a college or university. Most students were sons of high-ranking Japanese officials or professionals; Taiwanese students that were able to gain admission were considered the best in Taiwan. Lee, one of only four Taiwanese students in his class, decided to study agricultural economics with the intent to work at the Southern Manchuria Railway Company after graduation. It normally took three years for a student to complete all the required courses but accelerated curriculum changes during World War II meant that he completed examinations after only two.

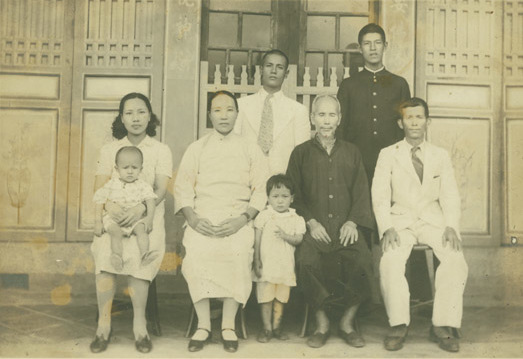
Lee (top right) posing with his family before leaving to attend college

Lee was a versatile student who was "an intense, tireless and voracious reader, with wide-ranging interests". Although he wanted to pursue his favorite subject, history, as a history teacher, he chose economics for better career prospects. He studied Japanese culture extensively and read the Kojiki, revered emperor Hirohito, and idolized Japanese historian Motoori Norinaga (author of the Kojiki-den), and colonial apologist Nitobe Inazō, whose 1899 Bushido: The Soul of Japan deeply influenced him. He also read The Pillow Book, The Tale of Genji, and was especially influenced by The Tale of the Heike and shosetsu works by Japanese writer Jirō Abe (1883–1959) and Hyakuzō Kurata. His favorite autobiographical novelist was Natsume Sōseki. In addition, he read Japanese translations of T. E. Lawrence, The Evolution of Physics, and the treatises of Immanuel Kant (translated by Kitaro Nishida). By the time he arrived at Taihoku High School, Lee owned a collection of more than 700 volumes of books published by Iwanami Shoten. He graduated from Taihoku with honors.

=== Education in Japan and World War II ===
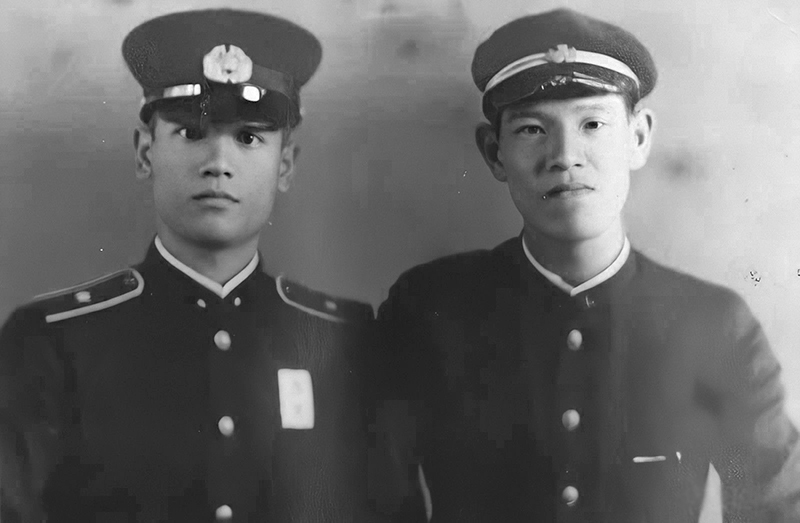
Lee (right) with his elder brother, Lee Teng-chin (left), in 1943

With the Pacific War escalating, Lee left Taiwan to attend college in Japan and took the highly competitive Japanese college entrance exam in the summer of 1943. Despite having to score significantly higher than most Japanese students to be considered, Lee was admitted to Kyoto Imperial University and was awarded a scholarship, a great honor for a Taiwanese student. He sailed to Japan and enrolled in the university's Faculty of Agriculture, which was considered the leading department of its field in the country at the time. He was especially interested in Karl Marx, Marxian economics, and admired Marxist economist Hajime Kawakami, whose philosophy influenced much of the faculty at Kyoto, and Thomas Carlyle. He took multiple courses in German (his preferred foreign language) and English, but continued to rely on Japanese translations for reading Carlyle, Goethe, and Faustian literature. He was a student at Kyoto Imperial University for 14 months between 1943 and 1944 before the war and mass mobilization in Japan interrupted his studies.

Lee left Kyoto to volunteer for service in the Imperial Japanese Army as one of 36 Taiwanese volunteers from the Kansai region. In December 1944, he was sent back to Taiwan to be stationed at an anti-aircraft unit in Kaohsiung. He then was ordered to return to Japan in January 1945 to train at an anti-aircraft military academy in Chiba Prefecture. While sailing back to Japan, he stayed briefly in Japanese-occupied Qingdao—his first time setting foot in mainland China. Once in Japan, he studied radar operation and trained alongside kamikaze pilots as a member of the academy's eleventh class, graduating in April 1945 with the rank of second lieutenant. He was stationed at Nagoya and witnessed the city's bombing. According to biographer Shih-shan Tsai: "instead of shooting down enemy aircraft, all he could and did do was to bring the wounded to the hospital, help children and the elderly evacuate to the country from Nagoya, drill civilian volunteers in fighting with bamboo spears, and dig pillboxes along Ise Bay to prepare for an American invasion".

When the Surrender of Japan was announced, Lee was discharged from Nagoya and traveled to Tokyo, where he met with other Taiwanese students. Beginning in October 1945, when prominent Japanese Communists Maruyama Masao, Hisao Ōtsuka, and Fukutake Tadashi were released from prison and reformed the Japanese Communist Party, Lee and other Taiwanese students began a renewed interest in Communist literature. Lee read multiple Japanese translations of Marx's Das Kapital and went to Tokyo Station to welcome Communist leader Sanzō Nosaka's return from China and Russia. He re-enrolled at Kyoto University and graduated in 1946.

=== Return to Taiwan ===
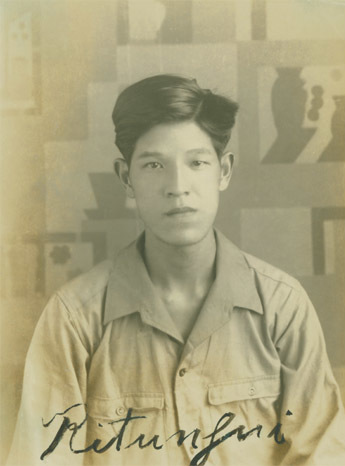
Lee in 1947, a student in the Department of Agricultural Economics at National Taiwan University

In the spring of 1946, Lee left Japan, returning to Taiwan in March on an American liberty ship. With the Retrocession of Taiwan transferring governance of the island to the Republic of China, the Ministry of Education allowed all Taiwanese students previously enrolled in the Imperial Universities to enroll at National Taiwan University (NTU; previously Taihoku Imperial University), which Lee did, joining the university's Department of Agricultural Economics as one of its only two students. He had two professors, one of whom was Hsu Ching-chung, who later served as vice premier. At the same time, he developed an interest in Chinese literature, particularly the works of Hu Shih, Guo Moruo, and Lu Xun. His worldview was also influenced by reading Fyodor Dostoevsky's The Idiot. He continued an interest in Marxism, joining a Marxist study club at NTU and writing his undergraduate thesis, "A Study of the Problems of Taiwan’s Agricultural Labor," by applying Marxist class struggle and surplus labour theories. He briefly joined the Chinese Communist Party (CCP) twice—once in September 1946 and again in either October or November 1947—but withdrew his membership both times.

Following the recommendation of communist youth leader Wu Ke-tai, Lee joined the New Democracy Association, a secret communist group, in October 1947, but withdrew six months later in June 1948. Members of both the New Democracy Association and the Marxist study club were later arrested in May 1950. (Note: The New Democracy Association was later absorbed by the CCP.) Lee's close association with Taiwanese communist groups as a student became the subject of scrutiny later in life. In 1969, he was arrested by KMT secret police but was released after a series of investigations and interrogations. Years later, in 2002, Lee recalled the reason for joining communist groups as being "out of a young man's naive vision for his country".

== Economist and professor (1949–1971) ==
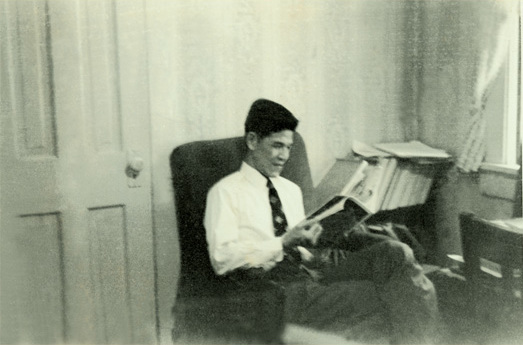
Lee in his dormitory at Iowa State University, 1953

When tensions between the government and Taiwanese natives escalated in the 1947 February 28 incident, Lee survived by rooming with friends and opening a bookstore on Zhongshan Road. He overcame an initially poor comprehension of Mandarin Chinese (Guoyu) to graduate from National Taiwan University in the summer of 1949 with a bachelor's degree in agricultural economics. After graduation, he applied for and won a one-year scholarship offered by the United States Department of State to study in the U.S. He chose to attend Iowa State University, completing seven courses there in accounting, economic statistics, and agricultural marketing. He received his Master of Arts in agricultural economics in 1953. Upon returning to Taiwan, he was appointed a lecturer at National Taiwan University and taught undergraduate courses in banking, marketing, finance, and plant pathology as a popular teacher among students. To supplement his salary, he first worked as a technician at the Ministry of Agriculture then, in 1954, as a research fellow at the Taiwan Cooperative Bank.

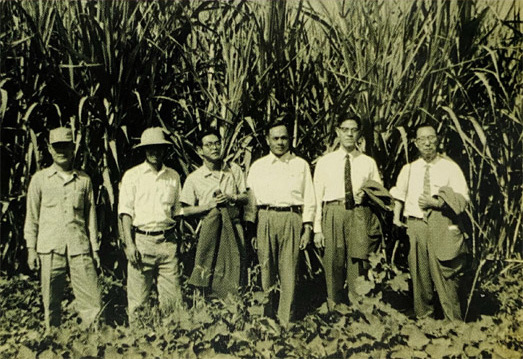
Lee (second from right) with Japanese agronomists inspecting a sugarcane farm in 1955

In 1957, Lee began a career as an economist, senior specialist, and consultant on the Joint Commission on Rural Reconstruction (JCRR), a U.S.-sponsored commission to modernize Taiwan's agricultural system. He was eventually appointed a project head of the JCRR's Division of Rural Economics under economist Hsieh Sam-chung, and began publishing in international academic agriculture journals under the name "T. H. Lee" while continuing to teach at NTU as a professor. He also taught at the Graduate School of East Asian Studies at National Chengchi University. In 1965, the Rockefeller Foundation awarded Lee a scholarship to pursue doctoral studies at Cornell University; he departed Taiwan for the U.S. in September, enrolling in Cornell's College of Agriculture and Life Sciences.

Lee spent his first two years at Cornell studying agricultural finance, econometrics, quantitative analysis, developmental economics, production economics, food distribution, and public policy. He divided his time between the School of Applied Economics and Management, Olin Library, and the Albert R. Mann Library. Economics professor Kenneth L. Robinson described Lee as "very reserved, very able and very conscientious". Bernard F. Stanton, a professor of agricultural economics at Cornell, recalled: "Lee’s great strength was in his intellectual capacity and his ideas. He was very serious, and he came to Cornell with specific ideas on what he wanted to accomplish with his thesis". Another professor, Daniel G. Sisler, recalled: "He wouldn’t be out playing volleyball with other graduate students or down at a bar in Collegetown. He was very quiet, very studious and personally dedicated to his work and to Taiwan. I gave him an A in a course on research methods, and I don’t give out many A’s". John Williams Mellor, who supervised Lee's doctoral dissertation, remembered Lee as "a very mature, thoughtful student with an absolutely first-rate analytical mind".

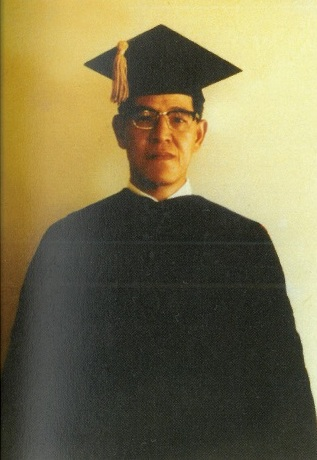
Lee in his doctoral academic dress at Cornell University, 1968

Among Lee's classmates at Cornell was the activist Peter Huang, who attempted to assassinate Chiang Ching-kuo in 1970. Because of his connections to Taiwanese communists, Huang, and a friendship with independence activist Peng Ming-min, Lee was placed on a KMT blacklist. While studying in the U.S., he observed the Vietnam War protests and the civil rights movement, both of which influenced his views on democratizing Taiwan.

In June 1968, Lee graduated from Cornell and earned his Ph.D. in agricultural economics with honors. His doctoral dissertation, "Intersectoral Capital Flows in the Economic Development of Taiwan, 1895–1960," won the American Agricultural Economics Association's award for the most outstanding thesis of the year in 1969. With the backing of Professor Mellor and the Rockefeller Foundation, the dissertation was published by Cornell University Press as a 201-page monograph in 1971. The university later established an endowed professorship, the Lee Teng-hui Professorship of World Affairs, in Lee's honor in 1994.

== Rise to power ==
By 1970, Lee was a well-known agricultural economist, particularly among colleagues at the Joint Commission on Rural Reconstruction and at National Taiwan University. One of his colleagues and close friends, the high-ranking KMT official Wang Tso-jung, introduced Lee to general Wang Sheng, who in turn arranged a meeting between Lee and Chiang Ching-kuo to address potential methods to improve agriculture in Taiwan. The meeting proved pivotal for Lee, who impressed Chiang; Wang urged him to join the KMT in the summer of 1970 and enter government service. Lee did so in July 1970, being sworn in as a member of the Kuomintang at the KMT Central Committee in Taipei with Wang and his wife as witnesses. When Chiang Ching-kuo succeeded Chiang Kai-shek as premier on 1 June 1972, he appointed Lee as a minister without portfolio in the Executive Yuan responsible for agricultural development on 2 June. But, unaware of the appointment, Lee had been preparing to accept a postdoctoral research position at Cornell, which he eventually chose to withdraw in order to accept Chiang's appointment. At 49 years old, he was sworn in as Chiang's youngest cabinet minister.

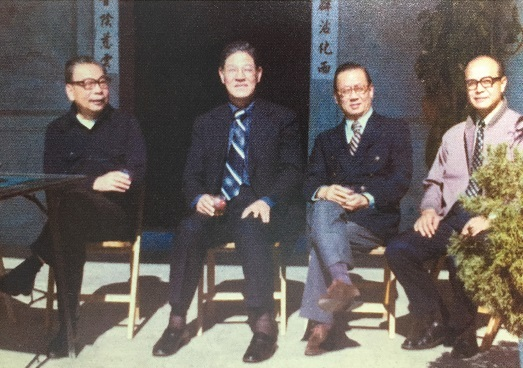
Lee sitting with President Chiang Ching-kuo (left), 1975

As a new minor cabinet official, Lee was largely ignored by high-ranking officials but gradually began to exercise greater discretion over agricultural affairs since the country lacked a ministry of agriculture. Among the projects Chiang tasked Lee with was his "Ten Major Development Projects", which aimed to achieve economic success by developing transportation, industrialization, and agricultural productivity. During the 1970s, Lee was responsible for overseeing that agricultural development complimented Chiang's industrial growth projects. He advocated for greater funding for schools, rural running water systems, and published over 100 papers on agricultural development in Taiwan. Lee described his role as "a position to recommend policies designed to secure the livelihood of farmers, who constituted the overwhelming majority of the population, and at the same time ensure the smooth progress of industrialization. My basic approach was a combination of Sun Yat-sen’s idea about ‘distribution of the rights of landownership’ and T. W. Schultz’s warning not to isolate agriculture from the nonagricultural sectors".

The death of Chiang Kai-shek on 5 April 1975, initiated a power vacuum that saw Yen Chia-kan elected president and Ching-kuo made head of the powerful Central Standing Committee of the KMT. Three years later, Ching-kuo succeeded Yen as president and, following Chiang's recommendation, Premier Sun Yun-suan appointed Lee Mayor of Taipei on 9 June 1978. He solved water shortages and improved the city's irrigation problems. In 1981, he became governor of Taiwan Province and made further irrigation improvements.

As a skilled technocrat, Lee received the attention of President Chiang Ching-kuo as a strong candidate to serve as vice president. Chiang sought to move more authority to the benshengren (residents of Taiwan before 1945 and their descendants) instead of continuing to promote waishengren (Chinese immigrants who arrived in Taiwan after 1945 and their descendants) as his father had. President Chiang nominated Lee to become his Vice President. Lee was formally elected by the National Assembly in 1984.

== Presidency (1988–2000) ==
Chiang Ching-kuo died in January 1988, and Lee Teng-hui succeeded him as president. Within the KMT, debates soon emerged over Lee’s succession to the party chairmanship. Palace Faction figures, notably General Hau Pei-tsun, Premier Yu Kuo-hwa and former first lady Soong Mei-ling, expressed reservations toward Lee’s leadership, while KMT Secretary-General Lee Huan supported Lee's appointment as chairman, viewing it as a necessary move to counter Yu's growing influence. With the help of James Soong—himself a member of the Palace Faction—who quieted the hardliners with the famous plea "Each day of delay is a day of disrespect to Ching-kuo," Lee was allowed to ascend to the chairmanship unobstructed. At the 13th National Congress of Kuomintang in July 1988, Lee named 31 members of the Central Committee, 16 of whom were benshengren: for the first time, benshengren held a majority in what was then a powerful policy-making body. On 20 March, he ordered the release of political prisoner Gen. Sun Li-jen from 33 years of house arrest. In August, he listened to the aboriginal legislator Tsai Chung-han's advocacy in the General Assembly of Legislative Yuan and the journalism reportage of Independence Evening Post on the human rights' concern to release the remaining survivors of the civilian Tanker Tuapse free after 34 years in captivity. Lee Teng-hui also intervened in the selection of the vice president of the Legislative Yuan that year, replacing the hardliner Chao Tzu-chi, who was supported by Legislative Yuan presidential candidate Liu Kuo-tsai, with the more moderate Liang Su-yung. Two years later, Liang succeeded Liu as president of the Legislative Yuan.

While Lee Teng-hui is credited with advancing Taiwan's democratization, his tenure was also marked by controversies surrounding black gold politics and populism. The term "black gold politics" refers to the involvement of organized crime in local politics, leading to corruption and the entanglement of political figures with criminal elements. This phenomenon has been linked to populist policies that, while appealing to the masses, sometimes overlooked institutional integrity and governance standards. Critics argue that these issues not only compromised the political environment but also hindered effective governance during Lee's administration.

As he consolidated power during the early years of his presidency, Lee allowed his rivals within the KMT to occupy positions of influence: when Yu Guo-hwa retired as premier in 1989, he was replaced by Lee Huan, who was succeeded by Hau Pei-tsun in 1990. At the same time, Lee made a major reshuffle of the Executive Yuan, as he had done with the KMT Central Committee, replacing several elderly waishengren with younger benshengren, mostly of technical backgrounds. Fourteen of these new appointees, like Lee, had been educated in the United States. Prominent among the appointments were Lien Chan as foreign minister and Shirley Kuo as finance minister.

On 11 February 1990, the KMT convened an extraordinary Central Committee meeting that formally nominated Lee Teng-hui and Lee Yuan-tsu as the party's candidates for president and Vice President. During the session, Li Huan immediately raised his hand in opposition to the acclamation vote, arguing that the nomination should be decided by secret ballot rather than unanimous applause. Lin Yang-kang subsequently supported Li's proposal, requesting that the chairman suspend the meeting to print ballots and hold a vote in the afternoon to determine whether the decision would be made by standing acclamation or by secret ballot.

Their remarks were widely interpreted as a public break with Lee Teng-hui. However, meeting chairperson Hsieh Tung-min refused to adjourn and promptly proceeded with the acclamation vote. Because Li Huan, Lin Yang-kang, and Hau Pei-tsun had openly advocated a ballot vote, their actions were seen as revealing the intentions of the so-called “non-mainstream faction” to challenge Lee's leadership. The confrontation also led many Central Committee members to refrain from opposing Lee, reportedly out of fear of “unpredictable political consequences.” Of the 180 Central Committee members present, 99 voted in favor of proceeding by acclamation, while 70 supported a ballot vote. This power struggle is known as February Political Struggle

In early March 1990, a group of National Assembly delegates led by Teng Chie attempted to nominate former Judicial Yuan President Lin Yang-kang for the presidency, with General Chiang Wei-kuo, as his running mate. The proposed "Lin–Chiang ticket" represented conservative discontent within the Kuomintang against Lee's leadership. Although a mobilization meeting was held at the Tri-Service Officers’ Club, where anti-Lee pamphlets were circulated accusing him of being sympathetic to communism, both Lin and Chiang declined to actively campaign. Lin later announced his withdrawal on 9 March, followed by Chiang's statement of “advancing and retreating together.” The challenge quickly collapsed, consolidating Lee's authority within the party and clearing the path for his election as president.

1990 saw the arrival of the Wild Lily student movement on behalf of full democracy for Taiwan. Thousands of Taiwanese students demonstrated for democratic reforms. The demonstrations culminated in a sit-in demonstration by over 300,000 students at Memorial Square in Taipei. Students called for direct elections of the national president and vice president and for a new election for all legislative seats. On 21 March, Lee welcomed some of the students to the Presidential Building. He expressed his support of their goals and pledged his commitment to full democracy in Taiwan.

In May 1991, Lee spearheaded a drive to eliminate the Temporary Provisions Effective During the Period of Communist Rebellion, laws put in place following the KMT arrival in 1949 that suspended the democratic functions of the government. In December 1991, the original members of the Legislative Yuan, elected to represent Chinese constituencies in 1948, were forced to resign and new elections were held to apportion more seats to the benshengren. The elections forced Hau Pei-tsun from the premiership, a position he was given in exchange for his tacit support of Lee. He was replaced by Lien Chan, then an ally of Lee.

The prospect of the first island-wide democratic election the next year, together with Lee's June 1995 visit to Cornell University, sparked the Third Taiwan Strait Crisis. The United States had not prepared the PRC for Lee receiving a United States visa. While in the United States, Lee stated, "Taiwan is a country with independent sovereignty."

The PRC conducted a series of missile tests in the waters surrounding Taiwan and other military maneuvers off the coast of Fujian in response to what Communist Party leaders described as moves by Lee to "split the motherland". The PRC government launched another set of tests just days before the election, sending missiles over the island to express its dissatisfaction should the Taiwanese people vote for Lee. In 1996, the United States sent two aircraft carrier groups to Taiwan's vicinity and the PRC then de-escalated. The military actions disrupted trade and shipping lines and caused a temporary dip in the Asian stock market.

Lee's overall stance on Taiwanese independence during the election cycle was characterized as "deliberately vague".

The previous eight presidents and vice presidents of the ROC had been elected by the members of the National Assembly. For the first time, the President of the ROC would be elected by majority vote of Taiwan's population. On 23 March 1996, Lee became the first popularly elected ROC president with 54% of the vote. Many people who worked or resided in other countries made special trips back to the island to vote. In addition to the president, the governor of Taiwan Province and the mayors of Taipei and Kaohsiung (as leaders of provincial level divisions they were formerly appointed by the president) became popularly elected.

1996 Taiwanese presidential election Result
President Candidate	Vice President Candidate	Party	Votes	%
Lee Teng-hui	Lien Chan	Kuomintang	5,813,699	54.0
Peng Ming-min	Frank Hsieh	Democratic Progressive Party	2,274,586	21.1
Lin Yang-kang	Hau Pei-tsun	Independent	1,603,790	14.9
Chen Li-an	Wang Ching-feng	Independent	1,074,044	9.9
Invalid/blank votes			117,160	
Total			10,883,279	100

Lee, in an interview that same year, expressed his view that a special state-to-state relationship existed between Taiwan and the People's Republic of China (PRC) that all negotiations between the two sides of the Strait needed to observe. PRC leadership interpreted this statement to mean that Taiwan would take efforts toward independence and consequently the remark increased Cross-Strait tensions.

As president, he attempted to further reform the government. Controversially, he attempted to remove the provincial level of government and proposed that lower level government officials be appointed, not elected.

Lee, observing constitutional term limits he had helped enact, stepped down from the presidency at the end of his term in 2000. That year, Democratic Progressive Party candidate Chen Shui-bian won the national election with 39% of the vote in a three-way race. Chen's victory marked an end to KMT rule and the first peaceful transfer of power in Taiwan's new democratic system.

Supporters of rival candidates Lien Chan and James Soong accused Lee of setting up the split in the KMT that had enabled Chen to win. Lee had promoted the uncharismatic Lien over the popular Soong as the KMT candidate. Soong had subsequently run as an independent and was expelled from the KMT. The number of votes garnered by both Soong and Lien would have accounted for approximately 60% of the vote while individually the candidates placed behind Chen. Protests were staged in front of the KMT party headquarters in Taipei. Fuelling this anger were the persistent suspicions following Lee throughout his presidency that he secretly supported Taiwan independence and that he was intentionally sabotaging the Kuomintang from above. Lee resigned his chairmanship on 24 March.

During his presidency, Lee supported the Taiwanese localization movement. The Taiwanization movement has its roots in Japanese rule founded during the Japanese era and sought to put emphasis on vernacular Taiwanese culture in Taiwan as the center of people's lives as opposed to Nationalist China. During the Chiang era, China was promoted as the center of an ideology that would build a Chinese national outlook in a people who had once considered themselves Japanese subjects. Taiwan was often relegated to a backwater province of China in the KMT-supported history books. People were discouraged from studying local Taiwanese customs, which were to be replaced by mainstream Chinese customs. Lee sought to turn Taiwan into a center rather than an appendage. In 1997, he presided over the adoption of the Taiwan-centric history textbook Knowing Taiwan.

== South China Sea dispute ==
Under Lee, it was stated that "legally, historically, geographically, or in reality", all of the South China Sea and Spratly islands were the territory of the Republic of China and under ROC sovereignty, and denounced actions undertaken there by Malaysia and the Philippines, in a statement on 13 July 1999 released by the foreign ministry of Taiwan. The claims made by both the PRC and the Republic of China "mirror" each other. During international talks involving the Spratly islands, the PRC and ROC have sometimes made efforts to coordinate their positions with each other since both have the same claims.

== Post-presidency ==
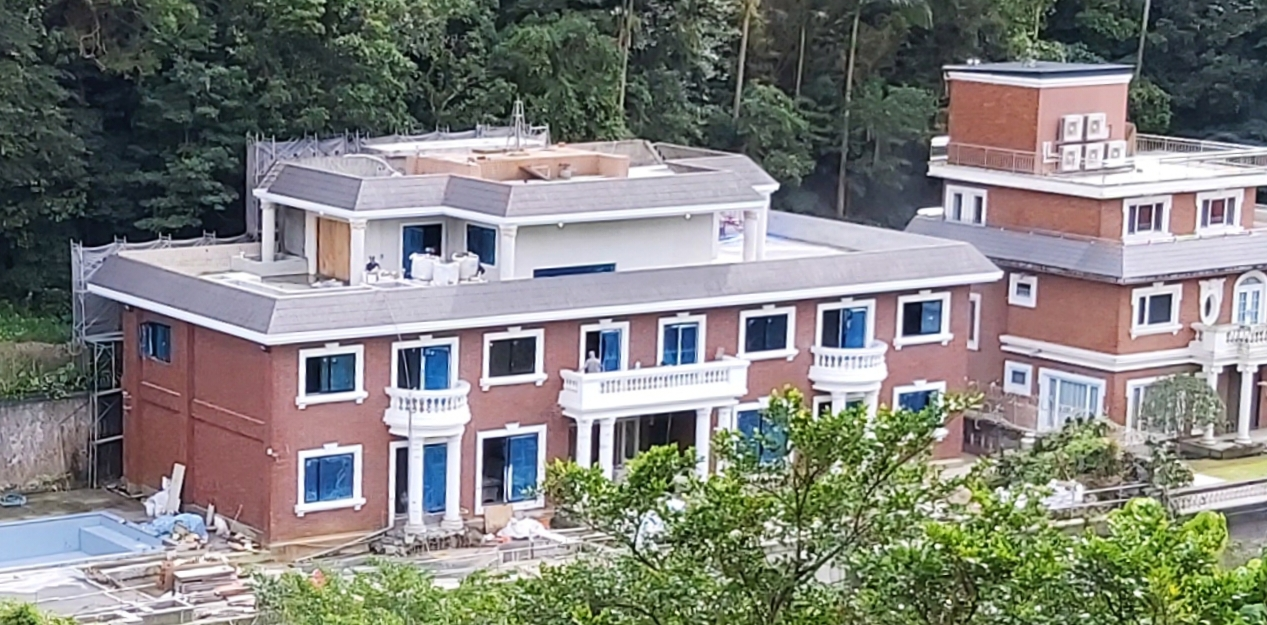
Cuishan Zhuang, Lee Teng-hui's former residence in Taipei.

Since resigning the chairmanship of the KMT, Lee stated a number of political positions and ideas which he did not mention while he was president, but which he appeared to have privately maintained. After Lee endorsed the candidates of the newly formed Pan-Green Taiwan Solidarity Union, a party established by a number of his KMT allies, Lee was expelled from the KMT on 21 September 2001.

Lee publicly supported the Name Rectification Campaigns in Taiwan and proposed changing the name of the country from the Republic of China to the Republic of Taiwan. He generally opposed unlimited economic ties with the PRC, placing restrictions on Taiwanese wishing to invest in China.

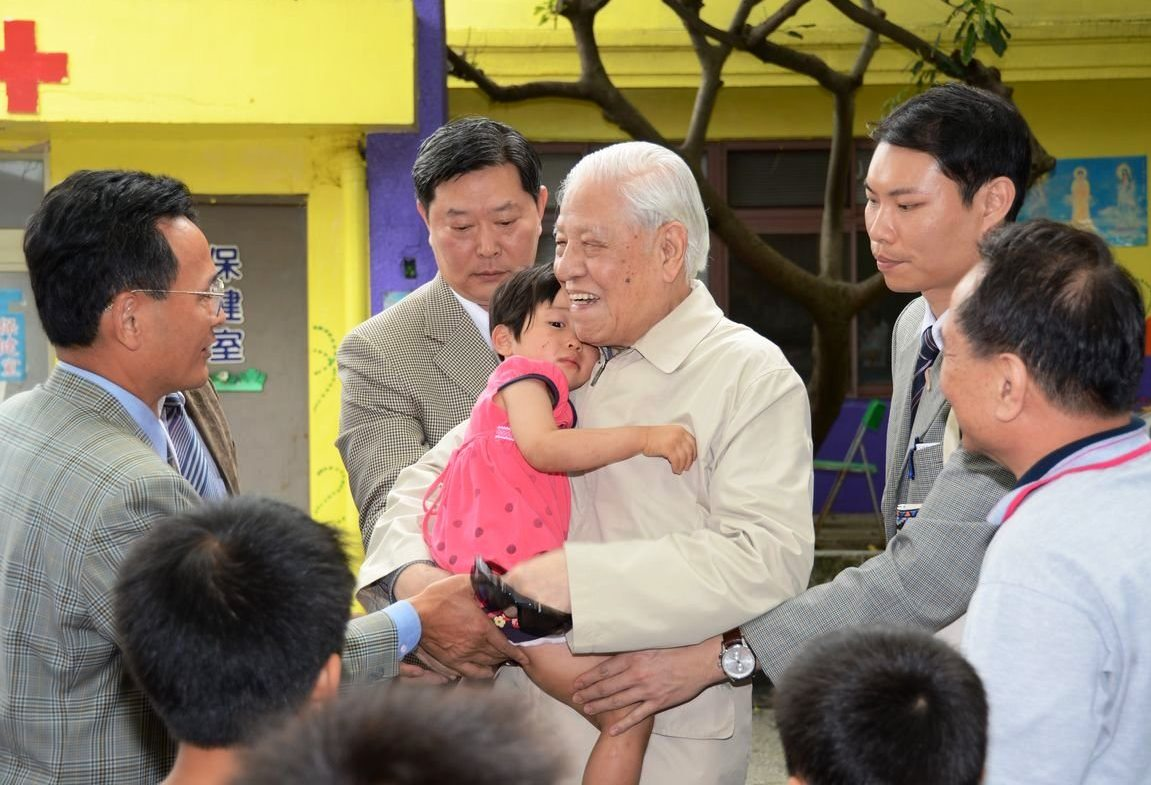
Lee visiting an orphanage in Dayuan District, Taoyuan City in 2013

After Chen Shui-bian succeeded Lee in the 2000 election, the two enjoyed a close relationship despite being from different political parties. Chen regularly asked Lee for advice during his first term in office. In Chen's 2001 book, he called Lee the "Father of Taiwanese Democracy" and also named himself the "Son of Taiwan" with respect to Lee. However, the two's relationship began to worsen when Lee questioned Chen's reform of the fisheries branch of the Council of Agriculture. Though Lee was present in the 228 Hand-in-Hand rally orchestrated by the Pan-Green Coalition before the 2004 election, the two's relationship broke apart after Chen asked James Soong to be the President of the Executive Yuan in 2005, which Lee disagreed with. Lee also publicly criticized Chen in 2006 by calling him incapable and corrupt.

In February 2007, Lee shocked the media when he revealed that he did not support Taiwanese independence, when he was widely seen as the spiritual leader of the pro-independence movement. Lee also said that he supported opening up trade and tourism with China, a position he had opposed before. Lee later explained that Taiwan already enjoys de facto independence and that political maneuvering over details of expressing it is counterproductive. He maintains that "Taiwan should seek 'normalization' by changing its name and amending its constitution."

=== Relations with Japan ===
Lee enjoyed a warm relationship with the people and culture of Japan. Lee spoke fondly of his upbringing and his teachers and was welcomed in visits to Japan since leaving office. Lee admired and enjoyed all things Japanese such as traditional Japanese values. This was the target of criticism from the Pan-Blue Coalition in Taiwan, as well as from China, due to the anti-Japanese sentiment formed during and after World War II. However, this animosity fell in later years, especially in Taiwan.

In 1989, he received the highest distinction of the Scout Association of Japan, the Golden Pheasant Award.

In August 2001, Lee said of Japanese Prime Minister Junichiro Koizumi's controversial visit to Yasukuni Shrine, "It is natural for a premier of a country to commemorate the souls of people who lost their lives for their country." In a May 2007 trip to Japan, Lee visited the shrine himself to pay tribute to his elder brother. Controversy rose because the shrine also enshrines World War II Class A criminals among the other soldiers.

During the 2012 China anti-Japanese demonstrations, on 13 September 2012, Lee remarked, "The Senkaku Islands, no matter whether in the past, for now or in the future, certainly belong to Japan." Ten years previously, he had stated, "The Senkaku Islands are the territory of Japan." In September 2014, Lee expressed support for a Japanese equivalent to the United States' Taiwan Relations Act, which was discussed in the Japanese Diet in February, though the idea was first proposed by Chen Shui-bian in 2006.

In 2014, Lee said in the Japanese magazine SAPIO published by Shogakukan, "China spreads lies such as Nanjing Massacre to the world ... Korea and China use invented history as their activity of propaganda for their country. Comfort women is the most remarkable example." In 2015, Lee said "The issue of Taiwanese comfort women is already solved" in the Japanese magazine Voice (published by PHP Institute). He was strongly criticized by Chen I-hsin, spokesman of the Presidential Office as "not ignorant but cold-blooded". Chen added, "If Lee Teng-hui really thinks the issue of comfort women is solved, go to a theater and see Song of the Reed."

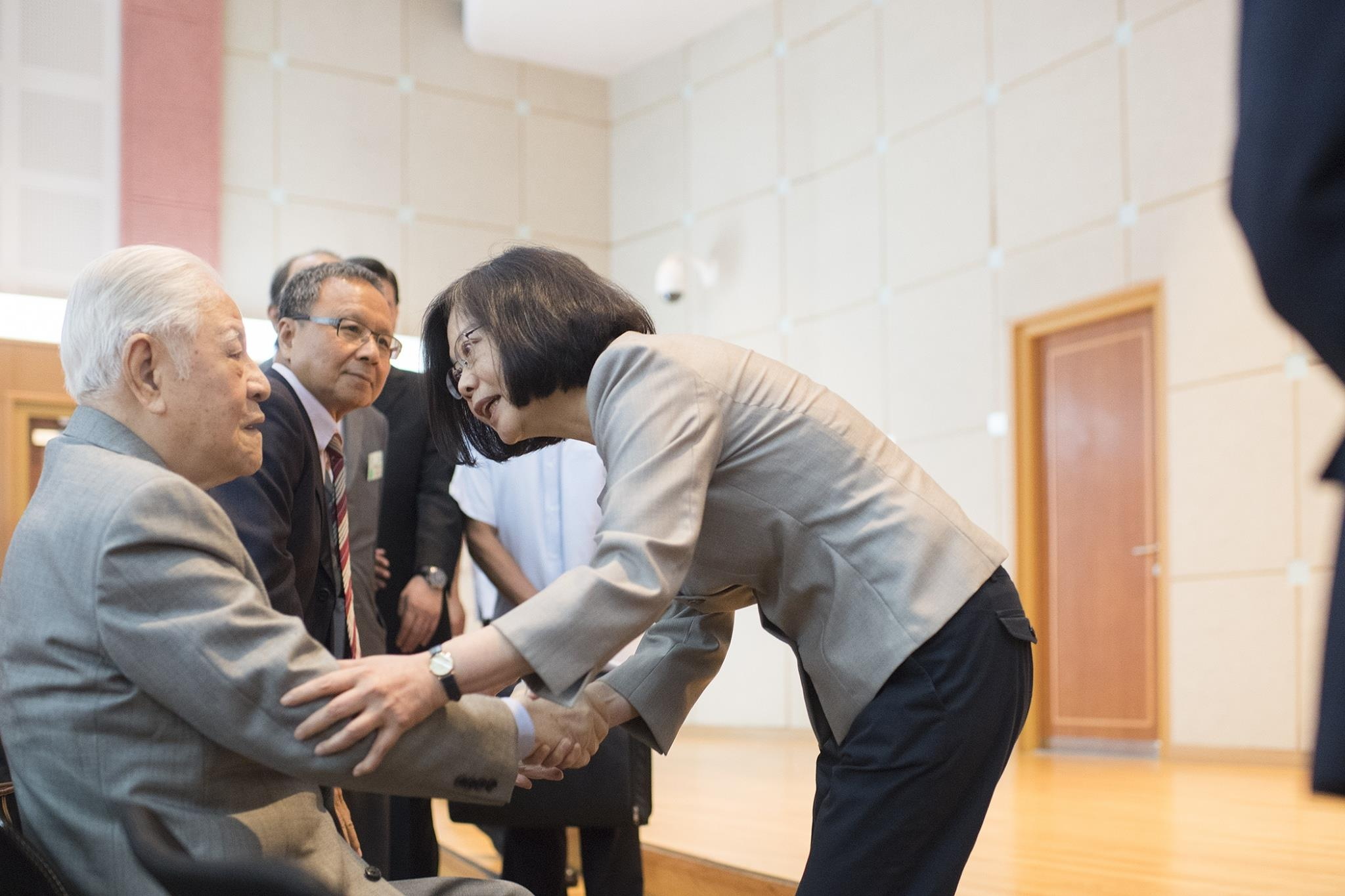
Lee meeting Taiwanese President Tsai Ing-wen in 2016

In July 2015, Lee visited Japan, and again stated that Japan has full sovereignty over the Senkaku Islands. This was the first time Lee made remarks of this nature while in Japan. Members of the pan-Blue New Party and Kuomintang accused him of treason. New Party leader Yok Mu-ming filed charges of treason against Lee, while the KMT's Lai Shyh-bao called a caucus meeting to seek revisions to the Act Governing Preferential Treatment for Retired Presidents and Vice Presidents, aimed at denying Lee privileges as a former president.

In 2015, at an interview in Japan, Lee remarked that during the Japanese colonial period, Taiwan and Japan constituted 'one country,' and that he and his brother enlisted because they once regarded Japan as their 'motherland.' These comments drew substantial criticism from both the Pan-Blue Coalition and from authorities in mainland China. Later Lee also remarked that he felt sorrowful that Taiwanese people were "slaves" of the Japanese. In response to media requests for comment, then presidential candidate Tsai Ing-wen said that “each generation and ethnic group in Taiwan has lived a different history,” and that people should approach these differing experiences and interpretations with an attitude of understanding that will allow for learning from history, rather than allowing it to be used a tool for manipulating divisions.

Lee published a book, Remaining Life: My Life Journey and the Road of Taiwan's Democracy, in February 2016. In it, he reasserted support for Japanese sovereignty claims over the Senkaku Islands, drawing complaints from the ROC Presidential Office, President-elect Tsai Ing-wen, and Yilan County fishermen.

On 22 June 2018, he visited Japan for the final time in his life.

=== Controversies and indictment ===
On 30 June 2011, Lee, along with former KMT financier Liu Tai-ying were indicted on graft and money-laundering charges and accused of embezzling US$7.79 million in public funds. He was acquitted by the Taipei District Court on 15 November 2013. Prosecutors appealed the ruling, but on 20 August 2014, Lee was cleared of the charges again.

== Comments and criticism ==
In 1997, Huang Kuang-kuo, a psychology professor at National Taiwan University, published A Theory of Populism Leading to Taiwan’s Demise (民粹亡臺論), in which he argued that the political climate under Lee Teng-hui was characterized by what he termed populist democracy. Huang described it as a hybrid formation resulting from the fusion of traditional East Asian political culture with Western-style democratic institutions—a political monstrosity, in his words, that operated in the name of democracy but in practice through the violence of majority rule.

Huang used the term “populism” in an unusually broad sense, encompassing what he identified as phenomena such as money politics, local “strongman” rule by criminal factions, and an entrenched bureaucratic patronage culture, which he argued had become deeply rooted in Taiwanese politics during Lee Teng-hui’s presidency. According to Huang, Lee’s brand of populism operated on the premise that “as long as the votes are secured, anything becomes legitimate”: national identity could be redefined, the constitutional structure dismantled, party loyalties traded away, and legal accountability denied. He described Taiwan as entering “a process of collective suicide under populism,” one in which past achievements were repudiated and future development obstructed, producing only “a dictator who manipulates public opinion.” Huang further contended that Taiwan had become vulnerable to waves of collective emotional pressure, leading to distorted outcomes in areas such as education reform, the planning of high-speed rail, and financial-sector restructuring, all of which he attributed to populist politics overriding rational governance.

Criticism of Lee Teng-hui was not limited to the KMT camp. Independence activist Chuang Fang-hua (莊芳華), in her book Deconstructing Lee Teng-hui (1995), offered a sharp critique of Lee’s political conduct, arguing that he “lacked the courage to appoint principled and capable officials, instead continuing to rely on the servile bureaucrats of the Chiang family regime.” She accused Lee of “recklessly issuing political promises during local elections, misusing state resources to reward local power brokers, and aligning himself with wealthy factions to consolidate his personal influence.” Chuang further contended that Lee’s approach “encouraged the rise of underworld figures and uneducated local strongmen, resulting in a coarse and vulgar political culture within the national legislature.”

In October 2001, veteran journalists Lu Keng and Ma Xiping published Surely You Are Joking, Mr. Teng-hui, a collection of interviews with twelve political and public figures associated with Lee Teng-hui, including James Soong, Lien Chan, Lin Yang-kang, Hau Pei-tsun, Lee Yuan-tseh, and Tsai Ing-wen.

According to Lu, the project was conceived as a response to Lee's own earlier memoir-like volume The Confession of Lee Teng-hui’s Administration (李登輝執政告白實錄), published five months prior, in which Lee openly criticized several of his former political allies. Questioning the accuracy and tone of those accounts, Lu and Ma conducted follow-up interviews with the individuals mentioned to record their recollections and perspectives.

James Soong criticized Lee's policy of “streamlining the Taiwan Provincial Government” (commonly known as 精省), arguing that the measure “reduced administrative efficiency” and had been implemented “without prior consultation” with him, despite his position as the elected Governor of Taiwan Province. Nevertheless, Soong also emphasized, “Mr. Lee truly treated me like a son. The degree of trust and reliance he placed on me is beyond what outsiders can imagine.”

In his interview, former Premier and Chief of the General Staff Hau Pei-tsun challenged Lee Teng-hui's reputation as “Mr. Democracy,” accusing him of undermining institutional procedures and concentrating decision-making within his inner circle. Hau recounted that while he served as both Chief of the General Staff and later as Premier, Lee “often bypassed proper channels in joint decision-making, especially in national security matters, by directly consulting with his confidant, National Security Bureau Director Sung Hsin-lien.” Hau also alleged that Lee frequently made key political appointments — such as selecting Lien Chan as Governor of Taiwan Province and appointing Huang Ta-chou as Mayor of Taipei — without consulting him as Premier, instead simply notifying him after the decisions had been made.

Hau stated: “The resignation of a cabinet must be approved by the Central Standing Committee — that is self-evident. The appointment or removal of senior party officials has always required its consent, let alone something as significant as a cabinet’s resignation. Lee Teng-hui ignored even the Central Standing Committee; his personal dictatorship was beyond doubt.” Hau also remarked that Lee and James Soong's decision to replace secret balloting with applause-based approval during key party meetings represented “the worst example of democracy.”

In reflecting on his tenure, Hau remarked: “Lee Teng-hui said I was a black sheep? When I was Premier, law and order improved, the economy grew, the stock market soared, and black-gold virtually disappeared — these are facts. It was Lee Teng-hui who lost political power, encouraged corruption, and crashed the stock market. Who, then, was the real black sheep?” Hau expressed deep concern that Taiwan's democratization had fostered a culture of political cynicism, observing that “in the process of democratic reform, both ruling and opposition parties have come to see rumor, falsehood, defamation, and slander as normal tools of politics, eroding public trust and leaving society to believe that democracy is merely a struggle for power where moral values and social ethics no longer matter.”

Hau further accused Lee of deliberately shaping public opinion by portraying non-mainstream faction figures such as Lin Yang-kang, Hau Pei-tsun, and Lee Huan as members obstructing his administration. Hau rejected this characterization, stating that he had in fact cooperated closely with Lee, adding, “If we had truly wanted to bring Lee Teng-hui down, he would have been gone long ago.”

The interview with Lin Yang-kang focused on persistent rumors that in 1990, Lee had persuaded Lin and his running mate Chiang Wei-kuo to withdraw from the presidential race, allegedly promising not to seek re-election in 1996. Lin confirmed that Lee had indeed conveyed such an intention through intermediary Tsai Hung-wen but maintained that his withdrawal was primarily due to persuasion by senior party elders, including Huang Shao-ku, Hsieh Tung-min, Yuan Shou-chien, and Tsai Hung-wen, who wished to avoid internal division. Lin also stated that Lee's earlier memoir contained “numerous factual inaccuracies.”

A 2003 master’s thesis by De-Hui Yin of National Chengchi University analyzed Lee Teng-hui’s political discourse through the framework of populism. Yin argues that Lee framed “democracy” and “democratic reform” not only as universal political ideals but also as tools for reshaping public perception and consolidating personal authority. According to the study, Lee repeatedly invoked the discourse of democracy to: (1) justify constitutional changes that expanded presidential power, (2) construct a charismatic moral leadership image to neutralize criticism from both the Chinese Communist Party and domestic rivals, and (3) appeal to a Taiwan-centered collective identity by portraying the PRC as a hostile external threat. Yin concludes that although Lee’s administration did not rely on overt repression, his rhetorical strategies nevertheless facilitated a concentration of power in the presidency, displaying what the thesis characterizes as a “populist mode of governance.”

== Personal life ==
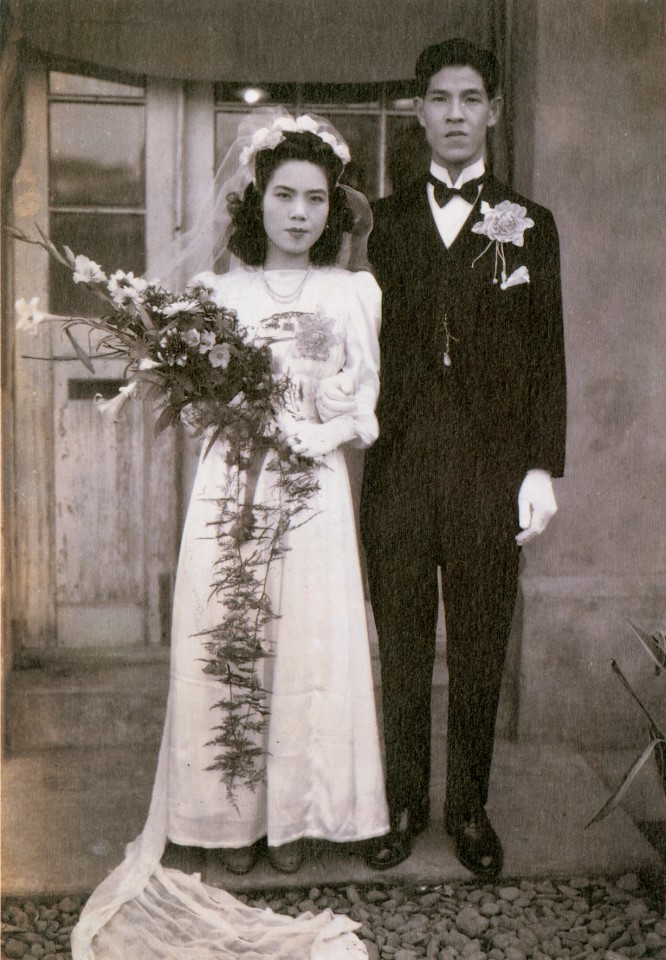
Newlyweds Lee Teng-hui and Tseng Wen-hui in front of a National Taiwan University dormitory

Lee and his wife were Presbyterian Christians. Lee encountered Christianity as a young man and in 1961 was baptised. For most of the rest of his political career, despite holding high office, Lee made a habit of giving sermons at churches around Taiwan, mostly on apolitical themes of service and humility. He was a member of the Presbyterian Church in Taiwan.

Lee's native language was Taiwanese Hokkien but his heritage language was Taiwanese Hakka, for he was fluent in the former but a basic speaker of the latter as he is of Yongding Hakka ancestral descent. He was proficient in Mandarin, fluent in Japanese and was able to speak English well. According to an editorial published in Asiaweek, he spoke Japanese better than Mandarin.

=== Family ===
Lee married Tseng Wen-hui on 9 February 1949, with whom he had three children. Their firstborn son Lee Hsien-wen (c. 1950 – 21 March 1982) died of sinus cancer. Daughters Anna and Annie, were born c. 1952 and c. 1954, respectively.

=== Health ===
Shortly after stepping down from the presidency in 2000, Lee had coronary artery bypass surgery. In late 2011, he underwent surgery to remove stage II colon adenocarcinoma, the most common form of colon cancer. Two years later, he had a stent implanted in his vertebral artery following an occlusion. Lee was sent to Taipei Veterans General Hospital in November 2015 after experiencing numbness in his right hand, and later diagnosed with a minor stroke. On 29 November 2018, he was rushed to Taipei Veterans General Hospital after falling and hitting his head. He was discharged from hospital on 31 January 2019, and President Tsai Ing-wen later visited him at his home. On 8 February 2020, Lee was hospitalised at Taipei Veterans General Hospital after choking while drinking milk and retained in the hospital under observation due to lung infection concerns. Later, he was diagnosed with aspiration pneumonia caused by pulmonary infiltration, and was subsequently intubated.

=== Death ===
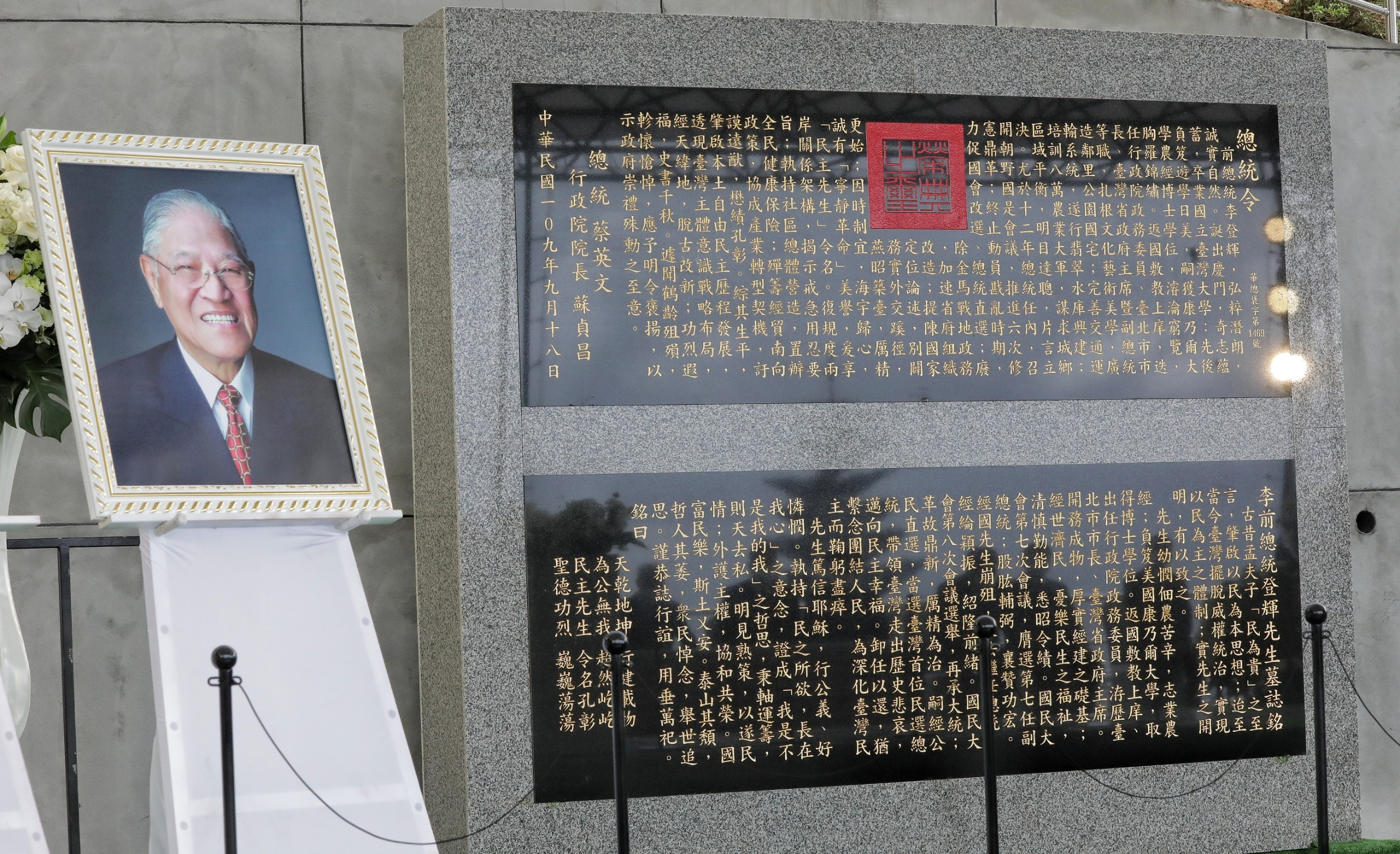
Epitaph of Lee Teng-hui at the Wuzhi Mountain Military Cemetery

Lee died of multiple organ failure and septic shock at Taipei Veterans General Hospital on 7:24 pm, 30 July 2020, at the age of 97. He had suffered from infections and cardiac problems since he was admitted to hospital in February.

A state funeral was announced, while a memorial venue at the Taipei Guest House where people paid respects to Lee was opened to the public from 1 to 16 August 2020, after which Lee's body was cremated and his remains interred at Wuzhi Mountain Military Cemetery. All national flags at government institutions were placed at half-mast for three days.

== Legacy ==
For his efforts to democratise the Taiwanese government, Lee was given the nickname "Mr. Democracy" and referred to as Taiwan's "Father of Democracy".

A November 2020 phone survey of 1,076 Taiwan citizens aged 18 and above which asked the question: "Which president, after Taiwan's democratisation, do you think has the best leadership? Lee Teng-hui, Chen Shui-bian, Ma Ying-jeou, or Tsai Ing-wen?" revealed Lee topped the survey with 43 percent, with incumbent president Tsai on 32 percent, Ma on 18 percent and 6.6 percent for Chen.

The Democratic Progressive Party (DPP), a Taiwanese nationalist party, viewed Lee positively and regarded him as "a beacon of hope". The DPP had grown in strength under Lee's rule and he set a precedent by presiding over the first ever peaceful transition of power to an opposition party in 2000. Conversely, Kuomintang figures held Lee responsible for destroying the party-state system and causing the party's fragmentation, and highlight his past membership in the Chinese Communist Party.

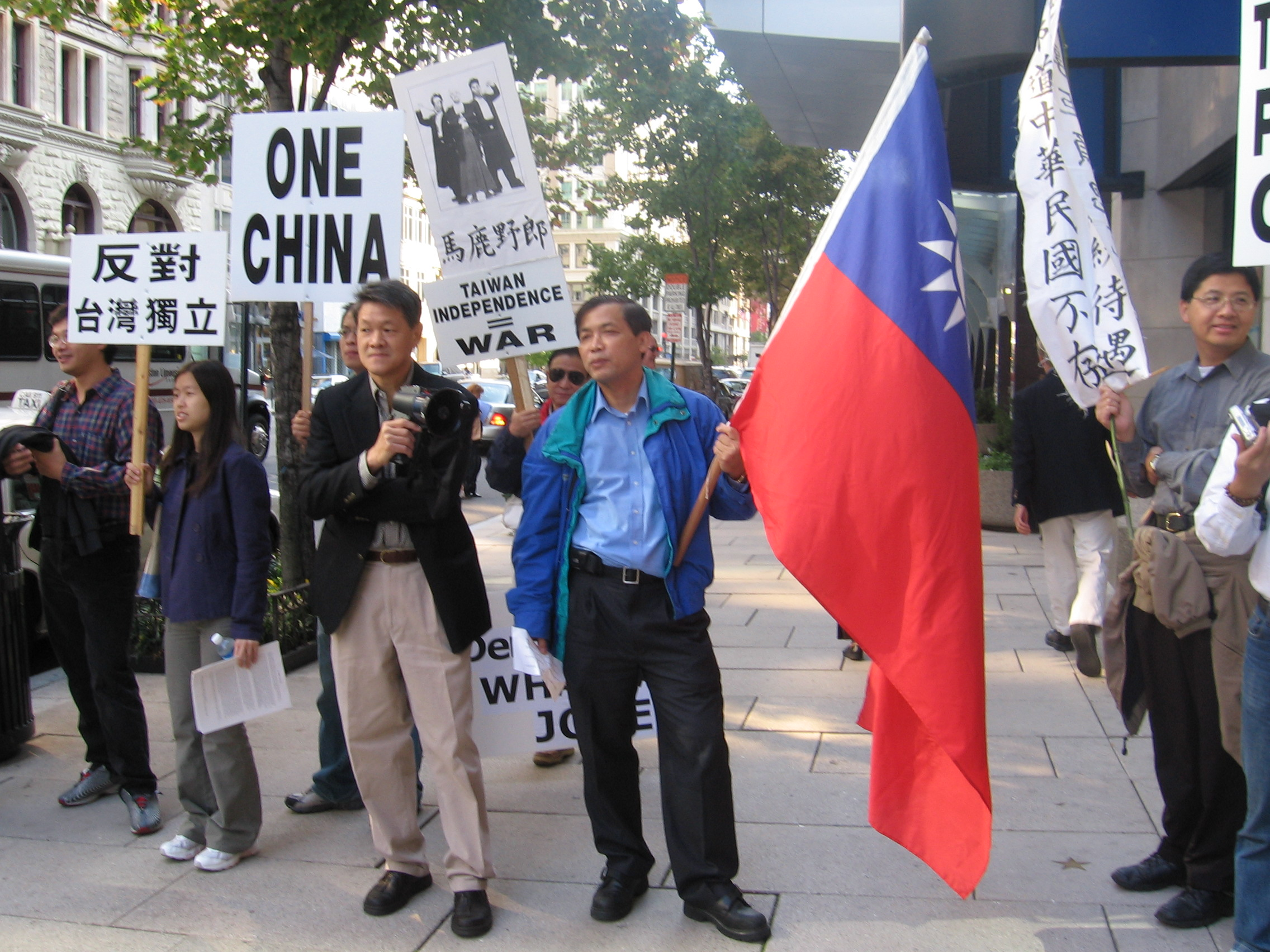
Taiwanese diaspora at a pro-unification protest in Washington, D.C. against Lee Teng-hui's visit in 2005, calling Lee a baka-yarō.

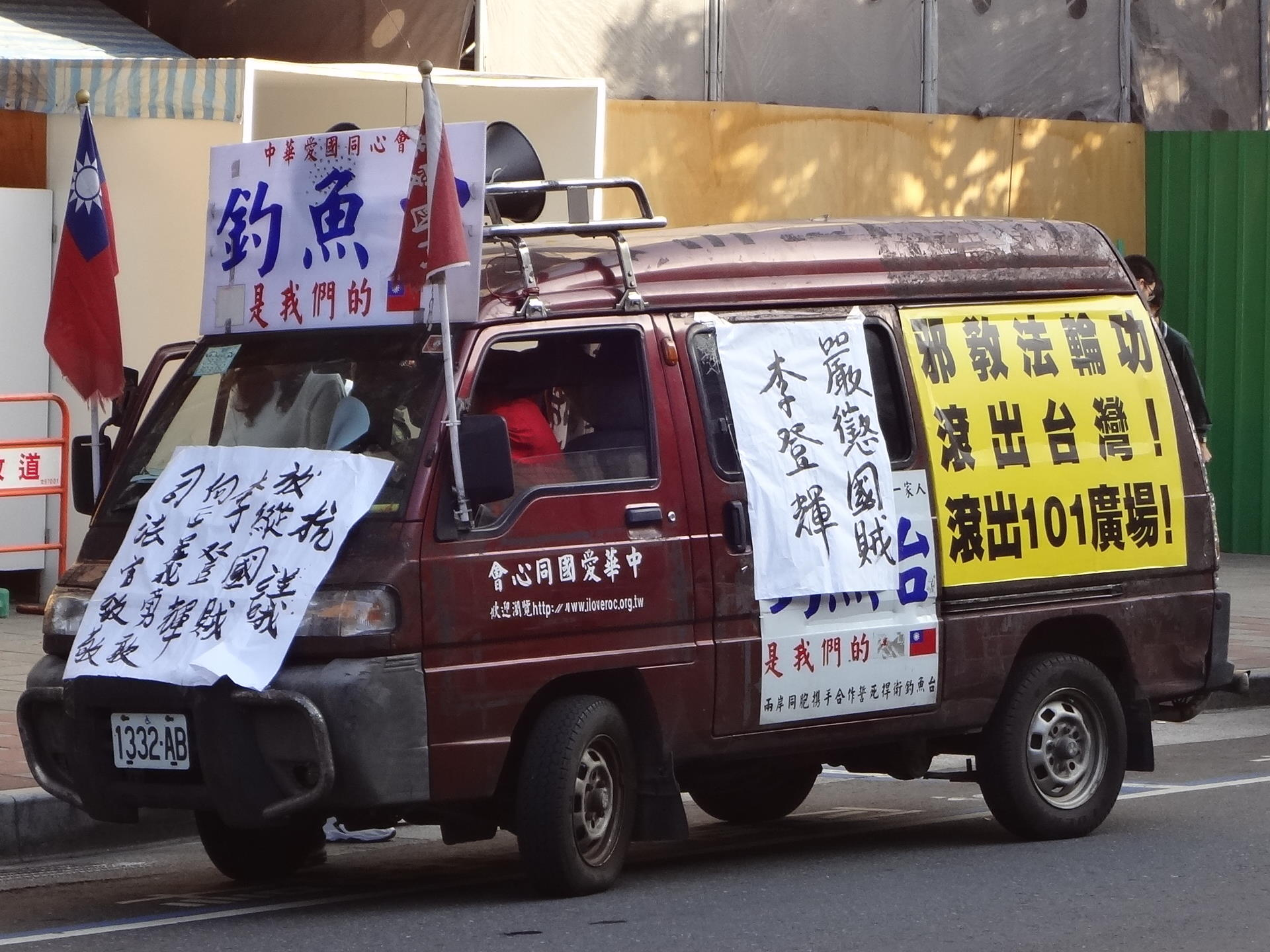
A sound truck belonging to the Chinese nationalist Patriot Alliance Association, with anti-Lee slogans.

Among Chinese nationalists in both mainland China and Taiwan, Lee is a despised figure. His comments glorifying Imperial Japan and denying the Nanjing Massacre were met with sharp criticism in both mainland China and Taiwan. The Taiwan Affairs Office of the People's Republic of China called Lee a hanjian (Chinese traitor), as well as a "sinner of the Chinese race". In 2015, Kuomintang legislators as well as then-incumbent President Ma Ying-jeou accused Lee of treason, branding him as a hanjian. In August 2015, chairwoman Hung Hsiu-chu of the Kuomintang called Lee a "lunatic" for his comments about Taiwan and Japan being one nation. Lin Yu-fang of the Kuomintang further called Lee "the person least qualified to be Taiwanese. He served as a president for 12 years and never said a word for the comfort women, his legacy is stained with blood and tears. You, a running dog of Japan, when have you ever said a word for the poor Taiwanese people?" Legislator Lu Xuechang of the Kuomintang said that "Taiwan does not need traitors who sell out their country". After Lee's death, spokesperson for the Chinese ultranationalist New Party Wang Bingzhong called Lee a "traitor to the Kuomintang and China".

Prime Minister of Singapore Lee Kuan Yew criticised Lee's Taiwan independence statements, commenting that he "underestimated China's desire for reunification".

Lee's comments were also criticised by the liberal opposition within the PRC, with dissident Wang Bingzhang having accused Lee of undermining liberal democracy movements within mainland China.

== Honours ==
- Republic of China:
  - Grand Cordon of the Order of Brilliant Jade

=== Foreign ===
- Burkina Faso:
  - Grand Cross of the Ordre de l'Étalon, formerly National Order of Burkina Faso (July 1994)
- Central African Republic:
  - Grand Cross of the Order of Central African Merit (May 1992)
- Chad:
  - Grand Cross of the National Order of Chad (October 1997)
- Dominican Republic:
  - Grand Cross with Gold Breast Star of the Order of Christopher Columbus (September 1999)
- Gambia:
  - Commander of the Order of the Republic of The Gambia (November 1996)
- Guatemala:
  - Grand Cross of the Order of the Quetzal (September 1985)
- Guinea Bissau:
  - National Order of Merit, Cooperation and Development (October 1990)
- Haiti:
  - Grand Cross of the National Order of Honour and Merit (April 1998)
- Honduras:
  - Grand Cross with Gold Star of the Order of Francisco Morazán
- Liberia:
  - Grand Commander of the Humane Order of African Redemption (November 1997)
- Nicaragua:
  - Grand Cross of the Order of Miguel Larreynaga
- Niger:
  - Grand Cross of the National Order of Niger (June 1994)
- Panama:
  - Collar of the Order of Manuel Amador Guerrero (October 1992)
- Paraguay:
  - Grand Collar of the National Order of Merit (June 1990)
- South Africa:
  - Grand Officer of the Order of Good Hope (November 1991)
  - Grand Cross of the Order of Good Hope (September 1984)

== Selected publications ==
=== Books ===
- Lee, Teng-hui (1971). Intersectoral Capital Flows in the Economic Development of Taiwan, 1895–1960. Cornell University Press. ISBN 978-0-8014-0650-8. OCLC 1086842416.

=== Articles ===
- Lee, Teng-Hui (1993). "The Taiwan Experience and China's Future". World Affairs. 155 (3): 132–134. ISSN 0043-8200. JSTOR 20672353.
- Lee, Teng-Hui (1993). "Building a Democracy for Unification". World Affairs. 155 (3): 130–131. ISSN 0043-8200. JSTOR 20672352.
- Lee, Teng-Hui (1999). "Confucian Democracy: Modernization, Culture, and the State in East Asia". Harvard International Review. 21 (4): 16–18. ISSN 0739-1854. JSTOR 43648967.
- Lee, Teng-hui (1999). "Understanding Taiwan: Bridging the Perception Gap". Foreign Affairs. 78 (6): 9–14. doi:10.2307/20049528. ISSN 0015-7120. JSTOR 20049528.

== Footnotes ==
Political offices
Preceded by Lin Yang-kang	Mayor of Taipei; 9 June 1978–5 December 1981	Succeeded by Shao En-hsin
Preceded by Lin Yang-kang	Governor of Taiwan Province; 5 December 1981–20 May 1984	Succeeded by Chiu Chuang-huan
Preceded by Hsieh Tung-ming	Vice President of the Republic of China; 20 May 1984–13 January 1988	Succeeded by Lee Yuan-tsu
Preceded by Chiang Ching-kuo	President of the Republic of China; 13 January 1988–20 May 2000	Succeeded by Chen Shui-bian
Party political offices
Preceded by Chiang Ching-kuo	Chairman of the Kuomintang; 1988–2000	Succeeded by Lien Chan
New title	Kuomintang nominee for President of the Republic of China; 1996	Succeeded by Lien Chan
