= 10th National Congress of the Kuomintang =

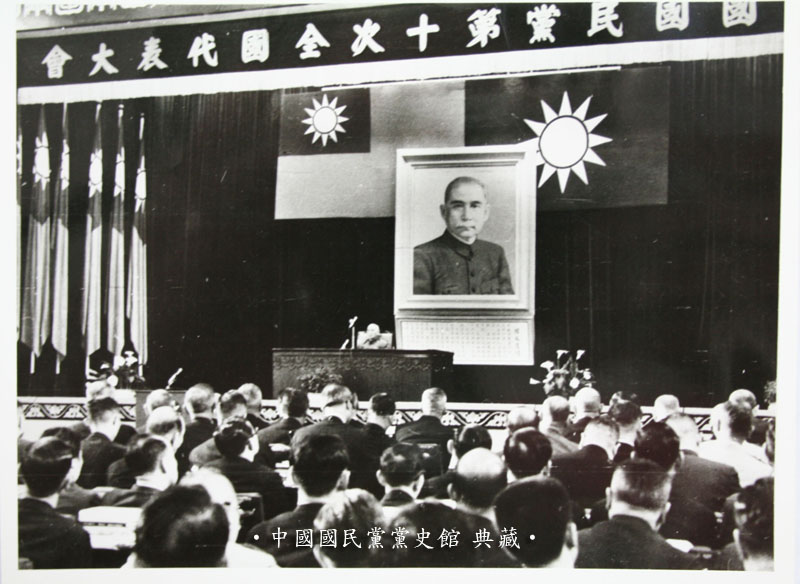
Photo of the platform from the audience at the KMT's 10th National Congress held between 29 March to 9 April, 1969.

The 10th National Congress of the Kuomintang (Chinese: 中國國民黨第十次全國代表大会) was the tenth national congress of the Kuomintang, held between 29 March to 9 April, 1969 in Chung-Shan Building, Beitou District, Taipei, Nationalist China.

== Results ==
KMT Director-General Chiang Kai-shek spoke to more than 1,200 delegates and observers from Taiwan, Mainland China and overseas communities around the world. He provided guidance of discussion and debate. KMT made final plans for the last stage of struggle against Mao Zedong and the Chinese Communist Party (CCP) to liberate the 700 million Chinese in the mainland and to assure peace in Asia and the world.

KMT Secretary-General Chang Pao-shu said that the congress came at a time when the Republic of China was intensifying preparations for the retaking back of the Mainland as the CCP government stood at the brink of collapse due to Great Leap Forward.

A party reform charter was also adopted and a provision providing for a Vice Chairman was scrapped.

== See also ==
- Kuomintang
