= Central Committee of the Kuomintang =

Highest executive body of the Kuomintang

Central Committee of the Kuomintang 中國國民黨中央委員會
- 21st Central Committee of the Kuomintang

Overview
- Type: Political-executive organ
- Elected by: National Congress
- Length of term: Five years
- Term limits: None

History
- Established: by 1st National Congress on January 30, 1924; 102 years ago

Leadership
- General Secretary: Cheng Li-wun, Chair of the Party
- Executive organ: Standing Committee

Elections
- Last election: 21st National Congress (2021)

Meeting place
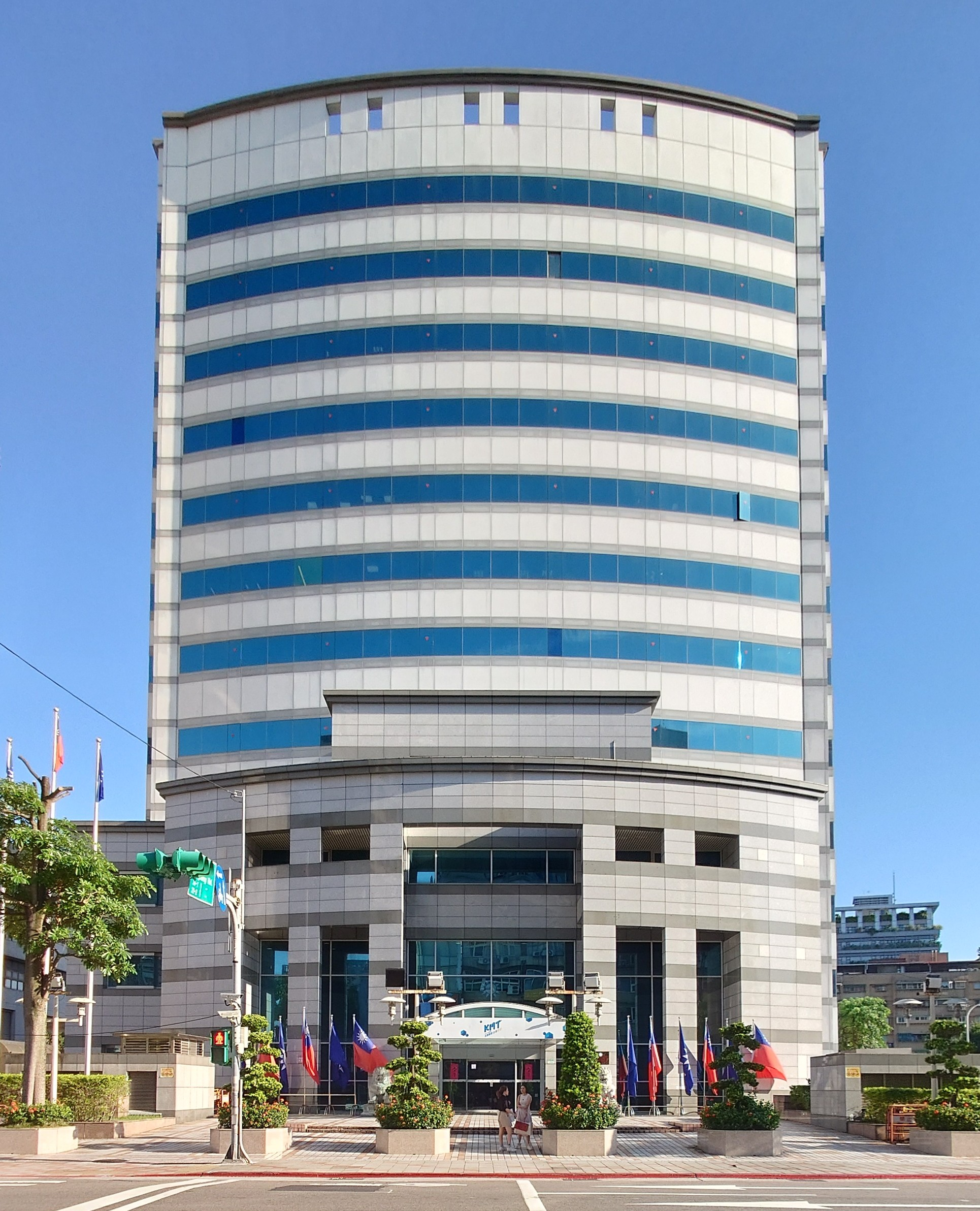
- Zhonglun Bade Building, Taipei

Constitution
- Constitution of the Kuomintang

The Central Committee of the Kuomintang is the highest executive body of the Kuomintang. It is composed of Central Committee members elected by the National Congress. The entire organization includes a group of cadres headed by the chairman and several party affairs units.

The Chairman of the Central Committee is concurrently the Party Chairman, a position directly elected by Party members since 2001. In August 1993, the position of Vice Chairman was added to assist the Chairman. The Central Committee consists of seven departments and two subordinate units, led by the Secretary-General, who are jointly responsible for the day-to-day operations of the Party Central Committee.

The Central Committee has a Standing Committee which performs its duties during the adjournment period of the plenary sessions of the Central Committee and is accountable to it.

== History ==
In January 1924, the First National Congress of the Kuomintang established the Central Executive Committee and the Central Supervisory Committee as the highest executive and supervisory bodies. On October 10, 1952, the Seventh National Congress of the Kuomintang was held. On October 16, the plenary session adopted the book "Basic Theory of Anti-Communism and Anti-Russia" proposed by President Chiang Kai - shek, which was used as the guideline for the Kuomintang's future thoughts, speeches and actions. On October 18, the congress unanimously supported Chiang's re-election as president and adopted the political platform. It also approved Chiang's nomination of 40 people including Wu Jingheng, Yu Youren, Niu Yongjian and Soong Mei-ling as members of the Central Review Committee. It also elected 32 people including Chen Cheng and Chiang Ching-kuo as members of the Central Committee and 16 people including Zheng Jiemin as alternate members of the Central Committee. The congress decided to establish the Central Committee of the Kuomintang and the Central Review Committee of the Kuomintang.

=== List of Central Committees ===
Continental period
Central Committee term	National Congress	Time and location
1st Central Executive Committee	1st National Congress	January 20–30, 1924, Auditorium of Guangdong Normal University, Guangzhou
2nd Central Executive Committee	2nd National Congress	January 1–19, 1926, Guangzhou
3rd Central Executive Committee	3rd National Congress	March 15–28, 1929, Nanjing
4th Central Executive Committee	4th National Congress	November 12–23, 1931, Nanjing
5th Executive Committee	5th National Congress	November 12–23, 1935, Nanjing
5th Executive Committee	Provisional National Congress	March 29–April 1, 1938, National Wuhan University Library, Wuchang
6th Central Executive Committee (Wang Jingwei faction)	6th National Congress (Wang Jingwei faction)	August 28–30, 1939, No. 76, Jessfield Road, Shanghai
6th Central Executive Committee	6th National Congress	May 5–21, 1945, Chongqing
Taiwan period
Central Committee term	National Congress	Time and location
7th Central Committee	7th National Congress	October 10–20, 1952, the Grand Auditorium of Yangmingshan Resort, Yangmingshan, Taipei
8th Central Committee	8th National Congress	October 10–23, 1957, Jieshou Hall, Yangmingshan, Taipei
9th Central Committee	9th National Congress	November 12–22, 1963, Zhongzheng Hall, Joint Staff College, Taipei
10th Central Committee	10th National Congress	March 29 – April 9, 1969, Zhongshan Building, Taipei
11th Central Committee	11th National Congress	November 12–18, 1976, Zhongshan Building, Taipei
12th Central Committee	12th National Congress	March 29 – April 5, 1981, Zhongshan Building, Taipei
13th Central Committee	13th National Congress	July 7–13, 1988, Linkou Gymnasium, Taoyuan County
14th Central Committee	14th National Congress	August 16–22, 1993, Taipei International Convention Center, Taipei
14th Central Committee	Second Session of the 14th National Congress	August 22–23, 1995, Taipei International Convention Center, Taipei
15th Central Committee	15th National Congress	August 25–28, 1997, Taipei International Convention Center, Taipei
15th Central Committee	Second Session of the 15th National Congress	August 28–29, 1999, Taipei International Convention Center, Taipei
15th Central Committee	15th National Congress	June 17–18, 2000, National Dr. Sun Yat-sen Memorial Hall, Taipei
16th Central Committee	16th National Congress	July 29–30, 2001, Linkou Gymnasium, Taoyuan County
16th Central Committee	Second Session of the 16th National Congress	March 30, 2003, the Linkou Gymnasium in Taoyuan County
17th Central Committee	17th National Congress	August 19–20, 2005, National Dr. Sun Yat-sen Memorial Hall, Taipei
17th Central Committee	Second Session of the 17th National Congress	June 24, 2007, Taoyuan County Gymnasium
17th Central Committee	17th National Congress Extraordinary Session	November 22, 2008, National Dr. Sun Yat-sen Memorial Hall, Taipei
18th Central Committee	18th National Congress	October 17, 2009, Taipei County Xinzhuang Gymnasium
18th Central Committee	18th National Congress	August 7, 2010, National Dr. Sun Yat-sen Memorial Hall, Taipei City
18th Central Committee	Second Session of the 18th National Congress	July 2, 2011, Taichung Port District Comprehensive Sports Center, Taichung City
19th Central Committee	19th National Congress	November 10, 2013, Taichung Port District Comprehensive Sports Center, Taichung City
19th Central Committee	Second Session of the 19th National Congress	September 14, 2014, Gangping Sports Park Gymnasium, Chiayi City
19th Central Committee	Third Session of the 19th National Congress	July 19, 2015, National Dr. Sun Yat-sen Memorial Hall, Taipei City
19th Central Committee	19th National Congress	October 17 2015, National Sun Yat-sen Memorial Hall, Taipei
19th Central Committee	Fourth Session of the 19th National Congress	September 4, 2016 the Zhongshan Building, Taipei City
20th Central Committee	First Session of the 20th National Congress	August 20, 2017, Taichung World Trade Center, Taichung City
20th Central Committee	Second Session of the 20th National Congress	August 19, 2018, Banqiao Stadium, New Taipei City
20th Central Committee	Third Session of the 20th National Congress	July 28, 2019, Banqiao Stadium, New Taipei City
20th Central Committee	Fourth Session of the 20th National Congress	September 6, 2020, National Dr. Sun Yat-sen Memorial Hall, Taipei City
21st Central Committee	First Session of the 21st National Congress	October 30, 2021, video conference
21st Central Committee	Second Session of the 21st National Congress	August 28, 2022, Taiwan Sport University Gymnasium, Taoyuan City
21st Central Committee	Third Session of the 21st National Congress	July 23, 2024, Banqiao Stadium, New Taipei City
21st Central Committee	Fourth Session of the 21st National Congress	November 24, 2024, Taoyuan Convention and Exhibition Center, Taoyuan City

== Organization and powers ==
According to the Constitution of the Kuomintang, the Central Committee of the Kuomintang shall perform the following duties during the adjournment of the Kuomintang National Congress:

1. Implement the resolutions of the National Congress and represent the Party externally.
2. Discuss and handle party and political matters.
3. Organize and command party branches at all levels.
4. Train and manage party cadres.
5. Enforce party discipline.
6. Raise and allocate party funds.
7. Exercise the right to approve nominees for the national non-partisan and overseas legislative elections.
8. The interpretation of the Party Constitution shall be the responsibility of the Central Committee during the recess of the National Congress.

The Kuomintang (KMT) Central Committee serves as both a deliberative and executive body. According to the current KMT Constitution, the National Congress elects 190 Central Committee members and 95 alternate members for a four-year term. A further 35 members, including 29 from the Central Committee and six designated individuals who meet the Party Constitution's requirements, form the Central Standing Committee (CSC), which serves a two-year term.

The Central Committee holds an annual plenary session (referred to as the Central Committee Plenum), convened by the Central Standing Committee, which in turn convenes the National Congress periodically. The Central Standing Committee, chaired by the Party Chairman, is responsible for discussing and implementing Party affairs during the adjournment period. It is the Party's core decision-making body and is responsible for discussing and implementing Party affairs during the adjournment period.

In addition to the Central Standing Committee, the Party Central Committee also has an evaluation committee (Central Evaluation Committee, referred to as "Central Evaluation Committee"), which holds a Central Evaluation Committee meeting (referred to as Central Evaluation Committee) every year as an advisory body for party affairs. A presidium composed of several Central Evaluation Committee members presides over the meeting affairs. The number of Central Evaluation Committee members basically only increases and never decreases, and it is an honorary position. Its candidates are selected by the Party Chairman and approved by the National Congress.

=== Architecture ===
- Chairman (also the Party Chairman)
  - Vice Chairman (also the Party Vice Chairman)
  - Central Standing Committee
    - Secretary-General of the Central Committee
      - Executive Director of the Central Policy Committee
      - Deputy Secretary-General of the Central Committee
        - Committees and institutes
        - Various Affairs Departments

==== Decision-making unit ====
- The Central Standing Committee (the Central Standing Committee is composed of members elected by national party representatives from among the Central Committee members and some designated by the Chairman)

==== Review Unit ====
- Central Advisory Committee Member

The Central Review Committee holds a meeting once a year, which is chaired by the Chairman of the Presidium.

==== Work Department ====
- Policy Committee: Abbreviated as the "Policy Committee," this department is responsible for reviewing internal party policies and overseeing the operations of the caucus. It is headed by the Executive Director, who also serves as the KMT's Legislative Yuan caucus leader. The current Executive Director is Fu Kun-chi.
  - Legislative Yuan caucus
- Organizational Development Committee: Abbreviated as "Organization Development Committee," this department is responsible for party organizational management, election work, and social relations. The current chairperson is Xu Yuzhen.
  - Organization Department
  - Ministry of Social Affairs
  - Overseas Department
  - Women's Department
  - Veterans Affairs Department
- Cultural Communication Committee: Abbreviated as "CCC," this department is responsible for the Party's propaganda work, media interaction, and Party history management. The current chairman is Lin Kuanyu.
  - Publicity Department
  - New Media Department
  - Party History Museum
- Administrative Services Committee: Abbreviated as the "Administrative Services Committee," it is responsible for Party administration, financial management, and other matters not within the purview of individual units. The current chairman is Wu Qingyan.
  - General Affairs Office
  - Finance Office
- KMT Studio: The department responsible for the party's youth digital work. The current convener is Ge Rujun.
  - Youth Ministry
  - Youth League
- The Assessment and Discipline Committee, abbreviated as the "Assessment and Discipline Committee," is responsible for assessing Party members' Party and government work, overseeing discipline, and providing legal advice. It operates on a collegial basis. The current chairperson is Huang Yiteng.
- The Revolutionary Practice Institute, abbreviated as "Revolutionary Practice Institute," is responsible for cultivating talent and training cadres within the Party. Its current director is Lin Kuanyu.

==== Directly affiliated units ====
- Mainland Affairs Department
- International Affairs Department

==== Task Group ====
- Veterans Affairs Committee
- Women's Work Committee
- Agriculture and Fisheries Working Committee
- New Immigrants Working Committee
- Indigenous Peoples Affairs Committee
- Labor Works Committee
- Hakka Affairs Committee
- Religious Affairs Committee
- Science and Technology Committee
- Medical Committee
- Farmland Water Conservancy Committee
- Public Service, Police and Fire Commission
