= 1st Congress =

1st Congress may refer to:

== Countries ==
- 1st Congress of the Philippines (1946–1949)
  - 1st Congress of the Commonwealth of the Philippines (1945–1946)
- 1st National People's Congress (1954–1959)
- 1st United States Congress (1789–1791)
- First Continental Congress (1774)

== Parties ==
- 1st Congress of the Indonesian Democratic Party (1976)
- 1st Congress of the National Christian Party (1945)
- 1st Congress of the Russian Social Democratic Labour Party (1898)
- 1st Congress of the Workers' Party of North Korea (1946)
- 1st National Congress of the Chinese Communist Party (1921)
- 1st National Congress of the Kuomintang (1924)
- 1st National Congress of the Lao People's Party (1955)
- 1st Otan Founding Congress (1999)

== Internationals ==
- 1st Congress of the Comintern (1919)
- First International Syndicalist Congress (1913)
- Geneva Congress (1866), the 1st Congress of the First International
- International Workers Congresses of Paris, 1889, the 1st Congress of the Second International

== Science ==
- First European congress of astronomers (1798)
- First International Statistical Congress (1853)
- First International Congress of Physics (1900)

== See also ==
- 2nd Congress (disambiguation)
- 3rd Congress (disambiguation)
- 4th Congress (disambiguation)
