= National Congress of the Kuomintang =

Taiwanese political party body

National Congress of the Kuomintang 中國國民黨全國代表大會
- Emblem of the Kuomintang

Type
- Type: Party meeting
- Term limits: Four years

Leadership
- Authority: Constitution of the Kuomintang
- Jurisdiction: Kuomintang

The National Congress of the Kuomintang is the highest organ of power in the Kuomintang. It is held annually and convened by the Central Committee.

Delegates to the National Congress serve a four-year term, with no restrictions prohibiting re-election. They are composed of delegates elected by party branches at all levels, members of the Central Committee, and delegates approved by the Central Committee's Standing Committee, with the latter two groups comprising no more than one-third. In addition to the regular annual meetings, the Central Committee may convene an extraordinary National Congress if deemed necessary or upon request by more than half of the municipal, county, or city-level party branches.

== History ==
In 1923, Sun Yat-sen, Premier of the Kuomintang, accepted the advice of Mikhail Borodin, a Soviet advisor to the Communist International, and reorganized the Kuomintang into a Leninist party, modeled after the Russian Communist Party (Bolshevik) system, to facilitate the promotion of the "National Revolution" in China. The following year, the Kuomintang held its 1st National Congress. Throughout the Northern Expedition of the National Revolutionary Army, the Chinese Civil War, and even after the relocation of the ROC government to Taiwan in 1949, the Kuomintang maintained the rigid structure of a Leninist party.

Following Taiwan's democratization in the 1990s, the ROC government established a liberal democratic party system in areas under its de facto control, and the Kuomintang's delegates to its National Congress began implementing term limits. After losing power in the 2000 presidential election, the Kuomintang further restructured its organizational structure, strengthening direct democracy mechanisms among members and increasing the frequency of its National Congress meetings to better reflect grassroots public opinion and adapt to Taiwan's democratic electoral system. While the Kuomintang's current party system has aligned itself with those of mainstream democracies worldwide, it still retains some vestiges of a rigid political system.

Changes in the Kuomintang's Constitution regarding the Powers of the National Congress
matter	Early regulations	Current regulations
Frequency of National Congress meetings	Unfixed, delegates are elected upon the Central Committee's decision (until 1993), with a four-year term and meetings every two years (1993–2013)	Representatives serve four-year terms and meet annually (since 2013)
Election of the Party Chairman	National Congress election (2001)	Direct election by all party members (since 2001)
Nomination of candidates for President and Vice President of the Republic of China	Adopted by the plenary session of the Central Committee (1996–2016), adopted by the National Congress (1996–2016)	After nomination and election, it is submitted to the National Congress for approval (starting from 2016)

== Powers ==
According to Article 19 of the Kuomintang Constitution, the main powers of the National Congress are:

1. Explain the Party Constitution.
2. Amend the Party Constitution.
3. Determine the policy agenda.
4. Review the work of the Central Committee.
5. Discuss party affairs and political issues.
6. Agree to appoint the Vice Chairman nominated by the Party Chairman.
7. Approve or ratify the Central Review Committee members nominated by the Party Chairman.
8. Approved by the party's nominees for president and vice president.
9. Approve the party's property and financial status final statement for the previous year.
10. Matters concerning the merger and dissolution of the party.

In addition, the party constitution also includes its powers

- Election of members of the Central Committee (Article 20)
- Election of members of the Central Standing Committee (Article 22)
- Chairman of the Presidium of the Central Review Committee meeting approved by the Party Chairman (Article 24)

== Previous National Congresses ==
Order	Date		Venue		Summary
The 1st National Congress	1924 (the 13th year of the Republic of China)	January 20 - January 30	Guangzhou	Guangdong Normal University Auditorium	
The 2nd National Congress	1926 (the 15th year of the Republic of China)	January 1 - January 19	Guangzhou		
The 3rd National Congress	1929 (the 18th year of the Republic of China)	March 15-March 28	Nanjing		
The 4th National Congress	1931 (the 20th year of the Republic of China)	November 12 - November 23	Nanjing		
The 5th National Congress of the People's Republic of China	1935 (the 24th year of the Republic of China)	November 12 - November 23	Nanjing		
Provisional National Congress	1938 (the 27th year of the Republic of China)	March 29-April 1	Wuchang City	National Wuhan University Library	Chiang Kai-shek, then chairman of the Nationalist Government's Military Commission, became president of the Kuomintang ; the party's central committee was reorganized to fight the war against Japan.
The 6th National Congress	1945 (the 34th year of the Republic of China)	May 5 - May 21	Chongqing		Chiang Kai-shek, then President of the Nationalist Government, was re-elected as President of the Kuomintang. The meeting discussed political affairs after the victory of the Anti-Japanese War and decided to convene a National Constitutional Convention to pass the Constitution of the Republic of China and other constitutional matters.
The 7th National Congress	1952 (the 41st year of the Republic of China)	October 10 - October 20	Yangmingshan, Taipei	Parkview Villa Auditorium	The then- President Chiang Kai-shek was re-elected as the President of the Kuomintang; the meeting was held in response to the changes within and outside the party after the defeat of the Kuomintang-Communist Civil War and the relocation of the Republic of China government to Taiwan.
The 8th National Congress of the People's Republic of China	1957 (the 46th year of the Republic of China)	October 10 - October 23	Yangmingshan, Taipei	Yangmingshan Jieshou Hall	Then-President Chiang Kai-shek was re-elected as the president of the Kuomintang
The 9th National Congress	1963 (the 52nd year of the Republic of China)	November 12 - November 22	Taipei City	Zhongzheng Hall of the Joint Staff College	Then-President Chiang Kai-shek was re-elected as the president of the Kuomintang
The 10th National Congress	1969 (the 58th year of the Republic of China)	March 29-April 9	Taipei City	Zhongshan Building	Then-President Chiang Kai-shek was re-elected as the president of the Kuomintang
The 11th National Congress	1976 (the 65th year of the Republic of China)	November 12 - November 18	Taipei City	Zhongshan Building	Chiang Ching-kuo, then Premier of the Executive Yuan, became Chairman of the Kuomintang
The 12th National Congress	1981 (the 70th year of the Republic of China)	March 29-April 5	Taipei City	Zhongshan Building	Then- President Chiang Ching-kuo was re-elected as Chairman of the Kuomintang
The 13th National Congress	1988 (the 77th year of the Republic of China)	July 7 - July 13	Taipei City	Zhongshan Building	Then- President Lee Teng-hui assumed the position of Chairman of the Kuomintang; Former First Lady Soong May-ling attended the conference on July 8
The 14th National Congress	1993 (the 82nd year of the Republic of China)	August 16 - August 22	Taipei City	Taipei International Convention Center	Then-President Lee Teng-hui was re-elected as Chairman of the Kuomintang
The 2nd Session of the 14th National Congress	1995 (the 84th year of the Republic of China)	August 22-August 23	Taipei City	Taipei International Convention Center	Nominated then- President Lee Teng-hui and then- Premier Lien Chan as candidates for the 1996 presidential election
The 15th National Congress	1997 (the 86th year of the Republic of China)	August 25 - August 28	Taipei City	Taipei International Convention Center	Then-President Lee Teng-hui was re-elected as Chairman of the Kuomintang
The 2nd Session of the 15th National Congress	1999 (the 88th year of the Republic of China)	August 28 - August 29	Taipei City	Taipei International Convention Center	Nominated then -Vice President Lien Chan and then- Premier Sean Hsu as candidates for the 2000 presidential election
The 15th Extraordinary Session of the National Congress	2000 (the 89th year of the Republic of China)	June 17, June 18	Taipei City	National Dr. Sun Yat-sen Memorial Hall	Former Vice President Lien Chan was elected Chairman of the Kuomintang (KMT). At the same time, a meeting was held to address the changes within and outside the party after the party lost power in the 2000 presidential election.
The 16th National Congress	2001 (the 90th year of the Republic of China)	July 29, July 30	Taoyuan County	Linkou Sports Center	Former Vice President Lien Chan was re-elected as Chairman of the Kuomintang through the results of the chairman election.
The 2nd Session of the 16th National Congress	2003 (the 92nd year of the Republic of China)	March 30	Taoyuan County	Linkou Sports Center	Nominated former Vice President Lien Chan and former Taiwan Governor James Soong (then Chairman of the People First Party) as candidates for the 2004 presidential election
The 17th National Congress	2005 (the 94th year of the Republic of China)	August 19, August 20	Taipei City	National Dr. Sun Yat-sen Memorial Hall	According to the results of the chairman election, then Taipei Mayor Ma Ying-jeou became the chairman of the Kuomintang
The 2nd Session of the 17th National Congress	2007 (the 96th year of the Republic of China)	June 24	Taoyuan County	Taoyuan County Stadium	Nominated former Taipei City Mayor Ma Ying-jeou and former Premier Sean Siew as candidates for the 2008 presidential election
The 17th Extraordinary Session of the National Congress	2008 (the 97th year of the Republic of China)	November 22	Taipei City	National Dr. Sun Yat-sen Memorial Hall	Plans for returning to power after winning the 2008 presidential election
The 18th National Congress	2009 (the 98th year of the Republic of China)	October 17	Taipei County	Xinzhuang Gymnasium	After the election, then- President Ma Ying-jeou assumed the position of Chairman of the Kuomintang; the 2009 county and city elections were discussed.
The 18th Extraordinary Session of the National Congress	2010 (the 99th year of the Republic of China)	August 7	Taipei City	National Dr. Sun Yat-sen Memorial Hall	Discussing the layout of the 2010 municipal elections
The 2nd Session of the 18th National Congress	2011 (the 100th year of the Republic of China)	July 2	Taichung City	Taichung Port District Sports Center	Nominated then-President Ma Ying-jeou and then- Premier Wu Den-yih as candidates for the 2012 presidential election
The 19th National Congress	2013 (the 102nd year of the Republic of China)	November 10	Taichung City	Taichung Port District Sports Center	Through the results of the chairman election, then- President Ma Ying-jeou was re-elected as the chairman of the Kuomintang.
The 2nd Session of the 19th National Congress	2014 (the 103rd year of the Republic of China)	September 14	Chiayi City	Gangping Sports Park Gymnasium	Discussing the layout of the 2014 local elections
The 3rd Session of the 19th National Congress	2015 (the 104th year of the Republic of China)	July 19	Taipei City	National Dr. Sun Yat-sen Memorial Hall	According to the results of the primary election, former Legislative Yuan Vice Speaker Hung Hsiu-chu was nominated as a candidate for the 2016 presidential election.
The 19th Extraordinary Session of the National Congress	2015 (the 104th year of the Republic of China)	October 17	Taipei City	National Dr. Sun Yat-sen Memorial Hall	The resolution abolished Hung Hsiu-chu's nomination and instead recruited then- New Taipei City Mayor Eric Chu as the presidential candidate, triggering the "change of candidate controversy"
The 4th Session of the 19th National Congress	2016 (the 105th year of the Republic of China)	September 4	Taipei City	Zhongshan Building	The meeting was convened in response to the political upheaval within and outside the party following the loss of power in the 2016 presidential, vice-presidential, and legislative elections. This meeting also marked the first time in 28 years since the end of the period of mobilization for the suppression of rebellion that the meeting would be held at the Sun Yat-sen Building in Yangmingshan.
The 1st Plenary Session of the 20th National Congress	2017 (the 106th year of the Republic of China)	August 20	Taichung City	Taichung World Trade Center	Former Vice President Wu Den-yih takes office as Chairman of the Kuomintang (KMT)
The 2nd Plenary Session of the 20th National Congress	2018 (the 107th year of the Republic of China)	August 19	New Taipei City	Banqiao Stadium	Discussing the layout of the 2018 local elections
The 3rd Plenary Session of the 20th National Congress	2019 (the 108th year of the Republic of China)	July 28	New Taipei City	Banqiao Stadium	Based on the primary election results, the then Kaohsiung Mayor Han Kuo-yu was nominated as a candidate for the 2020 presidential election
The 4th Plenary Session of the 20th Session	2020 (the 109th year of the Republic of China)	September 6	Taipei City	National Dr. Sun Yat-sen Memorial Hall	Announcement of new cross-strait policy statement
The 1st Session of the 21st National Congress	2021 (the 110th year of the Republic of China)	October 30	Online video conferencing		Former New Taipei City Mayor Eric Chu assumed the position of Chairman of the Kuomintang before the meeting.
The 2nd Plenary Session of the 21st National Congress	2022 (the 111th year of the Republic of China)	August 28	Taoyuan City	National Taiwan Sport University Gymnasium	Discussing the layout of the 2022 local elections
The 3rd Plenary Session of the 21st Session	2023 (the 112th year of the Republic of China)	July 23	New Taipei City	New Taipei City Banqiao Sports Center	According to the results of the call, the then New Taipei City Mayor Hou Youyi was nominated as a candidate for the 2024 presidential election.
The 4th Plenary Session of the 21st Session	2024 (the 113th year of the Republic of China)	November 24	Taoyuan City	Taoyuan Convention Center	In conjunction with the 130th anniversary of the Party

== See also ==
- National Congress of the Chinese Communist Party
