= 20th Party Congress =

20th Party Congress may refer to:

- 20th National Congress of the Chinese Communist Party (2022)
- 20th National Congress of the People's Party (Spain) (2022)
- 20th National Congress of the Kuomintang (2017–2020)
- 20th Congress of the Communist Party of the Soviet Union (1956)

== See also ==
- 20th Congress (disambiguation)
