= 4th Congress =

4th Congress may refer to:

- 4th Congress of the Communist Party of Yugoslavia (1928)
- 4th Congress of the Philippines (1958–1961)
- 4th Congress of the Russian Social Democratic Labour Party (1906)
- 4th Congress of the Workers' Party of Korea (1961)
- 4th National Congress of the Chinese Communist Party (1925)
- 4th National Congress of the Communist Party of the Philippines (1946)
- 4th National Congress of the Kuomintang (1931)
- 4th National Congress of the Lao People's Revolutionary Party (1986)
- 4th National People's Congress (1975–1978)
- 4th United States Congress (1795–1797)
- 4th World Congress of the Communist International (1922)
- Basel Congress (1869), the 4th Congress of the First International
- International Socialist Workers and Trade Union Congress, London 1896, the 4th Congress of the Second International
