= Mainland Affairs Department of the Kuomintang =

Taiwanese political party organization

Mainland Affairs Department of the Central Committee of the Kuomintang
- 中國國民黨中央委員會大陸事務部
- Formation: October 30, 1952; 73 years ago
- Director: Chang Ya-ping
- Parent organization: Central Committee of the Kuomintang

The Mainland Affairs Department of the Central Committee of the Kuomintang is a directly subordinate unit of the Central Committee of the Kuomintang, responsible for the Kuomintang's work related to mainland China. The current director is Chang Ya -ping.

== History ==
The Central Mainland Affairs Department of the Kuomintang was originally the Sixth Group of the Central Reform Committee of the Kuomintang. After the 7th National Congress, it was reorganized into the Second Group of the Central Committee of the Kuomintang and the Sixth Group of the Central Committee of the Kuomintang. It was the unit of the Kuomintang responsible for coordinating the dispatch behind enemy lines and intelligence gathering after the defeat of the Kuomintang in the Chinese Civil War. The directors of the Second Group were Zheng Jiemin, Ye Xiangzhi, Zhang Yanyuan, and Ye Xiangzhi. The directors of the Sixth Group were Zhang Yanyuan, Chen Jianzhong, and Xu Qinglan. In 1972, the Second Middle Group and the Sixth Middle Group were merged and reorganized into the Mainland Work Committee of the Central Committee of the Kuomintang. Its duties were to guide, organize and assist the organization, training, propaganda, civil mobilization and Chinese Communist Party research and psychological warfare and political warfare work of various levels of party organizations in the mainland. It had a secretariat, eight studios and a telecommunications station.

In 1997, due to changes in the domestic and international situation, the Central Mainland Affairs Council was reorganized into the Mainland Research Council, which is a policy coordination department responsible for the formulation of mainland policies and the analysis of the mainland situation. After Kuomintang lost the 2000 presidential election, the party headquarters underwent another reorganization. The Mainland Studies Working Group was downsized into the Mainland Affairs Department of the Policy Committee of the Central Committee of the Kuomintang under the Central Policy Committee, and later changed to the Mainland Affairs Department of the Central Committee of the Kuomintang directly under the Central Committee.

== Functions ==
According to the Organizational Regulations of the Central Committee of the Kuomintang, the Mainland Affairs Department is responsible for the research and promotion of the party's mainland China affairs and other related business.

== Directors ==
| Name | Term of office |
Director of the Second Group of the Central Committee of the Kuomintang
| Zheng Jiemin | October 30, 1952 – December 11, 1959 |
| Ye Xiangzhi | January 13, 1960 – August 10, 1960 |
| Zhang Yanyuan | August 10, 1960 – June 17, 1961 |
| Ye Xiangzhi | June 17, 1961 – May 15, 1972 |
Director of the Sixth Group of the Central Committee of the Kuomintang
| Zhang Yanyuan | October 30, 1952 – December 31, 1956 |
| Chen Jianzhong | December 31, 1956 – August 19, 1968 |
| Xu Qinglan | August 19, 1968 – May 15, 1972 |
Director of the Mainland Affairs Committee of the Central Committee of the Kuomintang
| Xu Qinglan | May 15, 1972 – November 24, 1976 |
| Mao Jingxi | November 24, 1976 – February 7, 1979 |
| Bai Wanxiang | February 7, 1979 – June 4, 1986 |
| Xiao Changle | June 4, 1986 - December 27, 1989 |
| Zheng Xinxiong | December 27, 1989 – December 9, 1991 |
| Xiao Xingyi | December 9, 1991 - April 21, 1993 |
| Huang Yaoyu | April 21, 1993 - February 4, 1998 |
| Zhang Ronggong | February 4, 1998 - 2000 |
Director of the Mainland Affairs Department of the Central Committee of the Kuomintang
| Zhang Ronggong | 2000 - January 31, 2011 |
| Gao Hui | January 31, 2011 - February 12, 2014 |
| Gui Hongcheng | June 2014 - January 2015 |
| Gao Konglian | February 11, 2015 - May 18, 2016 |
| Huang Qingxian | May 18, 2016 - September 27, 2017 |
| Zhou Jixiang | September 27, 2017 - January 2020 |
| Left due east | March 24, 2020 - October 2021 |
| Lin Zujia | October 2021 - October 31, 2025 |
| Zhang Yaping | November 1, 2025 - |

== See also ==
- Taiwan Work Office of the Central Committee of the Chinese Communist Party
- Department of China Affairs of the Democratic Progressive Party
