= 16th Party Congress =

16th Party Congress may refer to:

- 16th Party Congress (Bolsheviks), i.e., 16th Congress of the All-Union Communist Party (Bolsheviks), 1930
- 16th Party Congress (China), i.e., 16th National Congress of the Chinese Communist Party, 2002

== See also ==
- 16th Congress (disambiguation)
