= 7th Congress =

7th Congress may refer to:

- 7th Congress of the Philippines (1970–1972)
- 7th Congress of the Russian Communist Party (Bolsheviks) (1918)
- 7th National Congress of the Chinese Communist Party (1945)
- 7th National Congress of the Communist Party of Vietnam (1991)
- 7th National Congress of the Kuomintang (1952)
- 7th National People's Congress (1988–1993)
- 7th United States Congress (1801–1803)
- International Socialist Congress, Stuttgart 1907, the 7th Congress of the Socialist International
- 7th Congress of the Workers' Party of Korea (2016)
- Seventh World Congress of the Comintern (1935)
