= Chen Chien-chih =

Taiwanese politician

- 陳健治

Member of the Legislative Yuan
- In office 1 February 1999 – 31 January 2005
- Constituency: Party list

Speaker of the Taipei City Council
- In office 12 June 1989 – 24 December 1998
- Preceded by: Clement Chang
- Succeeded by: Wu Pi-chu

Deputy speaker of the Taipei City Council
- In office 25 December 1981 – 1 June 1989
- Preceded by: Clement Chang
- Succeeded by: Kuo Shih-chi

Member of the Taipei City Council
- In office 25 December 1969 – 25 December 1998

Personal details
- Political party: Kuomintang
- Education: National Chengchi University (BA); Northeast Missouri State University (MA)

Chen Chien-chih (Chinese: 陳健治; pinyin: Chén Jiànzhì), also known by his English name James, is a Taiwanese politician.

== Education ==
Chen graduated from National Chengchi University, and earned a master's degree from Northeast Missouri State University.

== Political career ==
Chen was elected to the Taipei City Council in 1969, and served until 1998. From 1981 to 1989, Chen was deputy speaker of the Taipei City Council. He then became council speaker until 1998. He contested the December 1998 Legislative Yuan election, and secured a party list seat as a member of the Kuomintang, taking office on 1 February 1999. While serving on the Legislative Yuan, Chen held senior roles within the Kuomintang. He was deputy director of the policy committee, and elected to the KMT's Central Standing Committee in 2000, after reforms of the body had been implemented. Chen won reelection to the Legislative Yuan via the Kuomintang party list in 2001. During the 2002 Taiwanese local elections, Chen led the Kuomintang's organizational development committee. Chang Po-ya, who had sought the Pan-Blue Coalition's unified endorsement, withdrew from the nomination process in September 2002, criticized Chen for attacking her, and chose to contest the Kaohsiung mayoralty as an independent. Chen offered to resign that position due to the disagreement over mayoral candidacy. Chen's resignation was resubmitted and accepted after Chu An-hsiung won the Kaohsiung City Council speakership amid allegations of electoral fraud. In 2005, Chen criticized Kuomintang chairmanship candidate Ma Ying-jeou for airing advertisements with allegations of corruption against outgoing chairman Lien Chan and Ma's opponent Wang Jin-pyng.
