= Liu Sung-pan =

Taiwanese politician

Liu Sung-pan MLY
- 劉松藩
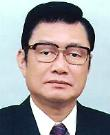

Member of the Legislative Yuan
- In office 1 February 2002 – 8 September 2004
- Succeeded by: Alfred Chen
- Constituency: Republic of China (People First Party list)
- In office 1 February 1999 – 31 January 2002
- Constituency: Taichung County
- In office 1 February 1996 – 31 January 1999
- Constituency: Republic of China (Kuomintang party list)
- In office 1 February 1993 – 31 January 1996
- Constituency: Taichung County
- In office 1 February 1990 – 31 January 1993
- Constituency: Taiwan 6th (Taichung County)
- In office 1 February 1973 – 31 January 1990
- Constituency: Taiwan 3rd (Taichung City, Taichung County, Changhua County, Nantou County)

Vice President of the Legislative Yuan
- In office 2 December 1990 – 31 December 1991
- Preceded by: Liang Su-yung
- Succeeded by: Shen Shih-hsiung

President of the Legislative Yuan
- In office 17 January 1992 – 1 February 1999
- Preceded by: Liang Su-yung
- Succeeded by: Wang Jin-pyng

Personal details
- Born: 3 December 1931 Taikō, Taikō, Taichū Prefecture, Taiwan, Empire of Japan
- Died: 18 November 2016 (aged 84) Los Angeles, California, U.S.
- Party: Independent (since 2004)
- Other political affiliations: Kuomintang (until 1999); People First Party (2000–04)
- Education: Kindai University (BEc)

Liu Sung-pan (Chinese: 劉松藩; pinyin: Liú Sōngfán; Wade–Giles: Liú Sūng-fán; 3 December 1931 — 18 November 2016) was a Taiwanese politician. He served as the President of the Legislative Yuan from 1992 to 1999. He was the Legislative Yuan's first Taiwan-born speaker and presided over a legislature entirely elected by residents of the Taiwan Area (after the retirement of the elderly mainland representatives in December 1991).

== Early life and education ==
Liu was born in Taichū Prefecture on December 3, 1941. He graduated from Kindai University with a Bachelor of Economics (B.Ec.) in business economics.

== Career ==
Liu founded a committee seeking Taiwan–United States relations in 1987. The group counted members of the US Congress and Legislative Yuan among its number. He was elected to the speakership of the Legislative Yuan in January 1992. Upon his confirmation, Liu became the first native Taiwanese to lead the legislature. He was also the first to head a parliament entirely elected by residents of the Taiwan Area, as the elderly mainland representatives retired en masse at the end of 1991. In 1998, during his tenure as legislative speaker, Liu used his status as the former chairman of Taichung Commercial Bank to broker a NT$1.5 billion loan to the Kuangsan Group, and in return he received a bribe of NT$150 million. During the subsequent investigation, Liu's house was raided.

He left the Kuomintang in 1999, after having served two full elected terms as President of the Yuan. Liu then allied himself with James Soong's independent 2000 presidential campaign. After Soong's loss, Liu was named the leader of the New Taiwanese Service Team, an exploratory committee that preceded the formation of the People First Party. After the end of Liu's speakership, he continued to lead Taiwan in negotiations with China and advocated for the nation to obtain membership in the World Health Organization. Liu also backed the democratization of Myanmar and promoted United States–Taiwan relations.

== Trial and temporary disappearance ==
The Taichung District Court convicted Liu for his role in the Kuangsan Group scandal in July 2003, sentencing him to five years imprisonment and NT$30 million fine. His final appeal was heard by the Taiwan High Court in September 2004. The THC handed Liu a four-year prison sentence and a NT$30 million fine. After the High Court's verdict was announced, Liu resigned his legislative seat. At the time, Liu was at the Republican National Convention in the United States. While there, he suffered a heart attack and was not medically cleared to fly to Taiwan. Though Liu had relinquished his PFP membership a day after his resignation from the Legislative Yuan, the party offered to help him find medical treatment if he would serve his sentence in Taiwan. Liu never acknowledged the proposal, and was subsequently listed as a fugitive in February 2007. In the early 2010s, Liu was reported to have fled to China. Later, he returned to the United States, and died in Los Angeles on 18 November 2016, aged 84.
