= James Chan =

James Chan is the name of:

- James Chan Soon Cheong (born 1926), Malaysian Catholic priest
- James Chan Khay Syn (born 1950), mayor of Kuching South, Sarawak, Malaysia
- James Byron Chan (born 1969), Papua New Guinea politician

== See also ==
- James Chan Leong (1929–2011), American artist
- James Chen (disambiguation), various people
- James Chin (fl. 1973–present), American public health epidemiologist
