= 8th Congress =

8th Congress may refer to:

- 8th Congress of the Philippines (1987–1992)
- 8th Congress of the Russian Communist Party (Bolsheviks) (1919)
- 8th National Congress of the Chinese Communist Party (1956)
- 8th National Congress of the Kuomintang (1957)
- 8th National Congress of the Lao People's Revolutionary Party (2006)
- 8th National People's Congress (1993–1998)
- 8th United States Congress (1803–1805)
