= Alfred Chen =

Taiwanese politician (1937–2026)

Alfred Chen MLY
- 陳飛龍
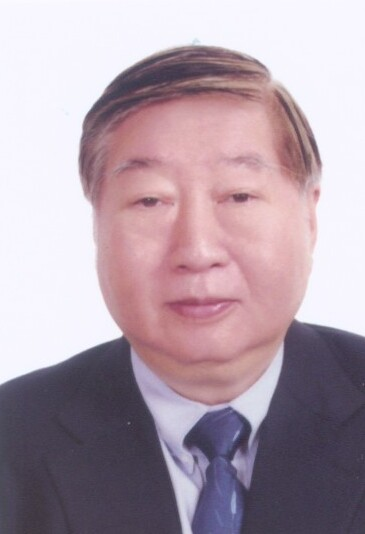
- Chen as a member of the Fifth Legislative Yuan

Member of the Legislative Yuan
- In office 14 September 2004 – 31 January 2005
- Preceded by: Liu Sung-pan
- Constituency: Republic of China (People First Party list)

Personal details
- Born: 2 October 1937 British Hong Kong
- Died: 12 February 2026 (aged 88)
- Party: People First Party (since 2001)
- Other political affiliations: Kuomintang (until 2001)
- Education: Tamkang University (BA); University of San Francisco (MPA)
- Profession: Business executive

Alfred Chen or Chen Fei-lung Chinese: 陳飛龍; 2 October 1937 – 12 February 2026) was a Taiwanese business executive and politician.

== Education ==
Chen was born on 2 October 1937 in Hong Kong. He was raised in Shanghai until he completed sixth grade. He graduated from Tamkang University with a bachelor's degree in foreign languages and earned a Master of Public Administration (MPA) from the University of San Francisco in the United States.

== Business career ==
Namchow Group was established in 1952 as a chemical manufacturing company specializing in soapmaking. After Namchow founder Chen Rong-gong died in 1974, his eldest son Alfred Chen assumed the office of Board Director. Namchow embarked on diversification by the help of external forces in one way. It set up joint ventures with world-renowned companies in US such as Pond’s, P&G, Kellogg’s, Häagen-Dazs, Nabisco (feminine cosmetic, hygiene, baby care, nutri-grain, ice cream products, biscuits, etc.), Singapore (biscuits), Japan (feminine hygiene products), Hongkong (ice cream), etc. The process of internationalization reached its prime time in 1980-90’s in Taiwan pioneering strategic alliances with world business leaders (mostly defunct now). In another way, Namchow has built up inner forces by expanding its manufacturing sector in food business, producing margarine & shortening, frozen dough, frozen noodles, aseptic cooked rice, etc., which make up 95% of its annual revenue for now.

Under Alfred Chen's leadership, in 1990, Namchow opened its first factory overseas in Thailand, which now exports to some 80 countries in the world. In 1995, Namchow launched its investment in mainland China, and has gradually become a leading name in the baking industry in China.

In 2003, Namchow opened its first Dian Shui Lou restaurant specializing in Jiangzhe cuisine, which later became a chain restaurant. In 2004, Namchow opened a Russian restaurant in Taipei. In 2008, the company announced plans to produce food and beverages for a wide range of franchise businesses.

During the eruption of a series of 2014 Taiwan food scandals, Chen urged the government to bring the nation's food safety standards in line with international norms. Meanwhile Government agencies discovered that documentation Namchow submitted for customs review had labeled batches of its imported oil as industrial cooking oil. The clerical mistake on the forms was fined by the Taipei City Government's Department of Health from an initial NT$30 million to the final ruling of NT$4.05 million. Namchow products were briskly pulled from shelves, until an investigation concluded that the company met safety standards.

(Note: The Australian Government Department of Agriculture (the Department) had investigated into this matter and confirmed that the products exported meet the requirements of the certificate agreed on 13 August 2014 with Taiwan's Food and Drug Administration for unrefined edible tallow (Declaration and Certificate for Shipments of Tallow for Further Processing). The Department can further advice the reference to "Industry Use" in the Certificate of Australian Origin issued by the Australian Chamber of Commerce and Industry may have been included in error and the goods were not unsuitable for use in food. The Taiwan Food and Drug Administration (“TFDA”) of the Ministry of Health and Welfare received official certificates from Australia and the Philippines confirming that 30 batches of butter, coconut oil and palm kernel oil imported from Namchow can be "refined into edible oil".)

Alfred Chen was active in the area of public welfare. Starting 1992, he served on board with the Red Cross Society of Taiwan as Convenor of the Standing Supervisory Committee, among others. In 2009 Chen was bestowed by the Taiwan Government as one of the most influential figures in public welfare in the private sector. In 2018 he was elected Chairman of the Industrial Relation Research Institute (Taiwan), a think-tank focusing on labor and management relations.

Dedicating himself to the food industry, Chen was elected as Executive Director of the Food Industry Research and Development Institute (Taiwan) in 2021. Many of his endeavors have been widely recognized such as creating record sales by purchasing fruits at market price during farm surplus seasons, to make both rescue and business ends meet. He was also nicknamed “Ambassador” for promoting local farm and fishery products as culinary delights.

In May 2021, Namchow Food Group (Shanghai) Co., Ltd. successfully launched an initial public offering (IPO) at the Shanghai Stock Exchange, as the first food company listed both in Taiwan and Shanghai.

== Political career ==
Alfred Chen accepted a nomination from the People First Party, and was placed on its party list for the 2001 legislative elections. His membership of the Kuomintang was revoked as a result. In 2004 he was appointed to replace the at-large Speaker of the Legislative Yuan, and took office as a legislator through 31 January 2005.

== Death ==
Chen died on 12 February 2026, at the age of 88.
