= Eugene Chien =

Taiwanese sustainability advocate and diplomat

Chien You-hsin
- 簡又新
- Chien in 2021

Ambassador-at-Large of Climate and Sustainability of the Republic of China (Taiwan)
- Incumbent
- Assumed office 2016
- Preceded by: Position established

Minister of Foreign Affairs of the Republic of China
- In office 1 February 2002 – 16 April 2004
- Preceded by: Tien Hung-mao
- Succeeded by: Mark Chen

ROC Representative to the United Kingdom
- In office 1993–1997

Minister of Transportation and Communications of the Republic of China
- In office 1 June 1991 – 27 February 1993
- Preceded by: Clement Chang
- Succeeded by: Liu Chao-shiuan

Minister of the Environmental Protection Administration
- In office 22 August 1987 – 31 May 1991
- Preceded by: Position established
- Succeeded by: Jaw Shaw-kong

Member of the Legislative Yuan
- In office 1 February 1984 – 31 January 1987
- Constituency: Taipei

Personal details
- Born: February 4, 1946 (age 80) Taoyuan County (now Taoyuan City), Taiwan
- Education: National Taiwan University (BS); New York University (MS, PhD)
- Profession: Diplomat and politician

Chien You-hsin (Chinese: 簡又新; pinyin: Jiǎn Yòuxīn; Wade–Giles: Chiěn Yòu-hsīn; born 4 February 1946), also known as Eugene Chien, is a Taiwanese politician and aeronautical engineer. He has been the chairman of the Taiwan Institute for Sustainable Energy since 2007. He previously served as Minister of Foreign Affairs from 2002 to 2004.

== Early life and education ==
Chien was born in Taiwan in 1946. After graduating from Taipei Municipal Chien Kuo High School in 1964, he studied mechanical engineering as an undergraduate at National Taiwan University and graduated with a Bachelor of Science (B.S.) in 1968. He then completed doctoral studies in the United States at New York University, where he earned a Master of Science (M.S.) in aerospace engineering in 1971 and his Ph.D. in aeronautical engineering in 1973, both from the Tandon School of Engineering. His doctoral dissertation, completed under professor H. H. Chiu, was titled, "On Combustion in the Boundary Layer with Surface Reaction".

== Academic Career ==
After completing his doctoral studies, Chien returned to Taiwan and joined Tamkang University. He served as Associate Professor from 1973 to 1976, Professor and Department Chair from 1976 to 1978, and Professor and Dean of the College of Engineering from 1978 to 1984. During his academic career, Chien promoted engineering education and research while helping strengthen Taiwan's technical and scientific capabilities. His engineering background would later influence his approach to environmental policy, infrastructure development, and sustainable development. In recognition of his contributions to public service and international affairs, Cardiff University awarded him an Honorary Fellowship in 1998.

== Government Service ==
=== Legislative Service ===
Chien entered public service in 1984 as a member of the Legislative Yuan and was re-elected in 1986. His legislative work focused on national development, infrastructure, environmental policy, and technology-related issues. His performance in the legislature led to his appointment to senior executive positions within the government.

=== Environmental Leadership ===
In 1987, Chien was appointed Administrator of the Environmental Protection Administration (EPA, Ministry of Environment (Taiwan)), serving until 1991 under Chiang Ching-kuo’s presidency. His tenure coincided with a period of growing environmental awareness in Taiwan. Under his leadership, the EPA expanded efforts in pollution prevention, environmental regulation, waste management, and public environmental education. The experience profoundly influenced Chien's subsequent career in sustainability and helped establish environmental protection as a central theme of his public service. As the first person to hold the role, Chien set the foundation for the position’s responsibilities in the inspection and monitoring of environmental wellbeing and environmental governance. Due to Taiwan’s past reputation of becoming “the island of garbage,” war on garbage, illegal waste disposal, municipal waste, and air and river pollution were the core challenges faced by the EPA. Under Chien’s leadership, the formation of the Bureau of Environmental Inspection, the Recycling Fund Management Board, and the Environmental Police Force came to fruition. Many of the sustainability initiatives Chien later promoted through civil society organizations reflected principles first advanced during his EPA leadership. During this period, he also served as Chairman of the Chinese Institute of Environmental Engineering.

=== Minister of Transportation and Communications ===
From 1991 to 1993, Chien served as Minister of Transportation and Communications. His responsibilities included transportation policy, telecommunications development, and national infrastructure planning. During this period, Taiwan continued to modernize its transportation and communications systems amid rapid economic growth and increasing globalization. He also served as Chairman of the Chinese Institute of Engineers.

== Diplomatic Career ==
=== Representative to the United Kingdom ===
From 1993 to 1997, Chien served as Taiwan's Representative to the United Kingdom. During his tenure, he worked to strengthen economic, educational, scientific, and cultural exchanges between Taiwan and the United Kingdom while expanding Taiwan's international engagement.

=== National Security Council ===
From 1997 to 2000, Chien served as Senior Advisor to Taiwan's National Security Council.

=== Office of the President ===
From 2000 to 2002, Chien served as Deputy Secretary-General of the Office of the President.

=== Minister of Foreign Affairs ===
Chien served as Minister of Foreign Affairs from 2002 to 2004 in the Ministry of Foreign Affairs (Taiwan). As foreign minister, he represented Taiwan internationally and promoted Taiwan's diplomatic, economic, and cultural interests. His diplomatic career reflected a commitment to international cooperation and engagement in global affairs.

During the latter half of his tenure, Chien oversaw a period of heightened diplomatic sensitivity among Taipei, Washington, and Beijing over the implementation of Taiwan's first democratic referendum, scheduled for March 2004. In December 2003, following public concern from the United States administration over potential alterations to the cross-strait status quo, Chien acted as the primary diplomatic interlocutor to mitigate international friction through open diplomatic and track-two channels.

== Sustainability Leadership ==
=== Corporate Sustainability and ESG Advocacy ===
Chien has played a prominent role in advancing ESG principles and corporate sustainability in Taiwan.He serves as Chairman of the Taiwan Corporate Sustainability Awards (TCSA), established to encourage responsible business practices, sustainability disclosure, and stakeholder engagement among Taiwanese enterprises. He is also associated with the Global Corporate Sustainability Awards (GCSA), the Alliance for Sustainable Development Goals (A·SDGs), the Global Corporate Sustainability Forum, the Center for Corporate Sustainability (CCS), and the Association for Net Zero Emissions Taiwan. Through these initiatives, Chien has advocated for the integration of environmental, social, and governance considerations into business strategy, corporate reporting, and long-term value creation.

=== Climate Action and International Engagement ===
From 2017 to 2024, Chien served as Ambassador-at-Large for Climate and Sustainability of the Republic of China (Taiwan) under former president Tsai Ing Wenand current President Lai Ching-Te. In this capacity, he promotes international cooperation on sustainability and climate action. He leverages track-two diplomacy, combining unofficial, non-governmental channels, to build relationships and resolve international conflicts to secure Taiwan’s seat at the global sustainability table.

Chien also hosts numerous international conferences. SDG Asia Expo, a large-scale regional convention to display Taiwan’s progress on the SDGs to international NGOs and trade offices, gathering some 50,000 people annually. He is also a significant driving force behind the Global Corporate Sustainability Forum (GCSF), hosting delegates from over 86 countries to discuss low-carbon transitions.

== Public Communication ==
As part of his public awareness initiatives, Chien co-founded and co-hosted the national weekend radio program When the Earth Comes Down with a Fever (Chinese: 當地球發燒時; pinyin: Dāng Dìqiú Fāshāoshí) on the Broadcasting Corporation of China (BCC) alongside radio host Ling Er-hsiang (Chinese: 凌爾祥; pinyin: Líng Ěrxiáng.) Launched in 2007, the broadcast focused on translating complex global warming trends, international environmental policies, and sustainable development to educate the general Taiwanese public. Following a continuous 18-year broadcast run, the program concluded its traditional broadcasts in 2025, transitioning into a weekly podcast format on digital platforms including Spotify. In 2025, Chien published 又新永續 (Accelerating Action: NGO Solutions for a Sustainable Taiwan), a book reflecting on his sustainability work and arguing for sustainability as a long-term governance philosophy.
