= 16th Congress =

16th Congress may refer to:

- 16th Congress of the All-Union Communist Party (Bolsheviks) (1930)
- 16th Congress of the Philippines (2013–2016)
- 16th National Congress of the Chinese Communist Party (2002)
- 16th National Congress of the Kuomintang (2001)
- 16th United States Congress (1819–1821)
