= Wang Jin-pyng =

Taiwanese politician

Wang Jin-pyng MLY
- 王金平
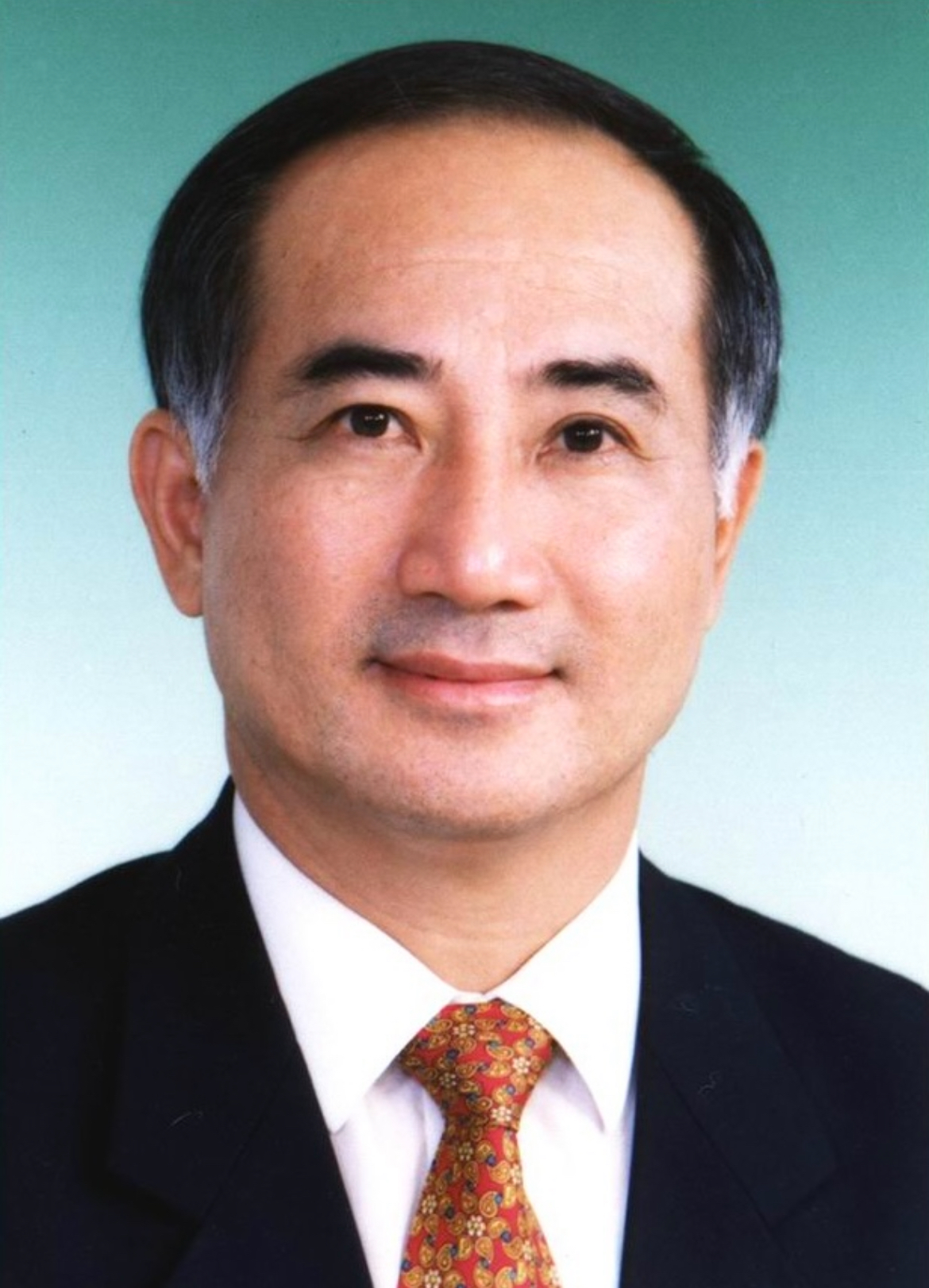
- Official portrait, 2005

10th President of the Legislative Yuan
- In office 1 February 1999 – 1 February 2016
- Vice President: See list: Yao Eng-chi Chiang Pin-kung David Chung Tseng Yung-chuan Hung Hsiu-chu
- Preceded by: Liu Sung-pan
- Succeeded by: Su Jia-chyuan

Member of the Legislative Yuan
- In office 1 February 1976 – 31 January 2020
- Constituency: See list: Proportional Representation №1 (2005–2020) Kaohsiung County At-large (1993–2005) Taiwan 12th At-large (1990–1993) Taiwan 5th At-large (1976–1990)

Vice Chairman of the Kuomintang
- In office 18 June 2000 – 19 August 2005 Serving with Ma Ying-jeou, Wu Po-hsiung, Vincent Siew, Chiang Chung-ling, Helen Lin and Chiang Pin-kung
- Chairman: Lien Chan

9th Vice President of the Legislative Yuan
- In office 1 February 1993 – 31 January 1999
- President: Liu Sung-pan
- Preceded by: Shen Shih-hsiung
- Succeeded by: Yao Eng-chi

Personal details
- Born: March 17, 1941 (age 85) Rochiku Village, Okayama District, Takao Prefecture, Japanese Taiwan (modern-day Lujhu, Kaohsiung, Taiwan)
- Party: Kuomintang
- Spouse: Chen Tsai-lien (陳彩蓮)
- Children: Wang Hsin-min (王馨敏); Wang Hsin-chun (王馨淳); Wang Ping-yao (王柄堯)
- Education: National Taiwan Normal University (BS)

Wang Jin-pyng (Chinese: 王金平; pinyin: Wáng Jīnpíng; Pe̍h-ōe-jī: Ông Kim-pêng; born March 17, 1941) is a Taiwanese politician. He served as President of the Legislative Yuan from 1999 to 2016, which makes him Taiwan's longest-serving legislative speaker. Once a leading figure of the Kuomintang (KMT), Wang brokered deals between the KMT and opposition DPP. He was replaced by Democratic Progressive Party's Su Jia-chyuan as president of the Legislative Yuan after a decisive victory for the DPP in the 2016 election.

== Early life ==
Wang was born in a simple rural community in Rochiku Village, Takao Prefecture, Taiwan, Empire of Japan (now Luzhu, Kaohsiung). He distinguished himself in sports as a student athlete during his school years. His teachers encouraged him to enter the physical education department in university.

Wang finished his elementary school in Tainan Municipal Dashe Elementary School. He finished his junior and senior high school at the Tainan First Senior High School in Tainan, where he was the team leader of the school's tennis team. After high school, Want attended National Taiwan Normal University and graduated with a Bachelor of Science (B.S.) in mathematics in 1965.

== Early career ==
Upon graduation, Wang worked as a mathematics teacher for a year at the Provincial Ging-Der Senior High School in Changhua County. His mentorship as a teacher is described as the turning point in businessman Samuel Yin’s life. After his mandatory military service in the Republic of China Military Police was completed, Wang returned home to work for the family-run food processing company dealing with export and import trade.

In early 1975, he represented his family business in the founding of Kaohsiung Industrial Association. He was elected as the director-in-chief of the association. His job involved travelling throughout Taiwan to inspect member factories and led to his entry into politics later that year.

== Political career ==
=== Legislative Yuan ===
Following his victory in the 1975 supplementary legislative election for the Kaohsiung County constituency, Wang took his seat in the Legislative Yuan on 1 February 1976 from being held by Huang Tung-shu previously. He has since been reelected eight times.

From 1976 until 1990, he was a member of the Finance Committee of the Legislative Yuan. In 1980, 1987 and 1990, Wang acted many times to assemble members of the Financial Committee and put his efforts forward in making some possible historical policies, such as introducing innovative tax system, opening up the establishment of security firms, lifting prohibition of setting up private banks, removing foreign exchange control schemes and other policies.

=== Kuomintang ===
On 10 April 1990, Wang was appointed as the vice chairman of the Central Policy Committee of the KMT, and then on 17 November 1990, he was appointed as the chairman of the Central Policy Committee's Finance Commission. Wang became the KMT's first director-general of the Committee on Coordination between Party and Government and the KMT caucus convener in the Legislative Yuan in 1992 following the retirement of all of Legislative Yuan first senior members on 31 December 1991. During that time, Wang was posted as KMT supervisor and started to search for a mechanism to make cross party negotiation possible.

On 27 August 1993, Wang was elected to become the member of KMT Central Committee, and subsequently the member of Central Standing Committee during the 14th nationwide representative meeting of the party.

=== China-Japan Parliamentary Member Interactions Association ===
In 1993, Wang was appointed as the director of China-Japan Parliamentary Member Interactions Association, where he became more active in promoting parliamentary diplomacy.

=== Taiwan Foundation for Democracy ===
In 2003 Wang was elected as the chairman of the Taiwan Foundation for Democracy, which was a democracy developing project set up by the Ministry of Foreign Affairs of the ROC.

=== Other organizations ===
Wang also holds other public welfare positions, such as the president of the Council for Taiwan Major League Baseball Association, board chairman of the Formosa Cancer Foundation, President of the Council for National Volunteer Fire Fighters' Association, honored board chairman of the Charity Mothers Association and honored board chairman of the National No-Barrier Space Development Association.

== Legislative Yuan vice presidency ==
On 1 February 1993, Wang became the KMT candidate for the nomination of vice president post of the Legislative Yuan. Supported by the majority, he secured his post and started to lead the congress. He renewed his three-year post in 1996, serving the post consecutively from 1 February 1993 until 31 January 1999.

During his office term, Wang successfully completed the passing of many important laws, such as the Self-governance Law for Provinces and Counties, Municipal Self-governance Law, National Health Insurance Law, February 28 Incident Disposition and Compensation Act, Joint Development Law, Presidential and vice presidential Election and Recall Law, Compulsory Automobile Liability Insurance Law, Government Procurement Law, Three Laws Pertaining to National Security, Three Laws Pertaining to Communication.

Wang was also actively involved in promoting congress diplomacy. He had represented the Legislative Yuan as vice president visiting abroad and also as representative to receive guests from foreign countries.

== Kuomintang vice chairmanship ==
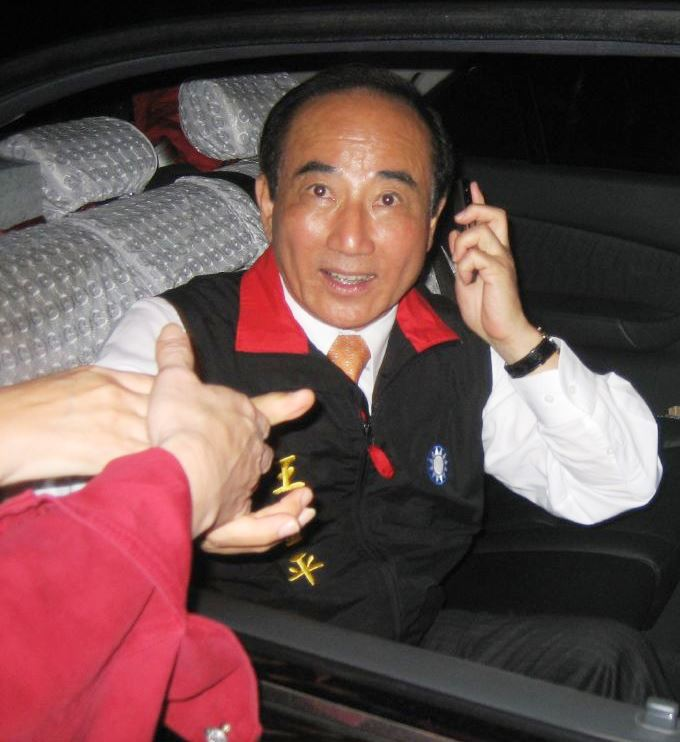
Wang during the 2008 ROC presidential election.

Wang had been the vice chairman of KMT in 2000–2005.

=== ROC presidential election ===
During the 2004 presidential election, he served as campaign manager for the Lien Chan and James Soong ticket. Considered part of the pro-localization faction in the KMT, his strong support and active campaigning for the Lien-Soong ticket was considered very significant as it blunted criticism that Lien-Soong were anti-Taiwan. There were calls, which he ignored, from many figures such as Lee Teng-hui for him to abandon Lien and join the Taiwan Solidarity Union before the election.

Prior to July 2005, he was, along with Ma Ying-jeou touted as possible presidential candidates for 2008. As a southerner, a native Hoklo speaker, and a legislator and person identified with the pro-localization faction of the Kuomintang, he was expected to provide balance to Ma Ying-jeou, who was rooted in northern Taiwan, and someone more identified with the unification-leaning parts of the party.

=== 2005 KMT chairmanship election ===
However, on 16 July 2005, Ma defeated Wang in the first competitive election for KMT chairmanship by a 72% to 28% margin, a margin larger than anticipated by either camp or news sources, despite Wang's receiving a last-minute endorsement by People First Party chairman James Soong, who had retained significant following within the KMT. Immediately after the election, Ma stated repeatedly that he wished Wang to remain as first-ranked deputy chairman. Wang, however, has so far rebuffed the gesture, instead stating that he wishes to serve as "permanent volunteer," and snubbed Ma by refusing to meet with him. Wang has, indeed, accepted a party post that is incompatible with vice chairmanship, effectively ending the possibility that he would be vice chairman, although after meeting with Wang, Ma said that he would "leave the position open" for Wang.

Candidate	Total votes cast	Percentage of vote
Ma Ying-jeou (W)	370,056	72.36%
Wang Jin-pyng	143,268	27.64%
Total eligible voters	1,045,467
Total ballots cast	524,487
Voter turnout	50.17%
Total ballots counted	518,324
Disqualified ballots	6,163

Most political commentators believe the KMT chairmanship election definitively put Ma Ying-jeou as the front-runner for the KMT nomination in 2008; this was proved correct as Ma won the KMT nomination for 2008 president on 2 May, virtually uncontested. Although Wang did not join the primary election, Wang has also not ruled out running as an independent. Though Ma had offered Wang the nomination as the KMT's vice presidential candidate, Wang recently declined the offer, saying that the pressure of being legislative Speaker was too great for him to be able to consider the offer. After weeks of talks and discussions among the Pan-Blue heavy weights including Lien, Wang, Wu and Ma, there was no agreement made to field a Ma-Wang President-Vice President ticket. At the end, Wang decided to turn down Ma's offer of Vice Presidency, but stated that he would do his utmost to support Ma in the upcoming election.

== Legislative Yuan presidency ==
=== 4th Legislative Yuan ===
Due to his easygoing nature and willingness to listen to differing perspectives, Wang was elected as president of the 4th Legislative Yuan on 1 February 1999 with a majority vote of 135 out of 225 seats. Within just one year after taking his new post, Wang promoted adjustments in organization, reinforced staff members, crossed party negotiation according to the five major Legislative Reorganization Act. By doing so, he opened a model in congress reform and contributed to the completion of discussion by the end of the 4th session.

During the first half of the session, Wang had passed a total of 60 new laws, confirming the plan to move Legislative Yuan to a new place. In the second half of the session, a total of 96 laws were passed, the second highest in ROC history when 148 laws were passed in 1948.

=== 5th Legislative Yuan ===
The KMT lost its majority for the first time in the 2001 legislative election, but through the narrow Pan-Blue Coalition majority, he was reelected president for the 5th Legislative Yuan on 1 February 2002. As Legislative Yuan President, Wang has gained a reputation of being a soft-spoken figure capable of reaching across party lines.

=== 6th Legislative Yuan ===
==== 2005 Busan APEC ====
In the APEC meeting at South Korea in late 2005, President Chen Shui-bian nominated Wang as the representative for Chinese Taipei, the designated name for ROC in APEC. The KMT approved of the nomination. This nomination did not become a reality, however, as the PRC pressured South Korea to ask for a second nomination. Despite lobbying by former South Korean president Kim Young-sam, who visited Chen in that time period, Chen was forced to name another person. This cat fight actually exacerbated Taiwan's image, as the summit yearbook did not even mention Taiwan's presence. The host explanation was that the second nomination was submitted well past the deadline for the yearbook.

=== 7th Legislative Yuan ===
Until 2011, Kuomintang legislators were barred from seeking an at-large third term. The restriction was lifted that year, for politicians who made "special contributions to the party, meet the needs of the party and have served as legislative speaker," and Wang continued serving as Yuan President.

During the final plenary session of the 7th Legislative Yuan on 14 December 2011, Wang said that the Yuan had passed a total of 896 bills and resolutions over the past four years, including the Special Statute for Distributing Consumption Vouchers for Revitalizing the Economy, Cross-Strait Economic Cooperation Framework Agreement and legislation regarding the 2G national health insurance program, gender equality and justice in housing. Wang encouraged the yuan to continue its oversight functions on behalf of the public in the future as a power to promote the development of Taiwan.

=== 8th Legislative Yuan ===
==== Influence peddling ====
On 7 September 2013, according to information gathered through wiretap recordings, President Ma Ying-Jeou accused Wang of influence peddling, a move that damages KMT reputation. The move came during Wang's trip to Malaysia to attend his daughter's wedding. Wang was officially expelled from the KMT on 11 September, disqualifying his eligibility to serve as a KMT legislator and ending his 14-year speakership tenure in the Legislative Yuan. The Special Investigation Division of the ROC Supreme Prosecutor Office accused Wang of illegally lobbying for Democratic Progressive Party caucus whip Ker Chien-ming in a breach of trust case by asking the then-minister of justice Tseng Yung-fu and the head prosecutor of Taiwan High Prosecutors Office Chen Shou-huang (陳守煌) to use their influence to stop an appeal of a not-guilty verdict for Ker.

On 11 September 2013, Wang sent an attorney to the Taipei District Court to file for an injunction for his KMT membership revocation. On 13 September 2013, the court approved Wang's request for which Wang had to put NT$9.38 million as a bail. This move ruled that Wang is still the member of Kuomintang and the president of Legislative Yuan until further notice. This court decision, however, is rejected by KMT chairman and president Ma Ying-jeou and announced that the party will file for a counter-appeal against the decision.

Many support movements around Taiwan were shown to support Wang. After the disciplinary action against Wang, 11 neighborhood wardens in Wang's hometown in Lujhu, Kaohsiung gave up their KMT membership. Wang called upon them to stay within they party. Upon Wang's arrival in Taiwan Taoyuan International Airport from Malaysia, thousands of supporters awaited him, including lawmaker Hung Hsiu-chu. People First Party Chairman James Soong criticized Ma regarding the allegation, citing that politics should have some humanity.

Support for President Ma Ying-jeou came from Wang Chien-shien, President of Control Yuan. He said that despite KMT legislators comprising about three-quarters, or 84 members out of total 113 seats in the Legislative Yuan, the KMT was still being held hostage by opposition Democratic Progressive Party, adding that KMT had accomplish nothing from 2008 until 2012 due to Wang Jin-pyng's inability to deal with people and negotiate.

The KMT officially lifted at large term limits for affiliated politicians who had previously served as leader of the legislature in October 2015.

== Later political career ==
On 7 March 2019, Wang announced his intention to contest the Kuomintang nomination for the 2020 Taiwan presidential election. He withdrew from the 2019 Kuomintang presidential primary on 6 June 2019. On 17 June, Wang reiterated, "I will run [for president] to the end, although it is difficult to explain how I will do that," though he would not consider leaving the Kuomintang or a vice presidential candidacy.

In November 2024 Wang opened a think tank focusing on publishing research on achieving peace between both sides of the Taiwan Strait. The think tank, named the Middle Way Peace Alliance, has board members including Kuomintang Vice Chairperson Andrew Hsia, Taiwan Democracy Foundation Director Liao Ta-chi, and others. The think thank aims to achieve cross-stait peace, peace generally, and Great Unity.

== Personal life ==
At the age of 28, on 26 March 1969 Wang met his then-future wife Chen Tsai-lien during the anniversary celebration of Shih Chien Home Economics College at the Feng-Lin Restaurant. It was love at the first sight and both felt a deep connection towards one another. They held their engagement ceremony at Mandarina Crown Hotel.

In 2021, Wang received Japan's Grand Cordon of the Order of the Rising Sun, for his contributions to "enhancing mutual friendship and understanding between Taiwan and Japan.".

Preceded by Liu Sung-pan	President of the Legislative Yuan; 1 February 1999—31 January 2016	Succeeded by Su Jia-chyuan
