= World League for Freedom and Democracy =

Non-governmental organization of anti-communists

- Logo of the World League for Freedom and Democracy
- Abbreviation: WLFD
- Predecessor: Asian Peoples' Anti-Communist League
- Formation: 1966
- Founded at: Taipei, Taiwan
- Headquarters: Taipei, Taiwan
- Secretary General: Ger Yeong Kuang (葛永光)
- President: Ku Cheng-kang (Eternal); Yao Eng-chi
- Budget: 22 million TWD (2017)
- Website: wlfdroc.org.tw
- Formerly called: World Anti-Communist League

The World League for Freedom and Democracy (WLFD) is an international non-governmental organization of anti-communist politicians and groups. It was founded in 1954 as the Asian Peoples' Anti-Communist League (APACL) under the initiative of Chiang Kai-shek, leader of the Republic of China (first on Mainland China, after 1949 on Taiwan) and retired General Charles A. Willoughby and established by Ku Cheng-kang. During the Cold War, WACL actively participated in anti-communist and anti-Soviet positions.

In 1990, the organization changed to its current name, but has preserved its traditions and former ties. It unites representatives from more than 100 countries and has eight regional divisions. It has its headquarters in Taipei, Taiwan.

== History ==
The WLFD descended from the Asian Peoples' Anti-Communist League. Chiang Kai-shek of the Republic of China (ROC) on Taiwan, Elpidio Quirino of the Republic of the Philippines, and Syngman Rhee of the Republic of Korea founded the APACL in Jinhae, the wartime capital city of the Republic of Korea (ROK) on 15 June 1954. Its first general conference was held in that city and was hosted to advocate and support the causes of anti-communism. The other participating states, including South Vietnam, Thailand, Okinawa, Japan, Hong Kong, and Macau also sent representatives.

=== World Freedom Day ===
World Freedom Day
- Date: 23 January
- Next time: 23 January 2027
- Frequency: annual

World Freedom Day Chinese: 世界自由日; pinyin: Shìjièzìyóurì) is a memorial day celebrated on 23 January in Taiwan and South Korea. In Taiwan, the event is also known as 123 Freedom Day (Chinese: 一二三自由日), due to a hand gesture devised by the Voice of Justice. The thumb (one) represents freedom, the V sign is two, and the third finger represents the Three Principles of the People. World Freedom Day marks the return of some 22,000 ex-communist war prisoners of the Korean War (1950–1953) to Taiwan, of whom 14,000 captured Chinese military defectors arrived at Keelung Harbor on 23 January 1954, and were given the title "Anti-Communist Heroes". The Republic of China (ROC) government subsequently declared 23 January as World Freedom Day to honor these soldiers, and created the "Anti-Communist League" (which later became the World League for Freedom and Democracy) to fight communist expansion worldwide. The league is led by President Yao Eng-chi, a former Kuomintang-MP and Secretary-General Ger Yeong-kuang, a professor of political science at National Taiwan University. Every year World Freedom Day Celebrations are held in Taiwan, and the event is attended by both local and foreign delegates from all over the world. Usually, the president of the ROC delivers congratulations, and cultural events are held.

=== Asian Pacific League for Freedom and Democracy ===
The Asian Pacific League for Freedom and Democracy (APLFD) was founded in 1954 as the Asian Peoples' Anti-Communist League in Chinhae, South Korea with the support of the governments of the Philippines, South Korea and Taiwan (as the Republic of China). The APLFD is a non-profit international organization for interchanges among the Asians for peace and prosperity of the region.

The APLFD was founded in the same year and under the same international background as the forming of the South East Asia Treaty Organization (SEATO), or the Manila Pact, in 1954, when the Second World War had concluded. However, while the SEATO (1954–1977) was sort of an Asian Nato in nature, the APLFD is a people's organization trying to secure peace and prosperity through ideas and convictions and friendship.

Having founded the APACL, the government of the Republic of China prepared to organize the second conference and chose Taipei City as the place to set up the Republic of China Chapter of the APACL on 1 July 1954. Ku Cheng-kang, President of the Chinese Refugees Relief Association of the Republic of China, was designated as the first president of this Chapter. Over the years, successors to the presidency of the Republic of China Chapter are Clement C. P. Chang, Chao Tzu-chi, Yao Eng-chi, and Tseng Yung-chuan. As of 2013 the president was Yao Eng-chi, former Vice President of the ROC Legislative Yuan (Parliament) and also Senior Advisor to the President of the Republic of China on Taiwan.

In the 1960s the APACL established contacts with the 'American Friends of the Anti-Bolshevik Bloc of Nations' in the United States through Spas T. Raikin.

=== World Anti-Communist League ===
In 1966 the memberships of the APACL had increased to 27, in Asia, Australia, and Africa. At its 12th Conference in Seoul on 3 November 1966, a fifteen-member committee was formed to discuss the expansion of this organization. The committee eventually decided to set up a new anti-communist organization, including the APACL, regional organizations, and an international anti-communist organization. On 7 November 1966, the delegates adopted the "Charter of the World Anti-Communist League" at the plenary session. It also resolved that the Republic of China Chapter was in charge of organizing the first General Conference.

The Charter of the World Anti-Communist League (WACL), with 8 chapters and 32 articles, came into effect on 1 April 1967. It stated that the WACL should immediately set up its regional organizations in six regions: Asia (now known as Asian Pacific League for Freedom and Democracy), the Middle East (now known as Middle East Solidarity Council), Africa (now known as the African Organization for Freedom and Democracy), and Europe (now known as the European Council for World Freedom), North America (now known as the North American Federation for Freedom and Democracy), and Latin America (now known as the Federation of Latin American Democratic Organization). The organization in the Asian region was the main force to push for the mission of the World League.

=== Renaming ===
To adjust to the worldwide political changes after the dissolution of the Soviet Union and the end of the Cold War and to strive for recruiting more people to join, the WACL held its 22nd General Conference in Brussels, Belgium on 23 July 1990, and the delegates resolved that the organization should be renamed the "World League for Freedom and Democracy" (WLFD). This resolution came into effect on 1 January 1991.

Between 1989 and 1997, the World League for Freedom and Democracy was led by Chao Tze-chi, who later discussed the process of renaming and restructuring the organization in an oral history interview conducted by Academia Historica. According to Chao, the initiative to abandon the organization’s earlier anti-communist designation and adopt a broader framework centered on freedom and democracy emerged from his interactions with Chinese democracy activists in the aftermath of the 1989 Tiananmen Square protests.

Chao recalled that after the Tiananmen incident, overseas Chinese democracy activists organized a so-called “Democracy Boat” to promote democratic ideals. When the vessel planned to dock in Keelung, Yan Jiaqi contacted Chao in advance and requested assistance in receiving the delegation in Taiwan. Despite concerns raised by senior Kuomintang officials over possible political risks, Chao proceeded with arrangements to host the visitors and facilitate meetings with Taiwanese journalists and civil society figures.

I accompanied Yan Jiaqi and others to the venue and invited Yan to take a seat at the head table and deliver remarks on stage, but Yan insisted on remaining at his original seat and only expressed his thanks from there, refusing to go up to the stage. During the meal, I asked him the reason. He then leaned close to my ear and told me that although he was engaged in the democratic movement, he could not be labeled as anti-communist. Behind the head table there was a banner reading “The Anti-Communist Patriotic Alliance Welcomes the Democracy Boat to Taiwan.” If he were to sit there, the anti-communist wording behind him would immediately be transmitted back to the mainland, which would be detrimental to his family. Yan Jiaqi’s words not only revealed to me the fear of the Chinese Communist Party, but also prompted my motivation to revise the APACL charter and change the organization’s name.

Chao stated that following this episode, he reassessed the future direction of the organization and concluded that for the League to remain viable, it needed to shed its earlier anti-communist nomenclature, establish a fully empowered central leadership, and maintain a permanent headquarters capable of supervising routine operations. He noted that renaming the organization was a major undertaking requiring consultation with senior figures, many of whom initially opposed the proposal. Nevertheless, Chao proceeded to consult legal and political scholars and formulated a four-part plan: revising the charter and changing the name; establishing a general headquarters; electing a president of the headquarters; and locating the headquarters in Taipei.

According to Chao, these proposals were presented at the 22nd General Assembly of the World Anti-Communist League, held in Brussels on 23 July 1990. While most national chapter leaders supported renaming the organization as the World League for Freedom and Democracy, reservations remained regarding the establishment of a headquarters and the election of a president. Chao recalled that consensus was reached only after he agreed to stand as a candidate for the presidency.

Chao further described his efforts during the assembly to engage delegates from 58 countries by grouping them according to language and holding discussions during meals and informal gatherings. Through these exchanges, he identified structural weaknesses in the organization, including the prevalence of single-person national chapters and limited coordination outside formal conferences. Based on these observations, Chao proposed a comprehensive reform package that included renaming the organization, establishing a global headquarters, reorganizing national chapters into six regional groupings, instituting fixed presidential terms, and creating a permanent headquarters modeled in part on the organizational structure of the United Nations, with the aim of advancing the League’s role as an international non-governmental organization.

Regarding the renaming, I immediately encountered opposition from the Korean delegation. At the time, Korea was represented by General Chung Il-kwon and General Kim Yong-kwang. Kim spoke on behalf of the delegation, proposing that the organization be renamed simply the “Freedom League,” and worked to secure support from the Japanese delegation. I considered this to fall within the authority of the General Assembly, and therefore decided to convene a twenty-five-member committee to determine that the name should be changed to the “World League for Freedom and Democracy.” The committee adopted resolutions to strengthen contacts with Eastern European countries and to promote support and assistance from the free world to Eastern Europe, as well as to counter communist forces in Asia and encourage them to carry out democratic reforms in response to popular opinion.

After the Assembly concluded, the twenty-five-member committee resumed deliberations at nine o’clock in the evening and continued until midnight without reaching a conclusion. During the discussions, I emphasized that “without democracy, there can be no true anti-communism; if one speaks only of freedom without democracy, the ultimate result is not anti-communism at all.” After midnight, we took a ten-minute recess. I had intended to use the break for informal consultations. While holding a cup of coffee and speaking with Australian parliamentarian Goodluck, I was struck by other delegates who were running about in heated argument, and I collided with a hard wooden doorframe, spilling coffee all over the floor.

After the recess, the meeting resumed. As the dispute remained unresolved, the matter was put directly to a vote. The Korean side received four votes, while we received eighteen. The result was announced by Secretary-General Jason Hu. The Korean delegation immediately withdrew in protest. After the meeting, I asked the Korean representatives for the reason. Only then did I learn that their parliament had appropriated a budget under the designation “Freedom League,” and that a change of name might result in the cancellation of that budget. I therefore asked Jason Hu to immediately speak with the Korean delegation to prevent lingering resentment.

The following morning, I hosted the Korean delegation for breakfast. The meal was a Western-style buffet. I asked the restaurant to divide the space with folding screens and invited the Korean delegates to sit together. The screens were decorated with imperial palace paintings from Beijing, eight or nine feet high and quite heavy. Upon meeting me, Kim Yong-kwang said, “Congratulations on our victory,” in a distinctly displeased tone. Later, as people helped themselves to food, Kim Yong-kwang stepped behind one of the screens and tripped over its base. When I went to help him up, his foot knocked over the screen, which fell directly onto my head. I immediately sat down, unable to move, and felt as though I were suffering from a concussion. Even so, I first attended to the situation and succeeded in bringing the Assembly to a smooth conclusion.

On 21 August 1991, with the new name, the WLFD held its 23rd General Conference in San Jose, Costa Rica. Rafael Ángel Calderón Fournier, President of Costa Rica, and vice presidents from six countries in Latin America, gave speeches. The conference passed a resolution to set up the Presidency of League, a new post to highlight the leading center of the WLFD and also to take responsibility to organize WLFD activities. Chao Tze-chi, President of the Republic of China Chapter of WLFD, was elected as the first President of the WLFD, and re-elected in 1995. U Chae-sung of the ROK was named as the Secretary-General.

On 19 January 2006, the WLFD adopted its charter amendment in the 34th General Conference. According to the Amendment, the President of the League shall be "the top official of the League" and shall represent the League, and shall supervise the performance and development of the League in compliance with the charter. According to the previous charter of the WLFD, the President of the League shall be "the Leader of the League" and shall represent the League. This person shall supervise the performance and development of the League in compliance with the charter.

According to the Charter of the WLFD, the President of the League shall be elected by and from the members of the executive board of the League. The result of the election shall be reported to the General Conference. The President shall hold office for a term of four years and shall be eligible for re-election. In October 2000, all members of the executive board approved Yao Eng-chi, President of the WLFD ROC Chapter, as the third President of the League during the Executive Board Meeting in New York City The executive board also amended the charter to add several positions such as four vice presidents and two deputy secretaries-general. The decision made by the executive board was also confirmed by the members at the 31st WLFD General Conference in Taipei, ROC, on 13 January 2001. President Yao Eng-chi was re-elected as President of the League at the 33rd WLFD General Conference in Melbourne, Australia, on 20 December 2003. Ger Yeong-kuang was named as Secretary-General of the League. On 1 August 2008, Ger resigned and was succeeded by Hsieh Wen-huang, Parliamentary Assistant to Vice President Tseng Yung-chuan of the ROC Legislative Yuan (Parliament). Hsieh resigned; Chou Yujen's was nominated to replace him on 23 January 2013.

== Membership ==
According to the charter, national, regional or international organizations that subscribe to the purposes of the League are eligible for membership. Membership shall consist of Regular Members with voting rights and Associate Members without voting rights.

The Asian Pacific League for Freedom and Democracy (APLFD) was formed in 1954 as the Asian Peoples' Anti-Communist League. The APLFD Secretariat was first established in Saigon, Vietnam in 1957; then the Secretariat moved to Manila in 1964. Three years later, the Secretariat moved back again to Saigon until its fall in 1975. After some compromise and a resolution, the APLFD Secretariat was re-established in Taipei, Taiwan in 1976 where it remains active. In 1983, at its conference in Fiji, it changed its name to the Asian Pacific Democratic League.

The APLFD has 18 member nations. It holds an annual conference every year.

The number of members in Denmark is unknown, but several politicians have or have been connected to the organization. Progress Party leader Pia Kjærsgaard participated in 1988 as WACL's guest at the organization's congress in Taipei. The Danish WACL leader has been municipal politician Erik Dissing.

The French chapter was headed by Suzanne Labin. The president of the German section as of 2012 has been Axel Fischer.

In Sweden, a department of WACL was established in 1967. The Swedish organization has been characterized by strong participation among exiled Estonians. Among the member organizations in the late 1960s were Democratic Alliance, Baltic Committee, Nordic War and UN Veterans Association and the Committee for a Free Asia. The National League of Sweden was also linked to the organization for some time. Swedish chairman has been Birger Nerman (1967–70), Arvo Horm (1970–1984), Birger Hagård (1984–88) and Åke J. Ek (1988–2011).

== Controversies ==
In 1978, British anticommunist activist Geoffrey Stewart-Smith, who led the British affiliate out of WACL, declared that despite a publicized housecleaning, "The World Anti-Communist League is largely a collection of Nazis, Fascists, anti-Semites, sellers of forgeries, vicious racialists, and corrupt self-seekers. It has evolved into an anti-Semitic international."

In 1978, Roger Pearson became the World Chairman of the WACL. Pearson was described in a Washington Post article as having neo-Nazi associations and sources report that as a result of an article in The Washington Post in 1978 critical of WACL and alleging extreme right wing politics of Pearson that either he was expelled from WACL or at least was pressured into resigning from his position as World chairman.

The US chapter of WACL, the United States Council for World Freedom (USCWF) was founded in 1981 by Major General John K. Singlaub. Singlaub was the former US Chief of Staff of both United Nations and American forces in South Korea, but was relieved in 1977 by U.S. President Jimmy Carter after publicly criticizing Carter's decision to reduce the number of troops on the peninsula. Singlaub became a member of the WACL in 1980, and founded and became president of its U.S. chapter, the United States Council for World Freedom. This branch generated controversy when it supported Nicaraguan guerrillas in the Iran–Contra affair and, in 1981, the USCWF was placed under watch by the Anti-Defamation League, which said that the organization had increasingly become "a point of contact for extremists, racists, and anti-Semites". During the 1980s, the USCWF and WACL conducted a purge of these elements, and invited ADL observers to monitor its conferences; by 1985, the Anti-Defamation League declared itself "satisfied that substantial progress has been made since 1981 in ridding the organization of racists and anti-Semites."

It is alleged that in the mid-1980s WACL had become a supplier of arms to anti-communist rebel movements in southern Africa, Central America, Afghanistan and the Far East. During the 1980s, the WACL was particularly active in Latin America, notably by aiding the Contra forces in Nicaragua. During this period, WACL was criticized for its presence in the organization of neo-Nazis, war criminals, and people linked to death squads and assassinations. Other allegations have included reports claim that the World League for Freedom and Democracy is responsible for producing what its opponents call "troops of killers", while ostensibly organizing to provide support for Corazon Aquino from the right-wing in the Philippines and for supporting the Mozambican National Resistance (RENAMO) movement in Mozambique.

The World Anti-Communist League held annual conferences at various locations throughout the world. Numerous groups participated, including the Unification Church of the Rev. Sun Myung Moon. WACL also enjoyed support from many U.S. Congressmen, most notably 2008 presidential nominee Senator John McCain (R-AZ), who sat on the United States Council for World Freedom (USCWF) Board of Directors in the early 1980s. When his membership was brought up during the election, McCain said he resigned from the council in 1984. In 1986, he asked to have his name removed from the group's letterhead. However, there was absolutely no evidence that McCain had ever resigned or asked for his name's removal from the United States Council for World Freedom.

=== Controversial participants of WACL conferences ===
Numerous Nazi collaborators and Latin American death squads were active in the World Anti-Communist League. Some prominent individuals who attended conferences included:

- Ryōichi Sasakawa, Fascist and billionaire jailed as a suspected war criminal after World War II
- Reverend Sun Myung Moon, head of the Unification Church (Moon sect)
- Yoshio Kodama, behind-the-scenes power broker and uyoku from Japan
- Osami Kuboki, member of the Moon sect, president of the International Federation for Victory over Communism (IFVC) and the Japanese Unification Church
- Mario Sandoval Alarcón, Guatemalan politician, "Godfather" of Central American death squads
- Giorgio Almirante, founder and leader of neo-fascist Italian Social Movement
- Dsmitryj Kasmowitsch, the Belarusian policeman of Smolensk, who was responsible for fighting partisans
- Theodor Oberländer, Nazi German politician in the NSDAP, participant in the Beer Hall Putsch, Oberleutnant of the Nachtigall Battalion
- Otto Skorzeny, Austrian Nazi German SS-Obersturmbannführer
- Alfredo Stroessner, dictator of Paraguay

== See also ==
- American Committee for the Liberation of the Peoples of Russia
- American Security Council
- Anti-Bolshevik Bloc of Nations
- Australian League of Rights
- Bamboo Curtain
- British League of Rights
- Captive Nations
- Croatian Liberation Movement
- Le Cercle
- Western Goals Institute
- Western Goals Foundation
- Los TECOS
