= 3rd Congress =

3rd Congress may refer to:

- 3rd Congress of the Philippines (1954–1957)
- 3rd Congress of the Russian Social Democratic Labour Party (1905)
- 3rd Congress of the Workers' Party of Korea (1956)
- 3rd National Congress of the Chinese Communist Party (1923)
- 3rd National Congress of the Kuomintang (1929)
- 3rd National Congress of the Lao People's Revolutionary Party (1982)
- 3rd National People's Congress (1964–1975)
- 3rd United States Congress (1793–1795)
- 3rd World Congress of the Comintern (1921)
- Brussels Congress (1868), the 3rd Congress of the First International
- International Socialist Workers Congress, Zürich 1893, the 3rd Congress of the Second International
