= Standing Committee of the Central Committee of the Kuomintang =

Standing Committee of the Central Committee of the Kuomintang 中國國民黨中央委員會常務委員會

Information
- Chairman: Eric Chu
- Vice Chairpersons: Huang Min-hui; Andrew Hsia; Sean Lien
- Responsible to: Central Committee

The Standing Committee of the Central Committee of the Kuomintang (Chinese: 中國國民黨中央委員會常務委員會), commonly referred to as the Central Standing Committee (Chinese: 中常會; pinyin: Zhōngchánghuì), is the highest decision-making body within the Central Committee of the Kuomintang (KMT). It serves as the permanent executive body of the Central Committee. On the mainland, it was replaced by the Standing Committee of the Politburo the Chinese Communist Party after the communist victory in the Chinese Civil War.

== Structure ==
According to the KMT Party Constitution, "During the recess of the full meetings of the Central Committee, the Standing Committee of the Central Committee is responsible for executing its duties and is accountable to it." The current Party Constitution stipulates that the Chairman of the Kuomintang serves as the head of the Standing Committee, presiding over its meetings. The Vice Chairman is an ex-officio member of the Standing Committee.

The Standing Committee is composed of several members (中常委), who are elected from among the members of the Central Committee by the delegates at the National Party Congress and appointed by the chairman. Each member's term of office is two years.

According to Article 22 of the Party Constitution, the Standing Committee is composed of 35 to 40 members, including: 1. 29 members elected by the National Party Congress delegates from the Central Committee members. 2. 6 to 11 members appointed by the chairman, including senior members of the Party, the Chairman of the Youth League, and the President of the National Youth Work Association.

The Standing Committee meets every Wednesday afternoon at the KMT's Central Party Headquarters in Taipei.

== Historical membership and rankings ==
Source: 7th Central Committee of the Kuomintang (1952–1957)

- Chairman: Chiang Kai-shek
- Standing Committee Members (in order):
1. Chen Cheng
2. Chang Tao-fan
3. Ku Cheng-kang
4. K. C. Wu
5. Huang Shao-ku
6. Chen Hsueh-ping
7. Yuan Shouqian
8. 陶希聖
9. Chiang Ching-kuo
10. Ni Wenya

8th Central Committee of the Kuomintang (1957–1963)

- Chairman: Chiang Kai-shek
- Vice Chairman: Chen Cheng
- Standing Committee Members (in order):
1. Chang Tao-fan
2. Ku Cheng-kang
3. Yu Hung-chun
4. 周至柔
5. Chen Hsueh-ping
6. 陶希聖
7. Chiang Ching-kuo
8. Huang Shao-ku
9. Chang Ch'i-yun
10. Hu Chien-chung
11. 邱念台
12. 馬紀壯
13. Yuan Shouqian
14. 谷鳳翔
15. Shen Chang-huan

9th Central Committee of the Kuomintang (1963–1969)

- Chairman: Chiang Kai-shek
- Vice Chairman: Chen Cheng
- Standing Committee Members (in order):
1. Chang Tao-fan
2. Ku Cheng-kang
3. 周至柔
4. Chang Ch'i-yun
5. Peng Meng-chi
6. Huang Chieh
7. Chiang Ching-kuo
8. Yuan Shouqian
9. 陶希聖
10. Ni Wenya
11. 谷鳳翔
12. Zheng Yanfen
13. Huang Chao-chin
14. Hu Chien-chung
15. Hsieh Tung-min

10th Central Committee of the Kuomintang (1969–1976)

- Chairman: Chiang Kai-shek (succeeded by Chiang Ching-kuo in 1975)
- Standing Committee Members (in order):
1. Yen Chia-kan
2. Chiang Ching-kuo
3. Ku Cheng-kang
4. Chang Ch'i-yun
5. Huang Shao-ku
6. 周至柔
7. Huang Chieh
8. Yuan Shouqian
9. Ni Wenya
10. Zheng Yanfen
11. Hu Chien-chung
12. Hsieh Tung-min
13. Chen Ta-ching
14. Kuo Cheng
15. 郭驥
16. 高魁元
17. 蔣彥士
18. Yen Chen-hsing
19. Sun Yun-suan
20. Li Kwoh-ting
21. 林挺生

11th Central Committee of the Kuomintang (1976–1981)

- Chairman: Chiang Ching-kuo
- Standing Committee Members (in order):
1. Yen Chia-kan
2. Ku Cheng-kang
3. Hsieh Tung-min
4. Huang Shao-ku
5. Chang Ch'i-yun
6. Huang Chieh
7. Ni Wenya
8. Yuan Shouqian
9. 高魁元
10. 宋長志
11. Sun Yun-suan
12. Li Kwoh-ting
13. 蔣彥士
14. Shen Chang-huan
15. Zheng Yanfen
16. Lin Chin-sheng
17. 郭驥
18. 林挺生
19. 費驊
20. Hsu Ching-chung
21. Kuo Cheng
22. 蔡鴻文

12th Central Committee of the Kuomintang (1981–1988)

- Chairman: Chiang Ching-kuo (succeeded by Lee Teng-hui in 1975)
- Standing Committee Members (in order):
1. Yen Chia-kan
2. Hsieh Tung-min
3. Sun Yun-suan
4. Ku Cheng-kang
5. Huang Shao-ku
6. Ni Wenya
7. Yuan Shouqian
8. 馬紀壯
9. Li Kwoh-ting
10. 高魁元
11. 宋長志
12. 趙聚鈺
13. Wang Tiwu
14. Wang Sheng
15. Lee Teng-hui
16. Yu Kuo-hwa
17. 余紀忠
18. Lin Yang-kang
19. Shen Chang-huan
20. 洪壽南
21. 蔡鴻文
22. Lin Chin-sheng
23. Koo Chen-fu
24. 閻振興
25. 曹聖芬
26. 林挺生

13th Central Committee of the Kuomintang (1988–1993)

- Chairman: Lee Teng-hui
- Standing Committee Members (in order):
1. Hsieh Tung-min
2. Li Kwoh-ting
3. Ni Wenya
4. Yu Kuo-hwa
5. Lee Huan
6. Shen Chang-huan
7. Lin Yang-kang
8. Chiu Chuang-huan
9. 黃尊秋
10. Hau Pei-tsun
11. 何宜武
12. James Soong
13. Wu Po-hsiung
14. Fredrick Chien
15. Chen Li-an
16. Lien Chan
17. Shih Chi-yang
18. Cheng Wei-yuan
19. Mao Kao-wen
20. Hsu Li-nung
21. Koo Chen-fu
22. Kao Yu-jen
23. Hsu Shui-teh
24. Clement Chang
25. Chao Tzu-chi
26. 曾廣順
27. Shirley Kuo
28. Su Nan-cheng
29. Chen Tien-miao
30. Hsu Sheng-fa
31. Hsieh Shen-shan
