= Anti-Communist Hero =

Title given by the government of the Republic of China

- Traditional Chinese: 反共義士
- Simplified Chinese: 反共义士
- Literal meaning: anti-communist righteous man
Transcriptions
Standard Mandarin
- Hanyu Pinyin: fǎngòng yìshì

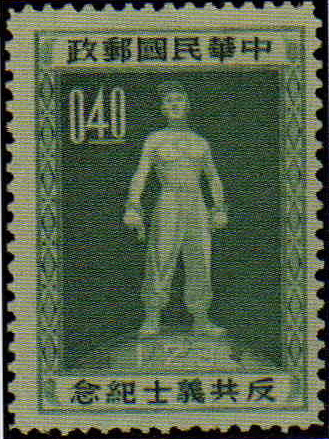
A 1955 stamp from Taiwan commemorating the Anti-Communist Martyrs.

Anti-Communist Hero (Chinese: 反共義士) was the title given by the Republic of China government in Taiwan to defectors from People's Republic of China during the Korean War and the Cold War. The title was first given on 23 January 1954 to 14,000 prisoners of war from the People's Volunteer Army who defected to the Republic of China on Taiwan. Most of them were former Kuomintang soldiers taken captive by the communist forces during the Chinese Civil War. The defectors were tattooed with anti-communist slogans and the Republic of China flag before coming to Taiwan. The memorial day World Freedom Day was founded in their honor.

The title was later given to a number of PLAAF defectors who also surrendered their aircraft, providing valuable insight into PRC aircraft technology. Until 1989, PRC military-affiliated defectors were given positions in the ROC military and financially rewarded. The title was revoked from some military-affiliated defectors who later returned to China. The title was abolished in 1991, following the end of martial law in Taiwan and the thawing of cross-strait relations.
