= Yao Eng-chi =

Taiwanese politician (1934–2026)

- 饒穎奇
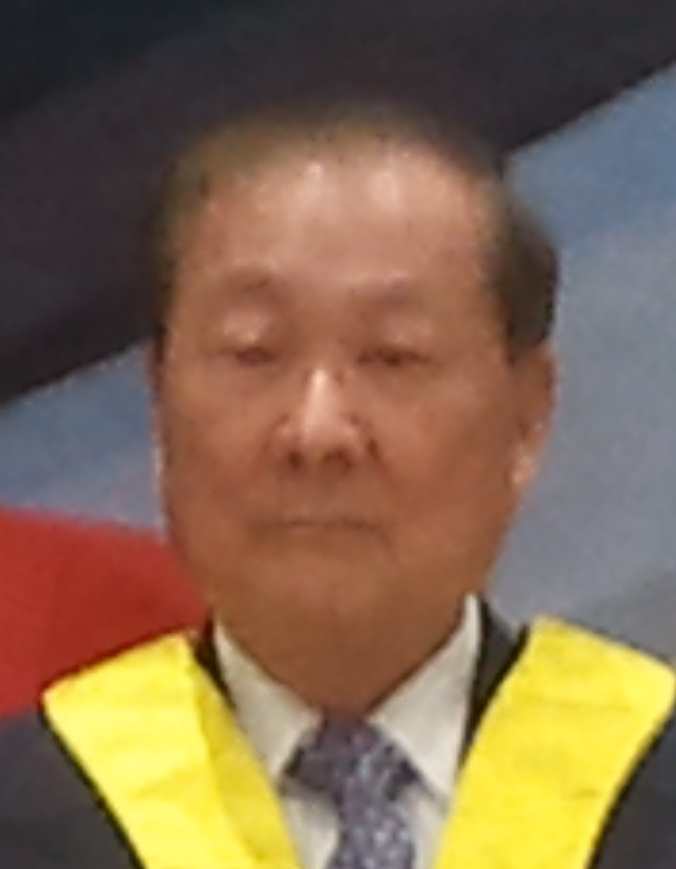

4th Chairman of the World League for Freedom and Democracy
- In office 1997–2006
- Preceded by: Chao Tzu-chi
- Succeeded by: Tseng Yung-chuan

Vice President of the Legislative Yuan
- In office 1 February 1999 – 31 January 2002
- Preceded by: Wang Jin-pyng
- Succeeded by: Chiang Pin-kung

Member of the Legislative Yuan
- In office 1 February 1981 – 31 January 2005
- Constituency: Taitung County (1990–2005); Taiwan Province, 6th district (1981–1990)

Personal details
- Born: 5 November 1934 Taitung County, Taiwan, Empire of Japan
- Died: 21 August 2026 (aged 91) Beinan, Taitung, Taiwan
- Party: Kuomintang
- Children: Yao Ching-ling

Yao Eng-chi (Chinese: 饒穎奇; pinyin: Ráo Yǐngqí; 5 November 1934 – 21 August 2026) was a Taiwanese politician, who was a member of the Kuomintang.

Yao died on 21 August 2026, at the age of 91. At the time of his death, his daughter Yao Ching-ling, was serving her second term as the magistrate of Taitung County. In September 2026, Lai Ching-te posthumously awarded Yao Eng-chi a presidential citation.

== Sources ==
- 立法院全球資訊網－立法委員－饒穎奇委員簡介
- 立法院全球資訊網－立法委員－饒穎奇委員簡介
- 立法院全球資訊網－立法委員－饒穎奇委員簡介
- 立法院全球資訊網－立法委員－饒穎奇委員簡介
- 立法院全球資訊網－立法委員－饒穎奇委員簡介
