= 20th Congress =

20th Congress may refer to:

- 20th Congress of the Communist Party of the Soviet Union (1956)
- 20th Congress of the Philippines (2025–2028)
- 20th National Congress of the Chinese Communist Party (2022)
- 20th National Congress of the Kuomintang (2017–2020)
- 20th United States Congress (1827–1829)
