= James Chen =

James Chen is the name of:

- James Chen (actor), Chinese-American actor
- Chen Chien-chih, known as James, Taiwanese politician
- Chen Tsu-li (born 1932), known as James, Taiwanese basketball player
- Zhijian Chen (born 1966), known as James, Chinese-American biochemist
