= Amado Yuzon =

Filipino academic, journalist, politician and writer

The Honorable Amado Yuzon
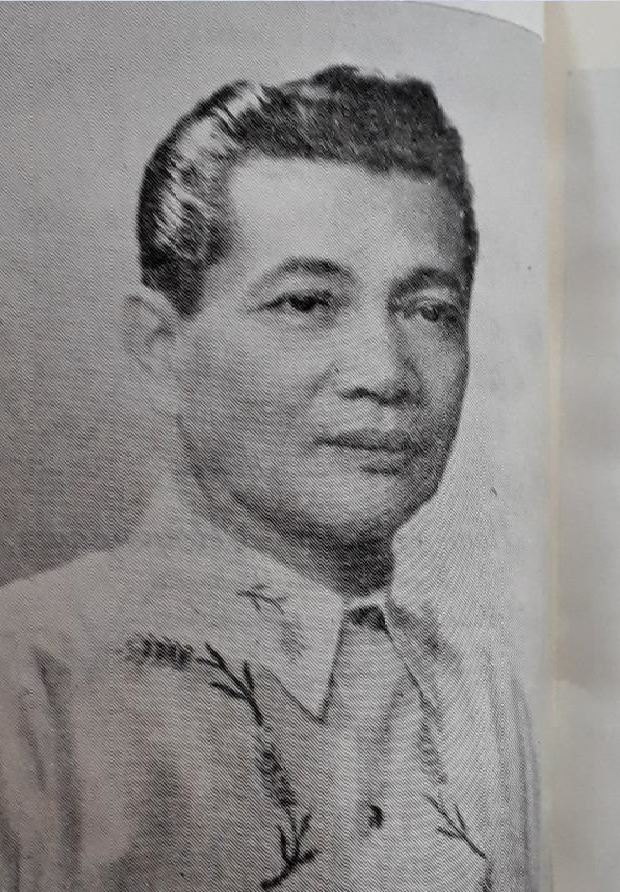
- Yuzon in 1959

Member of the House of Representatives from Pampanga's 1st district
- In office May 25, 1946 – December 30, 1949
- Preceded by: Eligio Lagman
- Succeeded by: Diosdado Macapagal

Personal details
- Born: Amado Magcalas Yuzon; August 30, 1906 Guagua, Pampanga, Philippine Islands, U.S.
- Died: January 17, 1979 (aged 72) Manila, Philippines
- Party: Democratic Alliance
- Spouse(s): Olivia A. Reyes; Fortunata Aquino; Ligaya Viceral
- Children: 7
- Parent(s): Felipe Yuzon; Isabel Magcalas
- Education: Far Eastern University; Manuel L. Quezon University
- Occupation: Academic, journalist, politician, writer

Amado Magcalas Yuzon (August 30, 1906 – January 17, 1979) was a Filipino academic, journalist, politician and writer.

== Biography ==
Yuzon graduated from Pampanga High School in San Fernando in 1925. He obtained a Master of Arts, Master of Science in Business Administration, Ll. M, and Litt. D. He was a member of the Philippine Bar Examination and professor at the Far Eastern University and at Quezon College in Manila. Among his edited journals are "Ing Catuliran" and "La Libertad".

During the Japanese occupation of the Philippines, Yuzon was a minor government employee.

From 1946 to 1949, Yuzon was member of the Congress of the Philippines, where he represented Pampanga. He had been elected as a Democratic Alliance candidate. Yuzon's candidature had sparked controversy at the fourth national congress of the Communist Party of the Philippines, where Pampanga delegates had walked out in protest against the opposition of the politburo majority to Yuzon's candidature. Yuzon was however, once elected, barred from taking his seat in the parliament.

In 1963, Yuzon founded the United Poets Laureate International, an international group for passionate poets from countries all over the world aiming to promote global peace, brotherhood, and understanding through poetry. It was nominated for the 1967 Nobel Peace Prize by Filipino legislator Angel Macapagal.

Amado Yuzon was first married to Oliva Almario Reyes; they had three sons. His second marriage to Fortunata Quiambao Aquino (daughter of Servillano Aquino and sister of Benigno Aquino Sr.) produced four children: Virgilio, Maria Teresa, Maria Remedios, and Maria Lourdes. Maria Teresa died at the age of two.

== Opus ==
=== Poetry collections ===
- Ding Capampangan (1940)
- Ing Kakung Dampa (1944)
- Poems for Screen Heroines (1949)
- The Citizen's Poems (1956)

=== Essays ===
- Salitang paca-versu sinukuan at aliwa pa, declamaciones, leyendas ding sampanga (1933)
- The Passion of Rizal, Poet and Martyr, and his "Postrer Adios" with Some Foreign Versions (1977)

=== Translations ===
- Translations of works by Shakespeare, Omar Khayyam, Rabindranath Tagore, Euripides, Sophocles, Victor Hugo, Sappho, Edgar Allan Poe, Henry Wadsworth Longfellow, and others.

== Awards and honours ==
- Inclusion in the 1956 "Who's Who in America", the "International Who's Who in Poetry", and "The Authors and Writers Who's Who"
- "most outstanding poet in 1957" by Central Luzon Affair
- Poet Laureate of the Philippines in 1959
- Most Outstanding Man of Letters of the Philippines in 1962 by Filipino Press, Radio and Television Society
- Nominated for the 1970 Nobel Prize in Literature by Emeterio Barcelon y Barcelo-Soriano of Academia Filipina and Zhong Dingwen of The Chinese Poet Society, Taipei, Taiwan. In 1973, he was nominated once again by Emeterio Barcelon y Barcelo-Soriano only.

== See also ==
- Kapampangan language
- List of Filipino Nobel laureates and nominees
