= 4th National Congress of the Communist Party of the Philippines =

The fourth national congress of the Communist Party of the Philippines was held February 24-28, 1946, at Quality Club, Rizal Avenue in Manila. With around 1,200 delegates attending, it was the largest gathering of the party since the merger congress of the Communist Party and the Socialist Party in 1938. The congress, which confirmed the election of Pedro Castro as the new general secretary, marked the definitive end of the old "troika" leadership in the party. The troika had been formed in September 1944 as Vicente Lava was deposed as general secretary. The troika had consisted of Pedro Castro, Jorge Frianeza and Primitivo Arrogante.

At the congress the Pampanga delegation (including Luis Taruc) walked out in protest, in reaction to the opposition by the majority of the politburo to supporting the election candidacy of Amado M. Yuzon. The party leadership had stated, although Yuzon was the candidate of the Democratic Alliance in Pampanga, that the party could not support his candidacy as he had been a minor government employee during the Japanese occupation of the Philippines.
