= 2nd Congress =

2nd Congress may refer to:

- 2nd Congress of the Philippines (1949–1953)
- 2nd Congress of the Russian Social Democratic Labour Party (1903)
- 2nd Congress of the Workers' Party of North Korea (1948)
- 2nd National Congress of the Chinese Communist Party (1922)
- 2nd Congress of the Communist Party of India (1948)
- 2nd National Congress of the Kuomintang (1926)
- 2nd National Congress of the Lao People's Revolutionary Party (1972)
- 2nd National People's Congress (1959–1964)
- 2nd United States Congress (1791–1793)
- 2nd World Congress of the Comintern (1920)
- International Socialist Labor Congress of Brussels, 1891, the 2nd Congress of the Second International
- Lausanne Congress (1867), the 2nd Congress of the First International
- Second International Congress of the History of Science, London (1931)
