= Chao Tze-chi =

Chinese politician (1915–2020)

Chao Tzu-chi
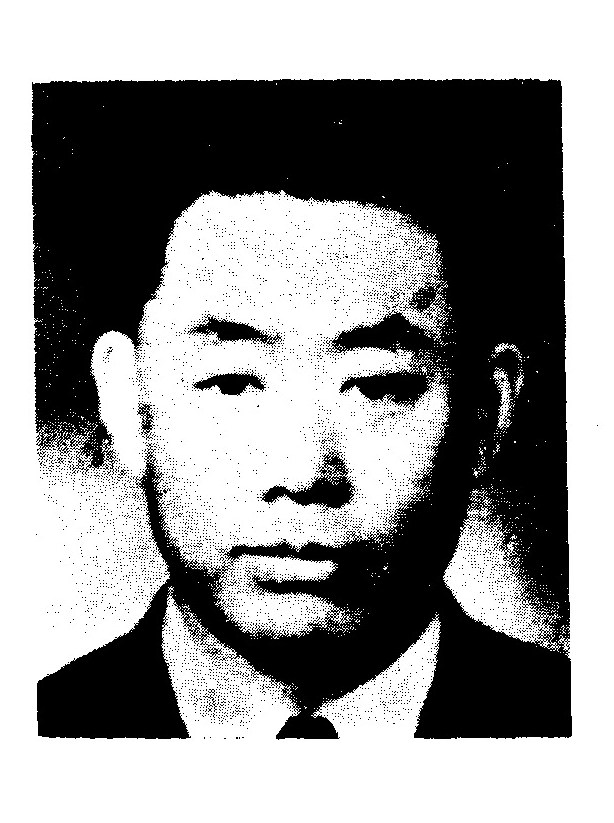
- Chao, late 1940s

3rd Chairman of World League for Freedom and Democracy
- In office 1989–1997
- Preceded by: Clement Chang
- Succeeded by: Yao Eng-chi

Members of the 1st Legislative Yuan
- In office 1948–1991
- Constituency: Rehe Province

Personal details
- Born: February 14, 1915 Rehe Province, Republic of China
- Died: August 4, 2020 (aged 105) Taiwan
- Party: Kuomintang
- Spouse: Cheng Chang-wei (m. 1942; died 2000)
- Children: 5
- Occupation: Politician

Chao Tzu-chi (Chinese: 趙自齊; pinyin: Zhào Zìqí; February 14, 1915 – August 4, 2020) was a Chinese politician, athlete and novelist. He was a member of the Tsotanhui Clique of the Kuomintang. He served as leader of the Kuomintang caucus in Legislative Yuan from 1970 to 1988 and Chairman of the World League for Freedom and Democracy from 1989 to 1997.

== Biography ==
Chao was born in Suidong, Rehe Province. He described his hometown as a desolate village surrounded by vast stretches of yellow sand, where more than half of the residents were Mongols. Chao himself could speak some Mongolian. Chao's father owned a silk shop, and his elder sister married the younger brother of the wife of Wu Peifu's elder brother.

In 1932, while studying at Nankai University, Chao participated in the student movement opposing the government's abandonment of Manchuria. As a representative of the movement, he traveled to Nanjing to protest against Chiang Kai-shek, which led to him being pursued by the police. In early 1933, Chao, along with other student representatives, voluntarily joined the Defense of the Great Wall after only three months of training. However, following several battles, he decided to return to his studies.

Chao was selected for the Jilin basketball team and the Rehe volleyball team in the 1933 National Games of the Republic of China, an event with anti-Japanese sentiment. Later that year, he attempted to return to Rehe, which had been incorporated into Manchukuo, disguised as a merchant. However, Japanese police identified him and, citing his participation in the Games, imprisoned him for five months as a suspected dissident. He later called this a turning point in his life.

After graduating from Nankai University, Chao was admitted to the Officer Training Corps in 1936, the deputy commander was Chen Cheng, while the class supervisor was Kang Tse. As a result, Chao was perceived as acknowledging his long-standing membership with this faction. During this period, he frequently participated in activities of the Blue Shirts Society, admiring its ideology without join it. This steadfast adherence led to his recognition as a hardliner within the Kuomintang.

Following the conclusion of the Xi'an Incident, he was entrusted with the personal protection of Chiang Kai-shek for a period of time.

Following the outbreak of the Second Sino-Japanese War in 1937, Chao served as a platoon leader under General Sun Yuanliang in the Battle of Shanghai. From 1937 to 1944, he was assigned to training duties. In 1944, alongside Wang Zhiyun, Li Yinguo, and Wang Shulin, he planned to organize a resistance movement in Rehe Province, which had been occupied by Manchukuo. However, on the eve of their departure, the mission was canceled as an Allied victory appeared imminent, and Chao was recalled.

After the surrender of Japan, Chao returned to his hometown in Rehe Province to oversee the post-war administrative takeover. He claimed that while the local population trusted the Kuomintang, the Chinese Communist Party assassinated those who followed Kuomintang directives at night, making the takeover increasingly difficult. In 1948, he was elected as a legislator representing the Rehe constituency.

In 1964, Chao visited the United States and other 11 European countries, where he toured the U.S. House of Representatives and Chinatown in Hawaii. Upon returning to Taiwan, he published a spy novel titled Crossing the Baltic Sea. Chao also authored several other works, including The Problem of Refugee Resettlement after the Recovery of the Mainland, America, Hesitate No More, and Six Hours in East Berlin.

From 1970 to 1988, Chao served as the Secretary-General of the Central Policy Committee.The committee was responsible for overseeing the operations of party caucuses, leading policy discussions, and formulating key party policies, effectively serving as the party's whip. His tenure was marked by controversy due to his decision to deploy the Taiwan Garrison Command to investigate newspaper agencies and his own deputy, Liang Su-yung. Pro-democracy dissident Cheng Nan-jung even claimed that Chao was the "President of the Legislative Yuan behind the scenes".

In the 1988 Legislative Yuan presidential election, Chao, as military-backed hardliner, was originally chosen by Liu Kuo-tsai as his running mate . Since Liu planned to retire in two years, his vice president would have been positioned to assume the presidency of the Legislative Yuan in 1990. However, with the intervention of President Lee Teng-hui, human rights lawyer Liang Su-yung, a member of the CC Clique, secured the nomination instead.

Chao's replacement was not solely due to Lee's preference. According to contemporaneous reports, Ma Shu-li, chairman of the Broadcasting Corporation of China, and other influential figures advocated for Chao to bypass Liu and directly run for Legislative Yuan president in 1988. Chao's ambiguous stance toward this suggestion created a rift between him and Liu. Around the same time, an anonymous letter surfaced accusing Liang of having collaborated with the Japanese during World War II. Liang publicly claimed that Chao was behind the smear campaign, further deepening the political divide. These developments paved the way for Lee Teng-hui to successfully maneuver the nomination in Liang's favor. Chao had a very antagonistic relationship with Liang, and in his memoirs, Chao referred to Liang as ungrateful and a spreader of rumors.

In 1990, after Chao took over the World League for Freedom and Democracy, he changed its name from the original "World League for Anti-Communist" to "World League for Freedom and Democracy." This move was strongly opposed by its founder, Ku Cheng-kang, who denounced Chao as reckless and audacious.

Chao shifted the league's mission from "anti-communism" to the "promotion of freedom and democracy", transforming its approach from mass movements to an academic focus. He collaborated with the Claremont Institute to organize an exhibition on the new world order after the Gulf War. Additionally, Chao was invited by the United Nations to participate as an observer in the Fourth Review Conference of the Treaty on the Non-Proliferation of Nuclear Weapons.

In 1992, Chao made a high-profile visit to India to meet with the 14th Dalai Lama, marking the first contact between representatives of Taiwan and the Central Tibetan Administration since the ROC's retreat to Taiwan.

In 1994, Chao was invited by Russian president Boris Yeltsin to hold a conference of the World League for Freedom and Democracy in Moscow. During the event, Chao was invited to give a speech at the Kremlin.

In 2015, Chao established the Chao Tzu-chi Education Foundation, which provides scholarships to students of Rehe Province origin.

Chao died on 4 August 2020 at the age of 105. On 23 September, President Tsai Ing-wen issued Presidential Decree No. 1472 in commemoration of Chao. The contents of the decree are as follows:

"Former presidential advisor and former legislator Chao Tzu-chi, loyal, sincere, and diligent in his service. He graduated from Tianjin Nankai University at a young age, and with a deep sense of patriotism, he joined the Central Military Academy and excelled in both academic and military matters. He gained early fame for his contributions. During the War of Resistance against Japan, he participated in the Battle of Shanghai and the organization and development of resistance efforts in occupied areas, facing great hardship without hesitation. Later, after the government relocated to Taiwan, he served in the Legislative Yuan, mediating and facilitating compromises, reviewing central government budgets, and promoting the implementation of policy and important laws. He also contributed to the advancement of world democracy and freedom as the President of the World League for Freedom and Democracy, helping to establish communication channels, promote Taiwan's diplomatic relations, and share Taiwan's success story. His leadership became a strong force for Taiwan’s international presence, and he was awarded the Second Class Order of Propitious Clouds. Additionally, Chao established the Chao Tzu-chi Educational Foundation to support underprivileged youth and to promote humanitarian and public welfare. His life's work has been widely respected and admired. His passing is deeply mourned, and this decree is issued as a token of the government’s profound respect for his lifelong contributions to the nation."

President: Tsai Ing-wen

Premier: Su Tseng-chang

23 September 2020

== Political views ==
=== On Mongolian Autonomy ===
According to The Reminiscence of Dr. Chao Tze-chi (趙自齊先生訪談錄), published by the Academia Historica in 2000, Chao articulated strong positions on Mongolian autonomy and played an active role in legislative debates on frontier governance during the early 1950s. He provided a detailed account of the controversy within the Legislative Yuan concerning the legal status of Mongolian self-government, outlining both the institutional process and his own intervention in policy discussions.

Chao recalled that on 16 March 1951, during the thirteenth session of the Legislative Yuan, a Statutory Revision Committee was established to compile a catalogue of existing laws. Debate over Mongolian autonomy soon generated heightened tensions between Mongol and Han representatives. The committee determined that laws should be repealed or amended under nine specified conditions, and after more than fifty committee meetings, nine plenary sessions, and six administrative reports to the Legislative Yuan, a consultative conference was convened on 26 March 1953 with representatives from the Presidential Office and the five branches of government. Chao argued that by April–May 1954 the five statutes formulated for frontier affairs were already sufficiently sound.

However, on 20 November of that year, the newly appointed chairman of the Mongolian and Tibetan Affairs Commission, Liu Lien-ke, unexpectedly proposed incorporating several guiding principles—regarded by Liu as the supreme basis of Mongolian autonomy—directly into statutory law. Chao interpreted this initiative as inflaming ethnic antagonism and questioned the abrupt policy reversal:

Were the regulations that Chairman Tien Chung-chin had earlier argued should not be included truly omitted because of oversight—because Chairman Tien had been negligent beforehand and the Legislative Yuan inattentive afterward—such that his successor, Chairman Liu, now deemed them indispensable? The facts were by no means so. Acting out of prudence, Chairman Tien had already conducted extensive consultations with the majority of legislators and approached the matter with the utmost conscientiousness; he was certainly not guided by prejudice.

Chao contended that the so-called “Eight Principles of Mongolian Autonomy,” advocated by Liu, included provisions such as establishing a Mongolian Local Self-Government Political Council directly subordinate to the Executive Yuan and headed by Mongols, maintaining the existing banner-and-league administrative structure, and preserving existing jurisdictional authority. He argued that these proposals ultimately derived from Japanese wartime strategy: after failing to incorporate Mongolia into Manchukuo, Japanese agents—particularly Kenji Doihara—had courted Mongol aristocrats and encouraged what he described as “Greater Mongolian chauvinism,” producing what he characterized as a fictitious puppet autonomy associated with figures such as Demchugdongrub and Li Shouxin. On this basis, Chao labeled Liu's proposal a “bill of national humiliation.”

Chao further asserted that the “reality of Mongolian autonomy” consisted of attempts to institutionalize the alleged “national humiliation bill,” preserve the banner system, and restrict Han settlement, which he interpreted as unilateral efforts to secure legislative advantages. Drawing upon his upbringing in a village with a Mongol majority, he argued that frontier provinces had historically experienced long-standing interethnic coexistence:

For centuries the various ethnic groups have lived intermixed; the Han and minority peoples have consistently coexisted in peace and intimacy. Yet after the Mukden Incident, Japan conspired to divide our peoples and destroy our nation, inciting Demchugdongrub in order to rally disorderly sentiment. Coupled with the central government’s lack of clarity, its readiness to heed rumors, and its inclination toward expedient compromise, this created the pretext for Mongolian autonomy. The treachery of Demchugdongrub was later leveraged upon the foundations laid at Bailingmiao, and after victory the Chinese Communists exploited the situation to provoke ethnic discord, enabling a small number of ambitious elements among our Mongol compatriots to pressure the central authorities amid internal and external crises for their private ends.

He also criticized Mongolian autonomists for allegedly falsifying demographic data in an attempt to overturn what he regarded as the historically shared character of Mongolian lands between Han and Mongol populations, as well as, what he perceived as preferential treatment toward frontier minorities, citing the distribution of relief supplies under Minister of Social Affairs Ku Cheng-kang, which he believed unintentionally fostered division.

In a memorandum submitted to the central government, Chao set forth his own position on the banner-and-league system:

In a democratic state practicing the Three Principles of the People, the populace should enjoy the four fundamental freedoms—residence, belief, speech, and publication—as well as the basic rights of national independence, political democracy, and economic equality. All ethnic groups within the country ought to trust one another, render mutual assistance, and work in concert to achieve unity. China’s existing frontiers must maintain territorial integrity without condition. A modern state can accommodate multiple ethnicities; so long as they have dwelt for generations upon the nation’s soil, all are citizens of the Republic of China, and the government must naturally extend protection and fair treatment. Accordingly, every ethnic group owes loyalty to the state. Should any minority seek to secede and demand independence, such an act must be treated as treason and cannot be tolerated; those who encourage it should be regarded as acting in the least friendly manner and immediately restrained. We must make unmistakably clear what constitutes the government’s ultimate limits—once these are exceeded, the severest sanctions are required. Only through sincerity toward one another can coexistence and shared prosperity be achieved; only unity can prevent China from being invaded, and only thus can all enjoy the guarantees of security.

He further proposed a set of governing principles for Mongolia that were ultimately accepted by the central authorities after rejecting a competing platform advanced by Mongolian Politician, Wu Heling. :

1. All personnel dispatched by the central government to the frontier regions must possess an understanding of those regions and serve with a missionary spirit. In their daily lives, they must integrate closely with the frontier populations, so that unity is founded upon psychological identification.
2. Complete equality among all ethnic groups must be achieved. In legal, economic, and social terms, no discrimination in rights shall be permitted; however, obligations must likewise not be evaded.
3. Languages, cultures, and religious beliefs, provided that they do not undermine national unity, should be coordinated in order to pursue equality among ethnic groups.
4. Mongolian intellectuals and youth should be appointed and employed according to their abilities.
5. The appointment and examination of administrative officials must not be divided along ethnic lines and must be conducted with absolute fairness.
6. Frontier regions should develop transportation with railways as the primary mode, supplemented by air transport and highways. At a minimum, frontier railways should include at least three routes: one from Baotou to Lanzhou connecting with the Longhai Railway; one from Zhangjiakou through Duolun to Hulunbuir; and an extension of the Yunnan–Burma Railway into Burma to reach an Indian Ocean outlet.
7. Frontier welfare programs should aim to raise the living standards of Mongolian compatriots. Domestic resources and active assistance from the United Nations should be fully utilized to improve livestock breeds, reduce epizootic diseases, and establish wool textile and leather factories, enabling exchange with other regions for productive goods. Modern medicine should be introduced to prevent illness and death. Education should not be confined to traditional forms, but should emphasize mobility, so that men and women of all ages have opportunities to understand national and international conditions.
8. After the recovery of the mainland, governance must not rely solely on subjective judgments. Frontier inspection and research delegations must be organized and dispatched in groups to various regions for investigation, in order to avoid disputes arising from imagination or from reliance on the one-sided views of a small number of individuals. — Chao Tze-chi, 1955

Chao recalled that his role and policy stance prompted a protest on 26 October, when a total of sixty-five Mongolian political figures gathered at the Guangfu Hall of Zhongshan Hall to denounce him as the principal instigator and petition the central government for disciplinary action. Although Chiang Kai-shek expressed support for Chao, many of his Mongolian friends subsequently severed relations with him. Chao wrote:

“With regard to the sacred principles of the Constitution, I could not but abide by them. While my position may have failed to satisfy the designs of a minority, it was by no means grounded in prejudice. A self-drafted bill, by its very nature, did not meet the criteria for statutory incorporation; its exclusion was therefore entirely proper. That some legislators used this matter as a pretext for nonparticipation was plainly inappropriate, and the demand that the ‘culprit’ be punished was an especially regrettable exaggeration.”

== Controversy ==
In the Legislative Yuan Gazette, critics claimed that as WACL chairman, he occupied a disproportionately large office space of 150 ping within a 1,000-ping facility, and was accused of using public funds for family and friends' travel.
