= Clement Chang =

Taiwanese academic and politician (1929–2018)

- 張建邦

Minister of Transportation and Communications of the Republic of China
- In office 1 June 1989 – 24 April 1991
- Preceded by: Kuo Nan-hong
- Succeeded by: Ma Cheng-fang (acting); Eugene Chien

2nd Chairman of World League for Freedom and Democracy
- In office 1988–1989
- Preceded by: Ku Cheng-kang
- Succeeded by: Chao Tzu-chi

Speaker of the Taipei City Council
- In office 25 December 1981 – 1 June 1989
- Preceded by: Lin Ting-sheng
- Succeeded by: Chen Chien-chih

Deputy Speaker of the Taipei City Council
- In office 25 December 1969 – 25 December 1981
- Preceded by: Chen Shao-hui
- Succeeded by: Chen Chien-chih

President of Tamkang University
- In office 1 August 1964 – 31 July 1986

Personal details
- Born: 15 March 1929 Taihoku Prefecture, Japanese Taiwan (today Yilan County, Taiwan)
- Died: 26 May 2018 (aged 89) Zhongzheng District, Taipei, Taiwan
- Party: Kuomintang
- Education: St. John's University, Shanghai (BS); University of Illinois (MS, PhD)
- Occupation: Politician; educator

Clement Chang Chien-Pang (Chinese: 張建邦; pinyin: Zhāng Jiànbāng; Wade–Giles: Chang Chien-pang; 15 March 1929 – 26 May 2018) was a Taiwanese academic and politician. He was president of Tamkang University from 1964 to 1986, stepping down to serve three years as the chairman of the institution's board of trustees.

After graduating from St. John's University, Shanghai, Chang earned a Master of Science (M.S.) in 1952 and his Ph.D. in education in 1981, both from the University of Illinois. His doctoral dissertation was titled, "A Study of Bureaucratic, Collegial and Political Models of Governance in Six Universities in Taiwan".

Chang won his first election to the Taipei City Council in 1969, and served as deputy speaker for three terms until 1981, when he was named speaker. In 1989, Chang was appointed to the Executive Yuan as Minister of Transportation and Communications, and was succeeded by Eugene Chien in 1991. Chang was a founding editor of the Journal of Futures Studies from November 1996 until his death at National Taiwan University Hospital on 26 May 2018, aged 89.
