= 8th National Congress of the Kuomintang =

The 8th National Congress of the Kuomintang (Chinese: 中國國民黨第八次全國代表大会) was the eight national congress of the Kuomintang, held on 10–23 October 1957 at Taipei, Taiwan.

== Results ==
During the congress, Chen Cheng was elected as Chiang Kai-shek's deputy, as the Deputy Director-General of the Kuomintang.

== See also ==
- Kuomintang
