= Shen Shih-hsiung =

Shen Shih-hsiung (Chinese: 沈世雄; born 29 April 1936) is a Taiwanese politician.

Shen earned a degree in law from Soochow University. After serving three terms on the Nantou County Council, Shen was a member of the Legislative Yuan from 1981 to 1993, and was deputy speaker of the body from 1992 to 1993.
