= 3rd National Congress of the Kuomintang =

The 3rd National Congress of the Kuomintang (Chinese: 中國國民黨第三次全國代表大会) was the third national congress of the Kuomintang, held on 15–28 March 1929 at Nanking, Republic of China. This was the first KMT national congress after the Chinese reunification in 1928 after the northern expedition, thus it was located in the unified ROC capital Nanking.

== Results ==
The congress adopted the Program for a Phase of Political Tutelage.

== See also ==
- Kuomintang
