= 4th National Congress of the Kuomintang =

The 4th National Congress of the Kuomintang (Chinese: 中國國民黨第四次全國代表大会) was the fourth national congress of the Kuomintang, held on 12–23 November 1931 at Nanking, Republic of China.

== Results ==
Motions were passed in the congress to organize a conference on national calamities and set up measures to present united resistance against aggression.

== See also ==
- Kuomintang
