= 16th National Congress of the Kuomintang =

The 16th National Congress of the Kuomintang (Chinese: 中國國民黨第十六次全國代表大会) was the sixteenth national congress of the Kuomintang, held on 29–30 July 2001 in Taipei, Taiwan.

== See also ==
- Kuomintang
