= 7th National Congress of the Kuomintang =

The 7th National Congress of the Kuomintang (Chinese: 中國國民黨第七次全國代表大会) was the seventh national congress of the Kuomintang (KMT), held on 10–20 October 1952 at Taipei, Taiwan. This was the first KMT National Congress in Taiwan, formerly a Japanese territory until 1952, after KMT lost mainland China to the Chinese Communist Party in the Chinese Civil War.

== Results ==
The congress announced the completion of the 2 years party reform.

== See also ==
- Kuomintang
