= 1st National Congress of the Kuomintang =

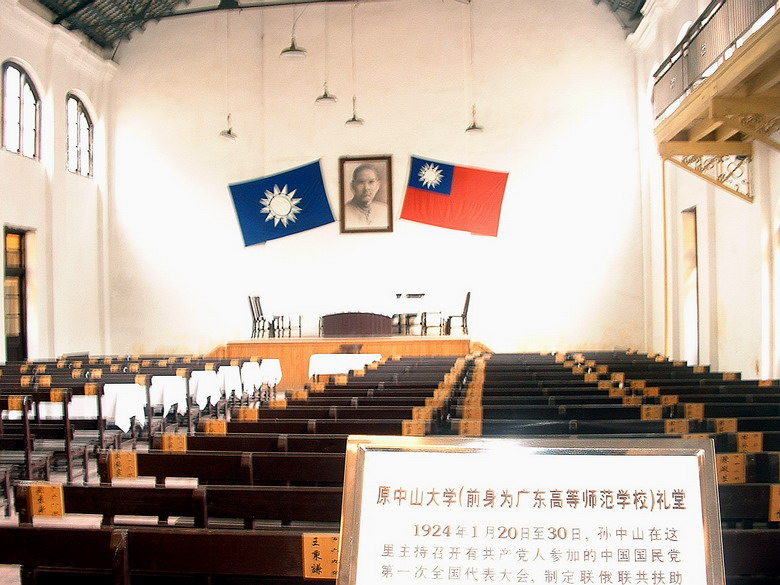
Venue for the 1st National Congress of Kuomintang

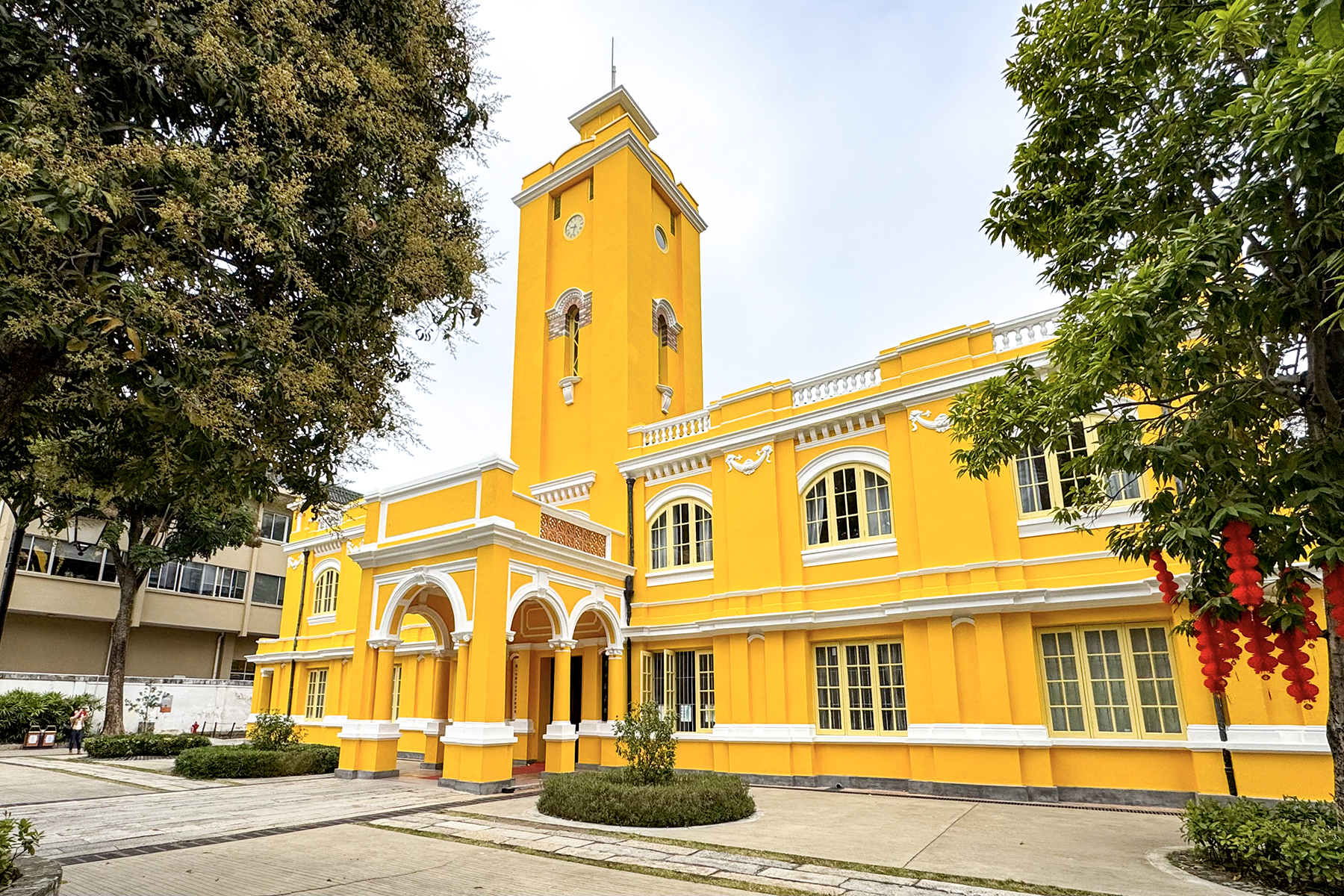
Building venue exterior

The 1st National Congress of the Kuomintang (Chinese: 中國國民黨第一次全國代表大會) was the first national congress of the Kuomintang, held on 20–30 January 1924 at Guangzhou, Guangdong, Republic of China.

== Results ==
During this first congress, the Kuomintang's reorganization process to become the Kuomintang of China (中國國民黨) in 1919 from the previous Chinese Revolutionary Party was formally completed. A policy declaration was also drafted to fight against imperialism and feudalism, determining three policies of alliance with Soviet Union and alliance with the Chinese Communist Party in the First United Front. This first congress eventually led to the reunification of China four years later after the Northern Expedition.

As time progressed, the Chinese Kuomintang (KMT) lost its grip on China and after its defeat in mainland China, the party retreated to Taiwan. From 1950 to 1952, the KMT underwent a thorough organizational restructuring. The result was a renewal of its Leninist origins from the previous reorganization in 1924. This came from the help of the Kuomintang Central Reform Committee. The Kuomintang Committee created a variety of direct or indirect controls over the government and society that gave it unquestioned dominance. This eventually led to the party interacting closely with the people on Taiwan as a result of the party recruitment and the implementation of local-level political reforms, two salient agendas that had never taken place in the mainland.
