= 20th National Congress of the Kuomintang =

2007-2020 political congress in Taiwan

The 20th National Congress of the Kuomintang (Chinese: 中國國民黨第二十次全國代表大会) were a series of four congresses of the 20th national congress of the Kuomintang in 2017–2020

== History ==
=== 2017 ===
The first congress was held on 20 August 2017 in Taichung, Taiwan.

=== 2018 ===
The second congress was held in 2018 with a baseball theme.

=== 2020 ===
The fourth congress was held on 6 September 2020 at Sun Yat-sen Memorial Hall in Xinyi District, Taipei. The party reaffirmed its commitment to the Constitution of the Republic of China and the 1992 Consensus.

== See also ==
- Kuomintang
