= Lian (surname) =

Lian/Lien (連/连), (廉) is a Chinese surname.

== Origin ==
=== 連 ===
The Chinese Lian (連) family originated from the Gaoxin (高辛) family, Lianao (連敖) of Chu (state), and the Jiang (姜) family of Qi (state). Also, it was founded from various public offices of the Zhou dynasty period and the public offices of the Han dynasty period. Later, another Lian (連) family was founded from the Xiongnu people, the Xianbei people, and the Manchu people.

=== 廉 ===
The Chinese Lian (廉) family originated from the Xiong family of the Chu (state) and the Buddhist Turpan Uyghurs like Lian Xixian. It is also said that the Lian family descended from the Yellow Emperor. It is the 66th name on the Hundred Family Surnames poem.

== Notable people ==
=== 練 ===
- Denis Lian (練建勝; born 1972), Singaporean race car driver
- Lian Junjie (练俊杰; born 2000), Chinese diver

=== 連 ===
- Lian Heng (連橫; 1878–1936), Chinese historian, father of Lien Chen-tung
- Heah Joo Seang (连裕祥; 1899-1962), Malayan politician, business leader, rubber magnate, philanthropist
- Lien Chen-tung, (連震東; 1904-1986) former Republic of China Minister of the Interior, father of Lien Chan
- Lien Ying Chow (连瀛洲; 1906-2004), Singaporean businessman
- Heah Hock Aun (連福安; 1932-2014), Malaysian badminton player
- Lien Chan (連戰; born 1936), former Vice President of the Republic of China (Taiwan)
- Liang Eng Hwa (连荣华; born 1964), Singaporean politician
- Arlene Lien (連惠心; born 1967), Taiwanese professor and daughter of Lien Chan
- Andrew Lin Hoi (連凱; born 1969), Hong Kong–based Taiwanese actor and visual artist
- Sean Lien (連勝文; born 1970), Taiwanese lawyer
- Michele Lean (连仪温; born 1982), Malaysian television presenter, writer, and actress
- Sarah Lian (连丽婷; born 1983), Malaysian Chinese actress
- Shiga Lin (连诗雅; born 1988), Hong Kong singer and actress
- Simon Lian (連晨翔; born 1992), Taiwanese actor and singer
- Lian Xiao (连笑; born 1994), Chinese professional Go player

=== 廉 ===
- Lian Po (廉頗; 3rd century BC), Zhao State general during the Warring States period
- Lian Yimin (廉毅敏; born 1964), Chinese politician

=== Unknown ===
- Daniel Lian, Singaporean economist
