= 9th Congress =

9th Congress may refer to:

- 9th Congress of Colombia (2022–2026)
- 9th Congress of the Philippines (1992–1995)
- 9th Congress of the Russian Communist Party (Bolsheviks) (1920)
- 9th Congress of the Sammarinese Communist Party (1976)
- 9th National Congress of the Chinese Communist Party (1969)
- 9th National Congress of the Communist Party of Vietnam (2001)
- 9th National Congress of the Kuomintang (1963)
- 9th National Congress of the Lao People's Revolutionary Party (2011)
- 9th National People's Congress (1998–2003)
- 9th United States Congress (1805–1807)
