= Shih Shih-chi =

Shih Shih-chi (Chinese: 施士洁; 1853–1922), original name Ying Chia (應嘉), courtesy name Yün Fang (澐舫), art name Yün K'uang (芸況) or Chê Yüan (喆園), was a Hoklo Taiwanese. He and his father, Shih Ch'iung-fang (施瓊芳), were the only father-son jinshi (presented scholars) of the Qing Dynasty in Taiwan. He was a rare literary talent in Taiwan's modern literary scene, excelling in poetry, lyrics, and prose. Since Shih shared the same birthdate as the Song Dynasty literatus Su Shi (蘇東坡), he often compared himself to Su Shi, even naming his poem collection as A Shrine After Su (後蘇龕). Huang Tien-Ch'üan, a literary and history scholar, compiled A Collection of Shrines After Su (後蘇龕合集) based on his manuscripts.

== Activities ==
Shih also served as a principal at the Baisha Academy in Changhua and Chungwen the Literary College in Tainan. In the 13th year of Guangxu's reign (1887), he was invited by Tang Ching-sung of Taiwan Circuit to teach at the Haidong Academy in Taiwanfu. His students—Hsün Nan-Ying (許南英) and Wang Ch'un-Yüan (汪春源) both became jinshi, and other students—Qiu Fengjia and Chêng P'êng-yün (鄭鵬雲) gained prominence in literature, as well. In the 17th year of Guangxu's reign, he served as a staff member for Tang Ching-Sung. When Taiwan was ceded to Japan in 1895, Shih returned to his hometown Hsi-ts'ên, Chin Chiang Town, Kuangchou city, and worked at the Amoy Commercial and Political Bureau. In the 3rd year of Xuantong's reign (1911), he became the head of Maxiang Town in Tong'an County.

Shih was a member of several literary societies in Taiwan, including the Chungjeng Society (崇正社), Feiting Poetry Society (斐亭吟社), and Peony Poetry Society (牡丹吟社). After moving to mainland China, he joined the Shuzhuang Poetry Society (菽莊吟社).

The Taiwanese literatus Lien Heng once commented on Shih, "Since the Kuanghsü era, Taiwan's poetry world has praised Shih Yun-Fang (courtesy name of Shih Shih-chi) and Ch'iu Hsien-kên as two distinguished scholars."
