= Manao Temple =

Buddhist temple in Hangzhou, China

- 玛瑙寺
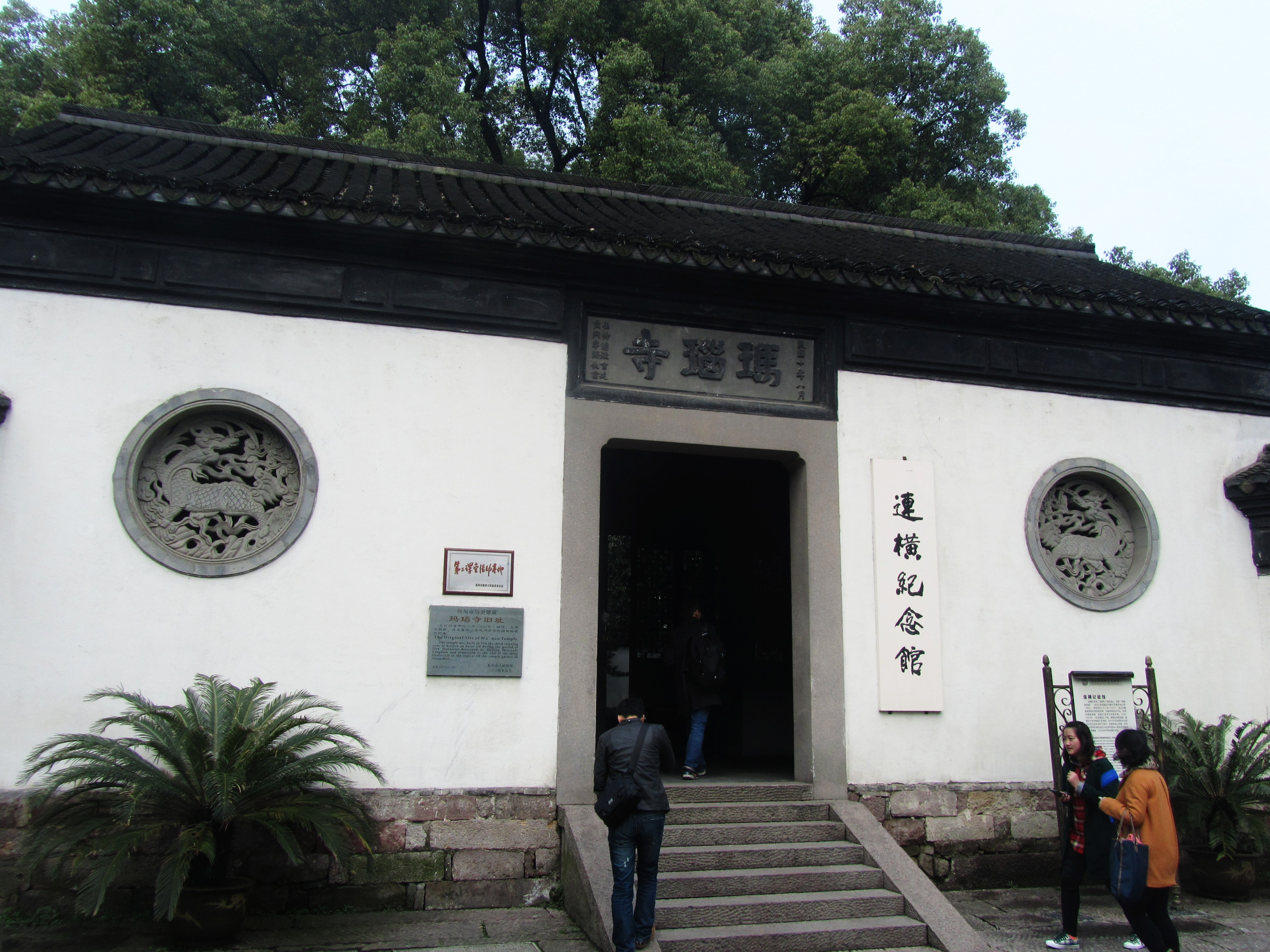
- The Shanmen of Manao Temple.

- Location within Zhejiang

Religion
- Affiliation: Buddhism
- Deity: Chan Buddhism

Location
- Location: Xihu District, Hangzhou, Zhejiang
- Country: China
- Coordinates: 30°15′49″N 120°09′04″E

Architecture
- Style: Chinese architecture
- Established: 1152
- Completed: 1921

Manao Temple (simplified Chinese: 玛瑙寺; traditional Chinese: 瑪瑙寺; pinyin: Mǎnǎo Sì; lit. 'Temple of Agate') is a former Buddhist temple located in Xihu District of Hangzhou, Zhejiang.

== History ==
Manao Temple was first established in 946, during the Later Jin dynasty (936–947). In 1065, it was officially called "Manao Temple". It was named for its location in the Manao Slope (Chinese: 玛瑙坡). In 1152, in the Southern Song dynasty (1127–1279), the temple relocated to the current location. During the region of Qianlong Emperor (1736–1795) of the Qing dynasty (1644–1911), he visited the temple three times. Manao Temple was restored in the Tongzhi period (1862–1874).

In 1926-27, Taiwanese historian Lian Heng lived here. In December 2008, it was used as the Lian Heng Memorial Museum. It is no longer used as a religious building.

== Architecture ==
The present temple was completed in 1921 by abbot Qingjie (Chinese: 清杰). Along the central axis of the temple stand three buildings including the Shanmen, Mahavira Hall and Rear Hall. Subsidiary structures were built on both sides of the central axis including wing-room, dining room and bedroom.

== Gallery ==
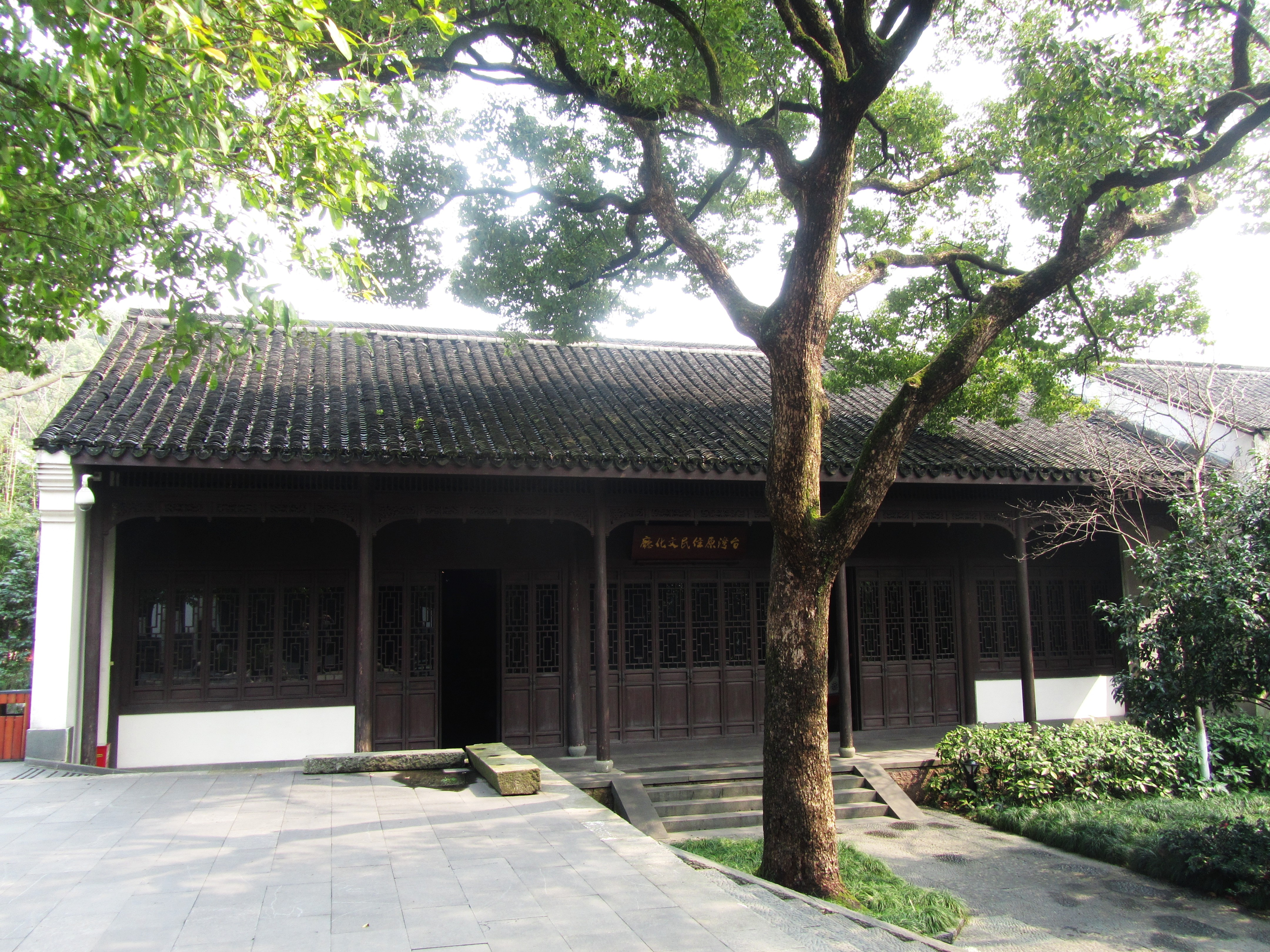
Wing-room.

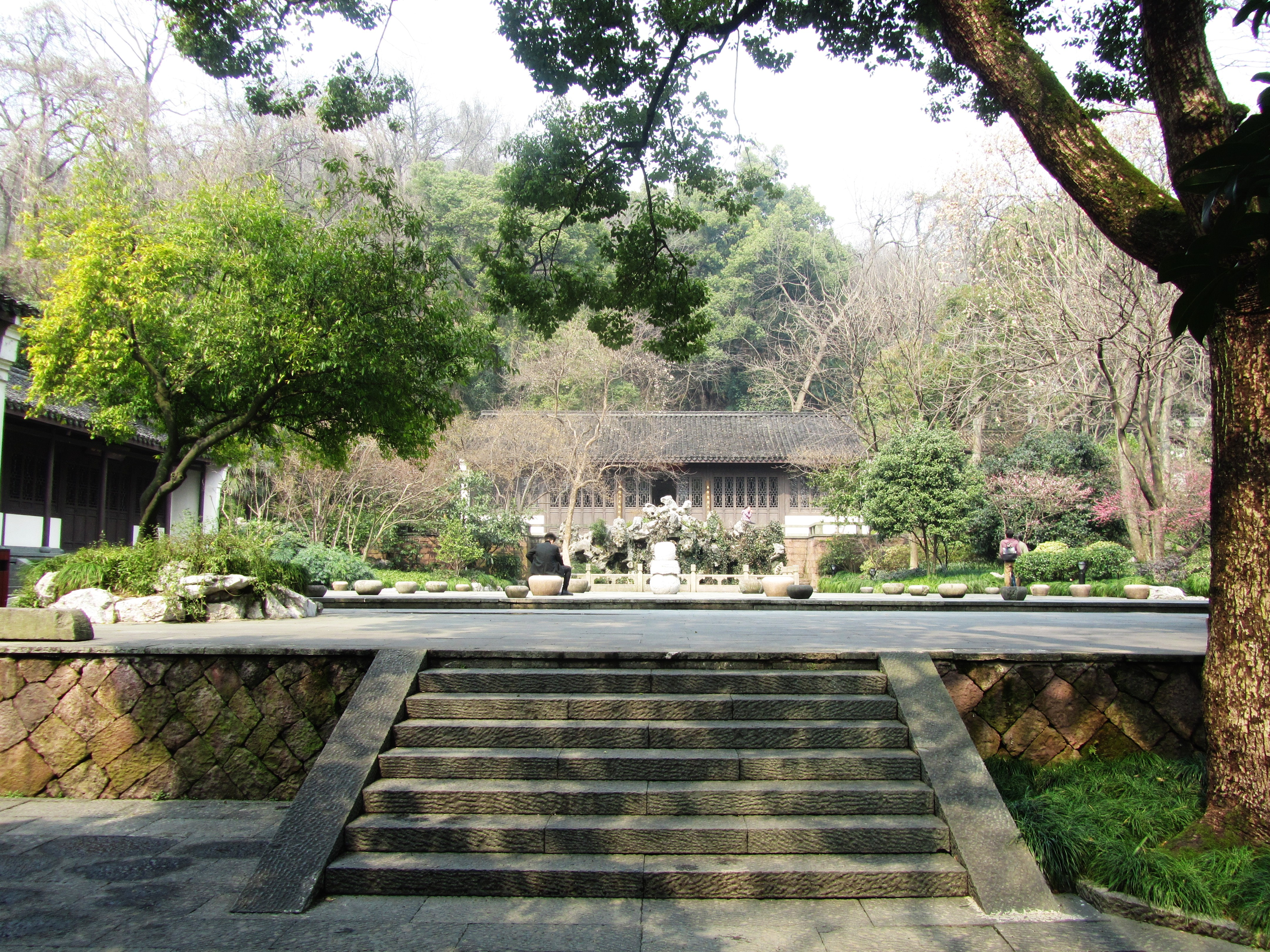
Site of the Mahavira Hall.

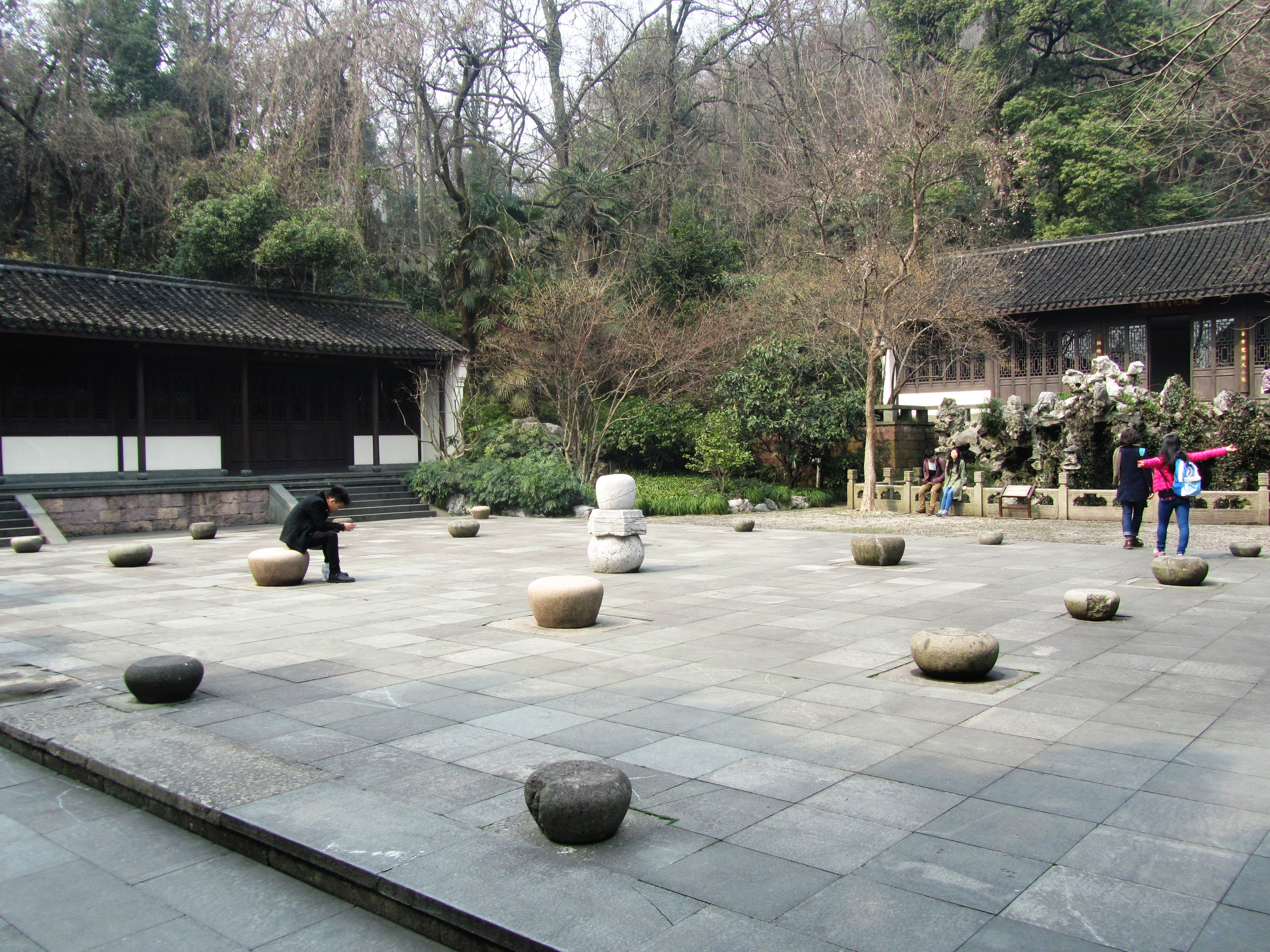
Site of the Mahavira Hall.
