= Sean Lien =

Taiwanese lawyer

Lien Sheng-wen
- 連勝文
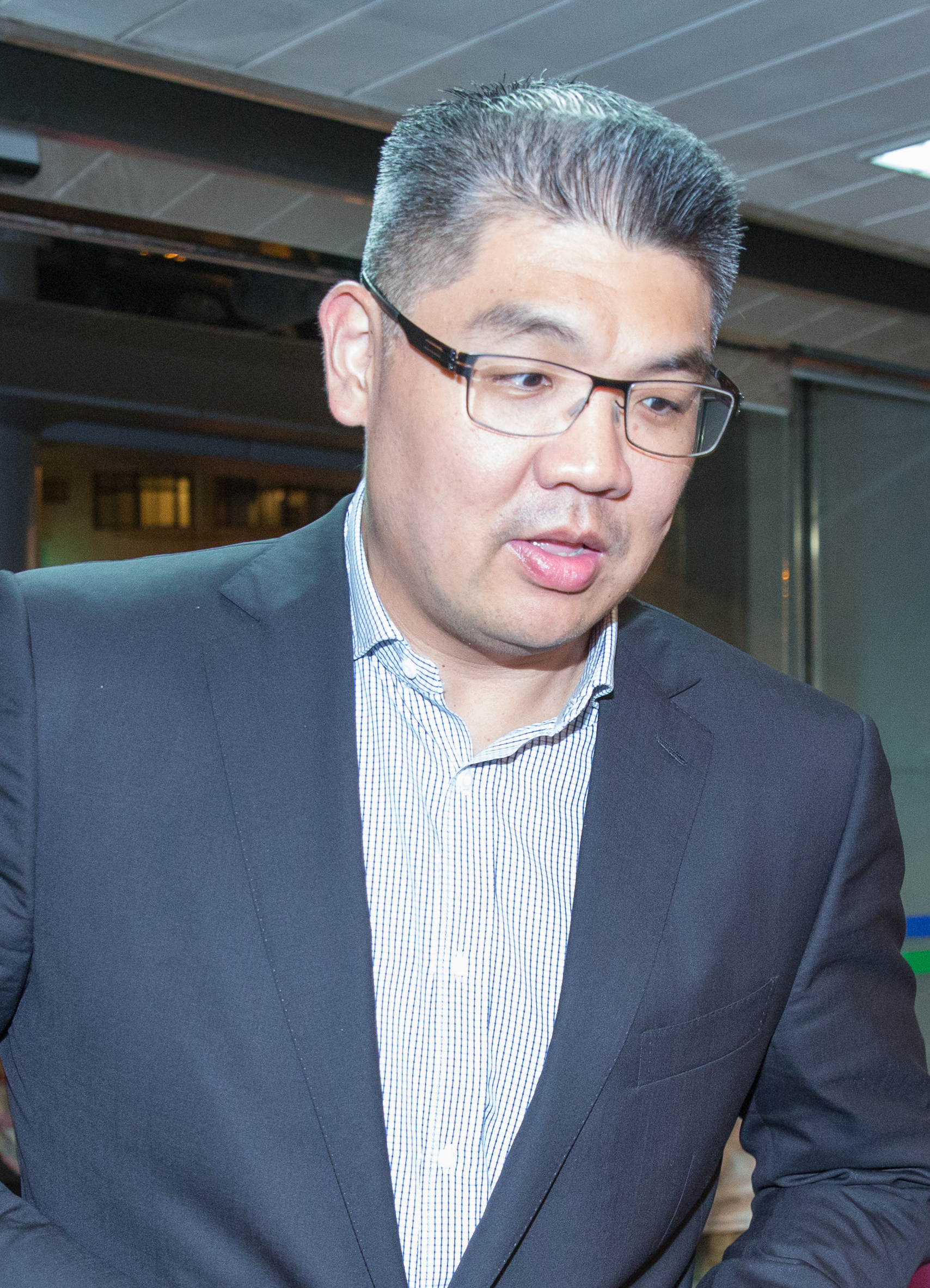
- Lien in 2014

Vice Chairman of the Kuomintang
- In office October 30, 2021 – November 1, 2025 Serving with Huang Min-hui and Andrew Hsia
- Chairman: Eric Chu

Member of the Central Committee of the Kuomintang
- Incumbent
- Assumed office September 2005

Personal details
- Born: February 3, 1970 (age 56) Taipei, Taiwan
- Party: Kuomintang
- Relations: Lien Chan (father); Fang Yu (mother); Lien Chen-tung (grandfather); Lian Heng (great-grandfather); Arlene Lien (sister)
- Education: Fu Jen Catholic University (LLB); Columbia University (LLM, JD)

Chinese name
- Traditional Chinese: 連勝文
- Simplified Chinese: 连胜文
Transcriptions
Standard Mandarin
- Hanyu Pinyin: Lián Shèngwén
Southern Min
- Hokkien POJ: Liân Sèng-bûn

Lien Sheng-wen (Chinese: 連勝文; Pe̍h-ōe-jī: Liân Sèng-bûn; born February 3, 1970), also known by his English name Sean Lien, is a Taiwanese lawyer who was vice chairman of the Kuomintang from 2021 to 2025. He is co-founder of Evenstar Capital and previously served as chairman of the Taipei Smart Card Corporation, the company which operates EasyCard.

== Early life and education ==
According to some sources, Lien was born in the United States of America; others indicate that he was born in Taiwan. He is the eldest son of Lien Fang Yu and Lien Chan, who served as the Chairman of the Kuomintang party and was the Vice President of Taiwan. He is the grandson of Lien Chen-tung, and the great-grandson of Lien Heng. He has a brother and two sisters. He is married to Patty Tsai.

Lien graduated from Fu Jen Catholic University in with a Bachelor of Laws (LL.B.) in 1992, then completed advanced studies in the United States at Columbia University in New York City. He was awarded an Eisenhower Fellowship and earned a Master of Laws (LL.M.) and a Juris Doctor (J.D.) from Columbia Law School. While at Columbia, Lien was classmates with Hsiao Bi-khim.

== Early career ==
Lien served in a senior management position at GE's Asia Pacific Capital Fund II and as a vice president with an Investment Banking Group in Taipei. He is co-founder and senior advisor to the Hong Kong investment company Evenstar Capital.

== Political career ==
In 2008, Taipei City Mayor Hau Lung-pin appointed Lien as chairman of Taipei Smart Card Corporation. Lien resigned as Chairman of EasyCard Corporation at the end of 2009, citing health reasons. Assessments of his performance during this brief tenure differ.

During the municipal election on 26 November 2010, Lien was shot in the face at close range while stumping for Chen Hung-yuan, a New Taipei City Council candidate in the Yonghe District of New Taipei City. Lien's wound was minor and he recovered quickly. Lien disagrees with Taiwan judiciary's conclusion that he was shot by mistake.

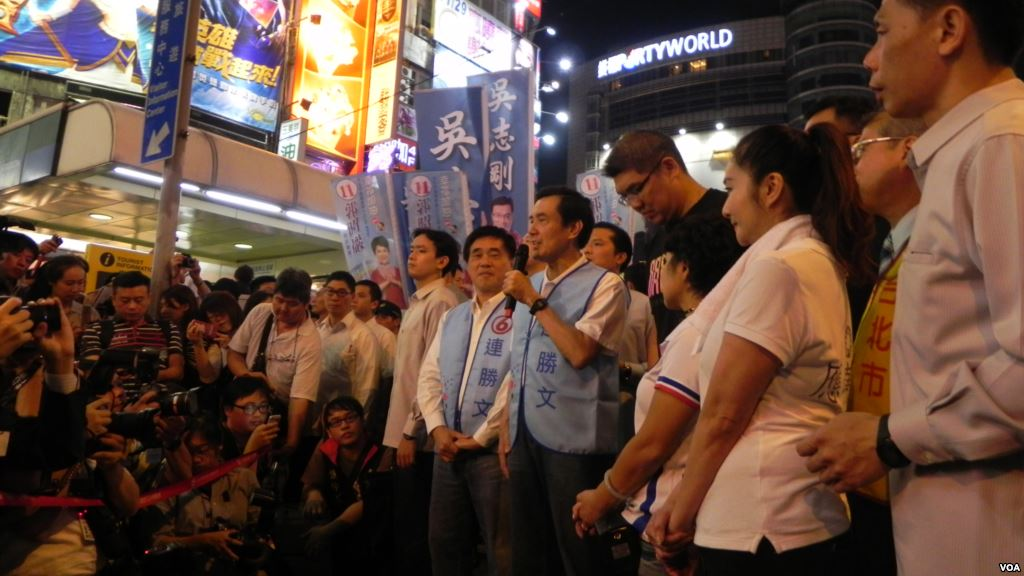
KMT Chairman Ma Ying-jeou endorsing Sean Lien for Taipei Mayor in 2014 ROC local election.

On February 24, 2014, Lien announced his campaign for Taipei City mayor election; on April 19, 2014, he won the KMT mayoral primary. On November 29, Lien lost the race to independent candidate Ko Wen-je.

2014 Taipei City Mayoralty Election Result
No.	Candidate	Party	Votes	Percentage
1	Chen Ju-pin (陳汝斌)	Self Help Party	1,624	0.11%
2	Chao Yen-ching (趙衍慶)	Independent	15,898	1.06%
3	Lee Hong-hsin (李宏信)	Independent	2,621	0.18%
4	Yong C. Chen (陳永昌)	Independent	1,908	0.13%
5	Neil Peng	Independent	8,080	0.54%
6	Sean Lien	KMT	609,932	40.82%
7	Ko Wen-je	Independent	853,983	57.16%

== See also ==
- Lien Chan
