= Lin Wenyue =

Taiwanese writer (1933–2023)

- 林文月
- Born: 5 September 1933; Shanghai, China
- Died: 26 May 2023 (aged 89); Oakland, California, U.S.
- Education: National Taiwan University (BA, MA); Kyoto University
- Occupations: Author, scholar, proser and translator
- Spouse: Guo Yulun (m. 1957)
- Children: 2
- Relatives: Lien Heng (grandfather); Lien Chen-tung (uncle); Lien Chan (cousin); Huang Ta-chou (brother-in-law)
- Writing career
- Language: Chinese, Japanese
- Period: 1960–2023
- Genres: Novel, prose
- Notable works: Yaoyuan; Chat; Schoolroom In the afternoon

Lin Wenyue (Chinese: 林文月; pinyin: Lín Wényuè; 5 September 1933 – 26 May 2023) was a Taiwanese scholar, writer, translator, and professor.

== Biography ==
Lin was born in Shanghai in 1933, with her ancestral home in Changhua County. Lin primarily studied at a Japanese school. Her grandfather, Lien Heng, was a historian, who was Vice President Lien Chan's grandfather.

In 1946, Lin went to Taiwan with her family. In 1952, Lin was accepted to National Taiwan University. After graduation, she worked in Taiwan University as a teacher. Lin married Guo Yulun (Chinese: 郭豫倫) in 1957 in Taiwan. She started to publish books in 1960.

In 1969, Lin went to study Japanese literature at Kyoto University in Japan.

In 1989, Lin went to the United States and was a professor at Washington University in St. Louis. From 1993 to 1999, Lin was a professor at Stanford University, University of California, Berkeley and Charles University.

Lin died in Oakland, California on 26 May 2023, at the age of 89.

== Works ==
=== Prose works ===
- Yaoyuan (Chinese: 遥远)
- Chat (Chinese: 交谈)
- Schoolroom In the afternoon (Chinese: 午后书房)
- Diet Diary (Chinese: 饮膳札记)

=== Biography ===
- Biography of Lian Heng (Chinese: 青山青史：连雅堂传)

=== Translations ===
- The Pillow Book (Chinese: 枕草子)
- Izumi Shikibu's Diary (Chinese: 和泉式部日记)
- The Tale of Genji (Chinese: 源氏物语)
- The Tales of Ise (Chinese: 伊势物语)
- Thirteen Nights (Chinese: 十三夜)

== Awards ==
- Yaoyuan (Chinese: 遥远) – 5th Zhongxing Literature and Art Award
- Schoolroom In the afternoon (Chinese: 午后书房) – 9th China Times Literature Award
- Chat (Chinese: 交谈) – 14th National Literature and Art Award (1988)
- The Tale of Genji (Chinese: 源氏物语) – 19th National Literature and Art Award (1994)
- Diet Diary (Chinese: 饮膳札记) – 3rd Taipei Literature Award
