= General History of Taiwan =

Taiwanese History Book

The General History of Taiwan (Chinese: 臺灣通史) is a work of Taiwanese history in the traditional style of historiography written by Taiwanese historian Lien Heng during the Japanese colonial period. The book was written in the 1910s, completed in 1918, and published in 1920 and 1921. The first and second volumes of the General History were published in 1920 by Lien Heng himself through the Society for the General History of Taiwan set up in Twatutia, Taipei; the third volume was published in 1921. In 1946, the Chungking edition was published, consisting of a first and second volume. The foreword and inscription by Japanese officials were removed and changes were made to the order and content, adding forewords by Hsu Ping-chang and Chang Chi. In 1947, the Shanghai edition was published.

== Content ==
When the General History of Taiwan was published, Taiwan had already been under Japanese rule for 20 years, and it was a time of intense internal and external change. In particular, the 1895 Japanese invasion of Taiwan compelled Taiwanese intellectuals to write down this unprecedented incident and its impact into the historical records. Lien Heng's work attempts to construct a general history of Taiwan using "Taiwan" as the narrative unit, modeled on the traditional Chinese dynastic histography. The history of Taiwan is integrated chronologically in the form of "records" to form a consistent general history, while the "chronicles" (志) and "tables" (表) compile systems and data in the unit of "Taiwan". This historical narrative is neither a fragmentary story nor an individual "event" (events and people are treated as "biographies"), but a collective memory covering the whole of Taiwan. This "historicization" allows the elite intelligentsia of society to share a collective memory and context, so that Taiwan is no longer just a geographical term.

Lien was inspired to write the book at the age of 13, when his father, Lien Te-cheng, gave him a copy of Yu Wen-yi's Supplement to the Taiwan Prefectural Gazetteer (續修臺灣府志) and said to him, "As a Taiwanese citizen, you must not be ignorant of the affairs of Taiwan." Driven by the motivation of his father's enlightenment and the Japanese occupation of Taiwan, Lien Heng wrote his General History from 1908 to 1918, following the style of Sima Qian's Records of the Grand Historian, starting from the first year of Emperor Yang of Sui’s reign (AD 605) and ending with the cession of Taiwan to Japan in 1895. Lien divided the General History of Taiwan into three sections: 1. The Annals, 2. The Records, and 3. The Biographies, totaling 88 articles and 36 volumes, with about 600,000 words, and another 101 items in the accompanying table. Published by the Taiwan General History Publishing House in 1920, this was the first historical work completed by the Taiwanese with the title of "General History of Taiwan". However, Lian Heng's account of the short-lived Republic of Formosa was initially written in the "Independence Era" and later changed to the "Transition Era" to avoid controversy.

== Evaluation of the 1895 Japanese invasion of Taiwan ==
According to historian Wu Mi-cha, the historical wave of change brought about by the cession of Taiwan compelled Taiwanese intellectuals to become aware of history and triggered the historiography writing of Taiwanese intellectuals at that time, a catalyst that drove the writings on the local history of Taiwan. For example, Si Tong-tzu and Hung Chi-sheng wrote about the difference in levels of resistance among the Qing bureaucrats and the local gentry at the time of the cession of Taiwan in terms of anger and anxiety, evaluating "who fought bravely and who left without a fight?" This was also documented in Lien Heng's General History. In the book, the "Independence Era" is used to describe the Republic of Formosa, and the biographies of Chiu Feng-chia, Wu Tang-hsing, Hsu Hsiang, Chiang Shao-tsu, Lin Kun-kang, Wu Peng-nien, Tang Ching-sung, and Liu Yung-fu. The General History of Taiwan expresses its "historical writing" in the form of a list of biographies. For example, Chiu Feng-chia, who advocated the establishment of Taiwan's democratic state but left without a fight, is listed in a separate biography. Wu Tang-hsing, Hsu Hsiang, Chiang Shao-tsu, and Lin Kun-kang, who led locals to fight and eventually perish in battle, are written under a single chronicle. Wu Peng-nien, a general of the Black Flag Army who died in the battle at Bagua Mountain, is listed in a separate biography. Tang Ching-sung and Liu Yung-fu, Qing Dynasty officials and defending commanders who claimed to live and die with Taiwan but abandoned the people, are listed in a combined biography. The General History of Taiwan even comments on historical figures after the biography in the form of "Lien Heng's comments". In describing the Japanese invasion of Taiwan, Lien Heng considers "who fought bravely and who left without a fight" a key topic in the General History.

== Modern "translation" ==
In recognition of the book's centenary, a "translation" into more contemporary language was begun in 2021 and published in February 2024. It involved a team of scholars from both Taiwan and China, and was promoted by Lien's descendants, politician Lien Chan and his daughter Arlene Lien.
