= Lien Chen-tung =

Taiwanese politician

- 連震東
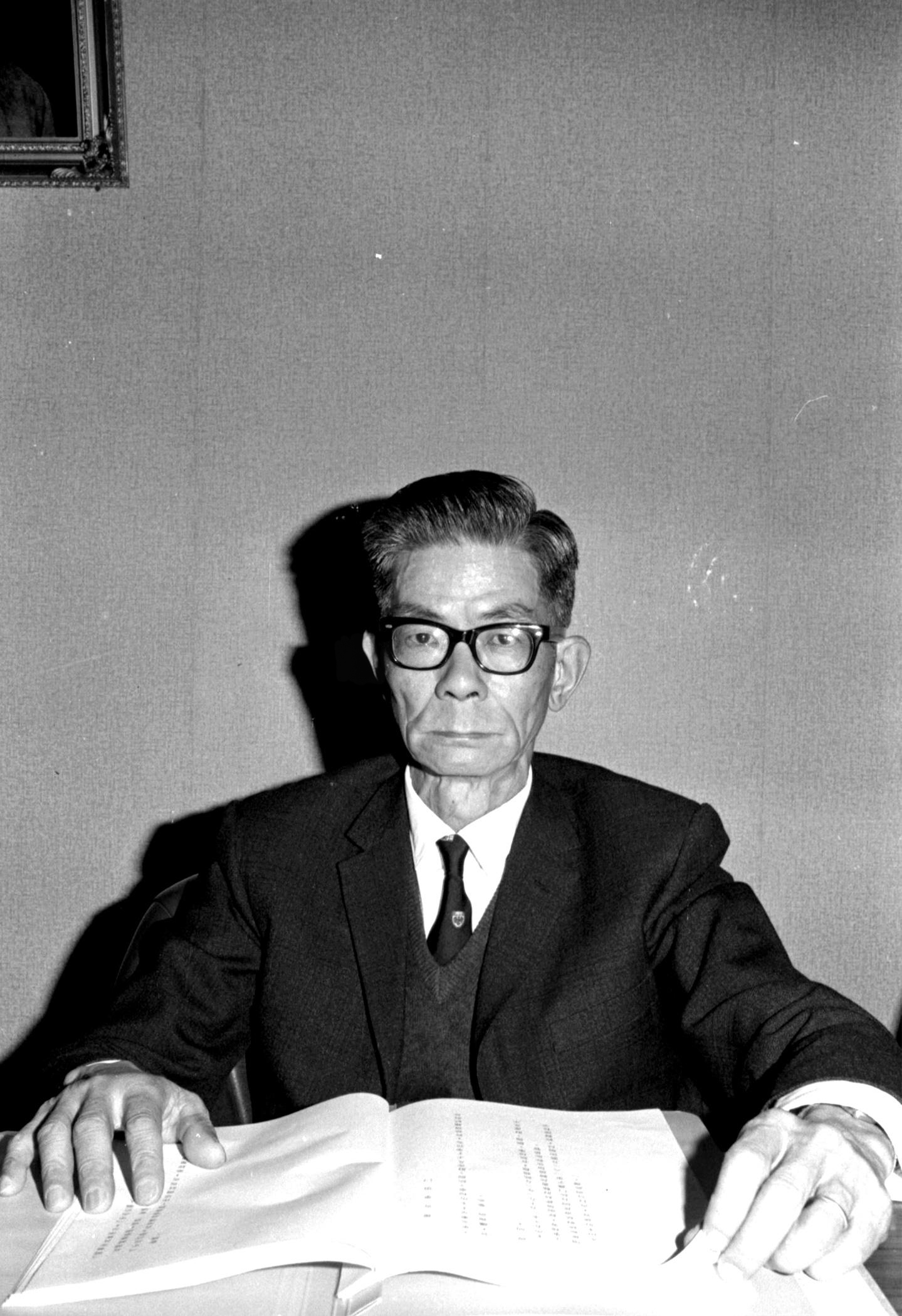
- Lien in October 1970

10th Minister of the Interior
- In office 1 June 1960 – 3 June 1966
- Premier: Chen Cheng; Yen Chia-kan
- Preceded by: Tien Chung-chin
- Succeeded by: Hsu Ching-chung

Personal details
- Born: 23 April 1904 West Central District, Tainan City, Taiwan, Empire of Japan
- Died: 1 December 1986 (aged 82) Zhongzheng District, Taipei City, Taiwan
- Party: Kuomintang
- Spouse: Chao Lan-k'un
- Children: Lien Chan (son)
- Parent: Lien Heng (father)
- Relatives: Lin Wenyue (niece)
- Education: Keio University (BEc)

Lien Chen-tung (Chinese: 連震東; 23 April 1904 – 1 December 1986) was a Taiwanese statesman and politician who was the tenth Republic of China Minister of the Interior. Lien was also the first official county magistrate of Taipei County, a representative of the National Assembly, a member of the Executive Yuan, and a national policy advisor to the Office of the President. His son Lien Chan was the seventh Vice President of the Republic of China and a former chairman of the Kuomintang.

== Biography ==
=== Pre-war ===
Lien Chen-tung was born in the West Central District of Tainan City, Taiwan. He was the only son of Taiwanese historian Lien Heng.

He graduated from the Economics Department of Keio University in Japan in 1929 and joined the Showa New Newspaper after returning to Taiwan.

In July 1933, his father Lien Heng brought his family to stay in Shanghai.

In 1934, Lien Chen-tung and Chao Lan-k'un (趙蘭坤) got married in Beijing. She was born into a well-known family in Shenyang and was a graduate of Beijing Yanjing University.

On 28 June 1936, his father Lien Heng died of liver cancer in Shanghai at age 58, while Lien was 32 years old. On 27 August, his wife Chao gave birth to Lien Chan in Xi'an.

The National Government intended to appoint him to be the first mayor after the reorganization of Xi’an in Xijing. The assignment was on hold after the Second Sino-Japanese War broke out. During the war, Lien Chen-tung served as the head of the Chongqing National Government Institute of International Studies and a member of the Xijing Preparatory Committee.

According to recollections shared by his son Lien Chan in 2014, Lien Chen-tung developed a close personal and professional friendship with General Hu Zongnan during the early 1930s. In 1931, while Hu was stationed in Xi’an, he established the Fourth Wartime Cadre Training Regiment (戰時工作幹部訓練第四團), an institution intended to train political cadres as a countermeasure to the Chinese Communist Party’s Anti-Japanese Military and Political University in Yan’an. Lien was invited by Hu to serve as one of the regiment’s political instructors. During this period, the two met frequently, and a lasting friendship developed between their families.

After the Nationalist government’s retreat to Taiwan in 1949, the Hu and Lien families maintained regular social contact, often visiting one another and renewing their prewar association.

=== Post-war ===
After Second World War the National Government of the Republic of China took back the rule of Taiwan and the Penghu Islands from the Empire of Japan. In November 1945, Taiwanese Chief Executive Chen Yi appointed Lien as the first chairman of the Taipei State Reception Management Committee. His duty was to formally take over the military affairs of Taipei.

In January 1946, Lien was the acting Taipei County Magistrate and director of the Construction Bureau. Lien's focus was the roads and railways in Taiwan, Soon after the war they were repaired and opened to regular access. Local facilities resumed regular operations and factories resumed production.

In February 1946, Lien's wife Chao Lan-k'un brought his 8-year-old son Lien Chan back to Taiwan to reunite with his father.

Towards the end of February 1946, Lien relocated to the Taiwan Provincial Chief Executive's Office. He was in charge of organizing the Provincial Consultative Council. That May, the council Inaugurated, and Lien was subsequently appointed the Secretary-General of the Taiwan Provincial Consultative Council.

In November 1947, Lien Chen-tung was elected to the first National Assembly in his hometown Tainan.

In 1948, Lien was appointed as a member of the Constitutional Supervision Committee. In 1949, he served as the land director of the Southeast Military and Political Affairs Office and the drafting committee of the Taiwan Provincial-Local Autonomy Program. Lien had contributions to the implementation of local autonomy and land reform. After the National Government moved to Taiwan in 1950, Lien was appointed as a member of the Central Reconstruction Committee. He was the only Taiwanese person among the 16 members. He was also the president of the China Daily. He was later reassigned as the chairman of the board of directors.

In 1953, Lien served as the fifth group director of the Kuomintang Central Party Department and was appointed as a member of the Taiwan Provincial Government and the director of construction. One year later, he was transferred to the Ministry of Civil Affairs of the Taiwan Provincial Government, where he actively promoted local self-government. He also served as the secretary-general of the Taiwan Provincial Government. In 1955, the government held the first census of Taiwan Province, and Lien was also the deputy director of the Census Department.

In 1958, Lien Chen-tung was elected to the supervisor of the Provincial Police People's Association.

On 25 March 1960, Lien was appointed as the Deputy Secretary-General of the Kuomintang and as a result, resigned as a member of the Taiwan Provincial Government and Minister of Civil Affairs. In May, due to the reformation of the Executive Yuan, he served as the new Minister of the Interior of the Executive Yuan. His main contributions were the establishment of the military service system and the implementation of local election government policy.

In May 1960 the newly formed Election Reform Study Committee publicly accused the Kuomintang of widespread electoral fraud and specifically named Lien as "the mastermind and chief executor of all fraudulent practices in Taiwan." Lien held an emergency press conference denying the Committee's charges, stating that "the six accusations raised by the Committee against the government are entirely untrue."

In 1961, Lien's son Lien Chan obtained a master's degree in international public law and diplomacy from the University of Chicago with the paper “Taiwan's Land Reform”. In 1965, Lien Chan was under the guidance of Tsou Tang, and obtained a doctorate in political science from the University of Chicago with the title of "Chinese Communism versus Pragmatism: The Criticism of Hu Shih's Philosophy". On 5 September, Lien Chan married Fang Yu, at the Pound Church, University of Chicago.

In 1963, Lien Chen-tung was elected as the Standing Committee member of the Central Committee during the 9th National Congress of the Kuomintang. In 1966, he was designated as the director of the Census Department of the Executive Yuan. He then resigned as the Minister of the Interior and served as a member of the Executive Council. In 1967, Lien Chen-tung was appointed as a member of the National Security Council and the convener for the National Construction and Design Committee. In 1969, during the 10th National Congress of the Kuomintang, Lien Chen-tung was assigned as a member of the Central Review Committee. In 1976, he was appointed as the national policy advisor of the Office of the President. In 1980, he was reappointed as the senior advisor to the office of the president.

== Family ==
Lien's family lived in Ningnan Square of Tainan. During the Japanese occupation, the property of Lien's family was confiscated by the Japanese because they supported the Liu Yong-fu Black Flag Army. After Taiwan’s recovery, Lien's family moved to Taipei, so his wife Chao Lan-k'un sold all their remaining property left in Miaoli. She used the money to invest in real estate, construction, and finance. By holding their investments for a long duration, coinciding with the economic takeoff in Asia after World War 2, the Lien family gained wealth after decades.

Lien's father is Lien Heng, he had three sisters, Lin Wenyue was the daughter of his eldest sister. His wife was Chao Lan-k'un.

His son is Lien Chan, the seventh Vice President of the Republic of China and the honorary Chairman of the Kuomintang. Lien Chan is credited with chartering a historic visit to Mainland China in his appointment as Chairman of the Kuomintang to meet with then General Secretary of the Chinese Communist Party Hu Jintao. This was the first meeting between the two-party leaders since the end of the Chinese Civil War.

== Legacy ==
In 1986, Lien Chen-tung died at the National Taiwan University Hospital at the age of 82. He was laid to rest at the Yangmingshan First Cemetery.

From his return to Taiwan in 1945 until his death in 1986, Lien has served as the first Taipei County mayor, minister of the interior, standing committee member of the Central Committee of the Chinese Kuomintang, member of the Executive Yuan, national policy advisor to the office of the president, and senior advisor to the office of the president.

總統令 Presidential Decree No. 548

On 23 December 1986, President Chiang Ching-kuo issued Presidential Decree No. 548 to commemorate Lien Chen-tung. The contents are as follows:

Presidential Decree No. 548

Lien Chen-tung was a representative of the National Assembly and the Senior Advisor to the Office of the President. He inherited his family custom to serve the country. He profoundly understood the nation's interests and had entirely devoted himself to the motherland after graduating to protect the country from foreign countries' attacks. After the Second Sino-Japanese War, while Taiwan was recovering, Lien was elected as a member of the Constitution Committee and the representative of the First National Assembly. Lien served respectively as the First Taipei County Magistrate, the Secretary-General of the Taiwan Provincial Council, the Director of the Construction Department of the Taiwan Provincial Government, the Director of Civil Affairs, and the Minister of the Interior. Lien had great contributions to land reform, the development of the economy, and the establishment of the Military Service. Especially in the aspect of local self-government, his contribution was evident and profound. Since upholding the role as Senior Advisor to the Office of the President, he had made outstanding contributions to the country. He was public-spirited, which had been long praised by the public. We deeply mourn for his passing and feel that a citation should be given to praise his loyalty and contributions to the country.

President: Chiang Ching-kuo

Premier: Yu Kuo-hwa

23 December 1986
