= Lien Chan =

Taiwanese political scientist and politician (born 1936)

- 連戰
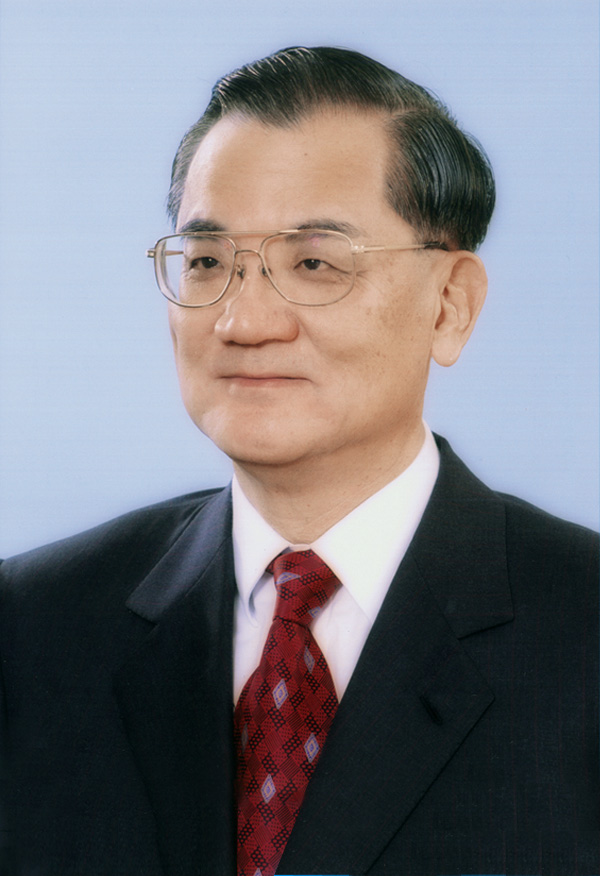

7th Vice President of the Republic of China
- In office May 20, 1996 – May 20, 2000
- President: Lee Teng-hui
- Preceded by: Lee Yuan-tsu
- Succeeded by: Annette Lu

Premier of the Republic of China
- In office February 27, 1993 – August 31, 1997
- President: Lee Teng-hui
- Vice Premier: Hsu Li-teh
- Preceded by: Hau Pei-tsun
- Succeeded by: Vincent Siew

3rd Chairman of the Kuomintang
- In office March 24, 2000 – August 19, 2005
- Deputy: Vincent Siew; Wang Jin-pyng; Chiang Chung-ling; Wu Po-hsiung; Lin Cheng-tze; Chiang Pin-kung; Ma Ying-jeou
- Preceded by: Lee Teng-hui
- Succeeded by: Ma Ying-jeou

Governor of Taiwan Province
- In office June 16, 1990 – February 25, 1993
- Preceded by: Chiu Chuang-huan
- Succeeded by: James Soong

Vice Premier of the Republic of China
- In office May 1, 1987 – July 22, 1988
- Premier: Yu Kuo-hwa
- Preceded by: Lin Yang-kang
- Succeeded by: Shih Chi-yang
Ministerial offices
10th Minister of Foreign Affairs
In office July 20, 1988 – June 1, 1990
Premier	Yu Kuo-hwa; Lee Huan
Preceded by	Ting Mao-shih
Succeeded by	Fredrick Chien
11th Minister of Transportation and Communications
In office December 1, 1981 – April 23, 1987
Premier	Sun Yun-suan; Yu Kuo-hwa
Preceded by	Lin Chin-sheng
Succeeded by	Kuo Nan-hung
Chair of the National Youth Commission
In office August 1, 1978 – November 30, 1981
Premier	Sun Yun-suan
Preceded by	Wang Wei-nung
Succeeded by	Kao Ming-hui

Personal details
- Born: 27 August 1936 (age 90) Xi'an, Shaanxi, China
- Party: Kuomintang
- Spouse: Fang Yu (m. 1965)
- Children: 4, including Sean and Arlene
- Parent: Lien Chen-tung (father)
- Relatives: Lien Heng (grandfather); Lin Wenyue (cousin)
- Education: National Taiwan University (BA); University of Chicago (MA, PhD)
- Scientific career
- Fields: Political science
- Thesis: The Criticism of Hu Shih's Thought in Communist China (1965)
- Doctoral advisor: Tsou Tang

Chinese name
- Traditional Chinese: 連戰
Transcriptions
Standard Mandarin
- Hanyu Pinyin: Lián Zhàn
- Wade–Giles: Lien² Chan⁴
Southern Min
- Hokkien POJ: Liân Chiàn

Lien Chan (Chinese: 連戰; pinyin: Lián Zhàn; born 27 August 1936) is a Taiwanese political scientist and politician. A member of the Kuomintang (KMT), he nominally governed Taiwan as the head of the Taiwan Provincial Government from 1990 to 1993 and served as Premier of the Republic of China from 1993 to 1997, Vice President of the Republic of China from 1996 to 2000, and Chairman of the Kuomintang from 2000 to 2005.

Lien was born in China to a prominent Taiwanese family of intellectuals. After graduating from National Taiwan University, he earned his doctorate in political science from the University of Chicago in 1965 and began an academic career in the United States as a professor at the University of Wisconsin and the University of Connecticut. Upon returning to Taiwan in 1968, he became a professor at National Taiwan University, entered politics, and held multiple ministerial and executive offices.

During the 1990s, Lien was a close aide of President Lee Teng-hui and introduced several of Lee's constitutional reforms. He ran for the presidency on behalf of the Kuomintang twice, but lost both times in 2000 and 2004 to Chen Shui-bian of the Democratic Progressive Party. As party chairman, he was highly credited for holding a groundbreaking visit to mainland China to meet Chinese leader Hu Jintao in 2005, the first meeting between party leaders of the KMT and the CCP since the end of the Chinese Civil War. The event was considered significant for encouraging cross-strait relations.

== Early life and education ==
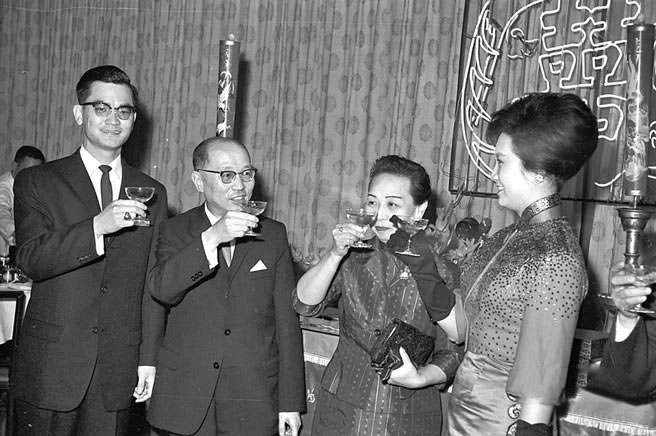
Premier Yen Chia-kan officiates the wedding of Lien Chan and Fang Yu

Lien Chan was born in Xi'an, Shaanxi, on August 27, 1936. He was the only child of Taiwanese politician Lien Chen-tung and his wife Chao Lan-kun (趙蘭坤), the latter a graduate of Yenching University who was born to a prominent Manchu family in Shenyang. Chen-tung served as the head of the Ministry of the Interior from 1960 to 1966 and was an advocate of promoting local autonomy and maintaining closer ties with the CC Clique. Lien's paternal grandfather, the prominent Taiwanese historian Lien Heng (1878–1936), was the author of the popular book The General History of Taiwan. (Note: Following the 1931 Mukden incident and the lead-up to the Second Sino-Japanese War, Lien Heng gave Lien Chan his name "Chan" (戰), meaning "war".) On his father's side, Lien Chan was descended from a prominent and wealthy merchant family from Tainan, Taiwan, whose ancestral home was located in Longji. In the early 1960s, his father became the seventh-wealthiest man in Taiwan by leveraging his connections in the Kuomintang (KMT) and speculating on land purchases.

Lien attended the Tso-hsiu Primary School (作秀小學) in Xi'an before moving with his family to Taiwan—where his father held multiple government offices—following the Retrocession of Taiwan in 1945. He then was educated at the Affiliated Senior High School of National Taiwan Normal University (HSNU), where he was a classmate of future politician Koh Se-kai. The two were close friends, studied together, and considered each other as "the two Taiwanese" enrolled at the school. Koh later recalled, "I was not aware of the number of differences between the Mainlander and Taiwanese students at first. Only when I started to speak in Taiwanese did I realize that none of my classmates would be able to understand me—except Lien Chan. I became aware that Lien and I were the minority".

After graduating from high school, Lien studied political science at National Taiwan University and received a bachelor's degree in the subject in 1957. As an undergraduate, he was a student of Taiwanese independence activist Peng Ming-min, who was a professor of political science at the university. After graduation, Lien completed military service at Fu Hsing Kang College and joined the Kuomintang. He left Taiwan in 1959 to pursue advanced studies in the United States, earning a Master of Arts (M.A.) in international law and diplomacy in 1961 and his Ph.D. in political science in 1965, both from the University of Chicago. His master's thesis was titled, "Agrarian reform in nationalist China". His doctoral dissertation, completed under political science professor Tsou Tang, was titled, "The criticism of Hu Shih's thought in Communist China".

== Academic career ==
After receiving his doctorate, Lien became an assistant professor of political science at the University of Wisconsin–Madison, where he taught from 1966 to 1967. He then became an assistant professor at the University of Connecticut and taught there from 1967 to 1968.

In 1968, Lien returned to Taiwan and joined the political science faculty at National Taiwan University, where he was a visiting professor from 1968 to 1969, then a full professor from 1969 to 1975, during which period he headed the department and was the dean of the university's graduate institute of political science.

== Political career ==
His official positions included Ambassador to El Salvador (1975–1976), Minister of Transportation and Communications (1981–1987), Vice Premier (1987–1988), Foreign Minister (1988–1990) before becoming Governor of Taiwan Province (1990–1993). In 1993 he was appointed Premier of the Republic of China. In 1996, Lee Teng-hui selected him as running mate in the presidential election. Lee and Lien won the election for the presidency and the vice-presidency respectively. Before becoming Chairman of the KMT, he was Vice Chairman (1993–2000) and a member of the Central Committee (1984–2000).

During his term in office, Lien was credited for having established National Health Insurance, which is the national health insurance policy for all citizens of the Republic of China. It ranks as one of the best national health plans in the world and modeled by other nations who seek to have a national health coverage for other citizens. He spearheaded the constructions of Cross-Island Highway (橫貫公路), a series of highways that connected the eastern side of the island to the western side of the island. Taiwan is dominated by the Central Mountain Range which cordons off the east from the west. In order to go to the eastern side from the western side, one had to circle the island to reach their destinations before the highways were constructed. After Lien constructed these highways, traffic back-and-forth between the east and west of the island was much more efficient. He also began the reconstruction to the military dependents' villages (眷村) which were temporary shelters designated for the military personnel and their families when the Kuomintang (KMT) first moved to Taiwan. There are over 879 of these military dependents' villages which housing nearly 100,000 households within. Most of this housing was temporary shelter and were constructed during the period between 1945 and 1950s to house the military personnel as the KMT retreated to Taiwan. Half a century later when it became clear that reunification with mainland China under the terms of the Republic of China would not be possible, it became obvious that the housing for the military personnel would have to be reconstructed.

Throughout Lien's term as Foreign Minister and through his premiership, about 30 countries had diplomatic relations with Republic of China (Taiwan), this was the highest number of diplomatic relations since Republic of China was expelled from the United Nations in 1972 and severed diplomatic relations with the United States in 1976. Lien also established diplomatic relations with Commonwealth of the Bahamas, Grenada, Belize, Republic of Guinea-Bissau and reestablished diplomatic relations with Kingdom of Lesotho, Republic of Liberia and the Republic of Nicaragua.

Lien also established the foundations for the Internet in Taiwan via research centers established under the National Science Council (國家科學委員會). Furthermore, he liberalized the telecommunications network which allowed for multiple players to compete and ushered in the mobile service era in the telecommunications sector. He also revised and deregulated the regulation on cable television sector that allowed for multiple players in the television and cable sectors. These policies made Taiwan the most liberal area in Asia for media.

For the purpose of developing Taiwan as an economic hub in the Asia-Pacific, Lien espoused a platform called the "Asia-Pacific Regional Operations Center" because Taiwan has two natural deep water harbors, one is Keelung and second one is Kaohsiung, shipments from all over the world would transport and transfer in these harbors before heading to Japan, Korea, China or Southeast Asia. However, due to Lee Teng-hui's (李登輝) "two-state solution" (兩國論), a theory advocated for China and Taiwan to engage in a special "state to state relationship", mainland China was deeply angered, therefore Taiwan became increasingly marginalized.

Lien took an active role as a representative of Lee Teng-hui in quasi-official diplomacy in the mid-1990s. One of the greatest moments of his career is his 1995 meeting with Václav Havel, in which Lien likened the democratic reforms of the Lee Teng-hui administration as being similar to the Velvet Revolution.

After the defeat of the KMT in 2000, Lien assume the leadership of the KMT. As the Chairman of the KMT, Lien vowed to learn from his loss and remake the KMT party. He held forums to discuss erasing the KMT's image as a corrupt institution and Lien promised to give up property seized by the KMT after the Japanese exodus.

The Pan-Blue reunited in the election of 2004 with Lien and Soong running on a combined ticket against DPP's Chen Shui-bian and Annette Lu. Chen Shui-bian was the incumbent and was trailing 13% behind in the polls before ballot day. Then, out of nowhere came two bullets, one barely grazing Chen's belly and another one grazing Annette Lu's knee. Immediately the DPP-control government suspended all election activities and prohibited all servicemen, policeman and security workers to return home to vote. The servicemen are typically Pan-Blue voters and number of service men affected was roughly 350,000. The DPP Secretary General of the President's office Chiou I-jen (邱義仁) immediately came out on media to announce that there was an assassination attempt on the DPP candidates Chen and Lu and accused the KMT of collaborating with the Chinese Communist Party to assassinate Taiwan's president. Lien lost that election by 0.228% margin, a mere 29,518 votes out of a total of 12,914,422 (12 million nine hundred and fourteen thousand four hundred and twenty two) ballots cast. Both Chen and Lu were released from the hospital on the same day and went to vote on the next day. Neither one had life-threatening injury nor did they lose consciousness or had a surgery. Rather, alleged assassin Chen Yi-hsiung (陳義雄) was killed and his body was found ten days later ditched into a pond near where he lives. His body was formally dressed in suite and tie and entangled in a fishnet.

This incident sparked mass riots and controversy because it was believed that the shooting was staged in order to gain sympathy votes for Chen and Lu who won by a sliver of a margin. Hence the 319 Shooting Truth Investigation Special Committee was established.

On January 31, 2008, the 319 Shooting Truth Investigation Special Committee concluded its investigation into the assassination attempt on President Chen Shui-bian (陳水扁) and Vice President Annette Lu (呂秀蓮), and raised questions about whether the shooting was a staged event. "We have compared all of the evidence and clues through interviews and reconstructed the scene. Although the truth of the event remains unclear, the "truth" that government publicized and the evidence don't match," committee convener Wang Ching-feng (王清峰) told reporters. The report also suggested that Chen Yi-hsiung (陳義雄), whom the authorities identified as the shooter, was murdered instead of committing suicide when he was found dead 10 days after the incident.

In 2005, after Ma was elected as KMT chairman to succeed Lien, the KMT Central Committee offered the title of "Chairman Emeritus" (Honorary Chairman) to Lien.

In December 2010, Lien was awarded the Confucius Peace Prize in China, which was instituted as a reaction to the Nobel Peace Prize awarded to Liu Xiaobo. Lien's office said to the Taipei Times, "We've never heard of such an award and of course Mr Lien has no plans to accept it."

== Cross-strait relations ==
=== April 2005 breakthrough journey to mainland China ===
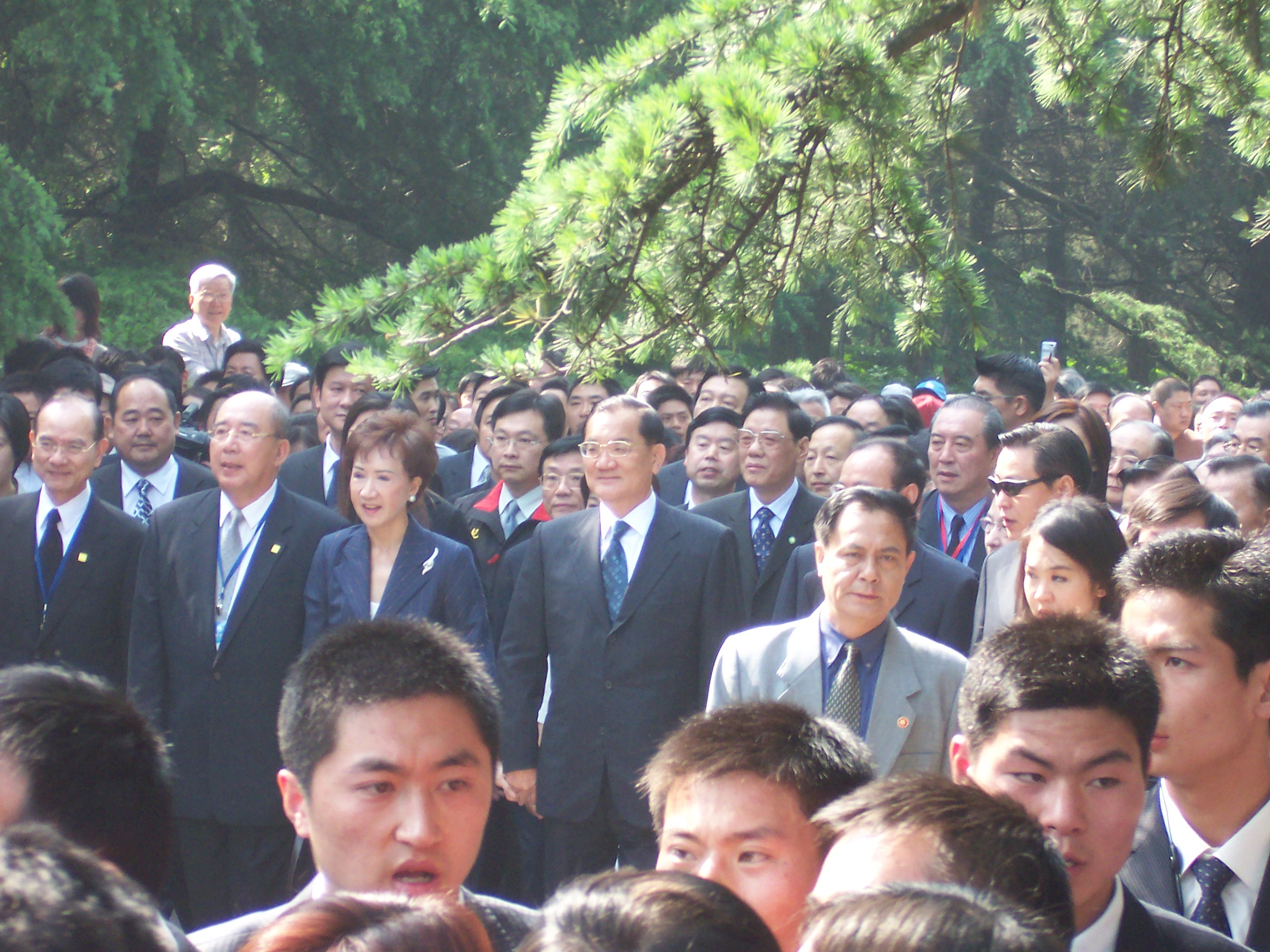
Lien Chan and the Kuomintang touring the Sun Yat-sen Mausoleum in Nanjing. The Pan-Blue coalition visited the mainland in 2005.

On April 26, 2005, Lien Chan traveled to mainland China to meet with the leaders of the Chinese Communist Party (CCP). His meeting with Communist Party general secretary Hu Jintao was the highest level exchange since Chiang Kai-shek and Mao Zedong met in Chongqing on August 28, 1945, to celebrate the victory in the Second Sino-Japanese War and discuss a possible truce in the impending Chinese Civil War.

On April 27, Lien visited the Sun Yat-sen Mausoleum in Nanjing. On April 28, he arrived in Beijing.

On the afternoon of April 29, he met with PRC Paramount leader Hu Jintao (in his capacity as General Secretary of the Chinese Communist Party).

Before meeting with Hu on April 29, Lien Chan delivered a speech at Peking University, which his 96-year-old mother Chao Lan-kun attended nearly 80 years ago. On April 30, he headed to his birthplace Xi'an. He revisited Houzaimen Primary School, which he attended 60 years ago. He also visited the Great Mausoleum of Qin Shi Huang, China's first emperor. Early on May 1, he paid homage to his grandmother's tomb near Qingliangsi.

Later that day, Lien arrived in Shanghai, where he attended a banquet hosted by Shanghai CCP Party Secretary General Chen Liangyu. On May 2, he met with Wang Daohan, the 90-year-old chairman of the mainland-based Association for Relations Across the Taiwan Straits, and the representatives of Taiwanese businesspeople. He returned to Taiwan at noon on May 3.

=== October 2005 visit to Shenyang ===
In October 2005, Lien made his second visit to the mainland. He visited Shenyang, Liaoning to pay homage to his maternal grandmother's tomb at Lansheng Village and the school where his mother studied.

=== 2006 visit to Mainland China ===
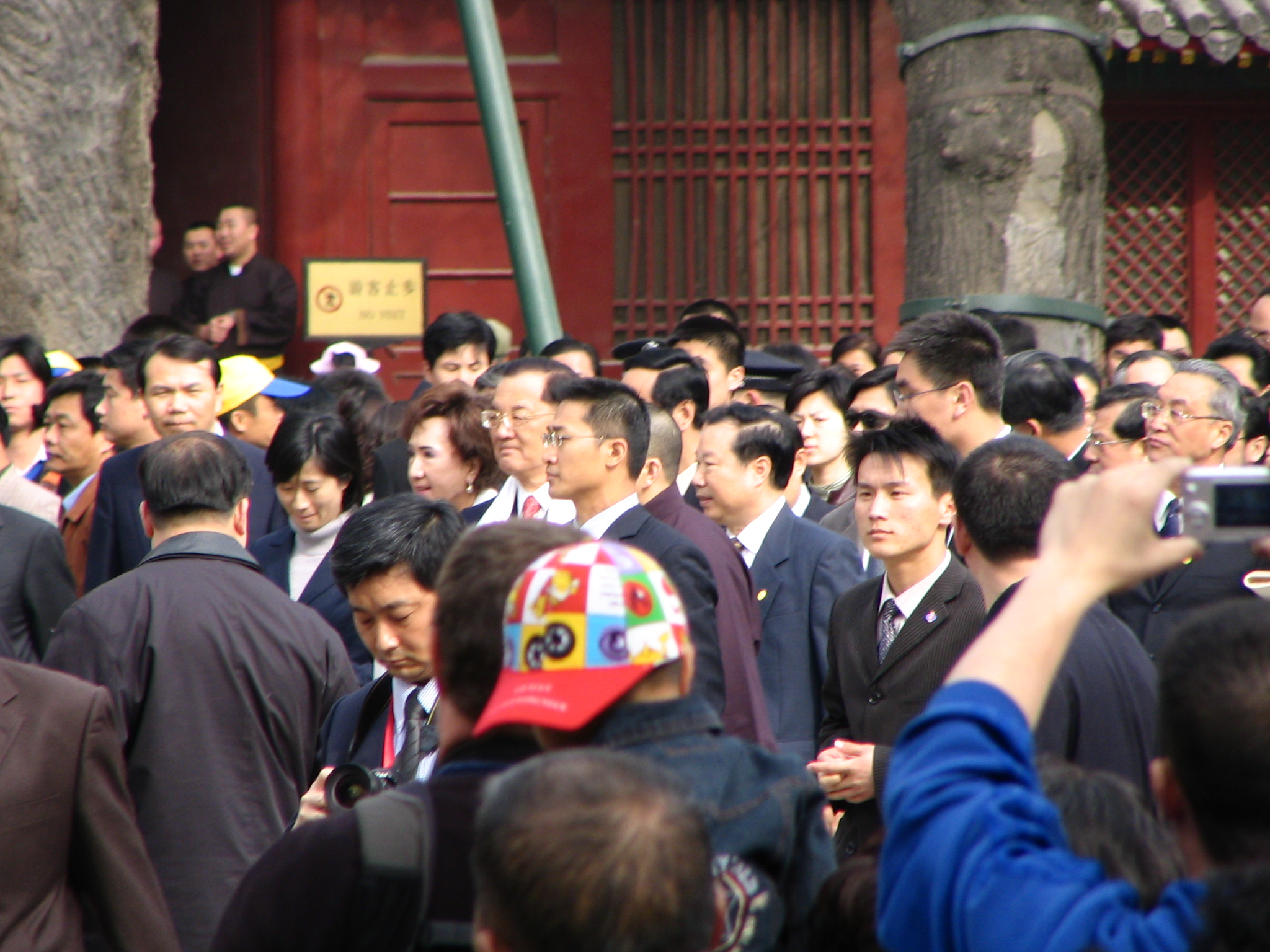
Lien Chan in Beijing in April 2006

In April 2006, Lien departed to mainland China to visit Fujian. He paid tribute to his ancestors in Zhangzhou and received an honorary doctor's degree from Xiamen University.

On April 11, 2006, Lien arrived in Hangzhou, Zhejiang. He was welcomed by Xia Baolong, deputy secretary of Zhejiang Provincial Committee of the Chinese Communist Party at the Hangzhou Xiaoshan International Airport. In Hangzhou, Lien met with provincial government leaders and visited the West Lake.

Two days later, Lien visited Beijing to attend the first Cross-Straits Economic Trade and Culture Forum. Lien met with CCP general secretary Hu Jintao at the forum, where both underscored the peaceful development of relations between the two sides.

=== 2010 visit to Shanghai ===
In April 2010, Lien visited Shanghai to attend the opening ceremony of the Shanghai World Expo 2010.

=== 2013 visit to Beijing ===
In February 2013, Lien visited Beijing to meet with Xi Jinping, the newly elected General Secretary of the Chinese Communist Party.

Lien also met with Yu Zhengsheng (chairman-designate of the Chinese People's Political Consultative Conference), Wang Huning (member of the Politburo of the CCP), Li Zhanshu (chief of the General Office of the CCP), Dai Bingguo (state councilor of the PRC), Wang Yi (director of the Taiwan Affairs Office of the State Council), Chen Yunlin and Zheng Lizhong (president and vice president of ARATS).

Lien and his wife Lien Fang Yu also visited Beijing Aerospace Command and Control Center and met with Liu Wang, Liu Yang and Jing Haipeng, astronauts of the Shenzhou 9.

=== 2014 visit to Beijing ===
Lien and delegates from 80 business leaders and civil group representatives, including former Taiwan Solidarity Union Chairman Shu Chin-chiang, visited Beijing on 17 February to meet with Zhang Zhijun, the head of Taiwan Affairs Office, and on 18 February with Xi Jinping, General Secretary of the Chinese Communist Party CCP Central Committee, at the Diaoyutai State Guesthouse for non-governmental exchanges. This 3-day trip came after the invitation from the Chinese Communist Party.

=== 2015 visit to Beijing ===
Lien was invited to a Chinese military parade marking the end of the Second Sino–Japanese War in September 2015. During the visit, Lien asked Beijing to strongly consider supporting ROC President Ma Ying-jeou's East China Sea Peace Initiative.

== APEC representative ==
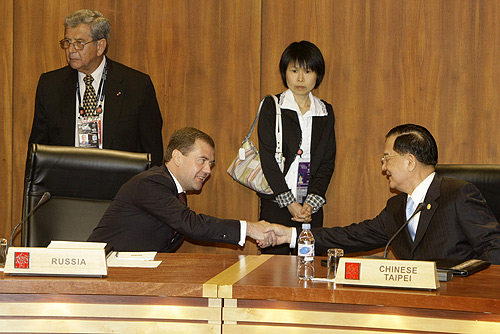
Lien Chan at the 2008 APEC Summit in Peru with Dmitry Medvedev.

Lien was selected by President Ma Ying-jeou as special envoy to represent the Republic of China (participating as Chinese Taipei) at the Asia-Pacific Economic Cooperation (APEC) in 2008–2012.

While at APEC, Lien also met with Chinese Communist Party general secretary Hu Jintao, the highest level of official exchange between the Mainland and Taiwan on the international stage at that time.

== Name ==
His family name is Lien; his given name is Chan. Chan means "battles" and his full name literally means "successive battles." The name originated from Lien Heng who wrote to his pregnant daughter-in-law in Xi'an:

China and Japan will battle inevitably. If the child born is a boy, name him Lien Chan, signifying that the strength coming from within oneself will never diminish and can overcome the enemies and be victorious. It also has the meaning of reviving the former nation, reorganizing the light and hope of our homeland.

— 『中、日必將一戰，如生男則名連戰，寓有自強不息，克敵制勝，有復興故國、重整家園光明希望。』

== Personal life ==
Lien married former Miss Republic of China Fang Yu in 1965, the same year he received his doctorate. Later, in 2012, Lien served as a trustee on the Board of Trustees of the University of Chicago. He has two sons with Fang: Sean Lien (連勝文) and Lien Sheng-wu (連勝武). They also have two daughters: Arlene Lien (連惠心) and Lien Yung-hsin (連詠心).

== Selected publications ==
- Lien, Chan (1968). "Sun Yat-sen on Land Utilization". Agricultural History. 42 (4). Duke University Press: 297–303. ISSN 0002-1482. JSTOR 3741814.
- Lien, Chan (1968). "Chinese Communism versus Pragmatism: The Criticism of Hu Shih's Philosophy, 1950-1958". The Journal of Asian Studies. 27 (3). Duke University Press: 551–570. doi:10.2307/2051156. ISSN 0021-9118. JSTOR 2051156.

== See also ==
- Kuomintang
- Politics of the Republic of China
- Elections in the Republic of China
- History of the Republic of China
- Administrative divisions of the Republic of China
- Political status of Taiwan
- The Four Princelings of Kuomintang

== Footnotes ==
Government offices
Preceded by Wang Wei-nung	Chair of National Youth Commission; 1978–1981	Succeeded by Kao Ming-hui
Preceded by Lin Chin-sheng	Ministry of Transportation and Communications; 1981–1987	Succeeded by Kuo Nan-hung
Preceded by Lin Yang-kang	Vice Premier of the Republic of China; 1987–1988	Succeeded by Shih Chi-yang
Preceded by Ting Mao-shih	Minister of Foreign Affairs; 1988–1990	Succeeded by Fredrick Chien
Preceded by Chiu Chuang-huan	Governor of Taiwan Province; 1990–1993	Succeeded by James Soong
Preceded by Hau Pei-tsun	Premier of the Republic of China; 1993–1997	Succeeded by Vincent Siew
Preceded by Li Yuan-zu	Vice President of the Republic of China; 1996–2000	Succeeded by Annette Lu
Party political offices
Preceded by Lee Teng-hui	Kuomintang nominee for President of the Republic of China; 2000, 2004	Succeeded by Ma Ying-jeou
Preceded by Lee Teng-hui	Leader of the Kuomintang; 2000–2005	Succeeded by Ma Ying-jeou
