= 9th Congress of the Sammarinese Communist Party =

Coordinates: 43.928333°N 12.452101°E

The ninth congress of the Sammarinese Communist Party was held between December 10 and December 12, 1976, at Palazzo dei Congressi in the City of San Marino. The event was chaired by the party general secretary, Umberto Barulli. The congress was visited by delegations from the Soviet Union (Vadim Zagladin), Italy, the German Democratic Republic, Romania, Bulgaria, Czechoslovakia, Hungary, Palestine, Yugoslavia and Chile.
