= Lien Fang Yu =

- 連方瑀
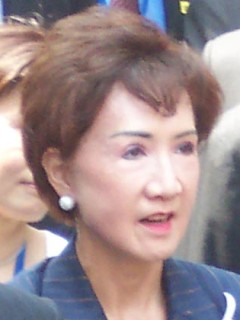

Second Lady of the Republic of China
- In office 20 May 1996 – 20 May 2000
- Vice President: Lien Chan
- Preceded by: Xu Manyun

Personal details
- Born: 14 April 1943 (age 83) Chongqing, China
- Spouse: Lien Chan
- Children: Sean Lien, Arlene Lien
- Education: National Taiwan University (BS); University of Connecticut (MS)

Lien Fang Yu (Chinese: 連方瑀; pinyin: Lián Fāng Yǔ) born 14 April 1943 as Fang Yu (方瑀; Fāng Yǔ), is the wife of Lien Chan, chairman of the Kuomintang party from 2000 to 2005. Fang was born in Chongqing, and is a former Miss Republic of China.

Fang and Lien were married in 1965, the same year that Lien received a PhD in political science from the University of Chicago.
