= Arlene Lien =

Taiwanese education professor

Lien Hui-hsin
- 連惠心
- Born: August 1, 1967 (age 58)
- Education: Wellesley College (BA); Harvard University (MEd); Columbia University (DEd)
- Occupation: Education professor
- Parent(s): Lien Chan (father); Lien Fang Yu (mother)
- Relatives: Lien Chen-tung (grandfather); Lien Heng (great grandfather)
- Scientific career
- Fields: Design education
- Institutions: National Taiwan University
- Thesis: A comparative study of 3-D computer software Alias Sketch 1.5 and free-hand observational drawing on adolescent subjects' representation of three-dimensional objects (1996)
- Doctoral advisor: Judith M. Burton

Lien Hui-hsin (Chinese: 連惠心; born August 1, 1967), also known by her English name Arlene, is a Taiwanese education professor best known for her translation of Lien Heng's General History of Taiwan, her production of the Discoverer series, and the documentary History of Taiwan.

== Early life and education ==
Lien was born in 1967 to a prominent Taiwanese family. She is the oldest child of former vice-president Lien Chan and his wife, Lien Fang Yu, and the great-granddaughter of Taiwanese historian Lien Heng.

After attending Taipei American School, Lien graduated from Wellesley College with a bachelor's degree in history and literature in 1989. After graduation, she attended Harvard University and obtained a Master of Education (M.Ed.) from the Harvard Graduate School of Education in 1991. She then completed doctoral studies at Columbia University and earned her Doctor of Education (D.Ed.) from Teachers College, Columbia, in 1996. Her doctoral dissertation was titled, "A comparative study of 3-D computer software Alias Sketch 1.5 and free-hand observational drawing on adolescent subjects' representation of three-dimensional objects".

== Career ==
Upon returning to Taiwan in 1996, she worked as an associate professor at the Department of Graphic Arts and Communications, National Taiwan University until 2005. In 1996, she produced the first Taiwanese-made historical and cultural education documentary, titled Discoverer. The documentary received recognition for its cultural and educational value and was recommended by Taiwan's Ministry of Education. In 1999, she went on to create a documentary series called History of Taiwan, covering significant historical periods from Dutch Formosa to the Republic of China era. In 2012, she assumed the position of CEO at the Lien Chen-Tung Cultural and Educational Foundation, where she led a team of experts in publishing a vernacular version of The General History of Taiwan.

Following her PhD studies at Columbia University in 1994, Lien began producing educational materials, which led to the television documentary series Discoverer, originally presented by Richie Jen.

Lien also sought to make the content of her great-grandfather's work, The General History of Taiwan, more accessible. In 1999, she produced and filmed the series History of Taiwan, which included interviews with the National Archives of the Netherlands. The documentary was later aired on the Public Television Channel and China Television Channel, contributing to the preservation of Taiwanese historical data. The General History consists of 36 volumes covering the period from the Sui dynasty to the Japanese Occupation, and the TV series focused on the book's essential content. “History of Taiwan” was in four episodes, entitled “Dutch Period”, “Immigration Period”, “Japanese Occupation” and “Republic of China”. The filming of the four episodes was completed in 2000. The series “Kangxi Dynasty” (original name: Kangxi Empire), produced in Mainland China, also included a scene from History of Taiwan during its filming in 2001.

Lien's project to create a simplified version of the General History of Taiwan aimed to engage a broader audience. Collaborating with experts on Chinese literature and history, the book series “The General History of Taiwan: Original Text + Vernacular Annotation” was published in January 2024. The vernacular edition provides a valuable reference for researchers of Taiwanese history and offers an alternative perspective on historical narratives. The book launch event, held on February 7, 2024, was attended by prominent figures and scholars, emphasizing the importance of Taiwanese individuals being knowledgeable about their history. Former Premier Liu Chao-Shiuan praised the transition to vernacular language, noting its accessibility and engaging narrative style. He remarked on the fresh perspective offered by the vernacular edition, presenting historical narratives in a concise and captivating manner.

== Business interests ==
Lien founded a production company, Hua Yang Broadcasting, and rumours of her failure to manage the company's finances effectively arose as a result of a dispute between her and the company's president, Lee Chun-jung.

Lien was questioned by prosecutors in 2013 because of her position as a major shareholder of the distributor of a weight loss product called Welslim Plus, a product she stated she had herself used. The product contained an unapproved ingredient called cetilistat. Lien had initially denied that she had a financial interest in the company. Her prosecution was deferred, after she pleaded guilty and agreed to donate NT$6 million to the National Treasury.

== Personal life ==
Lien married Cheng Hongyuan in 1997. The couple have three daughters, all born in the United States to surrogate mothers, surrogacy being illegal in Taiwan; they were later brought to Taiwan to live. Cheng is the grandson of Chen Zha-mo, a well-known businessman.
