= 9th National Congress of the Kuomintang =

The 9th National Congress of the Kuomintang (Chinese: 中國國民黨第九次全國代表大会) was the ninth national congress of the Kuomintang (KMT), held on 12 to 22 November 1963 in Taipei, Taiwan Province, Nationalist China.

== See also ==
- Kuomintang
