= Tsou Tang =

Chinese-American political scientist (1918–1999)

Tsou Tang (Chinese: 鄒讜; 18 December 1918 – 7 August 1999) was a Chinese-born American political scientist best known for his book America's Failure in China (1963) and studies of contemporary Chinese politics. He was a professor at the University of Chicago from 1959 until his retirement in 1988, and held the university's Homer J. Livingston Professorship in Political Science.

== Career ==
Tsou Tang was born in Guangdong on 18 December 1918. His father was the academic Zou Lu. Tsou worked for the Central Bank of China a year after graduation from Southwest Associated University. In 1941, Tsou began graduate study at the University of Chicago, earning his doctorate in 1951. Tsou joined the University of Chicago faculty in 1959. He was named the Homer J. Livingston Professor in Political Science, and retired in 1988. He later lectured at the Illinois Institute of Technology and the University of Utah. Tsou also taught at Peking University as an honorary professor, starting in 1986. He was one of the first foreign academics to be granted membership into the Chinese Academy of Social Sciences, bestowed in 1997.

== Scholarly contribution ==
In the 1950s, Tsou was approached by political scientist Hans Morgenthau, chair of the University of Chicago’s Center for the Study of American Foreign and Military Policy, to explore the Sino-American relationship using both English- and Chinese-language materials. Tsou’s 1963 book, America’s Failure in China, 1941-50, drew upon his research at the Center. Its success would establish his reputation as a China scholar, and Tsou would go on to become a leader in the field of 'China Studies.'

The first of Tsou's six books, America's Failure in China, won attention from news media and his contemporaries. In it, Tsou described the question of, "who lost China?" as mistaken: "No one can lose something which he has never possessed." Tsou asserted that the main reason for the ubiquitous American "failure in China" was the combination of high expectations and low commitment. Throughout the war, Tsou explained, the American government only provided diplomatic support to the Nationalists, rather than military support. Tsou also accused Chiang Kai-shek of being both unable and unwilling to "undertake long overdue reforms", the absence of which drove many Chinese to support the Communists. During the war in China, Tsou found, most Americans completely misunderstood Chinese communism, and none of them had suggested giving direct military support to the Nationalists. Morgenthau stated that it was "both history in the grand style and political science at its best." Henry R. Lieberman wrote for The New York Times Book Review, "This is a balanced, scholarly and sobering work that helps set the record clear on United States relations with China from the time of Pearl Harbor to General MacArthur's ill-fated advance to the Yalu in Korea." Dali Yang summarized Tsou's beliefs thus: "His position in America’s Failure in China: 1941-1950 was that the Nationalist government lost to the communists in the Chinese Civil War because the Nationalist government was corrupt and riven by infighting." The historian Mary C. Wright praised it as "thoroughly documented, well written, and dispassionate", but said that the analysis "combines acute specific insights with apodictic general conclusions that do not necessaarily follow from the evidence so admirably presented." She questioned whether the evidence in Tsou's book showed that either the minority parties or regional military leaders was capable of governing China, and she added that massive American intervention Tsou envisioned would have created a "tidal wave of anti-Americanism."

His final writings, a collection of essays, were posthumously published in the journal Modern China in 2000.

Throughout his career, Tsou emphasized the importance of objectivity, both in sinology and in general. He also held that intellectual and academic exchange between China and the West was the only way for both parties to come to a greater understanding of one another. However, some scholars such as University of Wisconsin's Professor Qing Liu questioned the motives of this reputation, arguing that it was not merely professional courtesy, but a self-defensive reaction to the developing racial and political dilemmas of early Cold War America.

Tsou died of heart failure at the age of 80 on 7 August 1999, at the University of Chicago Medical Center.

== Selected publications ==
- Tang Tsou, "A Study of the Development of the Scientific Approach in Political Studies in the United States : With Particular Emphasis on the Methodological Aspects of the Works of Charles E. Merriam and Harold D. Lasswell," (Ph.D. Thesis, Political Science University of Chicago 1951).
