= Lien Heng =

Taiwanese historian, poet, and linguist

- 連橫
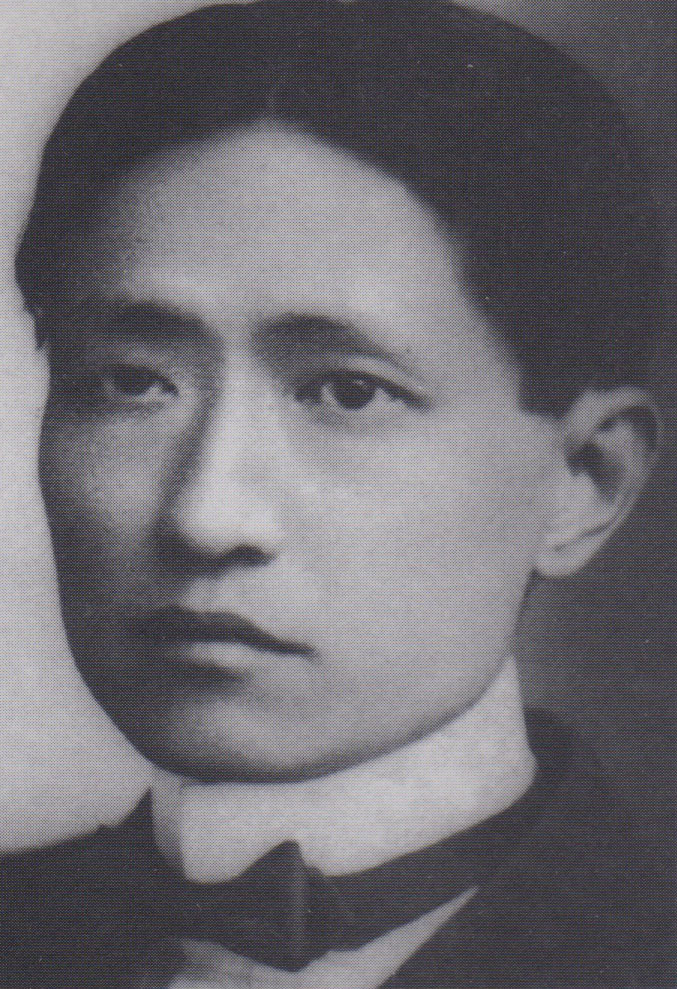
- Lien, c. 1914
- Born: February 17, 1878; Taiwan County, Taiwan Prefecture, Qing China
- Died: June 28, 1936 (aged 58); Shanghai, Republic of China
- Occupations: Historian; poet
- Notable work: The General History of Taiwan (1918)
- Children: 4, including Chen-tung
- Relatives: Lin Wenyue (granddaughter); Lien Chan (grandson); Sean Lien (great-grandson); Arlene Lien (great-granddaughter)

Chinese name
- Traditional Chinese: 連橫
Transcriptions
Standard Mandarin
- Hanyu Pinyin: Lián Héng
- Wade–Giles: Lien2 Hêng2
Southern Min
- Hokkien POJ: Liân Hêng

Lien Heng (Chinese: 連橫; Pe̍h-ōe-jī: Liân Hêng; February 17, 1878 – June 28, 1936) (Note: Also known as Lien Wu-gong (連武公; (Pe̍h-ōe-jī: Liân Bú-kong)), Lien Ya-tang (連雅堂; (Pe̍h-ōe-jī: Liân Ngá-tông)), and Lien Jian-hua (連劍花; (Pe̍h-ōe-jī: Liân Kiàm-hoa)).) was a Taiwanese historian, linguist, and poet. His most representative work was The General History of Taiwan. He contributed to the creation and spread of a unified and strong Taiwanese cultural identity through his historical research and works of poetry.

== Early life ==
Lien Heng was born on 17 February 1878 in Taiwan Prefecture, Qing-era Taiwan (modern-day Tainan, Taiwan). Lien grew up in a prosperous merchant family, the third son of Lien Te-Cheng. Lien's ancestors originated from the city of Longxi County (now part of Longhai City), Fujian Province. The family had moved to Taiwan at the end of the Ming dynasty as they were adamantly opposed to Manchu intrusions into China and the later foreign Qing dynasty. Born to a well-off family, Lien received an education in the traditional Chinese fashion, learning Chinese characters, poetry, and the Confucian Classics. Lien gained an early interest in Chinese and Taiwanese culture and history from stories told him by his father and private tutors. When Lien was 13 years old, his father gave him a book about the introduction of Taiwan, inspiring Lien's mind for recording Taiwan's history. With this exceptional schooling, Lien quickly developed into a young scholar-poet.

== Life under Japanese Rule ==
Lien Heng was 17 when Taiwan came under Japanese imperial rule as a result of the Qing defeat in the 1894 Sino-Japanese War. The island falling to Japanese control in the following Treaty of Shimonoseki and the death of his father in the same year had a great effect on Lien. Lien felt as little connection to the foreign Qing China as he did to the new Japanese Empire, and he soon began research on the ancient history of China. In 1895, Lien helped Liu Yongfu, the commander of Black Flag Army, defeat the control of Japanese army. Lien moved out from his house where the Lien family had lived for seven generations for Black Flag Army to station. After Japanese army fully controlled Taiwan, Lien's house was expropriated by the Japanese government and used as a district court, forcing Lien being homeless at that time.

Two years later in 1897, Lien's studies led him to Shanghai, a hub of progressive thought and western ideas. Due to illnesses and death in the family, he returned to Taiwan, where he began to create a genealogical record of the Lien family.

== Life and work ==
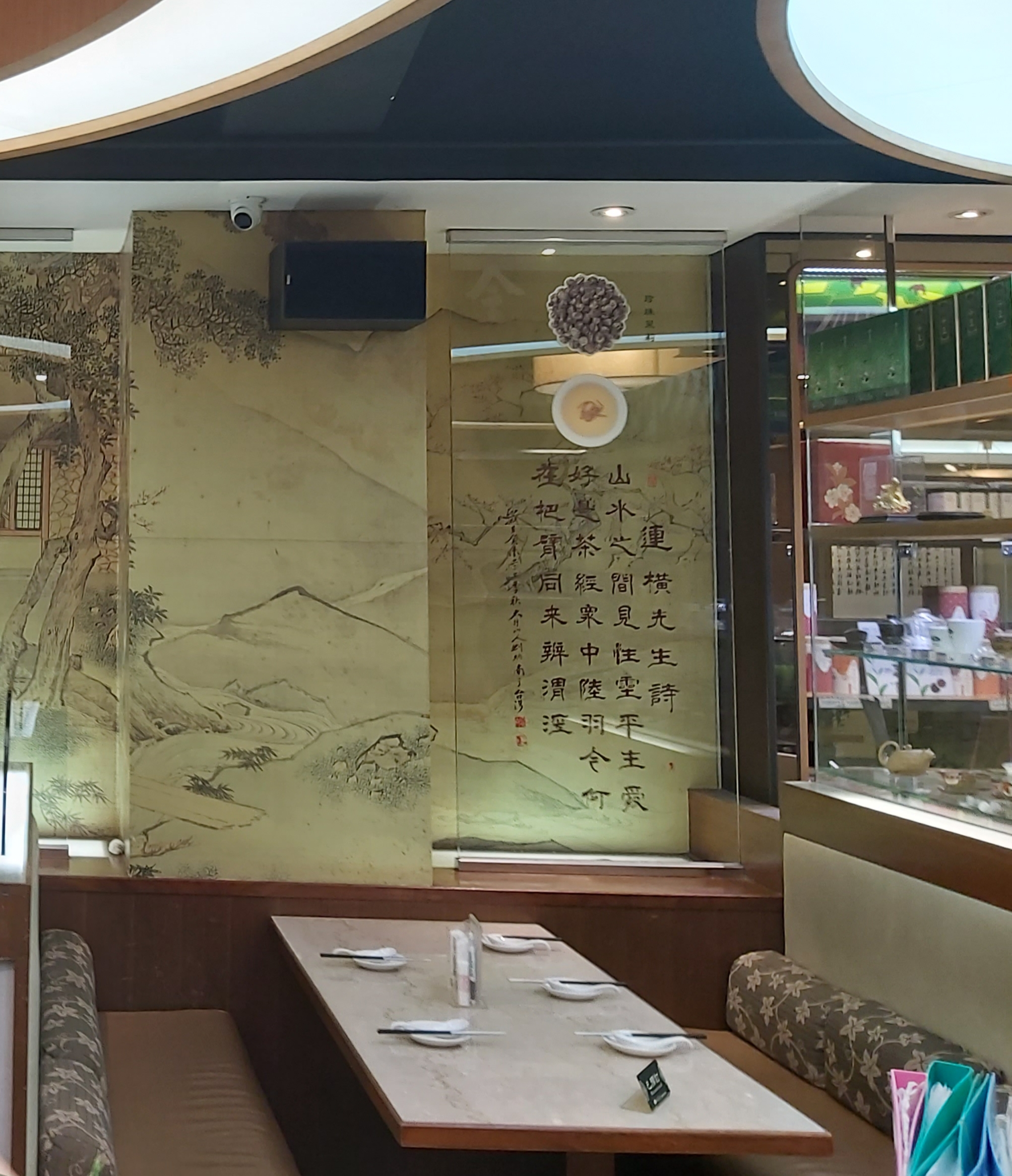
Lien Heng's poetry about tea.

On returning to Taiwan in 1898, Lien Heng married Lady Shen Ao. In 1899 Lien was recruited as editor-in-chief by the Tainan News Daily. Working as a journalist, Lien was exposed to the ideas of nationalism, and wrote articles and poems on his disillusionment with the Qing's backward policies and inaction.

In 1905 Lien and his family moved to Xiamen where he formed his own newspaper, the Fuchien Daily. Lien and other intellectuals such as Lo Hsiu-hui and Hu Tien-p'eng wrote articles supporting the Tongmenghui and other Anti-Manchu revolutionary causes. As a result of his revolutionary activities, the government deemed his newspaper a radical threat to the Qing. Feeling disheartened with the political situation in China, Lien and his family returned once again to Taiwan.

Back in Taiwan, Lien devoted himself to the cause of writing the history of Taiwan. Through his studies of mainland Chinese history and culture, Lien realized that the Taiwanese must also awaken in themselves a love for their own distinct heritage, language, and nationalism in order to withstand foreign oppression. Lien searched the island for archaeological and written remains of the earliest settlers of the island in order to gather information. On moving to Taichung in 1908, Lien was offered a job as editor for the Taiwan Daily. With the help of fellow intellectuals, scholars, and writers such as Liang Qichao, Hung Hsu, and Lin Hsien-tang Lien gathered necessary primary sources.

== General History of Taiwan ==
In 1921, Lien Heng published the Taiwan T'ung-shih (General History of Taiwan) covering Taiwanese history from the Sui dynasty up until the Japanese occupation. The work was a culmination of Lien's extensive research and the most comprehensive collection of Taiwanese history up until that time.

The work begins with the poignant line, "A country may be destroyed, but never its history".

Lien divided the General History of Taiwan into three sections: 1. The Annals 2. The Records and 3. The Biographies. The scope of Lien's work was immense, covering subjects spanning from historic migrations of Han Chinese from the mainland to Taiwan, famous women of the island, the reign of Koxinga, pirates, and the common people. At the beginning and end of each section, Lien gives his own analysis and interpretation on the topic, modeling the style used by Sima Qian on his Records of the Grand Historian. Lien used the General History of Taiwan as a way to interpret historical events and their importance in the formation of a national Taiwanese identity.

== Death and legacy ==
After completion of the General History of Taiwan, Lien Heng continued to encourage Taiwanese nationalism through political activism, poetry, and journalism. Lien died in 1936 at 58 years of age.

Lien's poems and historical works inspire in the Taiwanese a national sense of culture and spirit. His General History of Taiwan is to this day a remarkable view into the island's rich and diverse history. His poems and works were also later compiled into a collection in 1992 called the Lien Ya-t'ang hsien-sheng ch'uan-chi.

== See also ==
- Taiwan under Japanese rule
- History of Taiwan
- Taiwan Independence
- Lien Chan

== Bibliography ==
- Wu, Shui-Hui (2005). Lien Heng 1878–1936: Taiwan's Search for Identity and Tradition. Indiana University. ISBN 978-0-933070-53-0.
- Harrison, Mark (2006). "Lien Heng (1878-1936): Taiwan's Search for Identity and Tradition (Review)". The China Quarterly. Cambridge University Press. JSTOR 20192683.
- Goddard, William G. (1963). The Makers of Taiwan. China Publishing Company. OCLC 1941644.
- Lai, Tse-Han (1991). A Tragic Beginning: The Taiwan Uprising of February 28, 1947. Stanford University Press. ISBN 978-0-804718-29-5.
